= 220th New Jersey Legislature =

2022 to 2023 legislative session

←	219th Legislature	221st Legislature	→
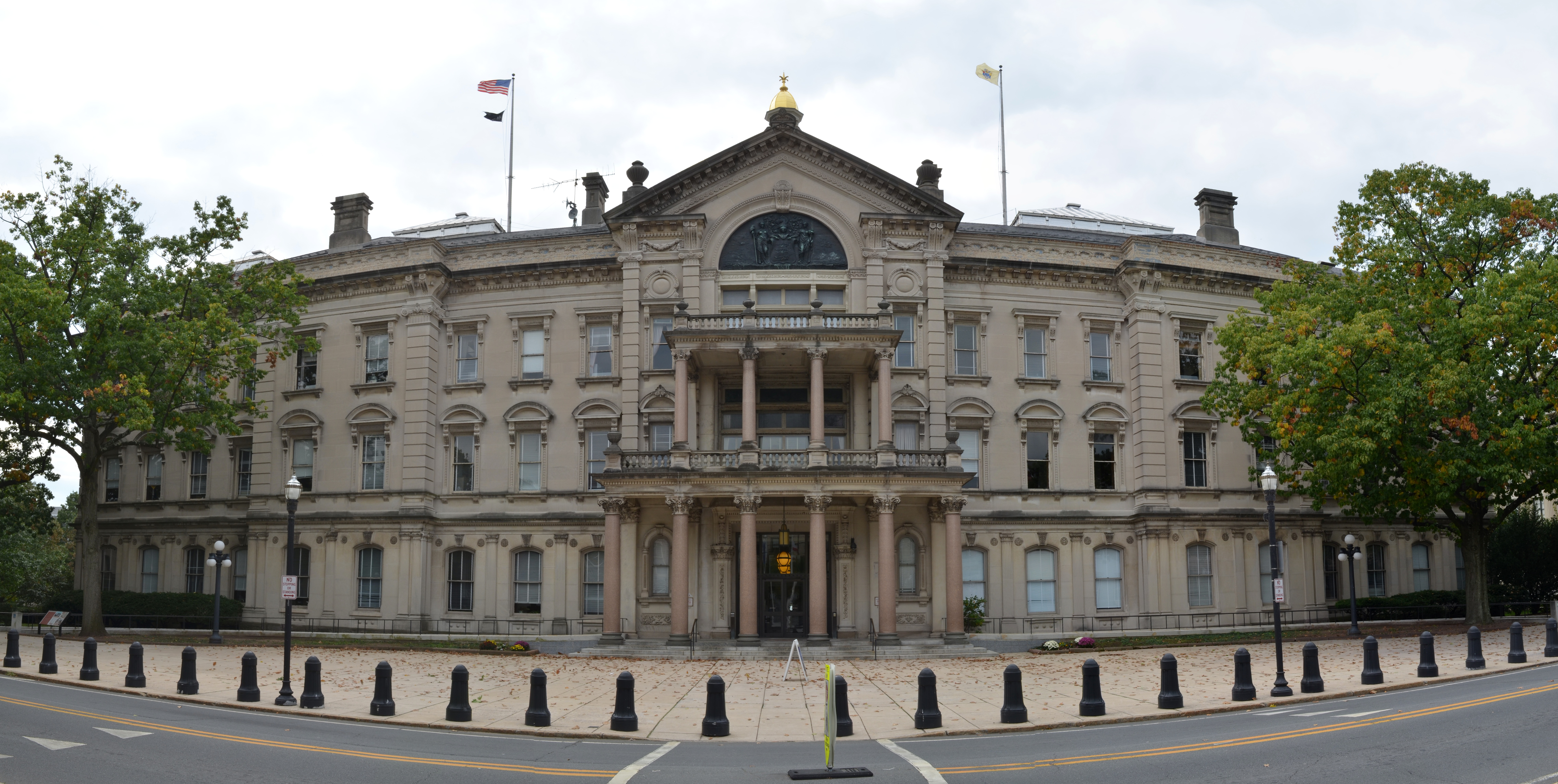
- The New Jersey State House in 2012

Overview
- Legislative body: New Jersey Legislature
- Jurisdiction: New Jersey, United States
- Term: January 11, 2022 – January 9, 2024

New Jersey General Assembly
- Members: 80
- Speaker: Craig Coughlin
- Minority Leader: John DiMaio
- Party control: Democratic Party

New Jersey Senate
- Members: 40
- President: Nicholas Scutari
- Minority Leader: Steve Oroho (January 11, 2022–June 30, 2023); Anthony M. Bucco (July 1, 2023–January 9, 2024)
- Party control: Democratic Party

The 220th New Jersey Legislature began on January 11, 2022, following the 2021 elections for Assembly and Senate. It ended on January 9, 2024.

== Assembly ==
=== Assembly composition ===
January 11, 2022 – July 23, 2022	Affiliation	Members
January 11, 2022 – July 23, 2022	Democratic Party	46
January 11, 2022 – July 23, 2022	Republican Party	34
January 11, 2022 – July 23, 2022	Total	80
July 23, 2022 – September 15, 2022	Affiliation	Members
July 23, 2022 – September 15, 2022	Democratic Party	46
July 23, 2022 – September 15, 2022	Republican Party	33
July 23, 2022 – September 15, 2022	Vacancies	1
July 23, 2022 – September 15, 2022	Total	79
September 15, 2022 – March 22, 2023	Affiliation	Members
September 15, 2022 – March 22, 2023	Democratic Party	46
September 15, 2022 – March 22, 2023	Republican Party	34
September 15, 2022 – March 22, 2023	Total	80
March 22, 2023 – May 25, 2023	Affiliation	Members
March 22, 2023 – May 25, 2023	Democratic Party	45
March 22, 2023 – May 25, 2023	Republican Party	34
March 22, 2023 – May 25, 2023	Vacancies	1
March 22, 2023 – May 25, 2023	Total	79
May 25, 2023 – December 31, 2024	Affiliation	Members
May 25, 2023 – December 31, 2024	Democratic Party	46
May 25, 2023 – December 31, 2024	Republican Party	34
May 25, 2023 – December 31, 2024	Total	80
January 1, 2024 – January 8, 2024	Affiliation	Members
January 1, 2024 – January 8, 2024	Democratic Party	45
January 1, 2024 – January 8, 2024	Republican Party	34
January 1, 2024 – January 8, 2024	Vacancies	1
January 1, 2024 – January 8, 2024	Total	79
January 8, 2024 – January 9, 2024	Affiliation	Members
January 8, 2024 – January 9, 2024	Democratic Party	46
January 8, 2024 – January 9, 2024	Republican Party	34
January 8, 2024 – January 9, 2024	Total	80

=== Assembly leadership ===
	Position	Name
Democratic Leadership
Democratic Leadership	Assembly Speaker	Craig Coughlin
Democratic Leadership	Majority Leader	Louis Greenwald
Democratic Leadership	Deputy Majority Leaders	Joseph V. Egan, Roy Freiman, Thomas Giblin, Angela McKnight, Bill Moen, Gabriela Mosquera & Chris Tully
Democratic Leadership	Assembly Speaker Pro-Tempore	Benjie Wimberly
Democratic Leadership	Majority Whip	Carol A. Murphy
Democratic Leadership	Conference Leader	Annette Quijano
Republican Leadership	Minority Leader	John DiMaio
Republican Leadership	Deputy Minority Leader	Nancy Munoz
Republican Leadership	Minority Whip	Antwan McClellan
Republican Leadership	Conference Leader	Ned Thomson

=== Assembly members ===
The Assembly consists of 80 members, two for each district.

District	Name	Party	Residence	First served
1	Antwan McClellan	Rep	Ocean City	2020
1	Erik K. Simonsen	Rep	Lower Township	2020
2	Don Guardian	Rep	Atlantic City	2022
2	Claire Swift	Rep	Margate City	2022
3	Bethanne McCarthy Patrick	Rep	Mannington Township	2022
3	Beth Sawyer	Rep	Woolwich Township	2022
4	Paul Moriarty	Dem	Washington Township (Gloucester)	2006
4	Gabriela Mosquera	Dem	Gloucester Township	2012 †
5	Bill Moen	Dem	Bellmawr	2020
5	William Spearman	Dem	Camden	2018 †
6	Louis Greenwald	Dem	Voorhees Township	1996
6	Pamela Rosen Lampitt	Dem	Cherry Hill	2006
7	Herb Conaway	Dem	Delran Township	1998
7	Carol A. Murphy	Dem	Mount Laurel	2018
8	Michael Torrissi	Rep	Hammonton	2022
8	Brandon Umba	Rep	Medford	2022
9	DiAnne Gove	Rep	Barnegat Township	2009 †
9	Brian E. Rumpf	Rep	Little Egg Harbor Township	2003 †
10	John Catalano	Rep	Brick Township	2020
10	Gregory P. McGuckin	Rep	Toms River	2012
11	Kimberly Eulner	Rep	Shrewsbury	2022
11	Marilyn Piperno	Rep	Colts Neck Township	2022
12	Robert D. Clifton	Rep	Matawan	2012
12	Alex Sauickie	Rep	Jackson Township	2022 †
13	Vicky Flynn	Rep	Holmdel Township	2022
13	Gerard Scharfenberger	Rep	Middletown Township	2020
14	Wayne DeAngelo	Dem	Hamilton Township (Mercer)	2008
14	Tennille McCoy	Dem	Hamilton Township (Mercer)	2024 †
15	Verlina Reynolds-Jackson	Dem	Trenton	2018 †
15	Anthony Verrelli	Dem	Hopewell Township (Mercer)	2018 †
16	Roy Freiman	Dem	Hillsborough Township	2018
16	Sadaf Jaffer	Dem	Montgomery Township	2022
17	Joseph Danielsen	Dem	Franklin Township (Somerset)	2014 †
17	Joseph V. Egan	Dem	New Brunswick	2002
18	Robert Karabinchak	Dem	Edison	2016 †
18	Sterley Stanley	Dem	East Brunswick	2021 †
19	Craig Coughlin	Dem	Woodbridge Township	2010
19	Yvonne Lopez	Dem	Perth Amboy	2018
20	Reginald Atkins	Dem	Roselle	2022
20	Annette Quijano	Dem	Elizabeth	2008 †
21	Michele Matsikoudis	Rep	New Providence	2022
21	Nancy Munoz	Rep	Summit	2009 †
22	Linda Carter	Dem	Plainfield	2018 †
22	James J. Kennedy	Dem	Rahway	2016
23	John DiMaio	Rep	Hackettstown	2009 †
23	Erik Peterson	Rep	Franklin Township (Hunterdon)	2009 †
24	Parker Space	Rep	Wantage Township	2013 †
24	Hal Wirths	Rep	Hardyston Township	2018
25	Brian Bergen	Rep	Denville Township	2020
25	Aura K. Dunn	Rep	Mendham Borough	2019 ‡
26	Christian Barranco	Rep	Jefferson Township	2022
26	Jay Webber	Rep	Morris Plains	2008
27	Mila Jasey	Dem	South Orange	2007 †
27	John F. McKeon	Dem	West Orange	2002
28	Jackie Yustein	Dem	Glen Ridge	2023 †
28	Cleopatra Tucker	Dem	Newark	2008
29	Eliana Pintor Marin	Dem	Newark	2013 †
29	Shanique Speight	Dem	Newark	2018
30	Sean T. Kean	Rep	Wall Township	2012 ±
30	Ned Thomson	Rep	Wall Township	2017 †
31	Angela V. McKnight	Dem	Jersey City	2016
31	William Sampson	Dem	Bayonne	2022
32	Angelica M. Jimenez	Dem	West New York	2012
32	Pedro Mejia	Dem	Secaucus	2018 †
33	Annette Chaparro	Dem	Hoboken	2016
33	Raj Mukherji	Dem	Jersey City	2014
34	Thomas P. Giblin	Dem	Montclair	2006
34	Britnee Timberlake	Dem	East Orange	2018 †
35	Shavonda E. Sumter	Dem	Paterson	2012
35	Benjie Wimberly	Dem	Paterson	2012
36	Clinton Calabrese	Dem	Cliffside Park	2018 †
36	Gary Schaer	Dem	Passaic	2006
37	Shama Haider	Dem	Tenafly	2022
37	Ellen Park	Dem	Englewood Cliffs	2022
38	Lisa Swain	Dem	Fair Lawn	2018 †
38	Chris Tully	Dem	Bergenfield	2018 †
39	Robert Auth	Rep	Old Tappan	2014
39	DeAnne DeFuccio	Rep	Upper Saddle River	2021 †
40	Christopher DePhillips	Rep	Wyckoff	2018
40	Kevin J. Rooney	Rep	Wyckoff	2016 †

==== Former members from this term ====
District	Name	Party	Residence	First served	Left office	Cause	Replaced by
12	Ronald Dancer	Rep	Plumsted Township	2002 †	July 23, 2022	Death (long illness)	Alex Sauickie
28	Ralph R. Caputo	Dem*	Nutley	2008*	March 21, 2023	Appointed to the board of directors of Horizon Blue Cross Blue Shield of New Jersey	Jackie Yustein
14	Daniel R. Benson	Dem	Hamilton Township (Mercer)	2011 †	December 31, 2023	Resignation prior to taking office as Mercer County Executive	Tennille McCoy

==== Notes ====
† First appointed to the seat
‡ Dunn was appointed to the seat in November 2019. The appointment expired at the conclusion of the 2018–19 term in January 2020. She was reappointed again in February 2020 after the start of the next term, and then won the seat in a special election in November 2020.
± Kean previously served in the Assembly from 2002 to 2008
* Caputo had served as a Republican during a previous stint in the Assembly from 1968 to 1972

== Senate ==
=== Senate composition ===
January 11, 2022 – August 31, 2022	Affiliation	Members
January 11, 2022 – August 31, 2022	Democratic Party	24
January 11, 2022 – August 31, 2022	Republican Party	16
January 11, 2022 – August 31, 2022	Total	40
September 1, 2022 – September 29, 2022	Affiliation	Members
September 1, 2022 – September 29, 2022	Democratic Party	23
September 1, 2022 – September 29, 2022	Republican Party	16
September 1, 2022 – September 29, 2022	Vacancies	1
September 1, 2022 – September 29, 2022	Total	39
September 29, 2022 – November 30, 2022	Affiliation	Members
September 29, 2022 – November 30, 2022	Democratic Party	24
September 29, 2022 – November 30, 2022	Republican Party	16
September 29, 2022 – November 30, 2022	Total	40
November 30, 2022 – December 19, 2022	Affiliation	Members
November 30, 2022 – December 19, 2022	Democratic Party	24
November 30, 2022 – December 19, 2022	Republican Party	15
November 30, 2022 – December 19, 2022	Vacancies	1
November 30, 2022 – December 19, 2022	Total	39
December 19, 2022 – February 13, 2023	Affiliation	Members
December 19, 2022 – February 13, 2023	Democratic Party	24
December 19, 2022 – February 13, 2023	Republican Party	16
December 19, 2022 – February 13, 2023	Total	40
February 13, 2023–present	Affiliation	Members
February 13, 2023–present	Democratic Party	25
February 13, 2023–present	Republican Party	15
February 13, 2023–present	Total	40

=== Senate leadership ===
	Position	Name
Democratic Leadership	Senate President	Nicholas Scutari
Democratic Leadership	Majority Leader	Teresa Ruiz
Democratic Leadership	Deputy Majority Leader	Paul Sarlo
Democratic Leadership	Senate President Pro-Tempore	Sandra Bolden Cunningham
Democratic Leadership	Majority Whip	Troy Singleton
Democratic Leadership	Conference Leader	Vin Gopal
Democratic Leadership	Senate Majority Caucus Chair	Nellie Pou
Democratic Leadership	Senate Deputy President Pro-Tempore	Richard Codey
Republican Leadership	Minority Leader	Steve Oroho (January 11, 2023 – June 30, 2023); Anthony M. Bucco (July 1, 2023–present)
Republican Leadership	Deputy Minority Leaders	Joseph Pennacchio and Robert Singer
Republican Leadership	Minority Whip	Anthony M. Bucco (until July 1, 2023)
Republican Leadership	Conference Leader	Kristin Corrado
Republican Leadership	Deputy Conference Leader	Holly Schepisi

=== Senate members ===
The Senate consists of 40 members, one for each district.

District	Name	Party	Residence	First served
1	Mike Testa	Rep	Vineland	2019 ‡
2	Vincent J. Polistina	Rep	Egg Harbor Township	2021 †
3	Edward Durr	Rep	Logan Township	2022
4	Fred H. Madden	Dem	Washington Township (Gloucester)	2004
5	Nilsa Cruz-Perez	Dem	Barrington	2014 †
6	James Beach	Dem	Voorhees Township	2009 †
7	Troy Singleton	Dem	Delran Township	2018
8	Jean Stanfield	Rep	Westampton	2022
9	Christopher J. Connors	Rep	Lacey Township	2008
10	James W. Holzapfel	Rep	Toms River	2012
11	Vin Gopal	Dem	Long Branch	2018
12	Samuel D. Thompson	Dem*	Old Bridge Township	2012
13	Declan O'Scanlon	Rep	Little Silver	2018
14	Linda R. Greenstein	Dem	Plainsboro Township	2010 ‡
15	Shirley Turner	Dem	Lawrence Township (Mercer)	1998
16	Andrew Zwicker	Dem	South Brunswick	2022
17	Bob Smith	Dem	Piscataway	2002
18	Patrick J. Diegnan	Dem	South Plainfield	2016 †
19	Joe Vitale	Dem	Woodbridge Township	1998
20	Joseph Cryan	Dem	Union Township (Union)	2018
21	Jon Bramnick	Rep	Westfield	2022
22	Nicholas Scutari	Dem	Linden	2004
23	Doug Steinhardt	Rep	Lopatcong Township	2022 †
24	Steve Oroho	Rep	Franklin (Sussex)	2008
25	Anthony M. Bucco	Rep	Boonton Township	2019 †
26	Joseph Pennacchio	Rep	Montville	2008
27	Richard Codey	Dem	Roseland	1982
28	Renee Burgess	Dem	Irvington	2022 †
29	Teresa Ruiz	Dem	Newark	2008
30	Robert Singer	Rep	Lakewood Township	1993 †
31	Sandra Bolden Cunningham	Dem	Jersey City	2007 †
32	Nicholas Sacco	Dem	North Bergen	1994
33	Brian P. Stack	Dem	Union City	2008
34	Nia Gill	Dem	Montclair	2002
35	Nellie Pou	Dem	North Haledon	2012
36	Paul Sarlo	Dem	Wood-Ridge	2003 †
37	Gordon M. Johnson	Dem	Englewood	2022
38	Joseph Lagana	Dem	Paramus	2018 †
39	Holly Schepisi	Rep	River Vale	2021 †
40	Kristin Corrado	Rep	Totowa	2017 †

==== Former members from this term ====
District	Name	Party	Residence	First served	Left office	Cause	Replaced by
28	Ronald Rice	Dem	Newark	1986 ‡	August 31, 2022	Resigned due to health problems (later died in March 2023)	Renee Burgess
23	Michael J. Doherty	Rep	Washington Township (Warren)	2009 ‡	November 30, 2022	Elected Warren County Surrogate	Doug Steinhardt

==== Notes ====
† First appointed to the seat
‡ Elected in a special election
* Thompson served as a Republican prior to February 2023

== See also ==
- List of New Jersey state legislatures
