= 222nd New Jersey Legislature =

2026 to 2027 legislative session

←	221st Legislature	223rd Legislature	→
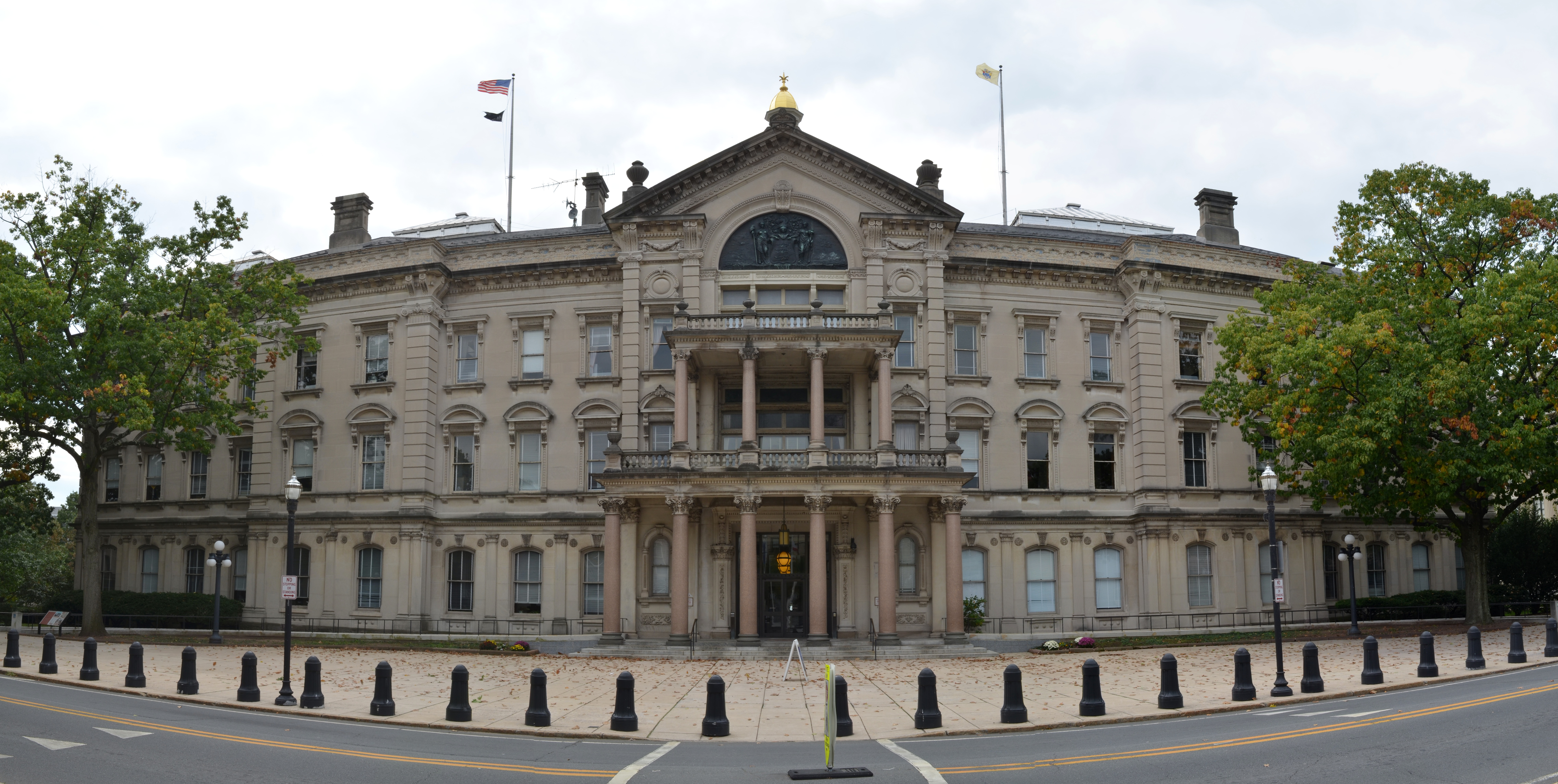
- The New Jersey State House in 2012

Overview
- Legislative body: New Jersey Legislature
- Jurisdiction: New Jersey, United States
- Term: January 13, 2026 – January 11, 2028

New Jersey General Assembly
- Members: 80
- Speaker: Craig Coughlin
- Majority Leader: Louis Greenwald
- Minority Leader: John DiMaio
- Party control: Democratic Party

New Jersey Senate
- Members: 40
- President: Nicholas Scutari
- Majority Leader: Teresa Ruiz
- Minority Leader: Anthony M. Bucco
- Party control: Democratic Party

The 222nd New Jersey Legislature began on January 13, 2026, following the 2025 election for the General Assembly. It will end on January 11, 2028.

The members of the Assembly will serve two-year terms through the end of the legislative session in January 2028 while members of the Senate elected in 2023 will continue serving their four-year terms that began in January 2024 that will also expire in January 2028.

== Assembly ==
=== Assembly composition ===
Starting January 13, 2026	Affiliation	Members
Starting January 13, 2026	Democratic Party	57
Starting January 13, 2026	Republican Party	23
Starting January 13, 2026	Total	80

Democrats flipped five seats in the 2025 election, with Maureen Rowan ousting Republican Claire Swift in the 2nd district, Anthony Angelozzi ousting Republican Michael Torrissi in the 8th district, Vincent Kearney and Andrew Macurdy ousting Republicans Michele Matsikoudis and Nancy Muñoz in the 21st district, and Marisa Sweeney ousting Republican Christian Barranco in the 25th district. The Democrats will now have a supermajority in the Assembly and their largest majority since Watergate.

=== Assembly members ===
The Assembly consists of 80 members, two for each district.

Legislative District	Assembly Member	Party	Assumed Office	Counties represented	Residence
District 1	Antwan McClellan	Republican	January 14, 2020	Atlantic, Cape May, Cumberland	Ocean City
District 1	Erik Simonsen	Republican	January 14, 2020	Atlantic, Cape May, Cumberland	Lower Township
District 2	Don Guardian	Republican	January 11, 2022	Atlantic	Atlantic City
District 2	Maureen Rowan	Democratic	January 13, 2026	Atlantic	Atlantic City
District 3	David Bailey	Democratic	January 9, 2024	Cumberland, Gloucester Salem	Woodstown
District 3	Heather Simmons	Democratic	January 9, 2024	Cumberland, Gloucester Salem	Glassboro
District 4	Dan Hutchison	Democratic	January 9, 2024	Atlantic, Camden, Gloucester	Gloucester Township
District 4	Cody Miller	Democratic	January 9, 2024	Atlantic, Camden, Gloucester	Monroe Township
District 5	Bill Moen	Democratic	January 14, 2020	Camden, Gloucester	Camden
District 5	William Spearman	Democratic	June 30, 2018	Camden, Gloucester	Camden
District 6	Louis Greenwald	Democratic	January 9, 1996	Burlington, Camden	Voorhees Township
District 6	Melinda Kane	Democratic	January 23, 2025	Burlington, Camden	Cherry Hill
District 7	Carol A. Murphy	Democratic	January 9, 2018	Burlington	Mount Laurel
District 7	Balvir Singh	Democratic	January 30, 2025	Burlington	Burlington Township
District 8	Anthony Angelozzi	Democratic	January 13, 2026	Atlantic, Burlington	Hammonton
District 8	Andrea Katz	Democratic	January 9, 2024	Atlantic, Burlington	Chesterfield Township
District 9	Greg Myhre	Republican	January 9, 2024	Ocean	Stafford
District 9	Brian E. Rumpf	Republican	June 23, 2003	Ocean	Little Egg Harbor
District 10	Paul Kanitra	Republican	January 9, 2024	Ocean, Monmouth	Point Pleasant Beach
District 10	Gregory P. McGuckin	Republican	January 10, 2012	Ocean, Monmouth	Toms River
District 11	Margie Donlon	Democratic	January 9, 2024	Monmouth	Ocean Township
District 11	Luanne Peterpaul	Democratic	January 9, 2024	Monmouth	Long Branch
District 12	Robert D. Clifton	Republican	January 10, 2012	Burlington, Middlesex, Ocean	Matawan
District 12	Alex Sauickie	Republican	July 23, 2022	Burlington, Middlesex, Ocean	Jackson Township
District 13	Vicky Flynn	Republican	January 11, 2022	Monmouth	Holmdel
District 13	Gerard Scharfenberger	Republican	January 14, 2020	Monmouth	Middletown
District 14	Wayne DeAngelo	Democratic	January 8, 2008	Mercer, Middlesex	Hamilton Township
District 14	Tennille McCoy	Democratic	January 8, 2024	Mercer, Middlesex	Hamilton Township
District 15	Verlina Reynolds-Jackson	Democratic	February 15, 2018	Hunterdon, Mercer	Trenton
District 15	Anthony Verrelli	Democratic	August 5, 2018	Hunterdon, Mercer	Hopewell Township
District 16	Mitchelle Drulis	Democratic	January 9, 2024	Hunterdon, Mercer, Middlesex, Somerset	East Amwell
District 16	Roy Freiman	Democratic	January 9, 2018	Hunterdon, Mercer, Middlesex, Somerset	Hillsborough Township
District 17	Joseph Danielsen	Democratic	October 16, 2014	Middlesex, Somerset	Franklin Township
District 17	Kevin Egan	Democratic	January 9, 2024	Middlesex, Somerset	New Brunswick
District 18	Robert Karabinchak	Democratic	May 26, 2016	Middlesex	Edison
District 18	Sterley Stanley	Democratic	January 27, 2021	Middlesex	East Brunswick
District 19	Craig Coughlin	Democratic	January 12, 2010	Middlesex	Woodbridge
District 19	Yvonne Lopez	Democratic	January 9, 2018	Middlesex	Perth Amboy
District 20	Annette Quijano	Democratic	September 25, 2008	Union	Elizabeth
District 20	Ed Rodriguez	Democratic	January 13, 2026	Union	Elizabeth
District 21	Vincent Kearney	Democratic	January 13, 2026	Middlesex, Morris, Somerset, Union	Garwood
District 21	Andrew Macurdy	Democratic	January 13, 2026	Middlesex, Morris, Somerset, Union	Summit
District 22	Linda S. Carter	Democratic	May 24, 2018	Somerset, Union	Plainfield
District 22	James J. Kennedy	Democratic	January 12, 2016	Somerset, Union	Rahway
District 23	John DiMaio	Republican	February 21, 2009	Hunterdon, Somerset, Warren	Hackettstown
District 23	Erik Peterson	Republican	December 7, 2009	Hunterdon, Somerset, Warren	Franklin Township
District 24	Dawn Fantasia	Republican	January 9, 2024	Morris, Sussex, Warren	Franklin Borough
District 24	Mike Inganamort	Republican	January 9, 2024	Morris, Sussex, Warren	Chester Township
District 25	Aura K. Dunn	Republican	November 21, 2019 ‡	Morris, Passaic	Mendham Borough
District 25	Marisa Sweeney	Democratic	January 13, 2026	Morris, Passaic	Morristown
District 26	Brian Bergen	Republican	January 14, 2020	Morris, Passaic	Denville
District 26	Jay Webber	Republican	January 8, 2008	Morris, Passaic	Morris Plains
District 27	Rosy Bagolie	Democratic	January 9, 2024	Essex, Passaic	Livingston
District 27	Alixon Collazos-Gill	Democratic	January 9, 2024	Essex, Passaic	Montclair
District 28	Chigozie Onyema	Democratic	January 13, 2026	Essex, Union	Newark
District 28	Cleopatra Tucker	Democratic	January 8, 2008	Essex, Union	Newark
District 29	Eliana Pintor Marin	Democratic	September 11, 2013	Essex, Hudson	Newark
District 29	Shanique Speight	Democratic	January 9, 2018	Essex, Hudson	Newark
District 30	Sean T. Kean	Republican	January 10, 2012 ±	Monmouth, Ocean	Wall
District 30	Avi Schnall	Democratic	January 9, 2024	Monmouth, Ocean	Lakewood Township
District 31	William Sampson	Democratic	January 11, 2022	Hudson	Bayonne
District 31	Jerry Walker	Democratic	January 13, 2026	Hudson	Jersey City
District 32	Ravinder Bhalla	Democratic	January 13, 2026	Hudson	Hoboken
District 32	Katie Brennan	Democratic	January 13, 2026	Hudson	Jersey City
District 33	Gabe Rodriguez	Democratic	January 9, 2024	Hudson	West New York
District 33	Larry Wainstein	Democratic	January 13, 2026	Hudson	North Bergen
District 34	Carmen Morales	Democratic	January 9, 2024	Essex	Belleville
District 34	Michael Venezia	Democratic	January 9, 2024	Essex	Bloomfield
District 35	Al Abdelaziz	Democratic	January 23, 2025	Bergen, Passaic	Paterson
District 35	Kenyatta Stewart	Democratic	January 13, 2026	Bergen, Passaic	Paterson
District 36	Clinton Calabrese	Democratic	February 10, 2018	Bergen, Passaic	Cliffside Park
District 36	Gary Schaer	Democratic	January 10, 2006	Bergen, Passaic	Passaic
District 37	Shama Haider	Democratic	January 11, 2022	Bergen	Tenafly
District 37	Ellen Park	Democratic	January 11, 2022	Bergen	Englewood Cliffs
District 38	Lisa Swain	Democratic	May 24, 2018	Bergen	Fair Lawn
District 38	Chris Tully	Democratic	May 24, 2018	Bergen	Bergenfield
District 39	Robert Auth	Republican	January 14, 2014	Bergen	Old Tappan
District 39	John V. Azzariti	Republican	January 9, 2024	Bergen	Saddle River
District 40	Al Barlas	Republican	January 9, 2024	Bergen, Passaic	Cedar Grove
District 40	Christopher DePhillips	Republican	January 9, 2018	Bergen, Passaic	Wyckoff

Notes:
‡ Dunn was appointed to the seat in November 2019. The appointment expired at the conclusion of the 2018–19 term in January 2020. She was reappointed again in February 2020 after the start of the next term and then won the seat in a special election in November 2020.
± Kean previously served in the Assembly from 2002 to 2008

== Senate ==
=== Senate composition ===
Starting January 9, 2024	Affiliation	Members
Starting January 9, 2024	Democratic Party	25
Starting January 9, 2024	Republican Party	15
Starting January 9, 2024	Total	40

New Jersey State Senators are elected for four year terms and they will serve the third and fourth years of their four-year term in this legislative session.

=== Senate members ===
The Senate consists of 40 members, one for each district.

District	Senator	Party	Assumed office	Counties represented	Residence
District 1	Mike Testa	Republican	December 5, 2019	Atlantic, Cape May, Cumberland	Vineland
District 2	Vincent J. Polistina	Republican	November 8, 2021	Atlantic	Egg Harbor Township
District 3	John Burzichelli	Democratic	January 9, 2024	Cumberland, Gloucester Salem	Paulsboro
District 4	Paul D. Moriarty	Democratic	January 9, 2024	Atlantic, Camden, Gloucester	Washington Township
District 5	Nilsa Cruz-Perez	Democratic	December 15, 2014	Camden, Gloucester	Barrington
District 6	James Beach	Democratic	January 3, 2009	Burlington, Camden	Voorhees Township
District 7	Troy Singleton	Democratic	January 9, 2018	Burlington	Palmyra
District 8	Latham Tiver	Republican	January 9, 2024	Atlantic, Burlington	Southampton
District 9	Carmen Amato	Republican	January 9, 2024	Ocean	Lacey
District 10	James W. Holzapfel	Republican	January 10, 2012	Ocean, Monmouth	Toms River
District 11	Vin Gopal	Democratic	January 9, 2018	Monmouth	Long Branch
District 12	Owen Henry	Republican	January 9, 2024	Burlington, Middlesex, Ocean	Old Bridge Township
District 13	Declan O'Scanlon	Republican	January 9, 2018	Monmouth	Little Silver
District 14	Linda R. Greenstein	Democratic	December 6, 2010	Mercer, Middlesex	Plainsboro Township
District 15	Shirley Turner	Democratic	January 13, 1998	Hunterdon, Mercer	Lawrence Township
District 16	Andrew Zwicker	Democratic	January 11, 2022	Hunterdon, Mercer, Middlesex, Somerset	South Brunswick
District 17	Bob Smith	Democratic	January 8, 2002	Middlesex, Somerset	Piscataway
District 18	Patrick J. Diegnan	Democratic	May 9, 2016	Middlesex	South Plainfield
District 19	Joe F. Vitale	Democratic	January 13, 1998	Middlesex	Woodbridge
District 20	Joseph Cryan	Democratic	January 9, 2018	Union	Union Township
District 21	Jon Bramnick	Republican	January 11, 2022	Middlesex, Morris, Somerset, Union	Westfield
District 22	Nicholas Scutari	Democratic	January 13, 2004	Somerset, Union	Linden
District 23	Doug Steinhardt	Republican	December 19, 2022	Hunterdon, Somerset, Warren	Lopatcong
District 24	Parker Space	Republican	January 9, 2024	Morris, Sussex, Warren	Wantage
District 25	Anthony M. Bucco	Republican	October 24, 2019	Morris, Passaic	Boonton Township
District 26	Joseph Pennacchio	Republican	January 8, 2008	Morris, Passaic	Rockaway Township
District 27	John F. McKeon	Democratic	January 9, 2024	Essex, Passaic	West Orange
District 28	Renee Burgess	Democratic	September 29, 2022	Essex, Union	Irvington
District 29	Teresa Ruiz	Democratic	January 8, 2008	Essex, Hudson	Newark
District 30	Robert W. Singer	Republican	October 14, 1993	Monmouth, Ocean	Lakewood Township
District 31	Angela V. McKnight	Democratic	January 9, 2024	Hudson	Jersey City
District 32	Raj Mukherji	Democratic	January 9, 2024	Hudson	Jersey City
District 33	Brian P. Stack	Democratic	January 8, 2008	Hudson	Union City
District 34	Britnee Timberlake	Democratic	January 9, 2024	Essex	East Orange
District 35	Benjie Wimberly	Democratic	January 30, 2025	Bergen, Passaic	Paterson
District 36	Paul Sarlo	Democratic	May 19, 2003	Bergen, Passaic	Wood-Ridge
District 37	Gordon M. Johnson	Democratic	January 11, 2022	Bergen	Englewood
District 38	Joseph Lagana	Democratic	April 12, 2018	Bergen	Paramus
District 39	Holly Schepisi	Republican	March 25, 2021	Bergen	River Vale
District 40	Kristin Corrado	Republican	October 5, 2017	Bergen, Passaic	Totowa

== See also ==
- List of New Jersey state legislatures
