= Eric Muñoz =

American politician

Member of the New Jersey General Assembly from the 21st district
- In office May 10, 2001 – March 30, 2009
- Preceded by: Kevin J. O'Toole
- Succeeded by: Nancy Muñoz

Personal details
- Born: October 14, 1947 The Bronx, New York, U.S.
- Died: March 30, 2009 (aged 61) Newark, New Jersey, U.S.
- Cause of death: Aortic aneurysm
- Party: Republican
- Spouse(s): ? (divorced); Nancy Ann Foster (1984-2009) (his death)
- Children: five
- Occupation: Surgeon

Eric Muñoz (October 14, 1947 – March 30, 2009) was an American surgeon and Republican politician, who served in the New Jersey General Assembly from May 2001, where he represented the 21st legislative district, until his death on March 30, 2009. Muñoz had served as the Deputy Conference Leader since 2006.

== Early life ==
Muñoz was born on October 14, 1947, in the Bronx, New York. His father, William Muñoz, was a manager of a Freehold Borough waste water treatment plant and a general store in Colts Neck Township. He grew up in Colts Neck, first attending Atlantic Elementary School there and the Peddie School in Hightstown.

== Medical career ==
Muñoz graduated with a B.A. degree from the University of Virginia in Pre-Med and received an M.D. degree from the Albert Einstein College of Medicine. He did his general surgery training at Yale-New Haven Hospital, and was also awarded his Master of Business Administration in Finance degree from Columbia University.

Muñoz was a practicing trauma surgeon and administrator at the University of Medicine and Dentistry of New Jersey. He served on the National Institutes of Health Committee since 2002. From 1990 to 2001, he served as Chairman of the New Jersey Medical Practitioner Review Panel, where he was first appointed by Governor of New Jersey James Florio in 1990 and reappointed by Governor Christine Todd Whitman in 1995.

== Political career ==
A longtime resident of Summit, New Jersey, Muñoz served on the Summit Common Council from 1996 until 2001. He was a former Republican Municipal Chairman in Summit. He was elected to an unexpired term as Assemblyman in the old 21st Legislative District in 2001 to succeed Kevin J. O'Toole who became a State Senator.

He was elected in 2001, and reelected in 2003, 2005 and 2007, to represent the new 21st District consisting of municipalities in Union, Morris, Essex and Somerset counties. He served as Deputy Leader of the Republican Conference for the 2006–2008 term.

Muñoz was the second legislator in the country to introduce the "Jessica Lunsford Act" - this bill requires a mandatory minimum sentence of 25 Years to life for "Aggravated Sexual Assault Against Children Under 13 Years of Age". The bill was signed into law in New Jersey, on May 15, 2014, with Assemblywoman Nancy Muñoz as the sponsor.

Muñoz served in the Assembly on the Health and Senior Services Committee and the Human Services Committee.

== Personal life ==
In 1984, he married Nancy Ann Foster at his parents' house in Freehold. Together, they had five children.

Muñoz died from complications from a ruptured aortic aneurysm following heart surgery on March 30, 2009, at the age of 61.

On April 27, 2009, a special convention was held by Republican county committee members to fill the vacancy caused by Muñoz's death. His widow defeated two opponents, Long Hill Mayor George Vitureira and Long Hill School Board member Bruce Meringolo. The final tally was Muñoz 174, Meringolo 34, Vitureira 16. Both Meringolo and Vitureira filed petitions to appear on the June 2009 Republican primary ballot. Nancy Muñoz filled the seat for the remainder of the term in January 2010 and was elected in her own right from then until 2025 when she lost re-election to Democrats Vincent Kearney and Andrew Macurdy.

New Jersey General Assembly
Preceded by Kevin J. O'Toole	Member of the New Jersey General Assembly for the 21st District; May 10, 2001 – March 30, 2009; With: Joel Weingarten, Thomas Kean, Jr., Jon Bramnick	Succeeded by Nancy Muñoz
