= Joel Weingarten =

American politician (born 1959)

Member of the New Jersey General Assembly from the 21st district
- In office May 2, 1996 – January 8, 2002
- Preceded by: Monroe Jay Lustbader
- Succeeded by: Thomas Kean Jr.

Personal details
- Born: October 6, 1959 (age 66) New York City, New York, U.S.
- Party: Republican

Joel M. Weingarten (born October 6, 1959) is an American Republican Party politician who served three terms in the New Jersey General Assembly, where he represented the 21st Legislative District from 1996 to 2002.

== Education and professional career ==
Weingarten earned his undergraduate degree from St. John's College, where he majored in liberal arts and was awarded an M.S. from the Tepper School of Business at Carnegie-Mellon University, where he majored in business. Weingarten was employed as a management consultant at Deloitte & Touche, and is currently a Managing Director at Quest Associates.

== Early political career ==
He served on the Millburn Township Committee from 1993 to 1996. In 1995, Weingarten served as Acting Director of the Essex County Office of Management and Budget, where he voted for a $516 million budget.

== NJ Assembly ==
Weingarten was elected to the Assembly in a November 1996 special election in which he defeated Democratic candidate Robert R. Peacock to fill the one year remaining on the vacant seat of Monroe Jay Lustbader, who had died in office in March 1996. He was re-elected to serve an additional two full terms of office in 1997 and 1999, together with Republican running mate Kevin J. O'Toole. Weingarten served in the Assembly on the Appropriations Committee and the Law and Public Safety Committee. Weingarten also served on the NJ State Leasing & Space Utilization Committee, which he chaired in 1998.

In the legislature, Weingarten sponsored bills to: require a 2/3 of the legislature before there could be any new tax increase, to eliminate the transfer inheritance tax, and to provide a 50% capital gains deduction under the gross income tax.

Weingarten sponsored a bill to impose state sanctions on Swiss Financial service institutions to prod the return of funds owed to the heirs of Holocaust victims. The legislation, which passed the NJ Assembly on May 18, 1998—the first such bill passed by any US legislature—called for prohibiting NJ from investing funds in Swiss Banks and to divest its existing holdings in Swiss Banks. This legislation, and subsequent sanctions proposed by other states helped compel Switzerland to reach an ultimate settlement of outstanding claims. The Swiss said that the settlement was contingent on public officials agreeing not to pursue proposed sanctions by political subdivisions.

Weingarten also sponsored the 1997 New Jersey welfare reform law that mandates welfare benefits would only be paid to recipients if they actively seek employment or attend educational training programs.

Together with Jack Collins, Weingarten sponsored a bill in the Assembly in January 2000 that would prohibit state and local laws that interfere with religion, except in cases where there was a compelling public interest. Weingarten stated that the bill could be used to prevent routine autopsies on Orthodox Jews unless there was a question of foul play and would allow churches and synagogues to be exempted from local zoning and historic preservation laws unless an unsafe condition was created for traffic, as another example. Catholic hospitals could not be required to perform abortions and religious headwear could not be banned from public schools, under the provisions of the bill. Weingarten's legislation was modelled on the 1993 federal Religious Freedom Restoration Act, which was struck down by the United States Supreme Court in 1997.

In 2000, Weingarten proposed legislation that passed unanimously in the Assembly to require the State of New Jersey to create a web site listing sex offenders, including their names, addresses, pictures and details of the crimes committed. The bill expanded the availability of information about sex offenders beyond the community notification requirements included in the 1994 Megan's Law. Weingarten emphasized the importance of making this information available, noting that as many of 95% of those who have committed sexual crimes are repeat offenders.

On law enforcement matters, he crafted civil commitment legislation that requires pre-parole and pre-sentencing reports to include defendant's psychological history, in order to preclude the mis-sentencing or inappropriate release of violent criminals. He also sponsored a law to limit the liability of police officers for injuries arising in the course of pursuing criminals.

On education matters, Weingarten sponsored a bill requiring NJ public schools to provide instruction in the US Constitution and the Declaration of Independence.

In redistricting following the 2000 United States census, Millburn became the only Essex County municipality to remain in the 21st District, costing him the opportunity to win the Republican nomination in the reformed district.

New Jersey General Assembly
Preceded by Monroe Jay Lustbader	Member of the New Jersey General Assembly from the 21st district 1996–2002; Served alongside: Kevin J. O'Toole, Eric Munoz	Succeeded by Thomas Kean Jr.
