= 221st New Jersey Legislature =

2024 to 2025 legislative session

| ← | 220th Legislature | 222nd Legislature | → |
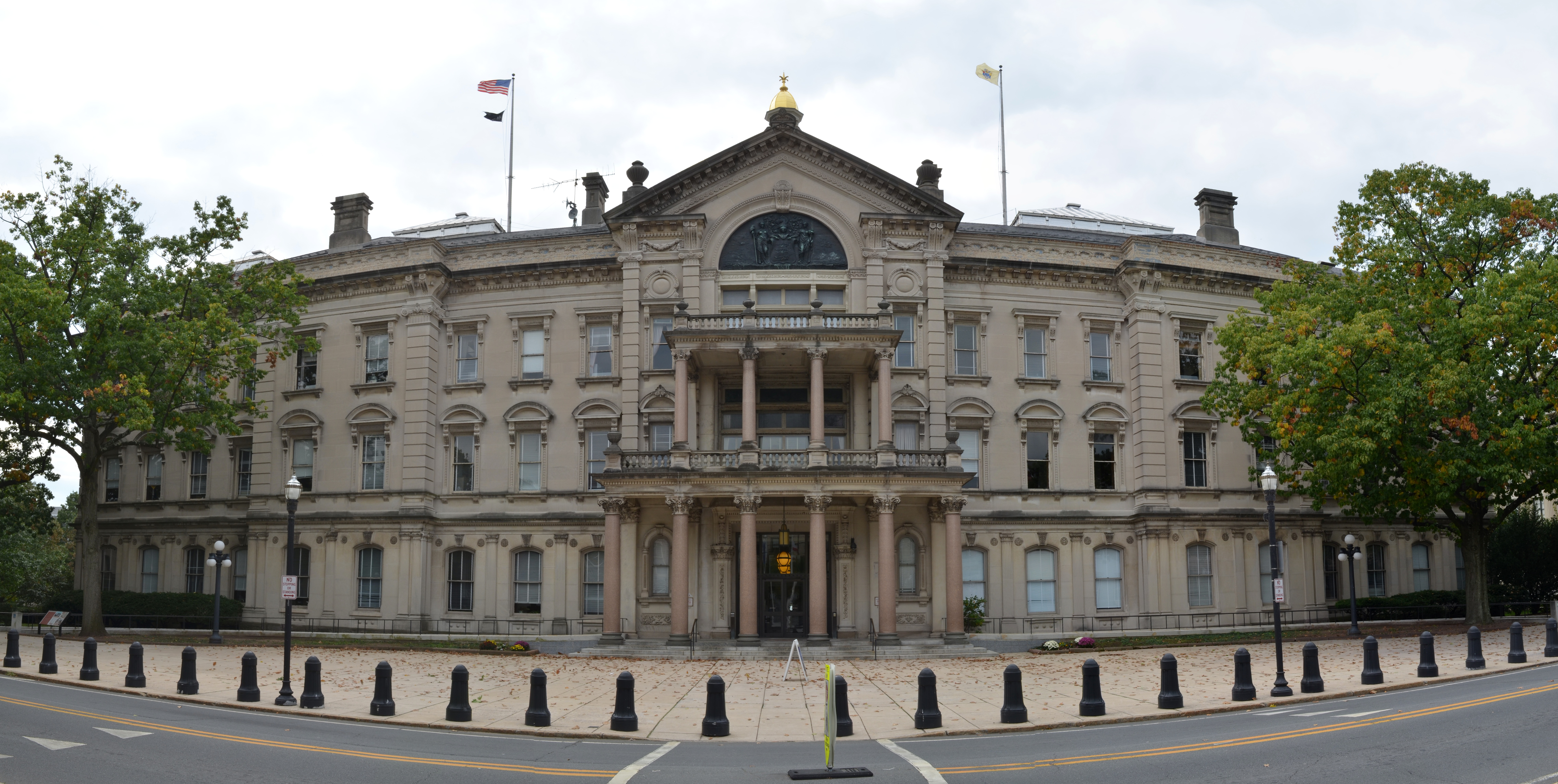
- The New Jersey State House in 2012

Overview
- Legislative body: New Jersey Legislature
- Jurisdiction: New Jersey, United States
- Term: January 9, 2024 – January 13, 2026

New Jersey General Assembly
- Members: 80
- Speaker: Craig Coughlin
- Majority Leader: Louis Greenwald
- Minority Leader: John DiMaio
- Party control: Democratic Party

New Jersey Senate
- Members: 40
- President: Nicholas Scutari
- Majority Leader: Teresa Ruiz
- Minority Leader: Anthony M. Bucco
- Party control: Democratic Party

The 221st New Jersey Legislature began on January 9, 2024, following the 2023 elections for Assembly and Senate. It ended on January 13, 2026.

This was the first session of the state legislature where legislators will represent districts in the new legislative map that will be used until the 2031 election cycle.

The members of the Assembly will serve two-year terms through the end of the legislative session in January 2026 while members of the Senate elected in 2023 will serve four-year terms that will expire in January 2028 at the conclusion of the 222nd legislative session.

Of the 120 members of the legislature in the 220th legislative session, a third of them (40 members) changed from that legislative term to this one, the highest turnover rate in several years. This does include six legislators who moved up from the Assembly to the Senate. The rest of those 40 officeholders either did not run for re-election (some of which were to run for other elected offices not in the state legislature and others were due to the loss of party support as part of redistricting) or lost re-election in the primary election in June 2023 or the general election in November 2023.

A number of changes in the legislative membership occurred in 2024. Assemblyman Herb Conaway of the 7th District was elected to succeed Andy Kim in the United States House of Representatives; Balvir Singh was elected to succeed Conaway in the Assembly. Senator Nellie Pou of the 35th District was elected to succeed Bill Pascrell in the United States House of Representatives; Benjie Wimberly moved from the Assembly to the Senate to succeed Pou, and Al Abdelaziz was in turn elected to Wimberly's vacated Assembly seat. Finally, Pamela Rosen Lampitt of the 6th District was elected as the County Clerk of Camden County; Melinda Kane was elected to succeed Lampitt.

== Assembly ==
=== Assembly composition ===
| Starting January 9, 2024 | Affiliation | Members |
|---|---|---|
| Starting January 9, 2024 | Democratic Party | 52 |
| Starting January 9, 2024 | Republican Party | 28 |
| Starting January 9, 2024 | Total | 80 |

=== Assembly leadership and committee chairs ===
==== Democratic caucus ====
As announced by Assembly Speaker Craig J. Coughlin:

- Majority Leader: Louis D. Greenwald (District 6)
- Speaker Pro Tempore: Annette Quijano (District 20)
- Majority Conference Leader: Linda S. Carter (District 22)
- Majority Whip: Carol Murphy (District 7)
- Assembly Appropriations Chair: Lisa Swain (District 38)
- Policy Chair: Gary S. Schaer (District 36)
- Assembly Budget Chair: Eliana Pintor Marin (District 29)
- Constituent Outreach Chair: Verlina Reynolds-Jackson (District 15)
- Deputy Speakers: Wayne DeAngelo (District 14), Yvonne Lopez (District 19), William B. Sampson IV (District 31), Gary S. Schaer (District 36), and Shanique Speight (District 29)
- Deputy Majority Leaders: Reginald Atkins (District 20), Roy Freiman (District 16), William F. Moen, Jr. (District 5), Chris Tully (District 38), and Anthony S. Verrelli (District 15)
- Deputy Conference Leaders: Shama Haider (District 37) and Tennille R. McCoy (District 14)
- Parliamentarian: Ellen J. Park (District 37)
- Deputy Parliamentarian: Sterley S. Stanley (District 18)
- Deputy Whips: Clinton Calabrese (District 36) and Joe Danielsen (District 17)

==== Republican caucus ====
- Minority Leader: John DiMaio (District 23)
- Deputy Minority Leader: Antwan L. McClellan (District 1)
- Minority Conference Leader: Christopher P. DePhillips (District 40)
- Minority Whip: Brian Bergen (District 26)
- Minority Budget Officer: Nancy F. Munoz (District 21)
- Minority Parliamentarian: Brian E. Rumpf (District 9)
- Minority Policy Chair: Gerry Scharfenberger (District 13)
- Minority Appropriations Officer: Jay Webber (District 26)
- Assistant Minority Leader: Robert D. Clifton (District 12)
- Deputy Minority Conference Leader: Victoria A. Flynn (District 13)
- Assistant Minority Conference Leaders: Michele Matsikoudis (District 21) and Christian E. Barranco (District 25)
- Deputy Minority Whip: Erik Peterson (District 23)
- Assistant Minority Whips: Donald A. Guardian (District 2) and Aura K. Dunn (District 25)

==== Committee chairs ====
As announced by Assembly Speaker Craig J. Coughlin:

- Aging and Human Services – Shanique Speight
- Appropriations – Lisa Swain
- Budget – Eliana Pintor Marin
- Children, Families and Food Security – Shama A. Haider
- Commerce, Economic Development and Agriculture – William W. Spearman
- Community Development and Women’s Affairs – Shavonda E. Sumter
- Consumer Affairs – William B. Sampson IV
- Education – Verlina Reynolds-Jackson
- Environment, Natural Resources, and Solid Waste – James J. Kennedy
- Financial Institutions – Roy Freiman
- Health – Carol A. Murphy
- Higher Education – Linda S. Carter
- Housing – Yvonne Lopez
- Judiciary – Ellen J. Park
- Labor – Anthony S. Verrelli
- Military and Veterans Affairs – Cleopatra G. Tucker
- Oversight, Reform and Federal Relations – Reginald W. Atkins
- Public Safety and Preparedness – Joe Danielsen
- Regulated Professions – Sterley S. Stanley
- Science, Innovation and Technology – Chris Tully
- State and Local Government – Robert J. Karabinchak
- Telecommunications and Utilities – Wayne P. DeAngelo
- Tourism, Gaming and the Arts – William F. Moen, Jr.
- Transportation and Independent Authorities – Clinton Calabrese

=== Assembly members ===
The Assembly consists of 80 members, two for each district.

| Legislative District | Assembly Member | Party | Assumed Office | Counties represented | Residence |
|---|---|---|---|---|---|
| District 1 | Erik Simonsen | Republican | January 14, 2020 | Atlantic, Cape May, Cumberland | Lower Township |
| District 1 | Antwan McClellan | Republican | January 14, 2020 | Atlantic, Cape May, Cumberland | Ocean City |
| District 2 | Claire Swift | Republican | January 11, 2022 | Atlantic | Margate City |
| District 2 | Don Guardian | Republican | January 11, 2022 | Atlantic | Atlantic City |
| District 3 | Heather Simmons | Democratic | January 9, 2024 | Cumberland, Gloucester Salem | Glassboro |
| District 3 | David Bailey | Democratic | January 9, 2024 | Cumberland, Gloucester Salem | Woodstown |
| District 4 | Dan Hutchison | Democratic | January 9, 2024 | Atlantic, Camden, Gloucester | Gloucester Township |
| District 4 | Cody Miller | Democratic | January 9, 2024 | Atlantic, Camden, Gloucester | Monroe Township |
| District 5 | William Spearman | Democratic | June 30, 2018 | Camden, Gloucester | Camden |
| District 5 | Bill Moen | Democratic | January 14, 2020 | Camden, Gloucester | Camden |
| District 6 | Louis Greenwald | Democratic | January 10, 2012 | Burlington, Camden | Voorhees Township |
| District 6 | Melinda Kane | Democratic | January 23, 2025 | Burlington, Camden | Cherry Hill |
| District 7 | Balvir Singh | Democratic | January 30, 2025 | Burlington | Burlington Township |
| District 7 | Carol A. Murphy | Democratic | January 9, 2018 | Burlington | Mount Laurel |
| District 8 | Michael Torrissi | Republican | January 11, 2022 | Atlantic, Burlington | Hammonton |
| District 8 | Andrea Katz | Democratic | January 9, 2024 | Atlantic, Burlington | Chesterfield Township |
| District 9 | Brian E. Rumpf | Republican | June 23, 2003 | Ocean | Little Egg Harbor |
| District 9 | Greg Myhre | Republican | January 9, 2024 | Ocean | Stafford |
| District 10 | Gregory P. McGuckin | Republican | January 10, 2012 | Ocean, Monmouth | Toms River |
| District 10 | Paul Kanitra | Republican | January 9, 2024 | Ocean, Monmouth | Point Pleasant Beach |
| District 11 | Margie Donlon | Democratic | January 9, 2024 | Monmouth | Ocean Township |
| District 11 | Luanne Peterpaul | Democratic | January 9, 2024 | Monmouth | Long Branch |
| District 12 | Alex Sauickie | Republican | July 23, 2022 | Burlington, Middlesex, Ocean | Jackson Township |
| District 12 | Robert D. Clifton | Republican | January 10, 2012 | Burlington, Middlesex, Ocean | Matawan |
| District 13 | Vicky Flynn | Republican | January 11, 2022 | Monmouth | Holmdel |
| District 13 | Gerard Scharfenberger | Republican | January 14, 2020 | Monmouth | Middletown |
| District 14 | Wayne DeAngelo | Democratic | January 8, 2008 | Mercer, Middlesex | Hamilton Township |
| District 14 | Tennille McCoy | Democratic | January 8, 2024 | Mercer, Middlesex | Hamilton Township |
| District 15 | Verlina Reynolds-Jackson | Democratic | February 15, 2018 | Hunterdon, Mercer | Trenton |
| District 15 | Anthony Verrelli | Democratic | August 5, 2018 | Hunterdon, Mercer | Hopewell Township |
| District 16 | Mitchelle Drulis | Democratic | January 9, 2024 | Hunterdon, Mercer, Middlesex, Somerset | East Amwell |
| District 16 | Roy Freiman | Democratic | January 9, 2018 | Hunterdon, Mercer, Middlesex, Somerset | Hillsborough Township |
| District 17 | Joseph Danielsen | Democratic | October 16, 2014 | Middlesex, Somerset | Franklin Township |
| District 17 | Kevin Egan | Democratic | January 9, 2024 | Middlesex, Somerset | New Brunswick |
| District 18 | Sterley Stanley | Democratic | January 27, 2021 | Middlesex | East Brunswick |
| District 18 | Robert Karabinchak | Democratic | May 26, 2016 | Middlesex | Edison |
| District 19 | Craig Coughlin | Democratic | January 12, 2010 | Middlesex | Woodbridge |
| District 19 | Yvonne Lopez | Democratic | January 9, 2018 | Middlesex | Perth Amboy |
| District 20 | Annette Quijano | Democratic | September 25, 2008 | Union | Elizabeth |
| District 20 | Reginald Atkins | Democratic | January 11, 2022 | Union | Roselle |
| District 21 | Michele Matsikoudis | Republican | January 11, 2022 | Middlesex, Morris, Somerset, Union | New Providence |
| District 21 | Nancy Munoz | Republican | May 21, 2009 | Middlesex, Morris, Somerset, Union | Summit |
| District 22 | James J. Kennedy | Democratic | January 12, 2016 | Somerset, Union | Rahway |
| District 22 | Linda S. Carter | Democratic | May 24, 2018 | Somerset, Union | Plainfield |
| District 23 | Erik Peterson | Republican | December 7, 2009 | Hunterdon, Somerset, Warren | Franklin Township |
| District 23 | John DiMaio | Republican | February 21, 2009 | Hunterdon, Somerset, Warren | Hackettstown |
| District 24 | Dawn Fantasia | Republican | January 9, 2024 | Morris, Sussex, Warren | Franklin Borough |
| District 24 | Mike Inganamort | Republican | January 9, 2024 | Morris, Sussex, Warren | Chester Township |
| District 25 | Aura Dunn | Republican | November 21, 2019 ‡ | Morris, Passaic | Mendham Borough |
| District 25 | Christian Barranco | Republican | January 11, 2022 | Morris, Passaic | Jefferson |
| District 26 | Brian Bergen | Republican | January 14, 2020 | Morris, Passaic | Denville |
| District 26 | Jay Webber | Republican | January 8, 2008 | Morris, Passaic | Morris Plains |
| District 27 | Rosy Bagolie | Democratic | January 9, 2024 | Essex, Passaic | Livingston |
| District 27 | Alixon Collazos-Gill | Democratic | January 9, 2024 | Essex, Passaic | Montclair |
| District 28 | Cleopatra Tucker | Democratic | January 8, 2008 | Essex, Union | Newark |
| District 28 | Garnet Hall | Democratic | January 9, 2024 | Essex, Union | Maplewood |
| District 29 | Eliana Pintor Marin | Democratic | September 11, 2013 | Essex, Hudson | Newark |
| District 29 | Shanique Speight | Democratic | January 9, 2018 | Essex, Hudson | Newark |
| District 30 | Sean T. Kean | Republican | January 10, 2012 ± | Monmouth, Ocean | Wall |
| District 30 | Avi Schnall | Democratic | January 9, 2024 | Monmouth, Ocean | Lakewood Township |
| District 31 | Barbara McCann Stamato | Democratic | January 9, 2024 | Hudson | Jersey City |
| District 31 | William Sampson | Democratic | January 11, 2022 | Hudson | Bayonne |
| District 32 | Jessica Ramirez | Democratic | January 9, 2024 | Hudson | Jersey City |
| District 32 | John Allen | Democratic | January 9, 2024 | Hudson | Hoboken |
| District 33 | Gabe Rodriguez | Democratic | January 9, 2024 | Hudson | West New York |
| District 33 | Julio Marenco | Democratic | January 9, 2024 | Hudson | North Bergen |
| District 34 | Michael Venezia | Democratic | January 9, 2024 | Essex | Bloomfield |
| District 34 | Carmen Morales | Democratic | January 9, 2024 | Essex | Belleville |
| District 35 | Shavonda E. Sumter | Democratic | January 10, 2012 | Bergen, Passaic | North Haledon |
| District 35 | Al Abdelaziz | Democratic | January 23, 2025 | Bergen, Passaic | Paterson |
| District 36 | Gary Schaer | Democratic | January 10, 2006 | Bergen, Passaic | Passaic |
| District 36 | Clinton Calabrese | Democratic | February 10, 2018 | Bergen, Passaic | Cliffside Park |
| District 37 | Ellen Park | Democratic | January 11, 2022 | Bergen | Englewood Cliffs |
| District 37 | Shama Haider | Democratic | January 11, 2022 | Bergen | Tenafly |
| District 38 | Lisa Swain | Democratic | May 24, 2018 | Bergen | Fair Lawn |
| District 38 | Chris Tully | Democratic | May 24, 2018 | Bergen | Bergenfield |
| District 39 | John V. Azzariti | Republican | January 9, 2024 | Bergen | Saddle River |
| District 39 | Robert Auth | Republican | January 14, 2014 | Bergen | Old Tappan |
| District 40 | Al Barlas | Republican | January 9, 2024 | Bergen, Passaic | Cedar Grove |
| District 40 | Christopher DePhillips | Republican | January 9, 2018 | Bergen, Passaic | Wyckoff |

‡ Dunn was appointed to the seat in November 2019. The appointment expired at the conclusion of the 2018–19 term in January 2020. She was reappointed again in February 2020 after the start of the next term and then won the seat in a special election in November 2020.
± Kean previously served in the Assembly from 2002 to 2008

== Senate ==
=== Senate composition ===
| Starting January 9, 2024 | Affiliation | Members |
|---|---|---|
| Starting January 9, 2024 | Democratic Party | 25 |
| Starting January 9, 2024 | Republican Party | 15 |
| Starting January 9, 2024 | Total | 40 |

=== Senate leadership ===
==== Democratic caucus ====
- Majority Leader: M. Theresa Ruiz (District 29)
- Assistant Majority Leaders: James Beach (District 6), Linda R. Greenstein (District 14) and Gordon M. Johnson (District 37)
- Deputy Majority Leader: Paul A. Sarlo (District 36)
- Senate President Pro Tempore: Shirley K. Turner (District 15)
- Democratic Conference Chair: Vin Gopal (District 11)
- Majority Whip: Troy Singleton (District 7)

==== Republican caucus ====
- Minority Leader: Anthony M. Bucco (District 25)
- Deputy Republican Leaders: Robert W. Singer (District 30) and Joseph Pennacchio (District 26)
- Conference Leader: Holly T. Schepisi (District 39)
- Budget Officer: Declan J. O'Scanlon, Jr. (District 13)
- Ranking Member Judiciary Committee: Kristin M. Corrado (District 40)
- Republican Whip: Michael L. Testa Jr. (District 1)
- Deputy Conference Leader: Vincent J. Polistina (District 2)

==== Committee chairs ====
As announced by Senate President Nick Scutari:

- Budget and Appropriations: Paul Sarlo
- Community and Urban Affairs: Troy Singleton
- Commerce: Joseph Lagana
- Economic Growth: Nilsa Cruz-Perez
- Education: Vin Gopal
- Environment and Energy: Bob Smith
- Health, Human Services, and Senior Citizens: Joe F. Vitale
- Higher Education: Joseph Cryan
- Judiciary: Brian Stack
- Labor: Gordon Johnson
- Law and Public Safety: Linda Greenstein
- Military and Veterans: Raj Mukerhji
- Senate Legislative Oversight: Andrew Zwicker
- State Government, Wagering, and Historic Preservation: James Beach
- Transportation: Patrick J. Diegnan

=== Senate members ===
The Senate consists of 40 members, one for each district.

| District | Senator | Party | Assumed office | Counties represented | Residence |
|---|---|---|---|---|---|
| District 1 | Mike Testa | Republican | December 5, 2019 | Atlantic, Cape May, Cumberland | Vineland |
| District 2 | Vincent J. Polistina | Republican | November 8, 2021 | Atlantic | Egg Harbor Township |
| District 3 | John Burzichelli | Democratic | January 9, 2024 | Cumberland, Gloucester Salem | Paulsboro |
| District 4 | Paul D. Moriarty | Democratic | January 9, 2024 | Atlantic, Camden, Gloucester | Washington Township |
| District 5 | Nilsa Cruz-Perez | Democratic | December 15, 2014 | Camden, Gloucester | Barrington |
| District 6 | James Beach | Democratic | January 3, 2009 | Burlington, Camden | Voorhees Township |
| District 7 | Troy Singleton | Democratic | January 9, 2018 | Burlington | Palmyra |
| District 8 | Latham Tiver | Republican | January 9, 2024 | Atlantic, Burlington | Southampton |
| District 9 | Carmen Amato | Republican | January 9, 2024 | Ocean | Lacey |
| District 10 | James W. Holzapfel | Republican | January 10, 2012 | Ocean, Monmouth | Toms River |
| District 11 | Vin Gopal | Democratic | January 9, 2018 | Monmouth | Long Branch |
| District 12 | Owen Henry | Republican | January 9, 2024 | Burlington, Middlesex, Ocean | Old Bridge Township |
| District 13 | Declan O'Scanlon | Republican | January 9, 2018 | Monmouth | Little Silver |
| District 14 | Linda R. Greenstein | Democratic | December 6, 2010 | Mercer, Middlesex | Plainsboro Township |
| District 15 | Shirley Turner | Democratic | January 13, 1998 | Hunterdon, Mercer | Lawrence Township |
| District 16 | Andrew Zwicker | Democratic | January 11, 2022 | Hunterdon, Mercer, Middlesex, Somerset | South Brunswick |
| District 17 | Bob Smith | Democratic | January 8, 2002 | Middlesex, Somerset | Piscataway |
| District 18 | Patrick J. Diegnan | Democratic | May 9, 2016 | Middlesex | South Plainfield |
| District 19 | Joe F. Vitale | Democratic | January 13, 1998 | Middlesex | Woodbridge |
| District 20 | Joseph Cryan | Democratic | January 9, 2018 | Union | Union Township |
| District 21 | Jon Bramnick | Republican | January 11, 2022 | Middlesex, Morris, Somerset, Union | Westfield |
| District 22 | Nicholas Scutari | Democratic | January 13, 2004 | Somerset, Union | Linden |
| District 23 | Doug Steinhardt | Republican | December 19, 2022 | Hunterdon, Somerset, Warren | Lopatcong |
| District 24 | Parker Space | Republican | January 9, 2024 | Morris, Sussex, Warren | Wantage |
| District 25 | Anthony M. Bucco | Republican | October 24, 2019 | Morris, Passaic | Boonton Township |
| District 26 | Joseph Pennacchio | Republican | January 8, 2008 | Morris, Passaic | Rockaway Township |
| District 27 | John F. McKeon | Democratic | January 9, 2024 | Essex, Passaic | West Orange |
| District 28 | Renee Burgess | Democratic | September 29, 2022 | Essex, Union | Irvington |
| District 29 | Teresa Ruiz | Democratic | January 8, 2008 | Essex, Hudson | Newark |
| District 30 | Robert W. Singer | Republican | October 14, 1993 | Monmouth, Ocean | Lakewood Township |
| District 31 | Angela V. McKnight | Democratic | January 9, 2024 | Hudson | Jersey City |
| District 32 | Raj Mukherji | Democratic | January 9, 2024 | Hudson | Jersey City |
| District 33 | Brian P. Stack | Democratic | January 8, 2008 | Hudson | Union City |
| District 34 | Britnee Timberlake | Democratic | January 9, 2024 | Essex | East Orange |
| District 35 | Benjie Wimberly | Democratic | January 30, 2025 | Bergen, Passaic | Paterson |
| District 36 | Paul Sarlo | Democratic | May 19, 2003 | Bergen, Passaic | Wood-Ridge |
| District 37 | Gordon M. Johnson | Democratic | January 11, 2022 | Bergen | Englewood |
| District 38 | Joseph Lagana | Democratic | April 12, 2018 | Bergen | Paramus |
| District 39 | Holly Schepisi | Republican | March 25, 2021 | Bergen | River Vale |
| District 40 | Kristin Corrado | Republican | October 5, 2017 | Bergen, Passaic | Totowa |

== See also ==
- List of New Jersey state legislatures
