= Monroe Jay Lustbader =

American politician

Member of the New Jersey General Assembly from the 21st district
- In office January 14, 1992 – March 16, 1996 Serving with Maureen Ogden (1992–1996); Kevin J. O'Toole (1996)
- Preceded by: Neil M. Cohen; Chuck Hardwick
- Succeeded by: Joel Weingarten

Member of the Essex County Board of Chosen Freeholders
- In office 1981–1992

Personal details
- Born: January 15, 1931 Kearny, New Jersey
- Died: March 16, 1996 (aged 65) Livingston, New Jersey
- Party: Republican
- Education: New York University; University of Mississippi; Rutgers Law School

Monroe Jay Lustbader (January 15, 1931 – March 16, 1996) was an American Republican Party politician who was elected to three terms in the New Jersey General Assembly, serving in office from 1992 until his death, where he represented the 21st Legislative District.

Born in Kearny, Lustbader attended New York University and the University of Mississippi, before receiving his degrees in law from Rutgers Law School. He was a resident of Millburn, New Jersey.

An attorney and real estate developer, Lustbader first ran for office in 1973, as the Republican candidate for Assemblyman in the newly created 26th district, which included West Orange, East Orange and Orange. He lost to Democrats Richard J. Codey, a future Governor of New Jersey who was running for his first term in the Legislature, and freshman Democratic Assemblyman Eldridge Hawkins. Codey received 30,282 votes, followed by Hawkins (28,102), Republican John F. Trezza (13,978) and Lustbader (12,502).

In 1981, Lustbader became the Republican candidate for the Essex County Board of Chosen Freeholders and was elected, defeating one-term Democratic incumbent Renee Lane. He was re-elected in 1984, 1987 and 1990.

Lustbader ran again for the State Assembly in 1991, this time in a newly drawn Essex County-Union County seat that favored the Republicans. Running with five-term Assemblywoman Maureen Ogden, he defeated incumbent Democratic Assemblyman Neil M. Cohen by more than 13,000 votes, 33,914 to 20,460. He was re-elected in 1993 and 1995.

A decision by the New Jersey Casino Control Commission in 1992 to allow round-the-clock gambling in New Jersey at Atlantic City's casinos angered Lustbader, who had proposed a bill that would limit 24-hour gambling to certain times of the year, stating that "there has to be a break in those hours to give the people a chance psychologically to cool off to avoid people losing the rent money in a froth".

In the face of increasing numbers of cars stolen in Newark, New Jersey, Lustbader chaired a task force that started in November 1992 aimed at developing bipartisan legislation to address the problem of auto theft and carjacking. The task force recommended boot camp programs for first-time offenders and would impose as much as 10 years in jail for those convicted of eluding police or joyriding and would make parents liable for damages resulting from car thefts if parents "do not reasonably supervise and control the children". Lustbader stated that "kids who are old enough to steal cars are old enough to face severe consequences".

Under legislation co-sponsored in the Assembly by Lustbader in 1995, falsehoods in political advertisements made with "reckless disregard to validity" would be an offense that would expose violators to up to six months in jail and fines as high as $1,000. Lustbader argued that "vicious and deliberately false statements made during a campaign" are not protected forms of free speech guaranteed by the First Amendment.

Legislation proposed by Lustbader in 1995 targeted "welfare shopping", a practice in which families from outside New Jersey move to the state to take advantage of its more liberal welfare grants. Under the bill proposed by Lustbader, those who move to New Jersey would be subject to a reduction of 25% in the standard welfare allowance until they had resided in the state for nine months, despite three prior rulings by the U.S. Supreme Court that waiting periods or benefit reductions for new state residents violated Constitutional guarantees of freedom of movement. The bill had been approved in the Assembly and failed by one vote in its first attempt at passage in the New Jersey Senate.

Lustbader died at age 65 on March 16, 1996, at Saint Barnabas Medical Center in Livingston, New Jersey due to kidney cancer. He had kept his condition from his colleagues in the Assembly and continued to work long hours until shortly before his death. In a November 1996 special election, Joel Weingarten was elected to the Assembly, defeating Democratic candidate Robert R. Peacock to fill the one year remaining on Lustbader's vacant seat.

== Electoral history ==
=== New Jersey General Assembly ===
21st Legislative District general election, 1991
Party	Candidate	Votes	%
Republican	Maureen Ogden	34,282	32.4
Republican	Monroe Jay Lustbader	33,914	32.06
Democratic	Neil M. Cohen (incumbent)	20,460	19.34
Democratic	Frank Covello	15,928	15.06
Populist	Bill Ciccone	1,212	1.15
Total votes		105,796	100
