= Edward K. Gill =

American politician

Edward Kent Gill (November 14, 1917 – February 9, 1985) was an American Republican Party politician who served as Mayor of Cranford, New Jersey and was elected to two terms of office in the New Jersey General Assembly, from 1982 until his death, where he represented the 21st Legislative District.

== Biography ==
Gill was born in England on November 14, 1917. He was raised in Newark, and attended Weequahic High School before serving in the United States Air Force during World War II. Gill earned his undergraduate degree from Rutgers University and was awarded a Master of Business Administration degree from New York University. He started working at Western Electric in the 1930s, and during his four decades there was promoted to director, retiring from the company in 1979. for 40 years, retiring in 1979 as a director.

Active in many Cranford community organizations, Gill was president of the Taxpayers Association, and served on the Housing Board and the Board of Health. He served as the township's mayor from 1967 to 1970. He was elected to the State Assembly in 1981, seeking an open seat when incumbent C. Louis Bassano ran for the State Senate. Gill and his running mate, Chuck Hardwick, defeated Democrats Edward Jonathan Bell and John D. Mollozzi by a wide margin. In 1983, Hardwick and Gill defeated Democrats Barbara Brande and Eugene J. Carmody. Gill won by a relatively narrow 2,509 votes over Brande, who had been the first woman to serve as Mayor of Cranford. He had announced that he would not run for a third term in the Assembly.

Gill died at age 67 on February 9, 1985, at Muhlenberg Hospital in Plainfield, New Jersey due to heart disease. He was survived by his wife, the former Margaret Lizzotte, as well as by a daughter, four sons and three grandchildren.
