= Thomas Kean Jr. =

American politician (born 1968)

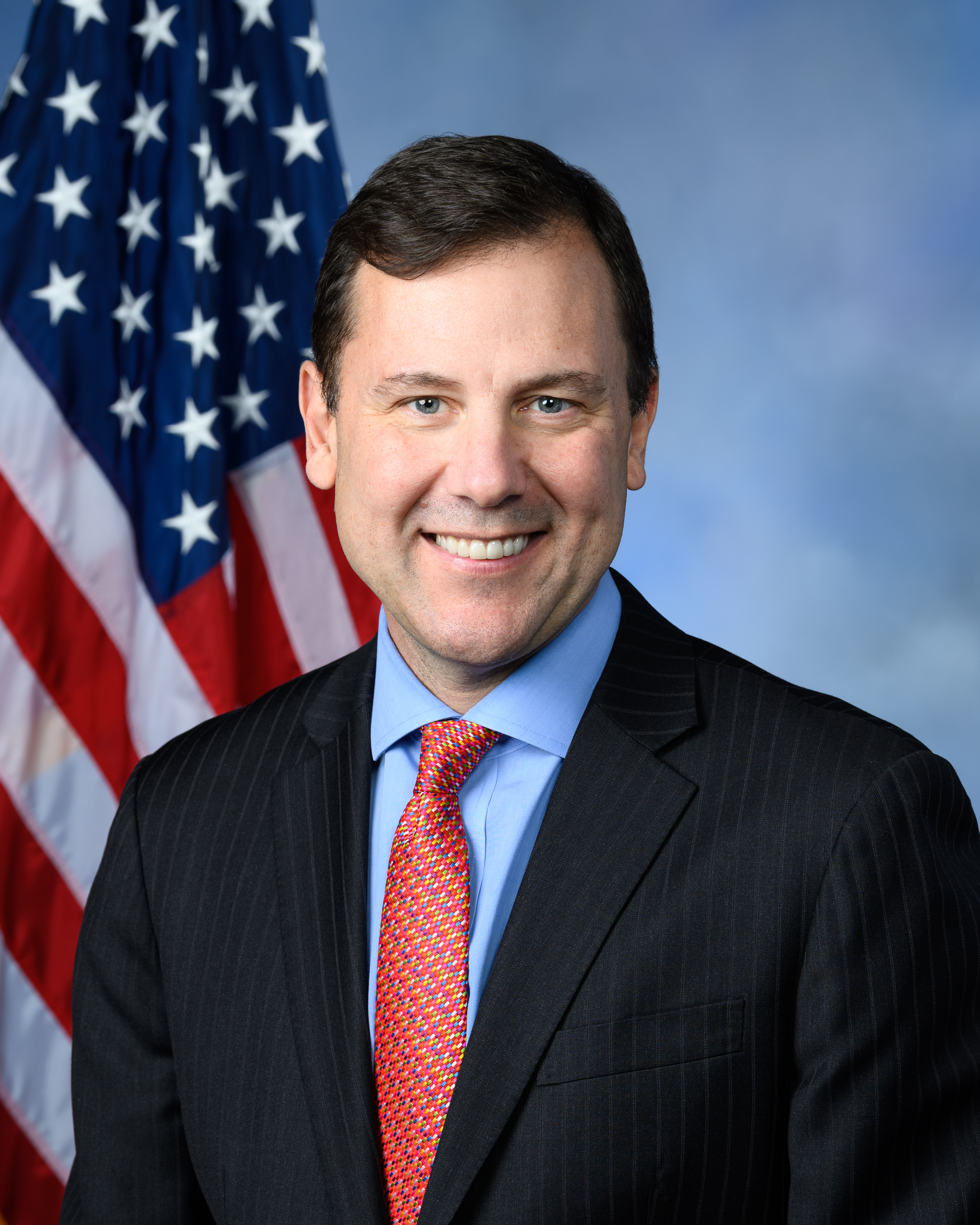
- Official portrait, 2023

Member of the U.S. House of Representatives from New Jersey's 7th district
- Incumbent
- Assumed office January 3, 2023
- Preceded by: Tom Malinowski

Minority Leader of the New Jersey Senate
- In office January 8, 2008 – January 11, 2022
- Preceded by: Leonard Lance
- Succeeded by: Steve Oroho

Member of the New Jersey Senate from the 21st district
- In office March 1, 2003 – January 11, 2022
- Preceded by: Rich Bagger
- Succeeded by: Jon Bramnick

Member of the New Jersey General Assembly
- In office April 19, 2001 – March 1, 2003
- Preceded by: Alan Augustine
- Succeeded by: Jon Bramnick
- Constituency: 22nd district (2001–2002); 21st district (2002–2003)

Personal details
- Born: Thomas Howard Kean Jr. September 5, 1968 (age 58) Livingston, New Jersey, U.S.
- Party: Republican
- Spouse: Rhonda Norton (m. 1994)
- Children: 2
- Parent(s): Thomas Kean (father); Deborah Kean (mother)
- Relatives: Robert Kean (grandfather); Leslie Kean (cousin) Livingston family
- Education: Dartmouth College (BA); Tufts University (MA)
- Website: House website Campaign website
- Kean's voice Kean on International Holocaust Remembrance Day. Recorded April 18, 2023

Thomas Howard Kean Jr. (/keɪn/ KAYN; born September 5, 1968) is an American politician serving as the U.S. representative for New Jersey's 7th congressional district since 2023. A member of the Republican Party, he previously represented New Jersey's 21st legislative district in the New Jersey Senate from 2003 to 2022, serving as minority leader from 2008 to 2022, and represented the same district in the New Jersey General Assembly from 2001 to 2003.

First elected to the New Jersey General Assembly in 2001, he was later elected to the New Jersey Senate in 2003. In 2006, Kean ran for U.S. Senate, losing to interim senator Bob Menendez. In January 2008, Kean became minority leader of the New Jersey Senate. After Governor Chris Christie's re-election in 2013, Christie unsuccessfully tried to remove him as minority leader. Kean was frequently named as a potential candidate for governor in 2017, but he did not run. He is a moderate member of the Republican Party.

Kean was first elected to Congress in 2022, defeating incumbent Democrat Tom Malinowski in a rematch, re-elected in 2024 against former New Jersey Working Families Party director Sue Altman, and was defeated in 2026 by Rebecca Bennett.

== Early life and education ==
Kean was born in Livingston, New Jersey, on September 5, 1968. His parents are Deborah (née Bye) and Thomas Kean. His father served as governor of New Jersey from 1982 to 1990. His grandfather Robert Kean was a former congressman from New Jersey. Through his father, he is also a descendant of William Livingston, the state's first governor.

Kean grew up on the family's estate in Livingston. He has two siblings. He graduated from the Pingry School.

Kean is also a graduate of Dartmouth College, where he was a member of the Psi Upsilon fraternity, and holds a Master of Arts in Law and Diplomacy from the Fletcher School of Law and Diplomacy at Tufts University.

=== Early career ===
Kean was an aide to former Congressman Bob Franks and a special assistant at the United States Environmental Protection Agency (EPA) in the George H. W. Bush administration.

== New Jersey Assembly ==
Kean was appointed to the General Assembly, the lower house of the New Jersey Legislature, in April 2001, to serve out the unexpired term of Alan Augustine, who had resigned on March 21, 2001, for health reasons. He was elected to a full term in the Assembly in November 2001. In the Assembly, he chaired the Republican Policy Committee and served as vice chair of the State Government Committee.

== New Jersey Senate ==
=== Tenure ===
In March 2003, Kean was appointed to the New Jersey Senate to serve out the unexpired term of Rich Bagger, and won election to that Senate seat in November 2003. In 2004, he was elected Senate Minority Whip, a position he held until 2007. He served in the Senate on the Health, Human Services and Senior Citizens Committee.

Kean was one of six Republicans in the state senate to vote for a 2019 appropriations bill that passed 31 to 6.

==== Committees ====
- Commerce
- Higher Education
- Legislative Oversight
- Legislative Services Commission

== 2006 U.S. Senate campaign ==
Kean was the Republican nominee for the United States Senate seat vacated by former U.S. senator and former governor of New Jersey Jon Corzine, a seat that was filled by Corzine's designated replacement, Bob Menendez. Kean won the June 6, 2006, primary against John P. Ginty by a 3–1 margin. He lost the general election to Menendez, 53.3% to 44.3%. The race was the narrowest victory for an incumbent Democrat in the U.S. in an election that saw Democrats retake control of the Senate as part of a nationwide backlash against the Bush administration. He was endorsed by the Courier-Post, The Press of Atlantic City, and Asbury Park Press.

== U.S House of Representatives ==
=== Elections ===
==== 2000 ====
Kean sought the Republican nomination for New Jersey's 7th congressional district, but lost the primary to Mike Ferguson by about 4,000 votes, finishing second in a field of four candidates.

==== 2020 ====
On April 16, 2019, Kean announced that he was running for New Jersey's 7th congressional district in 2020, challenging first-term Democratic incumbent Tom Malinowski. In the first quarter of 2019, Kean nearly matched Malinowski's fundraising total of over $500,000. In August 2019, Kean was endorsed by House Minority Leader Kevin McCarthy. Kean won the Republican primary over token opposition, and narrowly lost to Malinowski in the general election. It was the closest House race in New Jersey and one of the closest in the country. Due to the close margin and slow counting of mail-in and provisional ballots, the outcome remained in doubt until nearly two weeks after the election.

==== 2022 ====
Kean announced in February 2021 that he would not seek reelection to the State Senate and immediately became the subject of speculation that he was preparing to run for New Jersey's 7th congressional district again. Malinowski was under scrutiny after his failure to disclose more than 100 stock trades became a national news story and led to a complaint filed with the House Ethics Committee. In redistricting, the 7th district was made more Republican while the neighboring 11th and 5th districts became more solidly Democratic. Kean formally announced his campaign on July 14, 2021, joined by U.S. House Minority Leader Kevin McCarthy. He won the Republican primary in June 2022 and the general election with 51.4% (159,392 votes) to Malinowski's 48.6% (150,701 votes).

==== 2024 ====
Kean won reelection in 2024 against Democratic nominee Sue Altman, a former leader of the New Jersey's Working Families Party.

==== 2026 ====
Kean is a candidate for reelection in 2026. He has been endorsed by Donald Trump. He lost to Democratic candidate Rebecca Bennett in the general election.

There was widespread media coverage as Kean was absent from Congress and was not seen in public from March 6, 2026, until June 30, 2026. In a June 30 return to the floor of the U.S. House, he said a depression diagnosis and subsequent hospitalization led to his absence from Congress.

Cook Political Report had described the seat as a "toss up" in an analysis published before his absence began and individuals connected to the Republican Party expressed concerns about the party's ability to hold on to a majority in Congress without a Kean victory in November.

=== Tenure ===
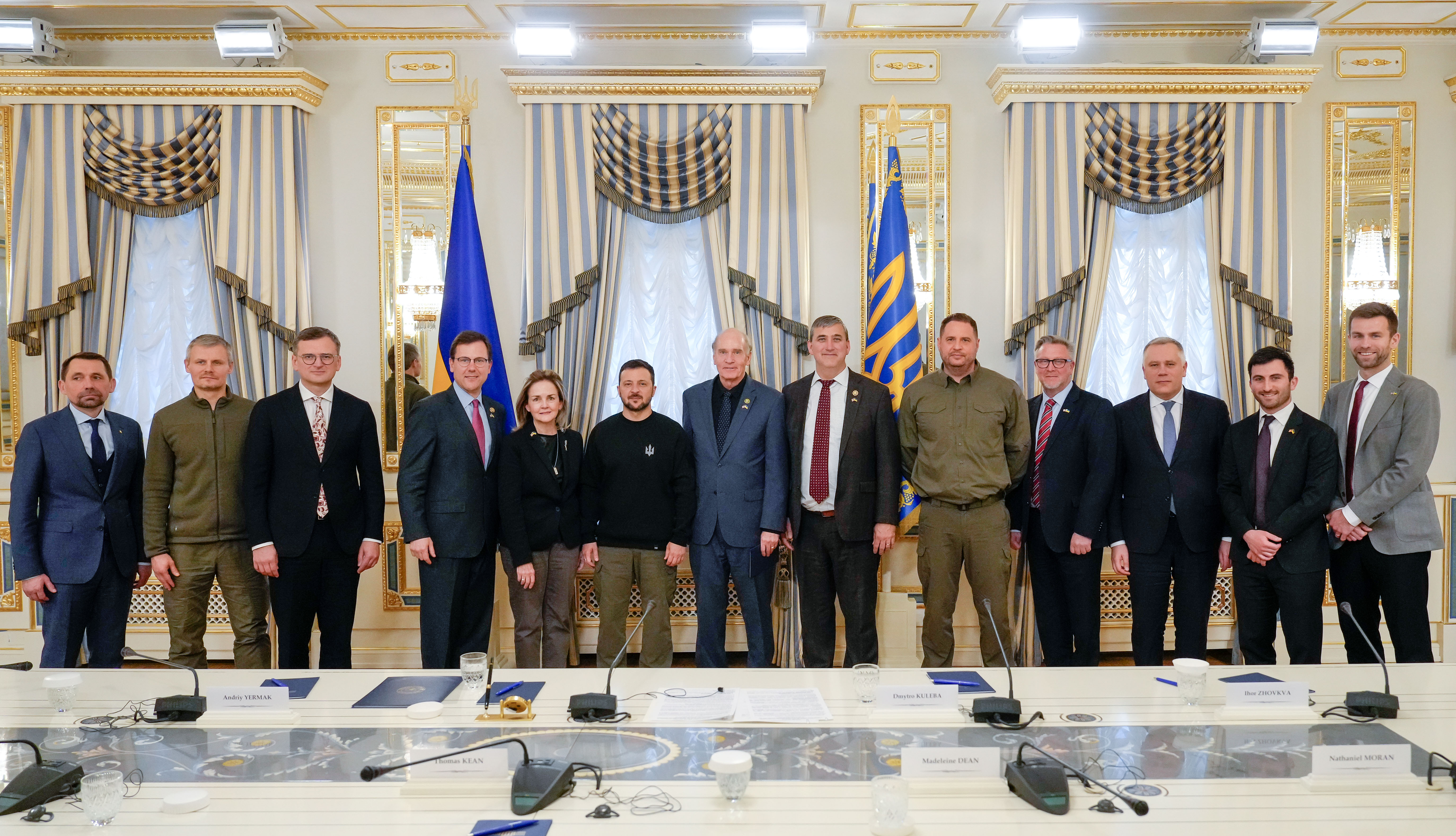
Kean (4th from left) and other members of Congress with Ukrainian President Volodymyr Zelenskyy in April 2024

Kean is a member of the Republican Main Street Partnership, and joined the Problem Solvers Caucus. Kean said he joined the caucus to assure constituents that he remains committed to "working across the aisle".

Sue Altman, his opponent in the 2024 election, and other critics have called Kean out for not holding in-person town halls. Fred Snowflack of Insider NJ minimized the potential negative impact on Kean, reporting that "Dating back to last fall's campaign, most of those griping about Kean's incommunicado ways were the media and voters who probably were not going to support him anyway."

During his 2022 election campaign, Kean, who self-describes as pro-choice, promised voters that he would support abortion rights. After the Dobbs decision, he said "this decision is now best to happen on the state level." During his tenure, he voted against the Women's Health Protection Act which would have codified the abortion rights that the Supreme Court overturned. He voted for the Born-Alive Abortion Survivors Protection Act, which would penalize healthcare practitioners who fail to provide care for an infant that is born-alive from an abortion attempt. Kean has expressed support for IVF and introduced legislation to provide income tax credits to people undergoing fertility treatments.

On October 5, 2023, Kean signed a letter to the House Agriculture Committee along with 15 House Republicans opposing the inclusion of the Ending Agricultural Trade Suppression (EATS) Act in the 2023 farm bill. The EATS Act, introduced in response to the California farm animal welfare law Proposition 12, would have overturned state and local animal welfare laws restricting the sale of agricultural goods from animals raised in battery cages, gestation crates, and veal crates. The letter argued that the legislation would undermine states' rights and cede control over U.S. agricultural policy to the Chinese-owned pork producer WH Group and its subsidiary Smithfield Foods.

In 2024, Kean, one of 17 House Republicans representing a district that voted for Joe Biden in the 2020 presidential election, endorsed Donald Trump.

In 2026, Kean voted in favor of legislation extending Affordable Care Act premium tax credits, joining 16 other Republicans supporting the bill.

In February 2026, Kean supported Trump's initial strikes in the 2026 Iran war. Kean has voted against multiple resolutions concerning presidential war powers in the context of that war.

=== Absence from office amid treatment for depression ===
Kean was absent from Congress from March 6 until June 30, 2026, missing more than 100 votes as members of Congress may not cast votes remotely. Kean was not seen in public or photographed during his absence.

In early June, House speaker Mike Johnson disclosed that Kean had shared details of his medical condition with him and that Kean requested that Johnson not publicly divulge the information; Johnson honored Kean's wishes.

During this absence, Kean reported his personal stock trading activity, which is managed by independent financial professionals, and submitted expenses for staff travel in Las Vegas and personal travel in San Francisco.

On June 30, Kean returned to Congress and announced he had been diagnosed with depression in early spring 2026. He explained that he had been hospitalized to treat his depression and that he had originally expected to return to work quickly, but his doctors had recommended he remain in the hospital to continue receiving treatment.

=== Committee assignments ===
For the 119th Congress:

- Committee on Foreign Affairs
  - Subcommittee on Middle East and North Africa
  - Subcommittee on South and Central Asia
- Committee on Energy & Commerce
  - Subcommittee on Commerce, Manufacturing, and Trade
  - Subcommittee on Communications and Technology
  - Subcommittee on Health

=== Caucus memberships ===
- Problem Solvers Caucus
- Climate Solutions Caucus

== Personal life ==
Kean is an Episcopalian. On November 12, 1994, he married Rhonda Lee Norton; they have two children and have lived in Westfield, New Jersey, since 2006.

== Electoral history ==
=== United States House of Representatives ===
2024 United States House of Representatives elections in New Jersey: District 7
Party	Candidate	Votes	%
Republican	Thomas Kean Jr. (incumbent)	223,331	51.8
Democratic	Sue Altman	200,025	46.4
Green	Andrew Black	4,258	1.0
Libertarian	Lana Leguia	3,784	0.9
Total votes		431,398	100.0
Republican hold			

2022 United States House of Representatives elections in New Jersey: District 7
Party	Candidate	Votes	%
Republican	Thomas Kean Jr.	159,392	51.4%
Democratic	Tom Malinowski (incumbent)	150,701	48.6%
Republican gain from Democratic			

2020 United States House of Representatives elections in New Jersey: District 7
Party	Candidate	Votes	%
Democratic	Tom Malinowski (incumbent)	219,688	50.6
Republican	Thomas Kean Jr.	214,359	49.4
Democratic hold			

=== New Jersey Senate ===
New Jersey State Senate elections, 2017
Party	Candidate	Votes	%
Republican	Thomas Kean Jr. (Incumbent)	37,579	54.7
Democratic	Jill Lazare	31,123	45.3
Republican hold			

New Jersey State Senate elections, 2013
Party	Candidate	Votes	%
Republican	Thomas Kean Jr. (Incumbent)	42,423	69.6
Democratic	Michael Komondy	18,517	30.4
Republican hold			

New Jersey State Senate elections, 2011
Party	Candidate	Votes	%
Republican	Thomas Kean Jr. (Incumbent)	27,750	67.5
Democratic	Paul Swanicke	13,351	32.5
Republican hold			

New Jersey State Senate elections, 2007
Party	Candidate	Votes	%
Republican	Thomas Kean Jr. (Incumbent)	29,795	59.7
Democratic	Gina Genovese	20,092	40.3
Republican hold			

New Jersey general election, 2003
Party	Candidate	Votes	%	±%
Republican	Thomas Kean Jr. (Incumbent)	32,058	67.4	▲8.8
Democratic	Francis D. McIntyre	14,470	30.4	▼11.0
Green	Teresa Migliore-DiMatteo	1,055	2.2	N/A
Total votes		47,583	100.0	

=== New Jersey Assembly ===
New Jersey general election, 2001
Party	Candidate	Votes	%
Republican	Thomas Kean Jr.	44,223	31.8
Republican	Eric Munoz	39,457	28.4
Democratic	Tom Jardim	28,499	20.5
Democratic	J. Brooke Hern	26,896	19.3
Total votes		139,075	100.0

=== United States Senate ===
United States Senate election in New Jersey, 2006
Party	Candidate	Votes	%	±%
Democratic	Bob Menendez (inc.)	1,200,843	53.3%	+3.1%
Republican	Thomas Kean Jr.	997,775	44.3%	−2.8%
Libertarian	Len Flynn	14,637	0.7%	+0.4%
Marijuana	Edward Forchion	11,593	0.5%	
Independent	J.M. Carter	7,918	0.4	+0.2
Independent	N. Leonard Smith	6,243	0.3%	
Independent	Daryl Brooks	5,138	0.2%	
Socialist Workers	Angela Lariscy	3,433	0.2%	+0.1%
Socialist	Gregory Pason	2,490	0.1%	+0.0%
Majority		203,068	9.0%	
Turnout		2,250,070		
Democratic hold		Swing	3.26%	

New Jersey Senate
Preceded by Leonard Lance	Minority Leader of the New Jersey Senate; 2008–2022	Succeeded by Steve Oroho
Party political offices
Preceded by Bob Franks	Republican nominee for U.S. Senator from New Jersey (Class 1); 2006	Succeeded by Joe Kyrillos
U.S. House of Representatives
Preceded by Tom Malinowski	Member of the U.S. House of Representatives from New Jersey's 7th congressional district 2023–present	Incumbent
U.S. order of precedence (ceremonial)
Preceded by Sydney Kamlager-Dove	United States representatives by seniority 321st	Succeeded by Jen Kiggans
