= Jon Bramnick =

Member of the New Jersey Senate

Member of the New Jersey Senate from the 21st district
- Incumbent
- Assumed office January 11, 2022
- Preceded by: Thomas Kean Jr.

Minority Leader of the New Jersey General Assembly
- In office January 10, 2012 – January 11, 2022
- Preceded by: Alex DeCroce
- Succeeded by: John DiMaio

Member of the New Jersey General Assembly from the 21st district
- In office February 24, 2003 – January 11, 2022 Serving with Eric Munoz (2003–2009); Nancy Munoz (2009–2022)
- Preceded by: Thomas Kean Jr.
- Succeeded by: Michele Matsikoudis

Personal details
- Born: February 24, 1953 (age 73) Plainfield, New Jersey, U.S.
- Party: Republican
- Spouse: Patricia Brentano (m. 1981)
- Children: 2
- Education: Syracuse University (BA); Hofstra University (JD)
- Website: Official website State Senate website

Jon M. Bramnick (born February 24, 1953) is an American Republican Party politician who has served in the New Jersey Senate since 2022, representing the 21st legislative district. He previously served in the New Jersey General Assembly, representing the 21st Legislative District from 2003 to 2022, where he was the Assembly Republican Leader from January 2012 to January 2022. He was appointed to the Assembly in 2003 to fill the unexpired term of the vacancy created upon the selection of Thomas Kean Jr. to fill an unexpired New Jersey Senate term. He was elected to a full two-year term later that year and was re-elected in 2005, 2007, 2009, 2011, 2013, 2015, 2017, and 2019. He was elected to the New Jersey Senate in 2021 and was re-elected in 2023.

In January 2024, Bramnick announced he was running for Governor of New Jersey in 2025, but lost in the primary with 6.2% of the vote. Bramnick is a moderate, anti-Donald Trump Republican.

== Early life ==
Bramnick was born and raised in Plainfield, New Jersey, to his father Herbert X. Bramnick, and his wife, Babette. His parents ran Lazaar's Stationers, a stationery supply business in Plainfield. He graduated from Plainfield High School, received a B.A. in political science from the Maxwell School of Citizenship and Public Affairs at Syracuse University and was awarded a J.D. from the Hofstra University School of Law.

Before becoming an Assemblyman, Bramnick served two terms on the Plainfield City Council from 1984 to 1991 for the second ward. In 1998, Bramnick ran for the Westfield City Council for the first ward. He won the primary, however he lost the general election. He is the Republican Municipal Chairman in Westfield, where he resides with his family. Bramnick is a former professor at both Rutgers University and Rider University. Following his graduation from law school, he served as an assistant corporation counsel in New York City. He is an attorney with a private practice in Scotch Plains, New Jersey with the firm of Bramnick, Rodriguez, Grabas, Arnold & Mangan.

== New Jersey Legislature ==
Following the appointment of Tom Kean Jr. to the State Senate, a vacancy opened up in the 21st District's Assembly delegation. Bramnick won the most ballots of a vote by members of the Essex, Morris, Somerset, and Union county Republican committee persons of the district beating former Assemblyman James J. Barry Jr., Millburn mayor Thomas McDermott, and Warren Township Planning Board chairman Dan Gallic. In December 2005, he was appointed Assistant Minority Whip of the Assembly for the 2006–2008 term. In June 2007, Bramnick was selected as the Minority Whip, succeeding Francis J. Blee. In November 2009, he was elected as the Republican Conference Leader, the second-highest leadership position in the Republican caucus. In the Assembly, he has served as Vice Chair of the Legislative Services Commission.

After the death of Assembly Republican Leader Alex DeCroce in January 2012, the Assembly Republican caucus chose Bramnick as its new leader. Bramnick has been honored with the 2013 Governor Meyner Award from the Bar Association and the 2011 Legislator of the Year award from the Chamber of Commerce. He was named 2013 Legislator of the Year by the New Jersey Conference of Mayors and was honored at Rider University for his dedication to New Jersey politics and public service. On January 3, 2017, Bramnick announced that he would not run for New Jersey governor in 2017, as he was seen as a potential frontrunner for the Republican gubernatorial nomination.

In 2022 Bramnick won election to the New Jersey Senate, once again succeeding Tom Kean Jr., who did not run for re-election.

=== Committee assignments ===
Committee assignments for the 2024—2025 Legislative Session are:

- Commerce
- Judiciary

=== District 21 ===
Each of the 40 districts in the New Jersey Legislature has one representative in the New Jersey Senate and two members in the New Jersey General Assembly. The representatives from the 21st District for the 2026—2027 Legislative Session are:

- Senator Jon Bramnick (R)
- Assemblyman Vincent Kearney(D)
- Assemblyman Andrew Macurdy (D)

== Gubernatorial campaign ==
In January 2024, Bramnick announced he was running for Governor of New Jersey in 2025. In the Republican primary, Bramnick placed third out of five candidates with 6.2% of the vote.

== Political positions ==
Bramnick is widely described as a moderate Republican who is opposed to Donald Trump.

=== Abortion ===
Bramnick supports abortion rights, and described himself as being in favor of Roe v. Wade. In 2022, he abstained on a vote to codify abortion into New Jersey state law, saying that the bill "went too far." In 2024, he described himself as "a pro-choice Republican."

=== Donald Trump ===
Bramnick has been critical of president Donald Trump, with a NorthJersey.com article describing him as a "Never Trumper". He has criticised Trump's attempts to overturn the 2020 election, saying "I think it is dangerous to democracy that anytime a president who says, 'I won,' and then says there is illegality and fraud, and then does not produce it". In 2022, Bramnick said that Trump's presidency "caused a problem for the Republican brand", adding that "ever since January 6, people are concerned whether or not they can trust the Republicans."

=== Drugs ===
Bramnick is an opponent of the legalization of recreational marijuana, saying he "doesn't deny" using marijuana while in college but is "not a fan" of its legalization.

=== Guns ===
Bramnick received an "A+" rating from the NRA Political Victory Fund in 2015 and 2017, though this declined to a "C" grade for 2019, 2021 and 2023. During the 2019 electoral campaign, Bramnick was accused by his opponents of being an opponent of gun control. Bramnick rejected these claims, saying he had voted for universal background checks and limiting handgun purchases, and that he supported a federal ban on assault weapons.

=== LGBT rights ===
In 2013, Governor Chris Christie vetoed a bill that would have legalized gay marriage in New Jersey. Bramnick opposed gay marriage and expressed his agreement with the governor. Bramnick described marriage equality as not being a civil rights issue, rather "something for the voters". When Christie decided not to appeal New Jersey's Supreme Court decision legalizing same-sex marriage, Bramnick said it was "a smart thing" to not appeal. In 2021, Bramnick abstained on the bill that codified marriage equality into law in New Jersey.

== Personal life ==
Bramnick holds the honorary title of "Funniest Lawyer in New Jersey" after winning contests sponsored by the bar association at Rascals Comedy Club. He often volunteers his services as a comedic auctioneer on behalf of non-profit organizations including Hurricane Sandy victims. Bramnick resides in Westfield, New Jersey with his wife Patricia (married in 1981), and has two grown children and a granddaughter. He is Jewish.

On March 11, 2019, Bramnick self-published a book titled Why People Don't Like You which is a comedy book about social skills.

== Electoral history ==
=== New Jersey Senate ===
2023 New Jersey general election
Party	Candidate	Votes	%	±%
Republican	Jon Bramnick	34,435	53.5	▼0.1
Democratic	Matt Marino	29,948	46.5	▲0.1
Total votes		64,383	100.0	

2021 New Jersey general election
Party	Candidate	Votes	%	±%
Republican	Jon Bramnick	44,254	53.6	▼1.1
Democratic	Joseph Signorello III	38,237	46.4	▲1.1
Total votes		82,491	100.0	

=== New Jersey Assembly ===
21st Legislative District General Election, 2019
Party	Candidate	Votes	%
Republican	Jon Bramnick (incumbent)	28,787	26.31%
Republican	Nancy Munoz (incumbent)	28,079	25.66%
Democratic	Lisa Mandelblatt	25,452	23.26%
Democratic	Stacey Gunderman	24,865	22.73%
Independent Conservative	Martin Marks	1,147	1.05%
Independent Conservative	Harris Pappas	1,081	0.99%
Total votes		109,411	100%
Republican hold			

New Jersey general election, 2017
Party	Candidate	Votes	%	±%
Republican	Jon Bramnick (Incumbent)	35,283	26.4	▼3.5
Republican	Nancy Munoz (Incumbent)	34,273	25.7	▼3.8
Democratic	Lacey Rzeszowski	32,719	24.5	▲3.9
Democratic	Bruce H. Bergen	31,248	23.4	▲3.4
Total votes		133,523	100.0	

New Jersey general election, 2015
Party	Candidate	Votes	%	±%
Republican	Jon Bramnick (Incumbent)	20,024	29.9	▼3.0
Republican	Nancy Munoz (Incumbent)	19,783	29.5	▼2.4
Democratic	Jill Anne LaZare	13,804	20.6	▲2.5
Democratic	David Barnett	13,378	20.0	▲2.9
Total votes		66,989	100.0	

New Jersey general election, 2013
Party	Candidate	Votes	%	±%
Republican	Jon Bramnick (Incumbent)	38,556	32.9	▲1.2
Republican	Nancy Munoz (Incumbent)	37,314	31.9	0.0
Democratic	Jill Anne LaZare	21,129	18.1	▲0.7
Democratic	Norman W. Albert	20,045	17.1	▼0.3
Total votes		117,044	100.0	

New Jersey general election, 2011
Party	Candidate	Votes	%
Republican	Nancy Munoz (Incumbent)	25,491	31.9
Republican	Jon Bramnick (Incumbent)	25,303	31.7
Democratic	Bruce H. Bergen	13,878	17.4
Democratic	Norman W. Albert	13,864	17.4
Libertarian	Darren Young	1,324	1.7
Total votes		79,860	100.0

New Jersey general election, 2009
Party	Candidate	Votes	%	±%
Republican	Nancy Munoz (Incumbent)	45,515	32.5	▲3.4
Republican	Jon Bramnick (Incumbent)	45,439	32.4	▲3.5
Democratic	Bruce Bergen	24,848	17.7	▼1.3
Democratic	Norman Albert	24,240	17.3	▼1.3
Total votes		140,042	100.0	

New Jersey general election, 2007
Party	Candidate	Votes	%	±%
Republican	Eric Munoz (Incumbent)	27,496	29.1	▼0.5
Republican	Jon Bramnick (Incumbent)	27,322	28.9	▼0.2
Democratic	Bruce Bergen	17,937	19.0	▼1.7
Democratic	Norman Albert	17,629	18.6	▼1.9
Green	George DeCarlo	1,245	1.3	N/A
Green	Ryan P. Reyes	1,180	1.2	N/A
Libertarian	Darren Young	900	1.0	N/A
Libertarian	Jeff Hetrick	850	0.9	N/A
Total votes		94,559	100.0	

New Jersey general election, 2005
Party	Candidate	Votes	%	±%
Republican	Eric Munoz (Incumbent)	40,839	29.6	▼0.3
Republican	Jon Bramnick (Incumbent)	40,123	29.1	▲0.2
Democratic	Bruce Bergen	28,595	20.7	▼0.5
Democratic	Steven Merman	28,319	20.5	▲3.1
Total votes		137,876	100.0	

New Jersey general election, 2003
Party	Candidate	Votes	%	±%
Republican	Eric Munoz (Incumbent)	27,626	29.9	▲1.5
Republican	Jon Bramnick (Incumbent)	26,714	28.9	▼2.9
Democratic	Ellen Steinberg	19,602	21.2	▲0.7
Democratic	Norman W. Albert	16,087	17.4	▼1.9
Green	George DeCarlo	1,045	1.1	N/A
Green	Ryan Reyes	987	1.1	N/A
Unemployed	Joshua Jacobs	464	0.5	N/A
Total votes		92,525	100.0	

New Jersey General Assembly
Preceded by Alex DeCroce	Minority Leader of the New Jersey General Assembly; 2012–2022	Succeeded by John DiMaio
