= Vincent Kearney (politician) =

American politician

Member of the New Jersey General Assembly from the 21st district
- Incumbent
- Assumed office January 13, 2026 Serving with Andrew Macurdy
- Preceded by: Michele Matsikoudis; Nancy Munoz

Personal details
- Born: October 12, 1976 (age 49)
- Party: Democratic
- Website: Legislative webpage

Vincent Kearney (born October 12, 1976) is an American Democratic Party politician who has represented the 21st Legislative District in the New Jersey General Assembly since taking office in January 2026. He flipped the district at the 2025 New Jersey General Assembly election. Prior to his election, he was a member of the Garwood Borough Council, flipping a Republican seat following a controversy involving bigoted social media posts.

== Early life and education ==
Raised in Union Township, Union County, New Jersey, Kearney graduated from Oratory Preparatory School. He attended the John H. Stamler Police Academy in Union County where he trained in law enforcement.

== Electoral history ==
The two Assembly seats in the 21st district, which covers parts of Middlesex, Morris, Somerset and Union counties, had been held exclusively by Republicans since the early 1990s. Democrats had targeted the seats unsuccessfully, losing by narrow margins in the four previous elections, with their efforts increasing after Kamala Harris defeated Donald Trump by a 14-point margin among district voters in the 2024 election. In 2025, Kearney and his fellow Democratic running mate Andrew Macurdy defeated Republican incumbents Michele Matsikoudis and Nancy Munoz to flip the two seats representing the 21st district. Kearney, Macurdy and Marisa Sweeney are the only Democrats representing part of Morris County in the state legislature.

== New Jersey General Assembly ==
Kearney took office on January 13, 2026.

=== Committee assignments ===
Committee assignments for the 2026—2027 Legislative Session are:

- Commerce and Economic Development
- Higher Education
- State and Local Government

=== District 21 ===
Each of the 40 districts in the New Jersey Legislature has one representative in the New Jersey Senate and two members in the New Jersey General Assembly. The representatives from the 21st District for the 2026—2027 Legislative Session are:

- Senator Jon Bramnick (R)
- Assemblyman Vincent Kearney (D)
- Assemblyman Andrew Macurdy (D)
