= Andrew Macurdy =

American politician

Member of the New Jersey General Assembly from the 21st district
- Incumbent
- Assumed office January 13, 2026 Serving with Vincent Kearney
- Preceded by: Michele Matsikoudis; Nancy Munoz

Personal details
- Party: Democratic
- Education: Swarthmore College; Harvard Law School
- Website: Legislative webpage

Andrew Macurdy is an American Democratic Party politician who has represented the 21st Legislative District in the New Jersey General Assembly since taking office in January 2026.

== Early life and education ==
Raised in Lumberton, New Jersey, Macurdy graduated in 2004 ranked first in his class at Rancocas Valley Regional High School, where he captained both the soccer and spring track teams.

He graduated from Swarthmore College and Harvard Law School.

== Election history ==
A resident of Summit, New Jersey, he and running mate Vincent Kearney flipped the district at the 2025 New Jersey General Assembly election, knocking off Republican incumbents Michele Matsikoudis and Nancy Munoz. Prior to his election, he worked as a prosecutor. Zach Blackburn of New Jersey Globe noted that Macurdy was an ally of Senator Andy Kim. Kearney, Macurdy and Marisa Sweeney are the only Democrats representing part of Morris County in the state legislature.

== New Jersey General Assembly ==
Macurdy took office on January 13, 2026.

=== Committee assignments ===
Committee assignments for the 2026—2027 Legislative Session are:

- Science, Innovation and Technology
- Transportation and Independent Authorities

=== District 21 ===
Each of the 40 districts in the New Jersey Legislature has one representative in the New Jersey Senate and two members in the New Jersey General Assembly. The representatives from the 21st District for the 2026—2027 Legislative Session are:

- Senator Jon Bramnick (R)
- Assemblyman Vincent Kearney (D)
- Assemblyman Andrew Macurdy (D)
