= Nancy Muñoz =

Member of the New Jersey General Assembly

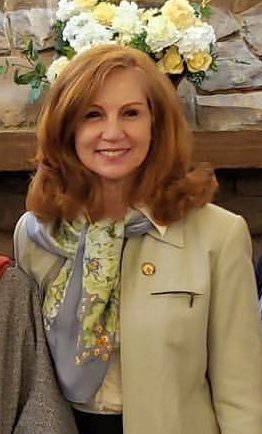

Member of the New Jersey General Assembly from the 21st district
- In office May 21, 2009 – January 13, 2026 Serving with Jon Bramnick (2009–2022); Michele Matsikoudis (2022–2026)
- Preceded by: Eric Muñoz
- Succeeded by: Vincent Kearney; Andrew Macurdy

Personal details
- Born: Nancy Ann Foster; September 8, 1954 (age 71)
- Party: Republican
- Spouse: Eric Muñoz (1984–2009)
- Children: 5
- Education: Skidmore College (BS); Hunter College (MS)
- Website: Legislative website

Nancy Ann Foster Muñoz (born September 8, 1954) is an American Republican Party politician who served in the New Jersey General Assembly from 2009 to 2026, where she represented the 21st Legislative District. She was appointed minority whip on July 18, 2017, and co-chair of the Republican Conference, alongside John DiMaio, on January 14, 2020. She lost re-election in 2025.

Muñoz served in the General Assembly as the Deputy Minority Leader and Republican Budget Officer.

== Early life ==
Nancy Ann Foster was born on September 8, 1954, the daughter of Freda and James E. Foster and graduated from Mark T. Sheehan High School in Wallingford, Connecticut. She holds a B.S. and a M.S. (both in nursing) from Skidmore College and Hunter College, respectively. She has worked as a nurse in Massachusetts General Hospital, the Memorial Sloan Kettering Cancer Center, and Overlook Medical Center (in her hometown of Summit), and has worked as a risk care manager for Continental Insurance Health Care. Muñoz is a resident of Summit. In 1984, she married Eric Muñoz in Freehold Borough, with whom she has five children.

== New Jersey Assembly ==
Muñoz's husband, a New Jersey General Assemblyman, died at the age of 61 from complications from a ruptured aortic aneurysm on March 30, 2009. In April 2009, Nancy Muñoz received the backing of the Union County Republican Party in her efforts to take over her late husband's seat in the legislature. Long Hill Township Mayor George Vitureira and Long Hill School Board member Bruce Meringolo also sought the seat; Vitureira was backed by Morris County GOP chairman John Sette. The Republican Party held a special convention in Mountainside on April 27 to determine who would take over the seat; Muñoz won with 174 votes, while Meringolo received 34 votes and Vitureira received 16. She was sworn into the legislature on May 21; she was assigned to serve on the Health and Senior Services Committee and the Human Services Committee, taking committee seats previously held by her husband. Muñoz took her first steps towards being elected in her own right on June 2, 2009, when she defeated Meringolo and Vitureira in the Republican primary; she won the 2009 general election and full terms in each subsequent general election until 2025.

=== Committee assignments ===
Committee assignments for the 2024—2025 Legislative Session are:

- Budget
- Health

=== District 21 ===
Each of the 40 districts in the New Jersey Legislature has one representative in the New Jersey Senate and two members in the New Jersey General Assembly. The representatives from the 21st District for the 2024—2025 Legislative Session were:

- Senator Jon Bramnick (R)
- Assemblywoman Michele Matsikoudis (R)
- Assemblywoman Nancy Muñoz (R)

== Electoral history ==
=== New Jersey Assembly ===
21st legislative district general election, 2025
Party	Candidate	Votes	%
Democratic	Andrew Macurdy	54,965	27.3%
Democratic	Vincent Kearney	53,881	26.7%
Republican	Michele Matsikoudis (incumbent)	46,385	23.0%
Republican	Nancy Muñoz (incumbent)	46,367	23.0%
Total votes		201,598	100.0%
Democratic gain from Republican			
Democratic gain from Republican			

21st Legislative District General Election, 2023
Party	Candidate	Votes	%
Republican	Nancy Muñoz (incumbent)	33,146	26.1
Republican	Michele Matsikoudis (incumbent)	32,607	25.7
Democratic	Elizabeth A. Graner	30,643	24.1
Democratic	Chris Weber	30,615	24.1
Total votes		127,011	100.0
Republican hold			
Republican hold			

21st legislative district general election, 2021
Party	Candidate	Votes	%
Republican	Nancy Muñoz (incumbent)	43,708	26.99%
Republican	Michele Matsikoudis	42,557	26.28%
Democratic	Elizabeth A. Graner	38,207	23.60%
Democratic	Anjali Mehrotra	37,449	23.13%
Total votes		161,921	100.0
Republican hold			

21st Legislative District General Election, 2019
Party	Candidate	Votes	%
Republican	Jon Bramnick (incumbent)	28,787	26.31%
Republican	Nancy Muñoz (incumbent)	28,079	25.66%
Democratic	Lisa Mandelblatt	25,452	23.26%
Democratic	Stacey Gunderman	24,865	22.73%
Conservative	Martin Marks	1,147	1.05%
Conservative	Harris Pappas	1,081	0.99%
Total votes		109,411	100%
Republican hold			

New Jersey general election, 2017
Party	Candidate	Votes	%	±%
Republican	Jon Bramnick (Incumbent)	35,283	26.4	▼3.5
Republican	Nancy Muñoz (Incumbent)	34,273	25.7	▼3.8
Democratic	Lacey Rzeszowski	32,719	24.5	▲3.9
Democratic	Bruce H. Bergen	31,248	23.4	▲3.4
Total votes		133,523	100.0	

New Jersey general election, 2015
Party	Candidate	Votes	%	±%
Republican	Jon Bramnick (Incumbent)	20,024	29.9	▼3.0
Republican	Nancy Muñoz (Incumbent)	19,783	29.5	▼2.4
Democratic	Jill Anne LaZare	13,804	20.6	▲2.5
Democratic	David Barnett	13,378	20.0	▲2.9
Total votes		66,989	100.0	

New Jersey general election, 2013
Party	Candidate	Votes	%	±%
Republican	Jon Bramnick (Incumbent)	38,556	32.9	▲1.2
Republican	Nancy Muñoz (Incumbent)	37,314	31.9	0.0
Democratic	Jill Anne LaZare	21,129	18.1	▲0.7
Democratic	Norman W. Albert	20,045	17.1	▼0.3
Total votes		117,044	100.0	

New Jersey general election, 2011
Party	Candidate	Votes	%
Republican	Nancy Muñoz (Incumbent)	25,491	31.9
Republican	Jon Bramnick (Incumbent)	25,303	31.7
Democratic	Bruce H. Bergen	13,878	17.4
Democratic	Norman W. Albert	13,864	17.4
Libertarian	Darren Young	1,324	1.7
Total votes		79,860	100.0

New Jersey general election, 2009
Party	Candidate	Votes	%	±%
Republican	Nancy Muñoz (Incumbent)	45,515	32.5	▲3.4
Republican	Jon Bramnick (Incumbent)	45,439	32.4	▲3.5
Democratic	Bruce Bergen	24,848	17.7	▼1.3
Democratic	Norman Albert	24,240	17.3	▼1.3
Total votes		140,042	100.0	

New Jersey General Assembly
Preceded by Eric Muñoz	Member of the New Jersey General Assembly from the 21st district 2009–present Served alongside: Jon Bramnick, Michele Matsikoudis	Incumbent
