= New Jersey's 21st legislative district =

American legislative district

- Senator: Jon Bramnick (R)
- Assembly members: Vincent Kearney (D); Andrew Macurdy (D)
- Registration: 33.48% Democratic; 28.88% Republican; 36.93% unaffiliated
- Demographics: 71.3% White; 3.3% Black/African American; 0.2% Native American; 11.9% Asian; 0.0% Hawaiian/Pacific Islander; 3.8% Other race; 9.4% Two or more races; 11.6% Hispanic
- Population: 224,546
- Voting-age population: 170,852
- Registered voters: 176,112

New Jersey's 21st legislative district is one of 40 in the New Jersey Legislature. The district includes the Morris County communities of Chatham Borough, Chatham Township, and Long Hill Township; the Somerset County municipalities of Bernardsville, Bernards Township, Green Brook, Far Hills, Peapack and Gladstone, Warren Township and Watchung; the Union County municipalities of Berkeley Heights, Garwood, Mountainside, New Providence, Springfield Township, Summit and Westfield; and the Middlesex County municipalities of Dunellen and Middlesex.

== Demographic characteristics ==
As of the 2020 United States census, the district had a population of 224,546, of whom 170,852 (76.1%) were of voting age. The racial makeup of the district was 160,014 (71.3%) White, 7,465 (3.3%) African American, 437 (0.2%) Native American, 26,753 (11.9%) Asian, 47 (0.0%) Pacific Islander, 8,611 (3.8%) from some other race, and 21,219 (9.4%) from two or more races. Hispanic or Latino of any race were 26,156 (11.6%) of the population.

The 21st district had 189,264 registered voters as of February 1, 2025, of whom 71,731 (37.9%) were registered as unaffiliated, 61,965 (32.7%) were registered as Democrats, 54,160 (28.6%) were registered as Republicans, and 1,408 (0.7%) were registered to other parties.

The densely populated district is one of the wealthiest in the state, with the highest equalized property value and income on a per capita basis. Standardized test schools in the district's public schools were the highest of all districts statewide, and the district placed third in the percentage of 9th graders graduating from high school. Voter registration and turnout in the 21st district is among the highest in the state.

== Political representation ==
For the 2026–2027 session, the 21st legislative district of the New Jersey Legislature is represented in the State Senate by Jon Bramnick (R, Westfield) and in the General Assembly by Vincent Kearney (D, Garwood) and Andrew Macurdy (D, Summit).

The district is located within the New Jersey's 7th, New Jersey's 10th, and New Jersey's 11th congressional districts.

== Apportionment history ==
When the 40-district legislative map was created in 1973, the 21st district was originally in eastern Union County consisting of Elizabeth, Linden, and Winfield Township plus Carteret in Middlesex County. In the 1981 redistricting, the 21st district became based out of central Union County, centered about Kenilworth and inclusive of the municipalities that border Kenilworth plus Westfield, Garwood, Roselle, and Hillside. In the next redistricting in 1991, a major change occurred to the district's boundaries: It now consisted of northern Union County from Roselle Park and Union Township, then north into the west side of Essex County from Millburn to North Caldwell and Cedar Grove.

After a single term in the Senate, Thomas G. Dunn was dropped by the Union County Democrats in 1977 and was replaced on the party line by Linden Mayor John T. Gregorio. Dunn ran as an independent and lost to Gregorio in the general election.

Edward K. Gill, elected to the Assembly in 1981 after C. Louis Bassano ran for the Senate, had announced that he would not run for a third term in the Assembly shortly before his death in February 1985. Peter J. Genova was elected in a special election to fill Gill's vacant seat.

Joel Weingarten was elected to the Assembly in a November 1996 special election in which he defeated Democratic candidate Robert R. Peacock to fill the one year remaining on the vacant seat of Monroe Jay Lustbader, who had died in office in March 1996.

Changes to the district made as part of the legislative redistricting in 2001, based on the results of the 2000 United States census removed Kenilworth and Union Township (both to the 20th legislative district) Caldwell, Essex Fells, Livingston Township, North Caldwell Township and Roseland (all to the 27th legislative district), Cedar Grove and Verona (both to the 40th legislative district) and added Berkeley Heights Township, Chatham Township, Cranford Township, Garwood, Long Hill Township, Mountainside, New Providence, Warren Township, Watchung and Westfield (from the 22nd legislative district), Harding Township (from the 25th legislative district) and Madison (from the 26th legislative district). The 2011 apportionment added Chatham Borough (from district 26), Bernards Township (from district 16), Far Hills (from district 16) and Kenilworth (from district 20). Removed were Chatham Township, Harding Township, Madison, and Millburn, all of which were shifted into the 27th legislative district.

A special convention of Republican Party delegates chose Nancy Munoz in May 2009 to succeed her husband, Eric Munoz, following his death in March of that year.

== Election history ==
Session	Senate	General Assembly	
1974–1975	Thomas G. Dunn (D)	Thomas J. Deverin (D)	John T. Gregorio (D)
1976–1977	Thomas G. Dunn (D)	Thomas J. Deverin (D)	John T. Gregorio (D)
1978–1979	John T. Gregorio (D)	Thomas J. Deverin (D)	Raymond Lesniak (D)
1980–1981	John T. Gregorio (D)	Thomas J. Deverin (D)	Raymond Lesniak (D)
1982–1983	C. Louis Bassano (R)	Edward K. Gill (R)	Chuck Hardwick (R)
1984–1985	C. Louis Bassano (R)	Edward K. Gill (R) (Note: Died February 9, 1985)	Chuck Hardwick (R)
1984–1985	C. Louis Bassano (R)	Peter J. Genova (R) (Note: Elected in March 1985 special election, sworn in on April 15, 1985)	Chuck Hardwick (R)
1986–1987	C. Louis Bassano (R)	Peter J. Genova (R)	Chuck Hardwick (R)
1988–1989	C. Louis Bassano (R)	Peter J. Genova (R)	Chuck Hardwick (R)
1990–1991	C. Louis Bassano (R)	Neil M. Cohen (D)	Chuck Hardwick (R)
1992–1993	C. Louis Bassano (R)	Monroe Jay Lustbader (R)	Maureen Ogden (R)
1994–1995	C. Louis Bassano (R)	Monroe Jay Lustbader (R)	Maureen Ogden (R)
1996–1997	C. Louis Bassano (R)	Monroe Jay Lustbader (R) (Note: Died March 16, 1996)	Kevin J. O'Toole (R)
1996–1997	C. Louis Bassano (R)	Joel Weingarten (R) (Note: Appointed to the Assembly on May 2, 1996, elected to complete unexpired term in November 1996 special election)	Kevin J. O'Toole (R)
1998–1999	C. Louis Bassano (R) (Note: Resigned April 16, 2001 to join staff of the Sports and Exposition Authority)	Joel Weingarten (R)	Kevin J. O'Toole (R)
2000–2001	C. Louis Bassano (R)	Joel Weingarten (R)	Kevin J. O'Toole (R) (Note: Appointed to the Senate on May 5, 2001)
2000–2001	Kevin J. O'Toole (R)	Joel Weingarten (R)	Eric Munoz (R) (Note: Appointed to the Assembly on May 10, 2001)
2002–2003	Richard Bagger (R) (Note: Resigned January 15, 2003)	Thomas Kean Jr. (R) (Note: Appointed to the Senate on March 1, 2003)	Eric Munoz (R)
2002–2003	Thomas Kean Jr. (R)	Jon Bramnick (R) (Note: Appointed to the Assembly on February 24, 2003)	Eric Munoz (R)
2004–2005	Thomas Kean Jr. (R)	Jon Bramnick (R)	Eric Munoz (R)
2006–2007	Thomas Kean Jr. (R)	Jon Bramnick (R)	Eric Munoz (R)
2008–2009	Thomas Kean Jr. (R)	Jon Bramnick (R)	Eric Munoz (R) (Note: Died March 30, 2009)
2008–2009	Thomas Kean Jr. (R)	Jon Bramnick (R)	Nancy Munoz (R) (Note: Appointed to the Assembly on May 21, 2009)
2010–2011	Thomas Kean Jr. (R)	Jon Bramnick (R)	Nancy Munoz (R)
2012–2013	Thomas Kean Jr. (R)	Jon Bramnick (R)	Nancy Munoz (R)
2014–2015	Thomas Kean Jr. (R)	Jon Bramnick (R)	Nancy Munoz (R)
2016–2017	Thomas Kean Jr. (R)	Jon Bramnick (R)	Nancy Munoz (R)
2018–2019	Thomas Kean Jr. (R)	Jon Bramnick (R)	Nancy Munoz (R)
2020–2021	Thomas Kean Jr. (R)	Jon Bramnick (R)	Nancy Munoz (R)
2022–2023	Jon Bramnick (R)	Michele Matsikoudis (R)	Nancy Munoz (R)
2024–2025	Jon Bramnick (R)	Michele Matsikoudis (R)	Nancy Munoz (R)
2026–2027	Jon Bramnick (R)	Vincent Kearney (D)	Andrew Macurdy (D)

== Election results ==
=== Senate ===
2023 New Jersey general election
Party	Candidate	Votes	%	±%
Republican	Jon Bramnick	34,435	53.5	▼.1
Democratic	Matt Marino	29,948	46.5	▲.1
Total votes		64,383	100.0	

2021 New Jersey general election
Party	Candidate	Votes	%	±%
Republican	Jon Bramnick	44,254	53.6	▼1.1
Democratic	Joseph Signorello III	38,237	46.4	▲1.1
Total votes		82,491	100.0	

New Jersey general election, 2017
Party	Candidate	Votes	%	±%
Republican	Thomas H. Kean Jr.	37,579	54.7	▼14.9
Democratic	Jill LaZare	31,123	45.3	▲14.9
Total votes		68,702	100.0	

New Jersey general election, 2013
Party	Candidate	Votes	%	±%
Republican	Thomas H. Kean Jr.	42,423	69.6	▲2.1
Democratic	Michael Komondy	18,517	30.4	▼2.1
Total votes		60,940	100.0	

2011 New Jersey general election
Party	Candidate	Votes	%
Republican	Thomas H. Kean, Jr.	27,750	67.5
Democratic	Paul Swanicke	13,351	32.5
Total votes		41,101	100.0

2007 New Jersey general election
Party	Candidate	Votes	%	±%
Republican	Thomas H. Kean Jr	29,795	59.7	▼7.7
Democratic	Gina Genovese	20,092	40.3	▲9.9
Total votes		49,887	100.0	

2003 New Jersey general election
Party	Candidate	Votes	%	±%
Republican	Thomas H. Kean Jr	32,058	67.4	▲8.8
Democratic	Francis D. McIntyre	14,470	30.4	▼11.0
Green	Teresa Migliore-DiMatteo	1,055	2.2	N/A
Total votes		47,583	100.0	

2001 New Jersey general election
Party	Candidate	Votes	%
Republican	Richard H. Bagger	41,539	58.6
Democratic	Ellen Steinberg	29,342	41.4
Total votes		70,881	100.0

1997 New Jersey general election
Party	Candidate	Votes	%	±%
Republican	C. Louis Bassano	43,997	100.0	▲35.7
Total votes		43,997	100.0	

1993 New Jersey general election
Party	Candidate	Votes	%	±%
Republican	C. Louis Bassano	45,589	64.3	▼7.3
Democratic	Cathie Perselay Seidman	24,267	34.2	▲5.8
Public Servant/Leader	Linda S. Dye	1,036	1.5	N/A
Total votes		70,892	100.0	

1991 New Jersey general election
Party	Candidate	Votes	%
Republican	C. Louis Bassano	38,591	71.6
Democratic	Elly Manov	15,311	28.4
Total votes		53,902	100.0

1987 New Jersey general election
Party	Candidate	Votes	%	±%
Republican	C. Louis Bassano	28,663	53.8	▲3.3
Democratic	Anthony E. Russo	24,656	46.2	▼3.3
Total votes		53,319	100.0	

1983 New Jersey general election
Party	Candidate	Votes	%	±%
Republican	C. Louis Bassano	29,300	50.5	▼1.4
Democratic	Anthony E. Russo	28,734	49.5	▲1.4
Total votes		58,034	100.0	

1981 New Jersey general election
Party	Candidate	Votes	%
Republican	C. Louis Bassano	36,957	51.9
Democratic	Anthony E. Russo	34,252	48.1
Total votes		71,209	100.0

1977 New Jersey general election
Party	Candidate	Votes	%	±%
Democratic	John T. Gregorio	20,255	46.9	▼15.8
Re-elect Experience, Courage	Thomas G. Dunn	13,932	32.2	▼30.5
Republican	Robert T. Walsh	8,005	18.5	▼16.0
Repeal Income Tax	Rocco J. Gallo	1,023	2.4	N/A
Total votes		43,215	100.0	

1973 New Jersey general election
Party	Candidate	Votes	%
Democratic	Thomas G. Dunn	26,138	62.7
Republican	William G. Palermo, Jr.	14,396	34.5
Independent	Anthony Carbone	1,137	2.7
Total votes		41,671	100.0

=== General Assembly ===
2025 New Jersey general election
Party	Candidate	Votes	%	±%
Democratic	Andrew Macurdy	54,965	27.0	▲3.2
Democratic	Vincent Kearney	53,881	26.7	▲2.6
Republican	Michele Matsikoudis	46,385	23.0	▼2.7
Republican	Nancy Muñoz	46,367	23.0	▼3.1
Total votes		201,598	100.0	

2023 New Jersey general election
Party	Candidate	Votes	%	±%
Republican	Nancy Muñoz	33,146	27.0	▼0.9
Republican	Michele Matsikoudis	32,607	26.3	▼0.6
Democratic	Elizabeth Graner	30,643	24.1	▲0.5
Democratic	Chris Weber	37,449	24.1	▲1.0
Total votes		127,011	100.0	

2021 New Jersey general election
Party	Candidate	Votes	%	±%
Republican	Nancy Muñoz	43,708	27.0	▲1.6
Republican	Michele Matsikoudis	42,557	26.3	▲0.3
Democratic	Elizabeth A. Graner	38,207	23.6	0.0
Democratic	Anjali Mehrotra	37,449	23.1	▲0.1
Total votes		161,921	100.0	

2019 New Jersey general election
Party	Candidate	Votes	%	±%
Republican	Jon Bramnick	29,949	26.0	▼0.4
Republican	Nancy Munoz	29,197	25.4	▼0.3
Democratic	Lisa Mandelblatt	27,143	23.6	▼0.9
Democratic	Stacey Gunderman	26,518	23.0	▼0.4
Independent Conservative	Martin Marks	1,196	1.0	N/A
Independent Conservative	Harris P. Pappas	1,130	1.0	N/A
Total votes		115,133	100.0	

New Jersey general election, 2017
Party	Candidate	Votes	%	±%
Republican	Jon Bramnick	35,283	26.4	▼3.5
Republican	Nancy F. Munoz	34,273	25.7	▼3.8
Democratic	Lacey Rzeszowski	32,719	24.5	▲3.9
Democratic	Bruce H. Bergen	31,248	23.4	▲3.4
Total votes		133,523	100.0	

New Jersey general election, 2015
Party	Candidate	Votes	%	±%
Republican	Jon Bramnick	20,024	29.9	▼3.0
Republican	Nancy Muñoz	19,783	29.5	▼2.4
Democratic	Jill Anne LaZare	13,804	20.6	▲2.5
Democratic	David Barnett	13,378	20.0	▲2.9
Total votes		66,989	100.0	

New Jersey general election, 2013
Party	Candidate	Votes	%	±%
Republican	Jon Bramnick	38,556	32.9	▲1.2
Republican	Nancy Munoz	37,314	31.9	0.0
Democratic	Jill Anne LaZare	21,129	18.1	▲0.7
Democratic	Norman W. Albert	20,045	17.1	▼0.3
Total votes		117,044	100.0	

New Jersey general election, 2011
Party	Candidate	Votes	%
Republican	Nancy F. Munoz	25,491	31.9
Republican	Jon Bramnick	25,303	31.7
Democratic	Bruce H. Bergen	13,878	17.4
Democratic	Norman W. Albert	13,864	17.4
Libertarian	Darren Young	1,324	1.7
Total votes		79,860	100.0

New Jersey general election, 2009
Party	Candidate	Votes	%	±%
Republican	Nancy F. Munoz	45,515	32.5	▲3.4
Republican	Jon Bramnick	45,439	32.4	▲3.5
Democratic	Bruce Bergen	24,848	17.7	▼1.3
Democratic	Norman Albert	24,240	17.3	▼1.3
Total votes		140,042	100.0	

New Jersey general election, 2007
Party	Candidate	Votes	%	±%
Republican	Eric Munoz	27,496	29.1	▼0.5
Republican	Jon M. Bramnick	27,322	28.9	▼0.2
Democratic	Bruce Bergen	17,937	19.0	▼1.7
Democratic	Norman Albert	17,629	18.6	▼1.9
Green	George DeCarlo	1,245	1.3	N/A
Green	Ryan P. Reyes	1,180	1.2	N/A
Libertarian	Darren Young	900	1.0	N/A
Libertarian	Jeff Hetrick	850	0.9	N/A
Total votes		94,559	100.0	

New Jersey general election, 2005
Party	Candidate	Votes	%	±%
Republican	Eric Munoz	40,839	29.6	▼0.3
Republican	Jon Bramnick	40,123	29.1	▲0.2
Democratic	Bruce Bergen	28,595	20.7	▼0.5
Democratic	Steven Merman	28,319	20.5	▲3.1
Total votes		137,876	100.0	

New Jersey general election, 2003
Party	Candidate	Votes	%	±%
Republican	Eric Munoz	27,626	29.9	▲1.5
Republican	Jon Bramnick	26,714	28.9	▼2.9
Democratic	Ellen Steinberg	19,602	21.2	▲0.7
Democratic	Norman W. Albert	16,087	17.4	▼1.9
Green	George DeCarlo	1,045	1.1	N/A
Green	Ryan Reyes	987	1.1	N/A
Unemployed	Joshua Jacobs	464	0.5	N/A
Total votes		92,525	100.0	

New Jersey general election, 2001
Party	Candidate	Votes	%
Republican	Thomas H. Kean, Jr.	44,223	31.8
Republican	Eric Munoz	39,457	28.4
Democratic	Tom Jardim	28,499	20.5
Democratic	J. Brooke Hern	26,896	19.3
Total votes		139,075	100.0

New Jersey general election, 1999
Party	Candidate	Votes	%	±%
Republican	Kevin J. O'Toole	17,541	28.9	▼2.4
Republican	Joel M. Weingarten	17,107	28.2	▼2.9
Democratic	Michael P. Cohan	12,836	21.2	▲2.9
Democratic	Dennis M. Caufield	12,657	20.9	▲3.3
Unbossed	Robert Diamond	533	0.9	N/A
Total votes		60,674	100.0	

New Jersey general election, 1997
Party	Candidate	Votes	%	±%
Republican	Kevin O’Toole	38,169	31.3	▲2.7
Republican	Joel M. Weingarten	37,915	31.1	▲2.5
Democratic	John M. Mazziotti	22,292	18.3	▼3.4
Democratic	John C. Shaw	21,511	17.6	▼2.0
Conservative	Alfonso J. Adinolfi	1,207	1.0	N/A
Conservative	Thomas J. Mooney	883	0.7	N/A
Total votes		121,977	100.0	

Special election, November 5, 1996
Party	Candidate	Votes	%
Republican	Joel M. Weingarten	43,869	56.5
Democratic	Robert R. Peacock	33,742	43.5
Total votes		77,611	100.0

New Jersey general election, 1995
Party	Candidate	Votes	%	±%
Republican	Kevin J. O'Toole	20,765	28.6	▼3.8
Republican	Monroe Jay Lustbader	20,713	28.6	▼2.7
Democratic	Kay Slattery	15,761	21.7	▲3.5
Democratic	Roy Allan Hirschfeld	14,208	19.6	▲1.5
Clean Government	Franklin C. Marmo	1,066	1.5	N/A
Total votes		72,513	100.0	

New Jersey general election, 1993
Party	Candidate	Votes	%	±%
Republican	Maureen Ogden	44,110	32.4	0.0
Republican	Monroe Jay Lustbader	42,599	31.3	▼0.8
Democratic	Robert A. Everett	24,842	18.2	▼1.1
Democratic	Michael N. Kurzawski	24,687	18.1	▲3.0
Total votes		136,238	100.0	

1991 New Jersey general election
Party	Candidate	Votes	%
Republican	Maureen Ogden	34,282	32.4
Republican	Monroe Jay Lustbader	33,914	32.1
Democratic	Neil M. Cohen	20,460	19.3
Democratic	Frank Covello	15,928	15.1
Populist	Bill Ciccone	1,212	1.1
Total votes		105,796	100.0

1989 New Jersey general election
Party	Candidate	Votes	%	±%
Republican	Chuck Hardwick	30,795	26.3	▼4.0
Democratic	Neil M. Cohen	30,622	26.2	▲7.1
Democratic	Brian W. Fahey	28,608	24.4	▲1.8
Republican	Ronald J. Frigerio	27,035	23.1	▼4.9
Total votes		117,060	100.0	

1987 New Jersey general election
Party	Candidate	Votes	%	±%
Republican	Chuck Hardwick	30,607	30.3	▼2.6
Republican	Peter Genova	28,317	28.0	▼3.2
Democratic	Brian W. Fahey	22,871	22.6	▲4.1
Democratic	Robert Blitz	19,297	19.1	▲2.5
Total votes		101,092	100.0	

1985 New Jersey general election
Party	Candidate	Votes	%	±%
Republican	Chuck Hardwick	36,474	32.9	▲5.9
Republican	Peter J. Genova	34,625	31.2	▲5.2
Democratic	Andrew K. Ruotolo, Jr.	20,526	18.5	▼5.3
Democratic	Livio Mancino	18,408	16.6	▼6.6
Independent	Fred Palensar III	818	0.7	N/A
Total votes		110,851	100.0	

Special election, March 26, 1985
Party	Candidate	Votes	%
Republican	Peter J. Genova	7,282	61.9
Democratic	Michael F. Alper	4,481	38.1
Total votes		11,763	100.0

New Jersey general election, 1983
Party	Candidate	Votes	%	±%
Republican	Chuck Hardwick	29,887	27.0	▼2.3
Republican	Edward K. Gill	28,833	26.0	▼1.1
Democratic	Barbara Brande	26,324	23.8	▲1.8
Democratic	Eugene J. Carmody	25,750	23.2	▲1.5
Total votes		110,794	100.0	

New Jersey general election, 1981
Party	Candidate	Votes	%
Republican	Chuck Hardwick	39,789	29.3
Republican	Edward K. Gill	36,734	27.1
Democratic	Edward Jonathan Bell	29,848	22.0
Democratic	John D. Mollozzi	29,428	21.7
Total votes		135,799	100.0

New Jersey general election, 1979
Party	Candidate	Votes	%	±%
Democratic	Raymond Lesniak	21,776	37.2	▲0.9
Democratic	Thomas J. Deverin	21,420	36.6	▲0.4
Republican	Edward G. Moley	8,007	13.7	▲0.1
Republican	Frank D. Mazzeo	7,353	12.6	▼1.3
Total votes		58,556	100.0	

New Jersey general election, 1977
Party	Candidate	Votes	%	±%
Democratic	Raymond Lesniak	27,236	36.3	▲3.0
Democratic	Thomas J. Deverin	27,133	36.2	▲0.5
Republican	Frank D. Mazzeo	10,414	13.9	▼1.8
Republican	Mitchell R. Dentley	10,186	13.6	▲0.1
Total votes		74,969	100.0	

New Jersey general election, 1975
Party	Candidate	Votes	%	±%
Democratic	Thomas J. Deverin	24,487	35.7	▼0.5
Democratic	John T. Gregorio	22,833	33.3	▼3.1
Republican	Beatrice E. Bernzott	10,771	15.7	▲2.1
Republican	Manuel Fernandez	9,266	13.5	▲1.2
U.S. Labor	Vincent Miskell	1,226	1.8	N/A
Total votes		68,583	100.0	

New Jersey general election, 1973
Party	Candidate	Votes	%
Democratic	John T. Gregorio	29,487	36.4
Democratic	Thomas J. Deverin	29,339	36.2
Republican	Raymond E. Brooks	11,063	13.6
Republican	Mitchell R. Dentley	9,937	12.3
American	Robert J. Cantrell	779	1.0
American	Jose Soler	445	0.5
Total votes		81,050	100.0
