= Ellen Park =

Member of the New Jersey General Assembly

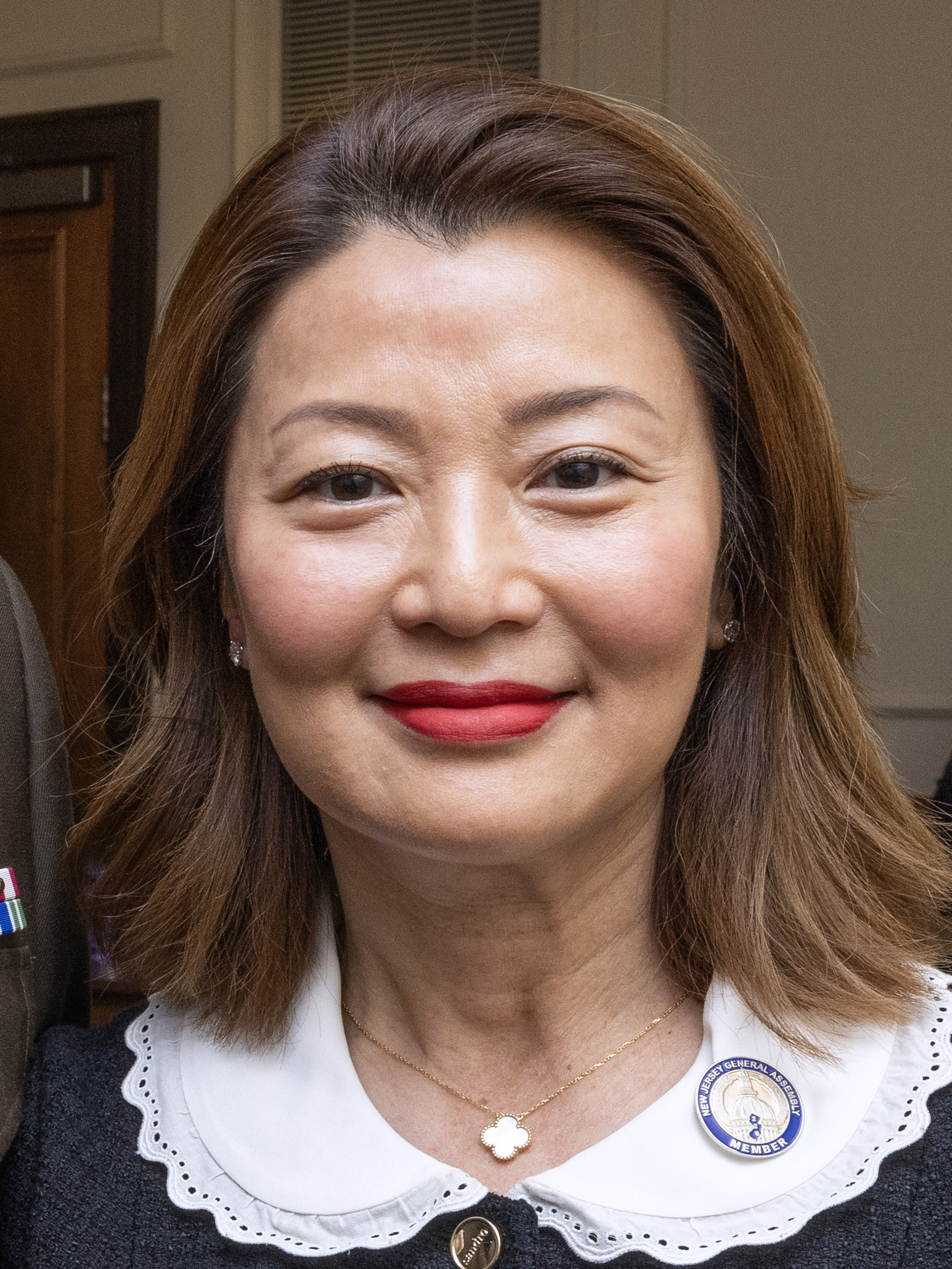
- Park in 2025

Member of the New Jersey General Assembly from the 37th district
- Incumbent
- Assumed office January 11, 2022 Serving with Shama Haider
- Preceded by: Valerie Huttle and Gordon M. Johnson

Personal details
- Born: March 6, 1972 (age 53) South Korea
- Party: Democratic
- Spouse: Richard Ma
- Website: Legislative webpage

Ellen J. Park (born March 6, 1972) is an American lawyer and Democratic Party politician who was elected in the 2021 New Jersey General Assembly election as an assemblywoman for New Jersey's 37th legislative district, making her the first Korean American woman to be elected to the New Jersey Legislature.

== Political career ==
Born in South Korea, Park moved to the United States as a child and was raised in the New York City neighborhoods of Sunnyside and Flushing. She attended Bronx High School of Science and New York University. She earned a Juris Doctor degree from the Hofstra University Maurice A. Deane School of Law. She was elected in 2016 to serve on the Englewood Cliffs, New Jersey Borough Council. In the November 2021 general election, she was elected together with her running mates, making her the first Korean woman to serve in the state legislature.

Since 2024, Park has served in the Assembly as Parliamentarian.

In 2024, Park was one of the 14 Democratic Party electors who cast the states 14 electoral votes for Kamala Harris for President and Tim Walz for Vice President.

=== Committees ===
Committee assignments for the 2024—2025 Legislative Session are:

- Judiciary (as chair)
- Budget
- Commerce, Economic Development and Agriculture

=== District 37 ===
Each of the 40 districts in the New Jersey Legislature has one representative in the New Jersey Senate and two members in the New Jersey General Assembly. The representatives from the 37th District for the 2024—2025 Legislative Session are:

- Senator Gordon M. Johnson (D)
- Assemblywoman Shama Haider (D)
- Assemblywoman Ellen Park (D)

== Electoral history ==
37th Legislative District General Election, 2023
Party	Candidate	Votes	%
Democratic	Ellen J. Park (incumbent)	26,942	36.4
Democratic	Shama A. Haider (incumbent)	25,943	35.0
Republican	Robert Bedoya	10,673	14.4
Republican	Katherine Lebovics	10,526	14.2
Total votes		74,084	100.0
Democratic hold			
Democratic hold			

37th legislative district general election, 2021
Party	Candidate	Votes	%
Democratic	Ellen J. Park	33,532	33.77%
Democratic	Shama A. Haider	32,797	33.03%
Republican	Edward P. Durfee Jr.	16,193	16.31%
Republican	Perley V. Patrick	15,863	15.97%
Children&Seniors First	Natacha M. Pannell	923	0.93%
Total votes		99,308	100.0
Democratic hold			
