= Michele Matsikoudis =

Member of the New Jersey General Assembly

Member of the New Jersey General Assembly from the 21st district
- In office January 11, 2022 – January 13, 2026
- Preceded by: Jon Bramnick
- Succeeded by: Vincent Kearney; Andrew Macurdy

Personal details
- Party: Republican
- Website: Legislative webpage

Michele Matsikoudis is an American Republican Party politician who represented the 21st legislative district in the New Jersey General Assembly from 2022 to 2026. She previously served on the New Providence Borough Council. She lost her re-election bid in 2025.

== New Jersey General Assembly ==
Matsikoudis was one of a record seven new Republican Assemblywomen elected in the 2021 general election, joining seven Republican women incumbents who won re-election that year to the Assembly and Senate.

=== Committee assignments ===
Committee assignments for the 2024—2025 Legislative Session are:

- Commerce, Economic Development and Agriculture
- Education
- Higher Education

=== District 21 ===
Each of the 40 districts in the New Jersey Legislature has one representative in the New Jersey Senate and two members in the New Jersey General Assembly. The representatives from the 21st District for the 2024—2025 Legislative Session are:

- Senator Jon Bramnick (R)
- Assemblywoman Michele Matsikoudis (R)
- Assemblywoman Nancy Munoz (R)

== Electoral history ==
21st Legislative District General Election, 2023
Party	Candidate	Votes	%
Republican	Nancy Muñoz (incumbent)	33,146	26.1
Republican	Michele Matsikoudis (incumbent)	32,607	25.7
Democratic	Elizabeth A. Graner	30,643	24.1
Democratic	Chris Weber	30,615	24.1
Total votes		127,011	100.0
Republican hold			
Republican hold			

21st legislative district general election, 2021
Party	Candidate	Votes	%
Republican	Nancy Muñoz (incumbent)	43,708	26.99%
Republican	Michele Matsikoudis	42,557	26.28%
Democratic	Elizabeth A. Graner	38,207	23.60%
Democratic	Anjali Mehrotra	37,449	23.13%
Total votes		161,921	100.0
Republican hold			
