= Donald Lan =

American politician (1930–2019)

New Jersey Secretary of State
- In office 1977 – January 1982
- Governor: Brendan Byrne
- Preceded by: George W. Lee
- Succeeded by: Jane Burgio

Member of the Democratic National Committee from New Jersey
- In office 1974–1976

Personal details
- Born: December 19, 1930 Newark, New Jersey, U.S.
- Died: April 29, 2019 (aged 88) Boca Raton, Florida, U.S.

Donald Paul Lan Sr. (December 19, 1930 – April 29, 2019) was an American Democratic Party politician who served as Secretary of State of New Jersey from 1977 to 1982 in the cabinet of Brendan Byrne. He was a member of the Democratic Party committee at the local, county, state, and national level. In 1981, he was an unsuccessful candidate for Governor of New Jersey.

== Background ==
Donald Paul Lan was born on December 19, 1930 in Newark, New Jersey and was raised in nearby Maplewood. He graduated from Columbia High School.

He attended Seton Hall University and served in the United States Air Force.

Lan worked at his family's food processing company, Dell Products, in Hillside, New Jersey. He later sold the company in 1988.

== Political career ==
Lan entered local politics in Springfield Township in the 1960s, serving as a member and executive director of the Union County Democratic Party committee and chair of the Springfield Democratic municipal organization. In 1970, Lan challenged Union County Democratic Party chairman Charles Valvano, but he lost by seventeen votes at a contentious meeting.

In 1971, Lan was the Democratic candidate for New Jersey General Assembly in the newly drawn District 9B. Lan and his running mate, incumbent Henry Gavan, were defeated by the Republican candidates, C. Louis Bassano and incumbent Herbert Kiehn.

=== Byrne administration ===
In 1973, Lan was elected to the New Jersey Democratic State Committee as the committeeman for Union County, ousting incumbent Joseph Gannon and defeating New Democratic Coalition challenger Bob Weisinger. In the same year, Lan was among those Democratic Party leaders who drafted Brendan Byrne, an Essex County judge and former prosecutor, to run for governor. Lan served as Byrne's deputy campaign manager and, after Byrne won the election, his executive secretary. Though he was not initially expected to have a major role in the administration, he came to be regarded as indispensable, particularly following the indictment of Secretary Edward Crabiel shortly after the start of the term. As executive secretary, Lan was partially credited with getting the state legislature to pass legislation to publicly finance gubernatorial elections and create the office of public advocate.

Lan was also elected to represent New Jersey on the Democratic National Committee. In April 1975, he resigned as executive secretary to run for Union County chairman again. He was successful, winning 16 of 27 votes from the executive committee. However, amid a political feud between Byrne and state party chairman James P. Dugan, Lan was removed from the national committee in 1976.

After Byrne was re-elected as governor in 1977, he appointed Lan as Secretary of State. He would also serve as the governor's top political advisor and continued to serve as Union County chair.

In 1979, Lan withdrew county party support for incumbent state senator Thomas G. Dunn in favor of John T. Gregorio. Dunn, who had abstained from Lan's election as county chair, ran as an independent, but he lost. Lan also supported attorney Raymond Lesniak for Gregorio's seat in the Assembly.

=== 1981 gubernatorial campaign ===
Beginning in 1980, Lan began fundraising for a potential 1981 gubernatorial campaign. These efforts were rebuked by Governor Byrne, who favored attorney general John J. Degnan and pressured Lan to resign from the cabinet. Byrne sought to take away Lan's government vehicle and transfer control over the state arts council to the Department of Education. In early 1981, Byrne demanded that any cabinet member running for governor resign. Degnan and cabinet secretary Ann Klein complied, but Lan refused and formally announced his campaign in front of Byrne's office. At the time of his announcement, he had already raised approximately $200,000.

Lan campaigned on a reformist platform calling for the consolidation of several state departments and the direct election of a lieutenant governor to oversee the civil service. However, his campaign failed to win county organization lines or key endorsements, and he withdrew in April 1981, within six weeks of his announcement. He endorsed U.S. representative James Florio and became his deputy campaign manager. His dual roles as Secretary of State and campaign operative became controversial when the general election between Florio and Republican nominee Tom Kean proceeded to a statewide recount. Republicans demanded that Lan recuse himself; he refused. Kean won the election by 1,797 votes.

After 1981, Lan and Byrne became friends again.

== Personal life and death ==
Lan married his wife, Hannah, in 1951. They had three children.

Lan died on April 29, 2019, at the age of 88.

Political offices
| Preceded by J. Edward Crabiel | Secretary of State of New Jersey; 1977–1982 | Succeeded by Jane Burgio |
