= New Jersey's 20th legislative district =

American legislative district

- Senator: Joseph Cryan (D)
- Assembly members: Annette Quijano (D); Eduardo Rodriguez (D)
- Registration: 48.62% Democratic; 13.27% Republican; 36.83% unaffiliated
- Demographics: 23.3% White; 27.6% Black/African American; 0.9% Native American; 4.4% Asian; 0.0% Hawaiian/Pacific Islander; 26.4% Other race; 17.4% Two or more races; 47.6% Hispanic
- Population: 242,177
- Voting-age population: 186,799
- Registered voters: 133,381

New Jersey's 20th legislative district is one of 40 in the New Jersey Legislature. The district includes the Union County municipalities of Elizabeth, Kenilworth, Roselle and Union Township.

== Demographic characteristics ==
As of the 2020 United States census, the district had a population of 242,177, of whom 186,799 (77.1%) were of voting age. The racial makeup of the district was 56,517 (23.3%) White, 66,768 (27.6%) African American, 2,059 (0.9%) Native American, 10,555 (4.4%) Asian, 103 (0.0%) Pacific Islander, 63,956 (26.4%) from some other race, and 42,219 (17.4%) from two or more races. Hispanic or Latino of any race were 115,221 (47.6%) of the population.

The district had 133,381 registered voters as of December 1, 2021, of whom 42,594 (31.9%) were registered as unaffiliated, 76,023 (57.0%) were registered as Democrats, 12,479 (9.4%) were registered as Republicans, and 2,285 (1.7%) were registered to other parties.

The district has a higher-than-average percentage of residents who are foreign born (at 35.6%, the 3rd highest of all 40 districts in the state), Hispanic (5th highest of any district statewide) and African American (11th highest). The number and percentage of registered voters is lowest in the state. Registered Democrats outnumber Republicans by a better than 4 to 1 margin, with Republican registration percentage one of the lowest of any district statewide.

== Political representation ==
For the 2026–2027 session, the 20th legislative district of the New Jersey Legislature is represented in the State Senate by Joseph Cryan (D, Union Township) and in the General Assembly by Annette Quijano (D, Elizabeth) and Ed Rodriguez (D, Elizabeth).

The legislative district overlaps with 8th and 10th congressional districts.

== Apportionment history ==
When the 40-district legislative map was created in 1973, the 20th was a central Union County-based district including Westfield, Garwood, Cranford, Roselle, Roselle Park, Union Township, and Hillside Township. In the 1981 redistricting, the 20th district received completely new municipalities in eastern Union County including Elizabeth, Linden, Rahway, and Carteret in Middlesex County, New Jersey. Carteret was removed from the district following the 1991 redistricting but Roselle was added from the 21st district.

Changes to the district made as part of the New Jersey Legislative redistricting in 2001, based on the results of the 2000 United States census removed Linden and Rahway (both to the 22nd legislative district) and added Kenilworth and Union Township (both from the 21st district). As part of the 2011 apportionment, Hillside was added from the 29th district, while Kenilworth Borough was shifted to the 21st district.

In the 1973 State Senate race, Alexander J. Menza defeated incumbent Republican Frank X. McDermott, who had served 10 years in office, helping the Democrats gain control of the state legislature for only the third time in the 20th century.

In the 1975 elections, McDermott made a comeback and won a seat in the Assembly. In the 1977 Senate race, Menza chose not to run for re-election (he would run a distant third in the 1978 United States Senate primaries). McDermott ran again for the seat, losing to Democrat Anthony E. Russo.

In redistricting following the 1980 United States census, C. Louis Bassano was shifted to the 21st legislative district, where he ran for (and won) the State Senate seat. Chuck Hardwick was also shifted to the 21st district, where he would win the Assembly seat. With both seats open, Democrats Thomas J. Deverin and Raymond Lesniak, who had both previously served as representatives of the 21st district, won in the Assembly. In the Senate race that year, Anthony E. Russo was also shifted to the 21st district and was replaced by John T. Gregorio, an incumbent Democrat who was shifted from the 21st district.

Gregorio was forced to resign in 1983 after being convicted of conspiracy for concealing his ownership of two go-go bars that were operated by his son. In a June 1983 special election, Lesniak won the seat Gregorio was forced to vacate. In turn, another special election was held in August 1983 to fill Lesniak's vacancy, a race that was won by Thomas W. Long.

After five terms in the 20th district, Thomas J. Deverin was relocated to the 19th legislative district in 1991, with redistricting following the 1990 census tending to favor Republicans. In the 1991 Republican landslide, the 20th bucked the trend, with incumbent George Hudak and Elizabeth Mayor Thomas G. Dunn narrowly holding on to the seats for the Democrats. Hudak and Dunn did not run for re-election in 1993.

In the 1993 election, two former Union County Freeholders, Joseph Suliga and Neil M. Cohen (the latter also served in the Assembly from 1990 to 1992 from the 21st district) were elected. Suliga represented the district in the Assembly until 2002, when he was shifted to the 22nd legislative district as part of the 2001 redistricting, and was elected to the State Senate.Joseph Cryan was elected to the Assembly in 2001, filling Suliga's Assembly seat.

Cohen resigned from the Assembly on July 24, 2008, after images of child pornography were found on his state-issued computer. Democratic committee members from the district selected Annette Quijano to fill Cohen's vacancy.

Joseph Cryan stepped down on January 4, 2015 to become Union County Sheriff. The Union County Democrats selected Roselle Mayor Jamel Holley as his replacement on January 21, 2015.

== Election history ==
Senators and Assembly members elected from the district are as follows:

| Session | Senate | General Assembly | |
|---|---|---|---|
| 1974–1975 | Alexander J. Menza (D) | John J. McCarthy (D) | Joseph L. Garrubbo (D) |
| 1976–1977 | Alexander J. Menza (D) | C. Louis Bassano (R) | Frank X. McDermott (R) |
| 1978–1979 | Anthony E. Russo (D) | C. Louis Bassano (R) | Chuck Hardwick (R) |
| 1980–1981 | Anthony E. Russo (D) | C. Louis Bassano (R) | Chuck Hardwick (R) |
| 1982–1983 | John T. Gregorio (D) (Note: Terminated on March 15, 1983 after a criminal conviction) | Thomas J. Deverin (D) | Raymond Lesniak (D) (Note: Elected to the Senate in June 7, 1983 special election, sworn in on June 16, 1983) |
| 1982–1983 | Raymond Lesniak (D) | Thomas J. Deverin (D) | Thomas W. Long (D) (Note: Elected to the Assembly in August 2, 1983 special election, sworn in on September 6, 1983) |
| 1984–1985 | Raymond Lesniak (D) | Thomas J. Deverin (D) | Thomas W. Long (D) |
| 1986–1987 | Raymond Lesniak (D) | Thomas J. Deverin (D) | George Hudak (D) |
| 1988–1989 | Raymond Lesniak (D) | Thomas J. Deverin (D) | George Hudak (D) |
| 1990–1991 | Raymond Lesniak (D) | Thomas J. Deverin (D) | George Hudak (D) |
| 1992–1993 | Raymond Lesniak (D) | Thomas G. Dunn (D) | George Hudak (D) |
| 1994–1995 | Raymond Lesniak (D) | Neil M. Cohen (D) | Joseph Suliga (D) |
| 1996–1997 | Raymond Lesniak (D) | Neil M. Cohen (D) | Joseph Suliga (D) |
| 1998–1999 | Raymond Lesniak (D) | Neil M. Cohen (D) | Joseph Suliga (D) |
| 2000–2001 | Raymond Lesniak (D) | Neil M. Cohen (D) | Joseph Suliga (D) |
| 2002–2003 | Raymond Lesniak (D) | Neil M. Cohen (D) | Joseph Cryan (D) |
| 2004–2005 | Raymond Lesniak (D) | Neil M. Cohen (D) | Joseph Cryan (D) |
| 2006–2007 | Raymond Lesniak (D) | Neil M. Cohen (D) | Joseph Cryan (D) |
| 2008–2009 | Raymond Lesniak (D) | Neil M. Cohen (D) (Note: Resigned July 28, 2008) | Joseph Cryan (D) |
| 2008–2009 | Raymond Lesniak (D) | Annette Quijano (D) (Note: Appointed to the Assembly on September 25, 2008, won November 4, 2008 special election to complete term) | Joseph Cryan (D) |
| 2010–2011 | Raymond Lesniak (D) | Annette Quijano (D) | Joseph Cryan (D) |
| 2012–2013 | Raymond Lesniak (D) | Annette Quijano (D) | Joseph Cryan (D) |
| 2014–2015 | Raymond Lesniak (D) | Annette Quijano (D) | Joseph Cryan (D) (Note: Resigned January 4, 2015 to become Union County Sheriff) |
| 2014–2015 | Raymond Lesniak (D) | Annette Quijano (D) | Jamel Holley (D) (Note: Appointed to the Assembly on January 21, 2015) |
| 2016–2017 | Raymond Lesniak (D) | Annette Quijano (D) | Jamel Holley (D) |
| 2018–2019 | Joseph Cryan (D) | Annette Quijano (D) | Jamel Holley (D) |
| 2020–2021 | Joseph Cryan (D) | Annette Quijano (D) | Jamel Holley (D) |
| 2022–2023 | Joseph Cryan (D) | Annette Quijano (D) | Reginald Atkins (D) |
| 2024–2025 | Joseph Cryan (D) | Annette Quijano (D) | Reginald Atkins (D) |
| 2026–2027 | Joseph Cryan (D) | Annette Quijano (D) | Ed Rodriguez (D) |

== Election results ==
=== Senate ===
2021 New Jersey general election
| Party | Candidate | Votes | % | ±% |
|---|---|---|---|---|
| Democratic | Joseph Cryan | 26,603 | 100.0 | ▲16.3 |
| Total votes | | 26,603 | 100.0 | |

New Jersey general election, 2017
| Party | Candidate | Votes | % | ±% |
|---|---|---|---|---|
| Democratic | Joseph P. Cryan | 25,772 | 83.7 | ▼16.3 |
| Republican | Ashraf Hanna | 5,023 | 16.3 | N/A |
| Total votes | | 30,795 | 100.0 | |

New Jersey general election, 2013
| Party | Candidate | Votes | % | ±% |
|---|---|---|---|---|
| Democratic | Raymond J. Lesniak | 21,251 | 100.0 | ▲24.5 |
| Total votes | | 21,251 | 100.0 | |

2011 New Jersey general election
| Party | Candidate | Votes | % |
|---|---|---|---|
| Democratic | Raymond J. Lesniak | 12,510 | 75.5 |
| Republican | Helen S. Rosales | 4,052 | 24.5 |
| Total votes | | 16,562 | 100.0 |

2007 New Jersey general election
| Party | Candidate | Votes | % | ±% |
|---|---|---|---|---|
| Democratic | Raymond J. Lesniak | 9,760 | 58.7 | ▼3.5 |
| Republican | Linda Gaglione | 4,478 | 26.9 | ▼9.4 |
| Clean Up Government | Stanley J. Moskal | 2,387 | 14.4 | N/A |
| Total votes | | 16,625 | 100.0 | |

2003 New Jersey general election
| Party | Candidate | Votes | % | ±% |
|---|---|---|---|---|
| Democratic | Raymond J. Lesniak | 12,361 | 62.2 | ▼17.8 |
| Republican | Daniel M. Nozza | 7,217 | 36.3 | ▲16.3 |
| Restore NJ State | Shawn P. Gianella | 298 | 1.5 | N/A |
| Total votes | | 19,876 | 100.0 | |

2001 New Jersey general election
| Party | Candidate | Votes | % |
|---|---|---|---|
| Democratic | Raymond J. Lesniak | 22,817 | 80.0 |
| Schundler for Governor | Daniel M. Nozza | 5,698 | 20.0 |
| Total votes | | 28,515 | 100.0 |

1997 New Jersey general election
| Party | Candidate | Votes | % | ±% |
|---|---|---|---|---|
| Democratic | Raymond J. Lesniak | 26,699 | 69.1 | ▲9.2 |
| Republican | Gene Andre | 11,928 | 30.9 | ▼9.2 |
| Total votes | | 38,627 | 100.0 | |

1993 New Jersey general election
| Party | Candidate | Votes | % | ±% |
|---|---|---|---|---|
| Democratic | Raymond J. Lesniak | 23,845 | 59.9 | ▲2.8 |
| Republican | William P. Wnuck | 15,945 | 40.1 | ▼2.8 |
| Total votes | | 39,790 | 100.0 | |

1991 New Jersey general election
| Party | Candidate | Votes | % |
|---|---|---|---|
| Democratic | Raymond J. Lesniak | 16,733 | 57.1 |
| Republican | Jeffrey B. Cohen | 12,585 | 42.9 |
| Total votes | | 29,318 | 100.0 |

1987 New Jersey general election
| Party | Candidate | Votes | % | ±% |
|---|---|---|---|---|
| Democratic | Raymond J. Lesniak | 23,183 | 100.0 | ▲35.5 |
| Total votes | | 23,183 | 100.0 | |

1983 New Jersey general election
| Party | Candidate | Votes | % | ±% |
|---|---|---|---|---|
| Democratic | Raymond J. Lesniak | 23,246 | 64.5 | ▼0.6 |
| Republican | Alfred D. Palermo | 11,868 | 32.9 | ▲5.4 |
| Inflation Fighting Housewife | Rose Zeidwerg Monyek | 389 | 1.1 | ▼2.4 |
| Beam the Bomb | Joseph P. Scanlon | 305 | 0.8 | N/A |
| Independent | Harold J. Young | 217 | 0.6 | ▼3.3 |
| Total votes | | 36,025 | 100.0 | |

Special election, June 7, 1983
| Party | Candidate | Votes | % | ±% |
|---|---|---|---|---|
| Democratic | Raymond J. Lesniak | 12,322 | 65.1 | ▲12.8 |
| Republican | Alfred D. Palermo | 5,214 | 27.5 | ▼20.2 |
| Independent | Harold J. Young | 733 | 3.9 | N/A |
| Inflation Fighting Housewife | Rose Zeidwerg Monyek | 670 | 3.5 | N/A |
| Total votes | | 18,939 | 100.0 | |

1981 New Jersey general election
| Party | Candidate | Votes | % |
|---|---|---|---|
| Democratic | John T. Gregorio | 25,340 | 52.3 |
| Republican | John Fenick | 23,087 | 47.7 |
| Total votes | | 48,427 | 100.0 |

1977 New Jersey general election
| Party | Candidate | Votes | % | ±% |
|---|---|---|---|---|
| Democratic | Anthony E. Russo | 30,057 | 50.8 | ▼5.5 |
| Republican | Francis X. McDermott | 29,067 | 49.2 | ▲6.0 |
| Total votes | | 59,124 | 100.0 | |

1973 New Jersey general election
| Party | Candidate | Votes | % |
|---|---|---|---|
| Democratic | Alexander J. Menza | 34,040 | 56.3 |
| Republican | Francis X. McDermott | 26,084 | 43.2 |
| Individualist | Oscar B. Johannsen | 305 | 0.5 |
| Total votes | | 60,429 | 100.0 |

=== General Assembly ===
2021 New Jersey general election
| Party | Candidate | Votes | % | ±% |
|---|---|---|---|---|
| Democratic | Annette Quijano | 26,276 | 50.8 | ▲9.9 |
| Democratic | Reginald Atkins | 25,477 | 49.2 | ▲10.5 |
| Total votes | | 51,753 | 100.0 | |

2019 New Jersey general election
| Party | Candidate | Votes | % | ±% |
|---|---|---|---|---|
| Democratic | Annette Quijano | 14,373 | 40.9 | ▼4.5 |
| Democratic | Jamel C. Holley | 13,612 | 38.7 | ▼5.9 |
| Republican | Charles Donnelly | 3,727 | 10.6 | ▲0.6 |
| Republican | Ashraf Hanna | 3,441 | 9.8 | N/A |
| Total votes | | 35,153 | 100.0 | |

New Jersey general election, 2017
| Party | Candidate | Votes | % | ±% |
|---|---|---|---|---|
| Democratic | Annette Quijano | 24,221 | 45.4 | ▲6.0 |
| Democratic | Jamel C. Holley | 23,790 | 44.6 | ▲6.8 |
| Republican | Joseph G. Aubourg | 5,361 | 10.0 | ▼1.7 |
| Total votes | | 53,372 | 100.0 | |

New Jersey general election, 2015
| Party | Candidate | Votes | % | ±% |
|---|---|---|---|---|
| Democratic | Annette Quijano | 12,061 | 39.4 | ▲3.9 |
| Democratic | Jamel Holley | 11,568 | 37.8 | ▲1.5 |
| Republican | Stephen E. Kozlovich | 3,593 | 11.7 | ▼2.8 |
| Republican | Roger Stryeski | 3,398 | 11.1 | ▼2.6 |
| Total votes | | 30,620 | 100.0 | |

New Jersey general election, 2013
| Party | Candidate | Votes | % | ±% |
|---|---|---|---|---|
| Democratic | Joseph Cryan | 19,268 | 36.3 | ▼6.1 |
| Democratic | Annette Quijano | 18,839 | 35.5 | ▼7.2 |
| Republican | Charles Donnelly | 7,719 | 14.5 | ▼0.1 |
| Republican | Christopher Hackett | 7,269 | 13.7 | N/A |
| Total votes | | 53,095 | 100.0 | |

New Jersey general election, 2011
| Party | Candidate | Votes | % |
|---|---|---|---|
| Democratic | Annette Quijano | 12,116 | 42.7 |
| Democratic | Joseph Cryan | 12,104 | 42.7 |
| Republican | John F. Donoso | 4,128 | 14.6 |
| Total votes | | 28,348 | 100.0 |

New Jersey general election, 2009
| Party | Candidate | Votes | % | ±% |
|---|---|---|---|---|
| Democratic | Joseph Cryan | 20,607 | 50.7 | ▲15.5 |
| Democratic | Annette Quijano | 20,054 | 49.3 | ▲12.6 |
| Total votes | | 40,661 | 100.0 | |

Special election, November 4, 2008
| Party | Candidate | Votes | % |
|---|---|---|---|
| Democratic | Annette Quijano | 35,746 | 71.2 |
| Republican | Linda Gaglione | 14,458 | 28.8 |
| Total votes | | 50,204 | 100.0 |

New Jersey general election, 2007
| Party | Candidate | Votes | % | ±% |
|---|---|---|---|---|
| Democratic | Neil Cohen | 10,000 | 36.7 | ▼13.6 |
| Democratic | Joseph Cryan | 9,583 | 35.2 | ▼14.5 |
| Clean Up Government | Marlene J. Abitanto | 3,858 | 14.2 | N/A |
| Clean Up Government | Lester Dominguez | 3,810 | 14.0 | N/A |
| Total votes | | 27,251 | 100.0 | |

New Jersey general election, 2005
| Party | Candidate | Votes | % | ±% |
|---|---|---|---|---|
| Democratic | Neil M. Cohen | 23,668 | 50.3 | ▲18.9 |
| Democratic | Joseph Cryan | 23,345 | 49.7 | ▲18.4 |
| Total votes | | 47,013 | 100.0 | |

New Jersey general election, 2003
| Party | Candidate | Votes | % | ±% |
|---|---|---|---|---|
| Democratic | Neil M. Cohen | 12,035 | 31.4 | ▼9.9 |
| Democratic | Joseph Cryan | 12,016 | 31.3 | ▼9.5 |
| Republican | A. Tony Monteiro | 7,515 | 19.6 | N/A |
| Republican | Aristo Carranza | 6,821 | 17.8 | N/A |
| Total votes | | 38,387 | 100.0 | |

New Jersey general election, 2001
| Party | Candidate | Votes | % |
|---|---|---|---|
| Democratic | Neil M. Cohen | 22,457 | 41.3 |
| Democratic | Joseph Cryan | 22,162 | 40.8 |
| Schundler for Governor | Dency J. Rivera | 4,877 | 9.0 |
| Schundler for Governor | Ralph J. Fabre | 4,852 | 8.9 |
| Total votes | | 54,348 | 100.0 |

New Jersey general election, 1999
| Party | Candidate | Votes | % | ±% |
|---|---|---|---|---|
| Democratic | Neil M. Cohen | 14,532 | 38.4 | ▲3.6 |
| Democratic | Joseph S. Suliga | 14,195 | 37.5 | ▲2.5 |
| Republican | Dirk Weber | 4,606 | 12.2 | ▼2.9 |
| Republican | Elvira Drzewinski | 4,553 | 12.0 | ▼3.1 |
| Total votes | | 37,886 | 100.0 | |

New Jersey general election, 1997
| Party | Candidate | Votes | % | ±% |
|---|---|---|---|---|
| Democratic | Joseph S. Suliga | 26,348 | 35.0 | ▲0.5 |
| Democratic | Neil M. Cohen | 26,242 | 34.8 | 0.0 |
| Republican | Daniel B. Levine | 11,380 | 15.1 | ▲1.7 |
| Republican | Richard A. Revilla | 11,366 | 15.1 | ▲1.7 |
| Total votes | | 75,336 | 100.0 | |

New Jersey general election, 1995
| Party | Candidate | Votes | % | ±% |
|---|---|---|---|---|
| Democratic | Neil M. Cohen | 14,838 | 34.8 | ▲8.9 |
| Democratic | Joseph S. Suliga | 14,697 | 34.5 | ▲9.0 |
| Republican | Thomas Rocco | 5,730 | 13.4 | ▼4.6 |
| Republican | Richard Revilla | 5,724 | 13.4 | ▼2.8 |
| Conservative | Dorothy De Laura | 856 | 2.0 | N/A |
| Conservative | David Csuray | 799 | 1.9 | N/A |
| Total votes | | 42,644 | 100.0 | |

New Jersey general election, 1993
| Party | Candidate | Votes | % | ±% |
|---|---|---|---|---|
| Democratic | Neil M. Cohen | 20,676 | 25.9 | ▼0.8 |
| Democratic | Joseph Suliga | 20,300 | 25.5 | ▼0.2 |
| Republican | Richard Hunt | 14,329 | 18.0 | ▼6.1 |
| Republican | Carmen Mendiola | 12,905 | 16.2 | ▼7.3 |
| For the People | Thomas W. Long | 8,099 | 10.2 | N/A |
| The Peoples Candidate | Jerry L. Coleman | 3,388 | 4.3 | N/A |
| Total votes | | 79,697 | 100.0 | |

1991 New Jersey general election
| Party | Candidate | Votes | % |
|---|---|---|---|
| Democratic | George Hudak | 15,032 | 26.7 |
| Democratic | Tom Dunn | 14,442 | 25.7 |
| Republican | Richard E. Hunt | 13,555 | 24.1 |
| Republican | Philip G. Gentile | 13,188 | 23.5 |
| Total votes | | 56,217 | 100.0 |

1989 New Jersey general election
| Party | Candidate | Votes | % | ±% |
|---|---|---|---|---|
| Democratic | George Hudak | 27,871 | 35.8 | ▼1.4 |
| Democratic | Thomas J. Deverin | 27,848 | 35.8 | ▼2.0 |
| Republican | Thomas C. Cusmano | 10,653 | 13.7 | ▲1.2 |
| Republican | Jeffrey B. Cohen | 10,469 | 13.5 | ▲1.0 |
| Populist | Kevin F. Brown | 973 | 1.3 | N/A |
| Total votes | | 77,814 | 100.0 | |

1987 New Jersey general election
| Party | Candidate | Votes | % | ±% |
|---|---|---|---|---|
| Democratic | Thomas J. Deverin | 21,702 | 37.8 | ▲12.3 |
| Democratic | George Hudak | 21,380 | 37.2 | ▲14.1 |
| Republican | William Wnuck | 7,181 | 12.5 | ▼6.2 |
| Republican | Peter Kobylarz | 7,155 | 12.5 | ▼4.3 |
| Total votes | | 57,418 | 100.0 | |

1985 New Jersey general election
| Party | Candidate | Votes | % | ±% |
|---|---|---|---|---|
| Democratic | Thomas J. Deverin | 19,892 | 25.5 | ▼9.4 |
| Democratic | George Hudak | 18,085 | 23.1 | ▼11.7 |
| Republican | Michael A. Posnock | 14,617 | 18.7 | ▲3.3 |
| Republican | Alice A. Holzapfel | 13,134 | 16.8 | ▲1.8 |
| Experienced-Competent-Courageous | Tom Dunn | 10,174 | 13.0 | N/A |
| "Inflation Fighting Housewife" | Rose Zeidwerg Monyek | 2,240 | 2.9 | N/A |
| Total votes | | 78,142 | 100.0 | |

New Jersey general election, 1983
| Party | Candidate | Votes | % | ±% |
|---|---|---|---|---|
| Democratic | Thomas J. Deverin | 23,757 | 34.9 | ▲4.0 |
| Democratic | Thomas W. Long | 23,700 | 34.8 | ▲1.8 |
| Republican | Andrew Fydryszewski | 10,480 | 15.4 | ▼3.3 |
| Republican | Mark E. Pena | 10,187 | 15.0 | ▼2.5 |
| Total votes | | 68,124 | 100.0 | |

Special election, August 2, 1983
| Party | Candidate | Votes | % |
|---|---|---|---|
| Democratic | Thomas W. Long | 3,523 | 82.3 |
| Independent Like You | Henry Kielbasa | 758 | 17.7 |
| Total votes | | 4,281 | 100.0 |

New Jersey general election, 1981
| Party | Candidate | Votes | % |
|---|---|---|---|
| Democratic | Raymond J. Lesniak | 32,243 | 33.0 |
| Democratic | Thomas J. Deverin | 30,147 | 30.9 |
| Republican | Blanche Banasiak | 18,252 | 18.7 |
| Republican | James J. Fulcomer | 17,069 | 17.5 |
| Total votes | | 97,711 | 100.0 |

New Jersey general election, 1979
| Party | Candidate | Votes | % | ±% |
|---|---|---|---|---|
| Republican | C. Louis Bassano | 29,672 | 31.7 | ▲3.8 |
| Republican | Chuck Hardwick | 28,707 | 30.7 | ▲4.8 |
| Democratic | E. Jonathan Bell | 17,823 | 19.0 | ▼4.1 |
| Democratic | William A. Cambria | 17,359 | 18.6 | ▼3.9 |
| Total votes | | 93,561 | 100.0 | |

New Jersey general election, 1977
| Party | Candidate | Votes | % | ±% |
|---|---|---|---|---|
| Republican | C. Louis Bassano | 31,819 | 27.9 | ▲2.2 |
| Republican | Charles L. Hardwick | 29,540 | 25.9 | ▼0.7 |
| Democratic | Vincent P. Baldassano | 26,327 | 23.1 | ▼1.6 |
| Democratic | Daniel J. Mason | 25,704 | 22.5 | ▼0.5 |
| U.S. Labor | Bruce Todd | 783 | 0.7 | N/A |
| Total votes | | 114,173 | 100.0 | |

New Jersey general election, 1975
| Party | Candidate | Votes | % | ±% |
|---|---|---|---|---|
| Republican | Frank X. McDermott | 29,162 | 26.6 | ▲6.0 |
| Republican | C. Louis Bassano | 28,212 | 25.7 | ▲2.6 |
| Democratic | Joseph L. Garrubbo | 27,056 | 24.7 | ▼3.8 |
| Democratic | Brian William Fahey | 25,253 | 23.0 | ▼4.8 |
| Total votes | | 109,683 | 100.0 | |

New Jersey general election, 1973
| Party | Candidate | Votes | % |
|---|---|---|---|
| Democratic | Joseph L. Garrubbo | 32,703 | 28.5 |
| Democratic | John J. McCarthy | 31,853 | 27.8 |
| Republican | C. Louis Bassano | 26,550 | 23.1 |
| Republican | Charles S. Tracy | 23,607 | 20.6 |
| Total votes | | 114,713 | 100.0 |
