= C. Louis Bassano =

American Republican Party politician

Member of the New Jersey Senate from the 21st district
- In office January 12, 1982 – April 16, 2001
- Preceded by: John T. Gregorio
- Succeeded by: Kevin J. O'Toole

Member of the New Jersey General Assembly
- In office January 13, 1976 – January 12, 1982
- Preceded by: Joseph L. Garrubbo; John J. McCarthy
- Succeeded by: Thomas J. Deverin; Raymond Lesniak
- Constituency: 20th Legislative District
- In office January 11, 1972 – January 8, 1974
- Preceded by: Elizabeth L. Cox; Hugo Pfaltz
- Succeeded by: District abolished
- Constituency: District 9B

Personal details
- Born: October 29, 1942 (age 83) Newark, New Jersey, U.S.
- Party: Republican

Charles Louis Bassano (born October 29, 1942) is an American Republican Party politician who served in both the New Jersey General Assembly and the New Jersey Senate, where he represented constituencies covering portions of Union County, New Jersey and later part of Essex County.

== Biography ==
He was born on October 29, 1942. Bassano attended Bloomfield College, where he majored in business. He was an owner of Bassano Oil, a fuel oil distribution business. Active in the Young Republicans, Bassano was elected to the State Assembly in 1971, at the age of 29. He defeated three-term Democratic Assemblyman Henry F. Gavan by 2,572 votes; Bassano ran 304 votes ahead of his own running mate, two-term Assemblyman Herbert H. Kiehn. Gavan's running mate was Donald Lan, who later became New Jersey Secretary of State and briefly a candidate for the 1981 Democratic nomination for Governor. Bassano ran for re-election to a second term in 1973 in the new 20th Legislative District, but lost his seat in the Watergate Democratic landslide. Democrats Joseph L. Garrubbo and John J. McCarthy defeated Bassano and his running mate, former Union County Freeholder Charles S. Tracy.

In 1974, Bassano ran for a seat on the Union Township Committee, where he served one three-year term. He was the Roads and Fire Departments Commissioner.

He returned to the Legislature in 1975, running for the Assembly with Frank X. McDermott, who had lost his State Senate seat two years earlier. Bassano and McDermott defeated Garrubbo and his running mate, Westfield Mayor Brian W. Fahey. Bassano won by 1,156 votes. He was re-elected in 1977 and 1979, running with Chuck Hardwick.

Bassano was elected to the State Senate from the 21st district in 1981, ousting freshman Democratic Senator Anthony E. Russo by 2,705 votes, 52%-48%. Bassano beat Russo two more times, by 566 votes in 1983 (50.5%-49.5%) and by 4,007 votes (56%-44%) in 1987. Bassano won a fourth term in 1991 with 72% of the vote against Livingston Planning Board member Elly Manov and with 64% in 1993 against Cathy Perselay Seidman. he was unopposed in his bid for a sixth term in 1997. He served as Assistant Senate Majority Whip in 1987 and 1988, as Senate Minority Whip in 1989 and as Assistant Senate Minority Leader in 1990 and 1991. In the Senate, Bassano served on the Health Committee, as Chair of the Senior Citizens, Veterans' Affairs and Human Services Committee and as Vice Chair of the Women's Issues, Children and Family Services Committee.

On April 16, 2001, Bassano resigned from the Senate to join the New Jersey Sports and Exposition Authority. He was succeeded in the Senate by Kevin O'Toole.
