= Chuck Hardwick =

American politician (1941–2025)

Charles Leighton Hardwick
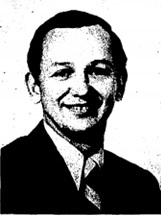
- Portrait of Charles Leighton Hardwick

Speaker of the New Jersey General Assembly
- In office January 1986 – January 1990
- Preceded by: Alan Karcher
- Succeeded by: Joseph Doria

Member of the New Jersey General Assembly
- In office January 10, 1978 – January 14, 1992 Serving with C. Louis Bassano, Edward K. Gill, Peter J. Genova and Neil M. Cohen
- Preceded by: Frank X. McDermott
- Succeeded by: Monroe Jay Lustbader; Maureen Ogden
- Constituency: 20th District (1978–1982); 21st District (1982–1992)

Minority Leader of the New Jersey General Assembly
- In office January 1985 – January 1986
- Preceded by: Dean Gallo
- Succeeded by: Alan Karcher

Personal details
- Born: Charles Leighton Hardwick; November 8, 1941 Somerset, Kentucky, U.S.
- Died: February 19, 2025 (aged 83) Florida, U.S.
- Party: Republican
- Spouse(s): Patricia Johnson Hardwick; Sheilagh Mylott

Charles Leighton Hardwick (November 8, 1941 − February 19, 2025) was an American Republican Party politician and business leader who served as Speaker of the New Jersey General Assembly and was a candidate for Governor of New Jersey.

== Early life ==
Hardwick was born in Somerset, Kentucky, the son of Joseph Fulton Hardwick (1901–1973), a maintenance worker for Wonder Bread, and Lucy Belle Hall Hardwick (1902–1946). His mother died of heart failure at age 44, when Hardwick was five years old. He attended Central High School in Akron, Ohio. Hardwick was graduated from Florida State University with BS and MBA degrees in 1964. He attended college on a scholarship provided by Wonder Bread.

== Career at Pfizer ==
Hardwick joined Pfizer Inc. in 1966 and held a number of positions in government and public affairs and in marketing before becoming vice president of government and public affairs in 1997. He was appointed senior vice president of government relations and public affairs of Pfizer Inc. in March 2001 and previously served as its vice president. Hardwick was a senior vice president of worldwide government and public affairs of Pfizer. He retired in 2005 after 39 years with Pfizer. He was a member of the Pfizer Leadership Team, the company's most senior management committee. During his tenure at Pfizer, the company grew from $500 million in worldwide sales to $50 billion. At Pfizer he was president of the Pfizer Foundation and worked closely with then CEO Hank McKinnell on providing healthcare assistance to HIV AIDS patients in the US and Africa, especially in Uganda. He spent three months in Vietnam working on the eradication of trachoma, a treatable disease that leads to blindness if untreated.

== Early political career ==
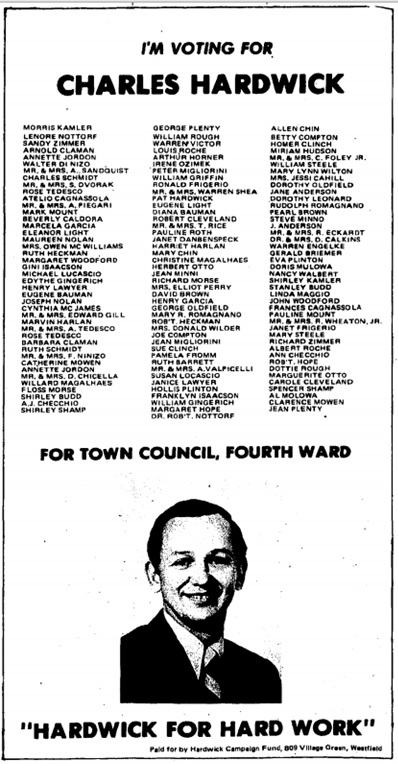
Ad from Hardwick's 1974 campaign for Westfield Councilman

Hardwick entered politics in 1974 as a candidate for Fourth Ward Councilman in Westfield, New Jersey. Despite the Democratic landslide in the Watergate year, Hardwick came within 54 votes of unseating incumbent Councilman Lawrence Weiss, 1,569 to 1,515.

He ran for Union County Freeholder in 1976 against incumbent Democrats Harold Seymour, Thomas Long and Everett Lattimore, but lost. The good news for Hardwick was that two years after losing a Council race, he carried Westfield by 4,300 votes.

== New Jersey State Assemblyman ==
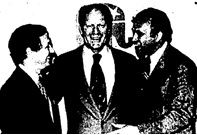
Hardwick with former President Gerald Ford and GOP gubernatorial candidate Ray Bateman during the 1977 campaign

In 1977, when Assemblyman Frank X. McDermott gave up his seat to run for the State Senate, Hardwick became a candidate for the New Jersey General Assembly. Running on a ticket with incumbent C. Louis Bassano, he was elected by 3,213 votes over Democrat Vincent P. Baldassano, the Mayor of Hillside, New Jersey.

=== Results of the 1977 State Assembly Election, New Jersey District 20 ===
C. Louis Bassano	Republican	Incumbent Assemblyman	31,819
Chuck Hardwick	Republican	Pharmaceutical Company Executive	29,540
Vincent Baldassano	Democrat	Mayor of Hillside	26,327
Daniel J. Mason	Democrat	Former Mayor of Cranford	25,704

Hardwick was re-elected in 1979, 1981, 1983, 1985, and 1987.

Hardwick did not seek re-election in 1989 but instead ran in the Republican gubernatorial primary. After his defeat, his running mate, Peter J. Genova, withdrew from the race and Hardwick was able to run again for the State Assembly. In a strong Democratic year, Hardwick's 1989 re-election bid was the most difficult of his six re-election campaigns. He finished just 173 votes ahead of Democrat Neil Cohen, who won the second Assembly seat, and 2,187 votes ahead of Democrat Brian Fahey, the former Mayor of Westfield.

He was not a candidate for re-election to an eighth term in 1991.

== Assembly Leadership ==
Hardwick was elected Assembly Assistant Minority Leader in 1984. In 1985, when Minority Leader Dean Gallo resigned to take a seat in the U.S. House of Representatives, Hardwick was elected Minority Leader.

With popular Governor Thomas Kean heading the Republican ticket in 1985, Hardwick organized a statewide campaign organization to help Republicans win a majority in the New Jersey General Assembly for the first time in twelve years. Republicans picked up 14 seats to take a 50–30 majority, and Hardwick was elected Speaker of the New Jersey General Assembly. Hardwick was assumed to be the next Assembly Speaker and scheduled a vote for the post on the Thursday after Election Day. On Wednesday, Greg Stevens, Kean's Chief of Staff, began making calls to secure votes for Walter Kavanaugh of Somerset County for Speaker. "Hardwick was no lapdog for the administration, but he had the support of his caucus and Kavanaugh dropped out within hours." Hardwick was elected Speaker of the New Jersey General Assembly. He became the first Republican Speaker since Kean held the job in 1973. Republicans held their majority in the 1987 mid-term elections, giving Hardwick a second two-year term as Speaker. During his fourteen years as an Assemblyman, Hardwick's legislative record included addressing the social issues around gambling, especially compulsive gambling, implementing guidelines for strip searches for people arrested for minor offenses and improving the adoption process by providing the health histories of biological parents when feasible. He wrote op-eds often that were published in The New York Times and elsewhere.

In 1988 he was vice-chairman of the Republican National Convention Platform Committee. President Reagan named him to the Presidential Advisory Committee on Federalism. He was elected President of the Republican State Legislators Association a national organization of the GOP. He was on the executive board of the American Legislative Exchange Council (ALEC).

== Candidate for Governor of New Jersey ==
With Kean term-limited, Hardwick set his sights on the Republican nomination for governor. He announced on February 9, 1989. Eight Republicans entered the primary, with U.S. Rep. Jim Courter, who had represented parts of seven New Jersey counties in Congress, as the early front runner. The other candidates included: Attorney General W. Cary Edwards and State Senators Gerald Cardinale and William Gormley.

Hardwick largely embraced Kean's tenure as governor, pointing out some of their similarities; part of his stump speech was to ask: "How can a Republican Assembly Speaker with a gap-toothed smile, who isn't a lawyer, expect to be Governor?" But without mentioning the Governor, he attacked Kean's proposals for property tax reform and to create a coastal commission to control growth on the Jersey shore; he was highly critical of Kean's decision to renominate New Jersey Supreme Court Chief Justice Robert Wilentz, a liberal. Hardwick also picked a public fight with New York Governor Mario Cuomo, attacking New York's income tax on New Jerseyans who commute to New York. Hardwick had spent 25 years as a commuter, and his issue had appeared to strike a chord among many GOP primary voters.

The Hardwick campaign actively sought votes from the state's Right to Life Organization and the National Rifle Association. He also received endorsements from some police officer groups and attempted to attract unaffiliated voters of those groups into the Republican primary. He said he is counting heavily on the Right to Life organization, the National Rifle Association and police officers' groups that have endorsed him to bring independent voters to the polls to register as Republicans and vote for him. Hardwick won some early victories, including a win at a non-binding Middlesex County Republican Convention, where he took 51% of the delegates in a county Courter represented in Congress.

A WCAU-TV poll conducted May 29–31 showed a very close race, with the top four candidates—Courter, Edwards, Hardwick and Gormley—separated by just six points, a statistical dead heat in a poll that had a margin of error of +/-5%. The poll showed that 16% of likely Republican primary voters remained undecided just a week before the election.

Courter won the primary by 27,013 votes over Edwards, 112,326 (29.02%) to 85,313 (22.04%), with Hardwick finishing third with 85,313 votes (22.04%). Courter went on to lose the General Election by a massive 541,384 against Democratic U.S. Rep. Jim Florio.

=== Results of the 1989 Republican Primary for Governor of New Jersey ===
Jim Courter	U.S. Congressman	112,326	29.02%
W. Cary Edwards	Attorney General of New Jersey	85,313	22.04%
Chuck Hardwick	New Jersey Assembly Speaker	82,392	21.29%
William Gormley	State Senator	66,430	17.17%
Gerald Cardinale	State Senator	32,250	8.3%
Tom Blomquist	Conservative Activist	3,791	0.98%
Lois Rand	Former Kean Administration Commerce Department Official	2,553	0.66%
James A. Kolyer	Public School Teacher	1,963	0.51%

== Later life and death ==
After leaving the legislature, Hardwick moved to New York City. Mayor Rudy Giuliani appointed him to serve as Vice Chair of the New York City Council on the Environment. He also served on the Boards of the New Jersey Performing Arts Center, New Jersey After 3, Inc. and the Academic Alliance Foundation (for AIDS care in Africa).

Hardwick's first wife was Patricia Johnson Hardwick, his childhood sweetheart in Akron, Ohio. She managed his first campaign for the State Assembly. They had two children: Virginia Lee (Ginger) Hardwick and Charles Leighton Hardwick, Jr, and three grandchildren, Jacob, Sarah and Ben Lapidus. After their divorce, he married Sheilagh Mylott. In 2008, they adopted a son, Austin, whom they "fell in love with" after becoming his foster parents when he was four days old. He spent his final years in Palm Beach Gardens, Florida. He died from complications from amyotrophic lateral sclerosis in Florida, on February 19, 2025, at the age of 83.

New Jersey General Assembly
Preceded by Frank X. McDermott	Member of the New Jersey General Assembly from the 20th district 1978–1982	Succeeded by Raymond Lesniak
Preceded by Raymond Lesniak	Member of the New Jersey General Assembly from the 21st district 1982–1992	Succeeded by Maureen Ogden
Preceded by Dean Gallo	Minority Leader of the New Jersey General Assembly; 1985–1986	Succeeded by Alan Karcher
Political offices
Preceded by Alan Karcher	Speaker of the New Jersey General Assembly; 1986–1990	Succeeded by Joseph Doria
