= Senator Russo =

Senator Russo may refer to:

- Anthony E. Russo (born 1926), New Jersey State Senate
- John F. Russo (1933–2017), New Jersey State Senate
