= Linden, New Jersey =

City in Union County, New Jersey, US

- City
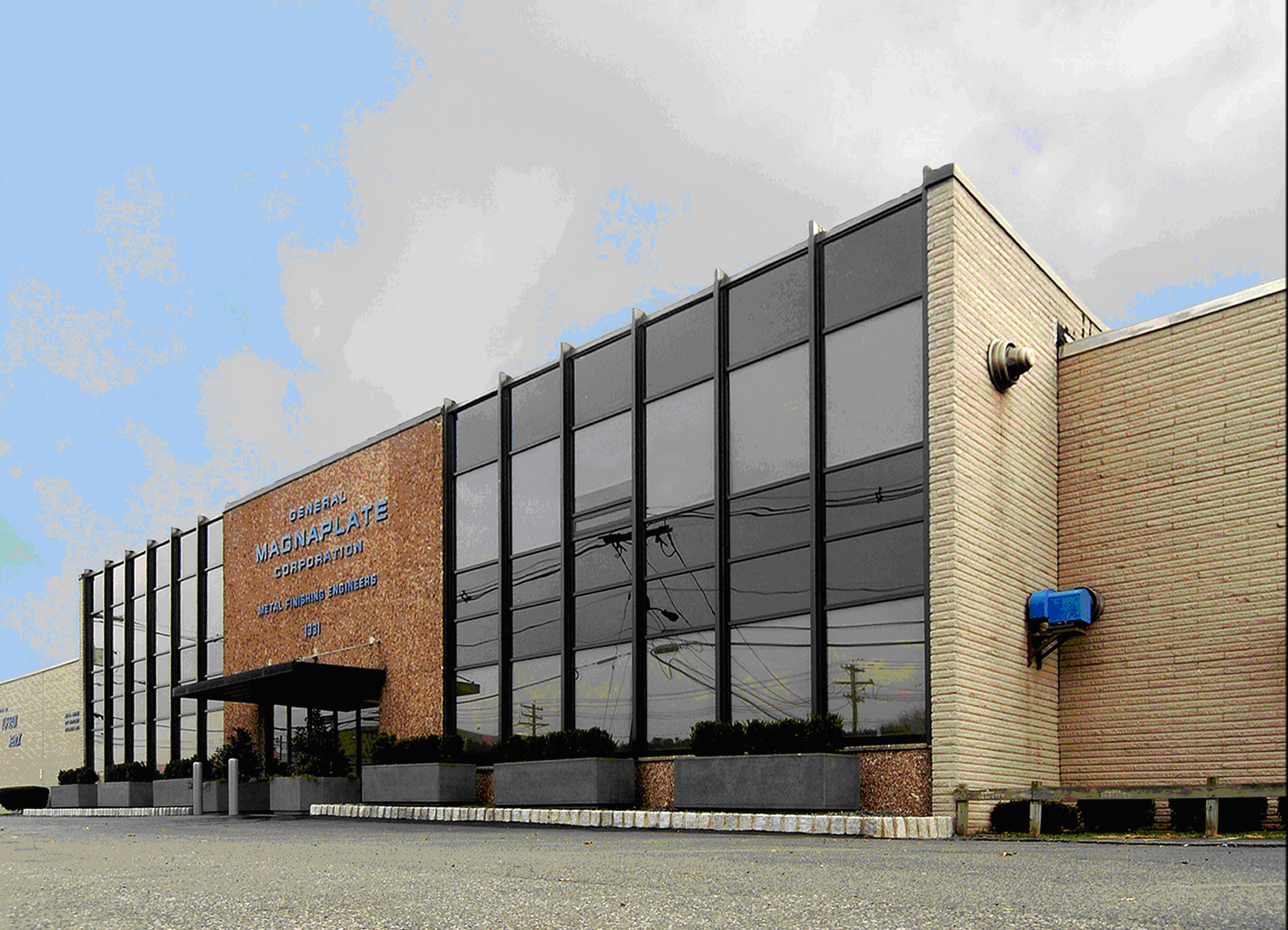
- Magnaplate building

- Seal
- Motto(s): "Big enough to lead, small enough to care"
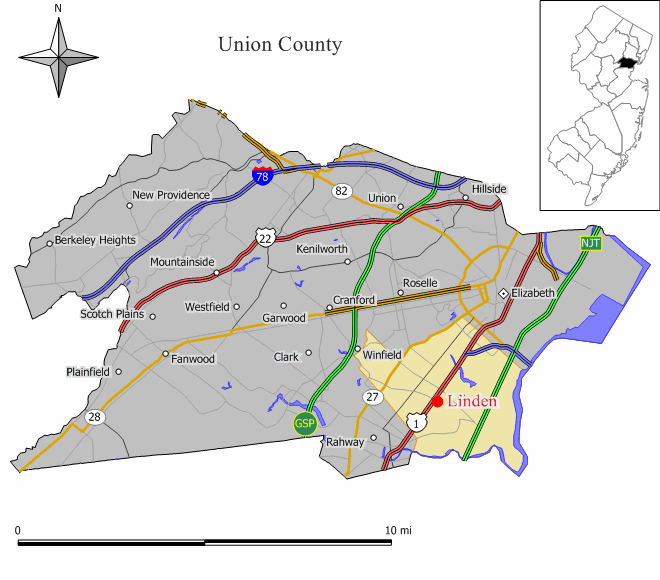
- Location of Linden in Union County highlighted in yellow (left). Inset map: Location of Union County in New Jersey highlighted in black (right).

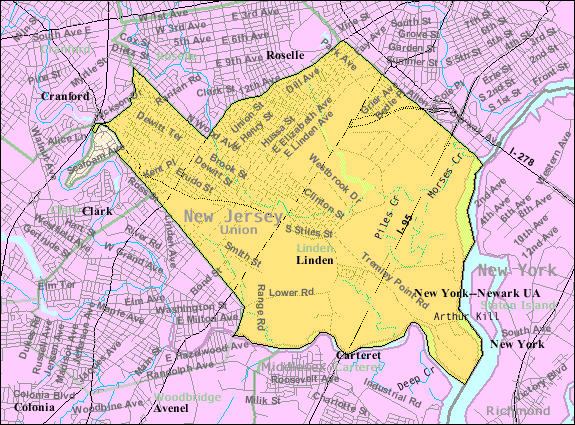
- Census Bureau map of Linden, New Jersey

- Location in Union County Location in New Jersey Location in the United States
- Coordinates: 40.627337°N 74.23631°W
- Country: United States
- State: New Jersey
- County: Union
- Incorporated: January 1, 1925

Government
  - Type: City
  - Body: City Council
  - Mayor: Derek Armstead (D, term ends December 31, 2026)
  - Municipal clerk: Joseph C. Bodek

Area
  - Total: 11.35 sq mi (29.39 km^{2})
  - Land: 10.69 sq mi (27.68 km^{2})
  - Water: 0.66 sq mi (1.71 km^{2}) 6.37%
  - Rank: 199th of 565 in state 2nd of 21 in county
- Elevation: 7 ft (2.1 m)

Population (2020)
  - Total: 43,738
  - Estimate (2023): 43,950
  - Rank: 52nd of 565 in state 4th of 21 in county
  - Density: 4,092.3/sq mi (1,580.0/km^{2})
  - Rank: 153rd of 565 in state 13th of 21 in county
- Time zone: UTC−05:00 (Eastern (EST))
  - Summer (DST): UTC−04:00 (Eastern (EDT))
- ZIP Code: 07036
- Area code: 908
- FIPS code: 3403940350
- GNIS feature ID: 0885278
- Website: linden-nj.gov

Linden is a city in southeastern Union County, in the U.S. state of New Jersey. It is part of the New York metropolitan area, located about 13 miles (21 km) southwest of Manhattan and bordering Staten Island, a borough of New York City, across the Arthur Kill. As of the 2020 United States census, the city's population was 43,738, an increase of 3,239 (+8.0%) from the 2010 census count of 40,499, which in turn reflected an increase of 1,105 (+2.8%) from the 39,394 counted in the 2000 census. In 2015, Linden was listed as the most polluted community in New Jersey, based on the volume of toxic chemicals released into the local environment by facilities in the city.

== History ==
Linden was originally formed as a township on March 4, 1861, from portions of Elizabeth, Rahway and Union Township. Portions of the township were taken to form Cranford (March 14, 1871), Linden Borough (March 30, 1882) and Roselle (December 20, 1894). Linden was incorporated as a city by an act of the New Jersey Legislature on January 1, 1925, replacing both Linden Township and Linden Borough, based on the results of a referendum held on November 8, 1923. The city's name derives from linden trees brought from Germany.

== Geography ==
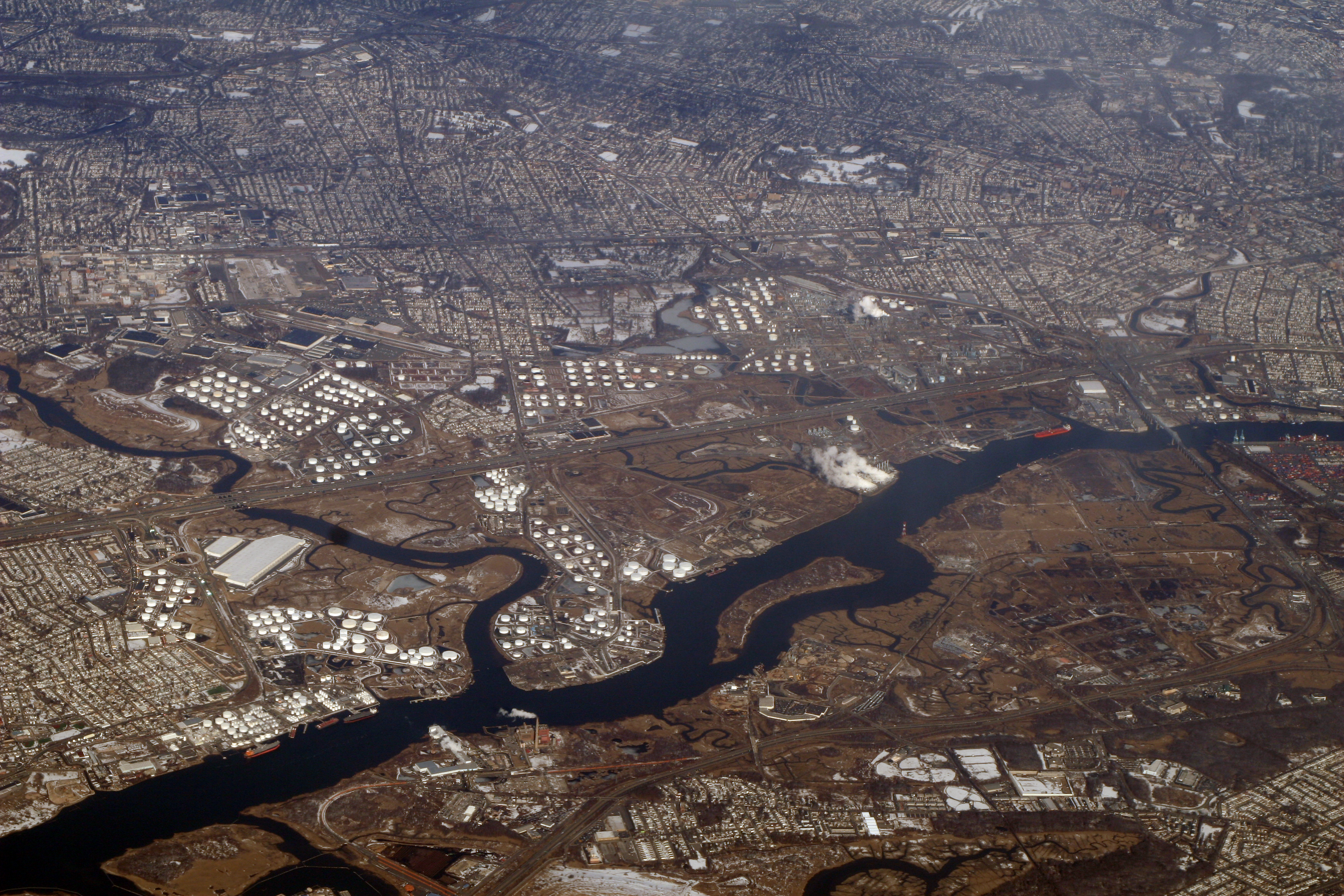
Linden lies west of the Arthur Kill and north of the Rahway River

According to the United States Census Bureau, the city had a total area of 11.42 square miles (29.56 km^{2}), including 10.69 square miles (27.68 km^{2}) of land and 0.73 square miles (1.88 km^{2}) of water (6.37%).

Unincorporated communities, localities and place names located partially or completely within the city include Bayway, Grasselli, Morses Mill, Tremley, Sunnyside, Vreeland Mills, Warners and Wheatsheaf.

The city borders the municipalities of Clark, Cranford, Elizabeth, Rahway, Roselle and Winfield Township in Union County; Carteret and Woodbridge Township in Middlesex County; and Staten Island in New York City across the Arthur Kill tidal strait.

== Polish and Polish-American community ==
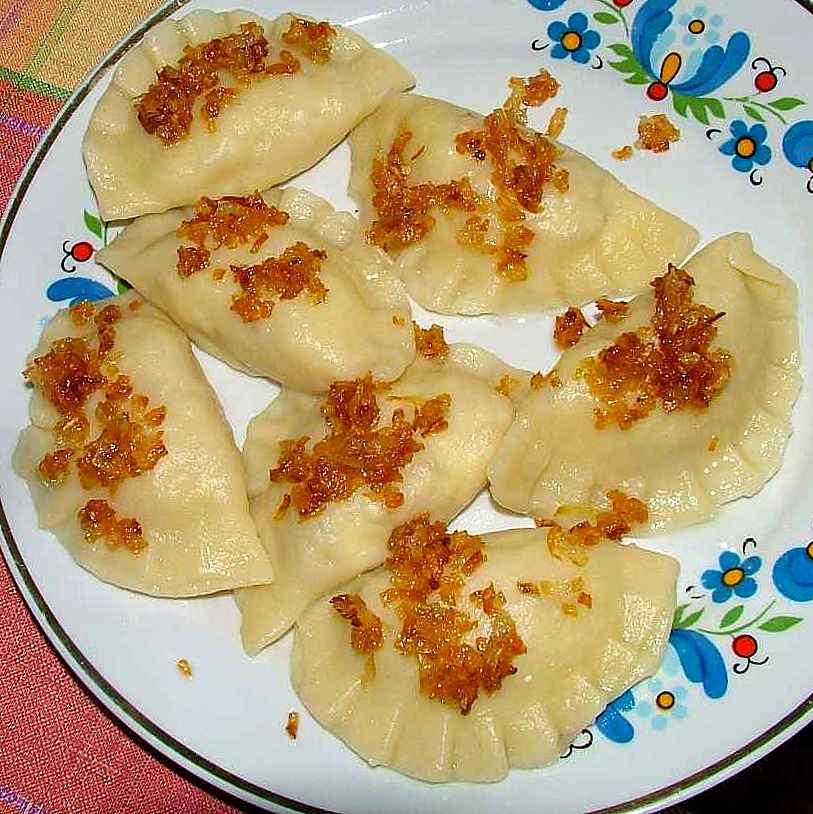
As a regional hub of Polish immigration, Linden is known for its Polish cuisine such as pierogis

Linden is a regional hub of Polish immigration and features a significant number of establishments featuring the food and culture of Poland. 13.1% of residents are of Polish origin and 15.6% of its residents five years old and above in the center of the city of Linden primarily speak the Polish language at home. The Skulski Art Gallery of the Polish Cultural Foundation of neighboring Clark has exhibited Linden-based artists.

Polish-American grocery specialty shop Pulaski Meats takes up nearly a city block. Polish language services are held at two Roman Catholic churches, including at the heavily Polish parish St. Theresa of the Child Jesus Roman Catholic Church, established in the 1920s.

Linden holds an annual Polish Heritage Day Festival to showcase local Polish cuisine, pottery, dance, traditional fashion and other Polish arts for visitors. In 2021, the mayor of Linden hosted a state visit by Poland's president Andrzej Duda and first lady Agata Kornhauser-Duda to the Polish community in Linden.

In old pagan Slavic mythology, the tree for which the city is named, the linden tree (lipa, as called in all Slavic languages) was considered a sacred tree.

== Demographics ==
Historical population
Census	Pop.	Note	%±
1870	1,396		—
1880	1,889	*	35.3%
1890	2,057		8.9%
1900	1,021	*	−50.4%
1910	2,598		154.5%
1920	8,368		222.1%
1930	21,206		153.4%
1940	24,115		13.7%
1950	30,644		27.1%
1960	39,931		30.3%
1970	41,409		3.7%
1980	37,836		−8.6%
1990	36,701		−3.0%
2000	39,394		7.3%
2010	40,499		2.8%
2020	43,738		8.0%
2023 (est.)	43,950		0.5%
Population sources: 1870–1920 1870 1880–1890; 1890–1910 1910–1930; 1940–2000 2000; 2010 2020 *=Lost territory in previous decade.

=== Racial and ethnic composition ===
Linden, New Jersey – Racial and ethnic composition Note: the US Census treats Hispanic/Latino as an ethnic category. This table excludes Latinos from the racial categories and assigns them to a separate category. Hispanics/Latinos may be of any race.
Race / Ethnicity (NH = Non-Hispanic)	Pop 1990	Pop 2000	Pop. 2010	Pop. 2020	% 1990	% 2000	% 2010	% 2020
White alone (NH)	26,167	22,827	18,089	13,744	71.30%	57.95%	44.67%	31.42%
Black or African American alone (NH)	7,229	8,782	10,403	11,722	19.70%	22.29%	25.69%	26.80%
Native American or Alaska Native alone (NH)	48	43	58	33	0.13%	0.11%	0.14%	0.08%
Asian alone (NH)	534	914	1,066	1,484	1.46%	2.32%	2.63%	3.39%
Pacific Islander alone (NH)	N/A	14	8	5	N/A	0.04%	0.02%	0.01%
Some other race alone (NH)	23	125	166	541	0.06%	0.32%	0.41%	1.24%
Mixed-race or multi-racial (NH)	N/A	1,015	614	1,154	N/A	2.58%	1.52%	2.64%
Hispanic or Latino (any race)	2,700	5,674	10,095	15,055	7.36%	14.40%	24.93%	34.42%
Total	36,701	39,394	40,499	43,738	100.00%	100.00%	100.00%	100.00%

=== 2020 census ===
As of the 2020 census, Linden had a population of 43,738. The median age was 39.4 years. 21.1% of residents were under the age of 18 and 14.6% of residents were 65 years of age or older. For every 100 females there were 91.1 males, and for every 100 females age 18 and over there were 87.5 males age 18 and over.

100.0% of residents lived in urban areas, while 0.0% lived in rural areas.

There were 15,609 households in Linden, of which 33.2% had children under the age of 18 living in them. Of all households, 43.3% were married-couple households, 18.3% were households with a male householder and no spouse or partner present, and 31.7% were households with a female householder and no spouse or partner present. About 25.2% of all households were made up of individuals and 9.9% had someone living alone who was 65 years of age or older.

There were 16,452 housing units, of which 5.1% were vacant. The homeowner vacancy rate was 1.4% and the rental vacancy rate was 4.1%.

Racial composition as of the 2020 census
Race	Number	Percent
White	16,179	37.0%
Black or African American	12,228	28.0%
American Indian and Alaska Native	225	0.5%
Asian	1,525	3.5%
Native Hawaiian and Other Pacific Islander	18	0.0%
Some other race	7,729	17.7%
Two or more races	5,834	13.3%
Hispanic or Latino (of any race)	15,055	34.4%

=== 2010 census ===
Largest ancestries (2010)	Percent
Polish	15.2%
Italian	8.8%
Irish	6.8%
German	5.4%
American	3.2%
Portuguese	2.7%

The 2010 United States census counted 40,499 people, 14,909 households, and 10,272 families in the city. The population density was 3,793.8 per square mile (1,464.8/km^{2}). There were 15,872 housing units at an average density of 1,486.8 per square mile (574.1/km^{2}). The racial makeup was 59.15% (23,957) White, 26.88% (10,888) Black or African American, 0.29% (118) Native American, 2.71% (1,099) Asian, 0.02% (8) Pacific Islander, 7.57% (3,066) from other races, and 3.37% (1,363) from two or more races. Hispanic or Latino of any race were 24.93% (10,095) of the population.

Of the 14,909 households, 29.9% had children under the age of 18; 45.1% were married couples living together; 17.6% had a female householder with no husband present and 31.1% were non-families. Of all households, 26.2% were made up of individuals and 11.0% had someone living alone who was 65 years of age or older. The average household size was 2.70 and the average family size was 3.27.

21.8% of the population were under the age of 18, 9.2% from 18 to 24, 28.0% from 25 to 44, 27.6% from 45 to 64, and 13.4% who were 65 years of age or older. The median age was 38.8 years. For every 100 females, the population had 91.1 males. For every 100 females ages 18 and older there were 87.7 males.

The Census Bureau's 2006–2010 American Community Survey shows that (in 2010 inflation-adjusted dollars) median household income was $55,859 (with a margin of error of +/− $2,529) and the median family income was $64,439 (+/− $4,027). Males had a median income of $45,890 (+/− $3,397) versus $39,288 (+/− $2,842) for females. The per capita income for the borough was $27,011 (+/− $1,161). About 5.9% of families and 7.5% of the population were below the poverty line, including 12.1% of those under age 18 and 8.1% of those age 65 or over.

=== 2000 census ===
Largest ancestries (2000)	Percent
Polish	18.0%
Italian	10.3%
Irish	9.0%
German	6.8%
Portuguese	3.1%
English	2.7%

As of the 2000 United States census there were 39,394 people, 15,052 households, and 10,084 families residing in the city. The population density was 3,645.5 inhabitants per square mile (1,407.5/km^{2}). There were 15,567 housing units at an average density of 1,440.6 per square mile (556.2/km^{2}). The racial makeup of the city was 66.08% White, 22.80% African American, 0.14% Native American, 2.35% Asian, 0.04% Pacific Islander, 4.88% from other races, and 3.71% from two or more races. Hispanic or Latino of any race were 14.40% of the population.

There were 15,052 households, out of which 29.0% had children under the age of 18 living with them, 46.7% were married couples living together, 15.3% had a female householder with no husband present, and 33.0% were non-families. 27.9% of all households were made up of individuals, and 13.6% had someone living alone who was 65 years of age or older. The average household size was 2.60 and the average family size was 3.21.

In the city the population was spread out, with 22.5% under the age of 18, 8.2% from 18 to 24, 30.4% from 25 to 44, 22.7% from 45 to 64, and 16.3% who were 65 years of age or older. The median age was 38 years. For every 100 females, there were 90.4 males. For every 100 females age 18 and over, there were 85.2 males.

The median income for a household in the city was $46,345, and the median income for a family was $54,903. Males had a median income of $39,457 versus $30,395 for females. The per capita income for the city was $21,314. About 5.0% of families and 6.4% of the population were below the poverty line, including 8.1% of those under age 18 and 7.8% of those age 65 or over.

== Economy ==
The east side of Linden is located along the Arthur Kill, a navigable strait which plays an important role in bulk cargo transportation in the Port of New York and New Jersey.

Linden is home to the Bayway Refinery, a Phillips 66 refining facility that helps supply petroleum-based products to the New York/New Jersey area, producing approximately 230,000 barrels per day (37,000 m^{3}/d), making it the second-largest on the East Coast of the United States and one of the country's 25 largest facilities.

From 1937 to 2005, Linden was home to Linden Assembly, a General Motors manufacturing plant that produced Oldsmobile, Pontiac, Buick and other GM automobiles, but also produced planes during World War II. By early 2008 most of the plant has been torn down for redevelopment by Duke Realty Corporation, which purchased the 100 acres (40 ha) site for $76.5 million.

Linden, together with Rahway, is home to Merck & Co., one of the world's leading pharmaceutical companies. In 2003, the pharmaceutical company celebrated 100 years in Rahway and Linden.

== Sunnyside section of Linden and the Jewish community ==
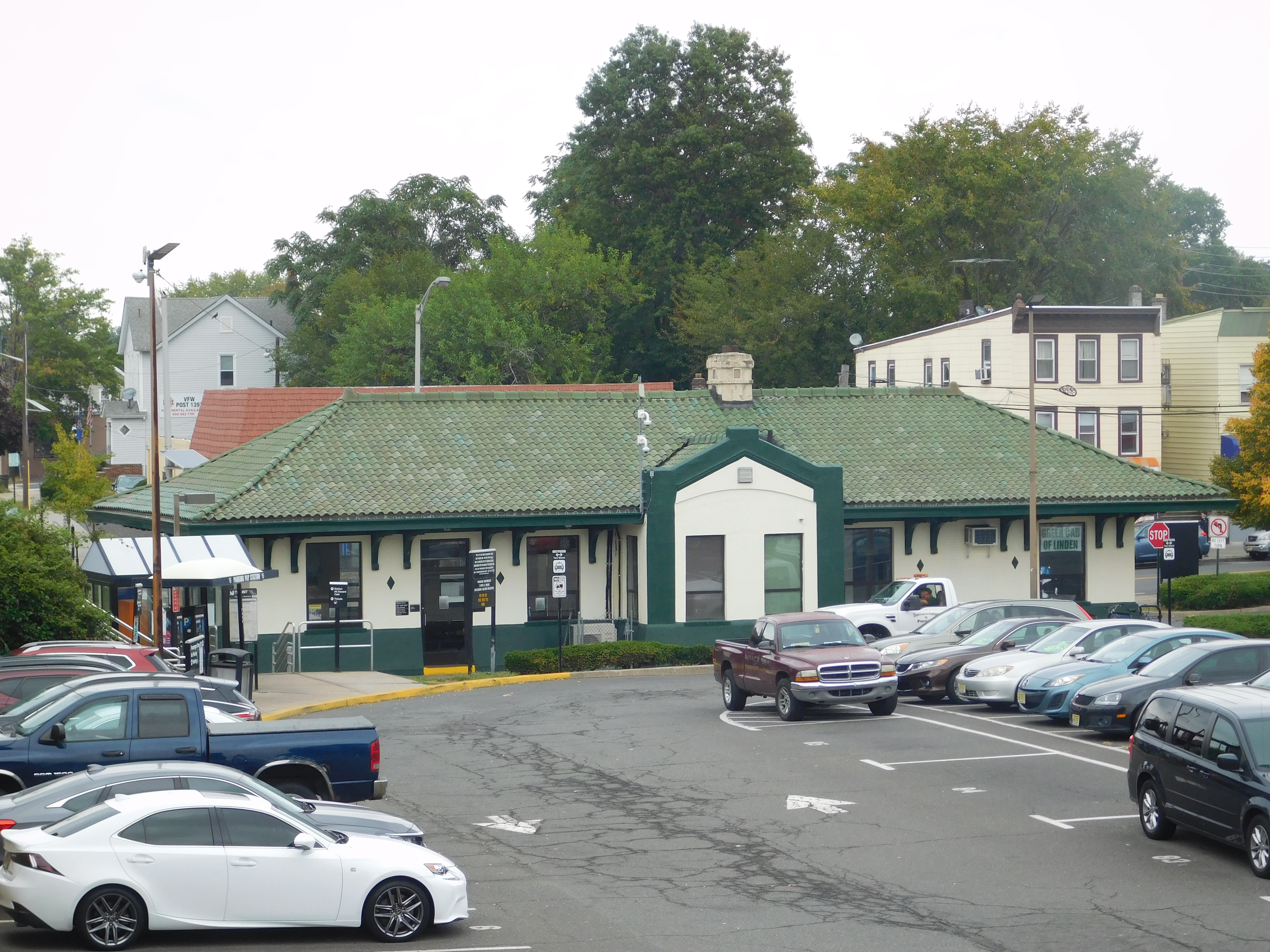
Linden station offers direct trains to Manhattan

The residential area of Linden west of St. Georges Avenue is known as Sunnyside, named for the former Sunnyfield Golf Club located in that area. It borders on Clark, Cranford and Winfield on the west and Roselle on the east.

=== Jewish community of Linden ===
Like the rest of Linden, Sunnyside is a diverse neighborhood featuring residents of many different backgrounds. Congregation Anshe Chesed is a Modern Orthodox synagogue in the Sunnyside section that was founded in 1914. It has a large modern building on St. Georges Avenue and its former synagogue building on Blancke Street was converted for use for community athletics.

Among the parks in the Sunnyside section is Sunnyside Park, at the corner of Summit Terrace and Edgewood Road, dubbed the “Shabbos park” by the area's Modern Orthodox community as a place where families meet on Saturday afternoons.

An eruv links the Sunnyside section of Linden to Roselle, Warinanco Park, the Jewish Educational Center of Elizabeth, and Hillside. A mikveh was constructed in 2015.

Following the move in 2017 of members of the Koson congregation to the Sunnyside section of Linden, other Hasidic communities have grown in Linden, including Bobov, Rachmastrivka, Pupa, and Satmar communities, with 700 families living in the area in 2025.

In addition to rules greatly expanding the minimum lot size for houses of worship, the city enacted zoning restrictions in 2025 limiting use of basements for a bedroom, kitchen and bathroom, as well as requiring driveways, which were perceived to have a disproportionate impact on the growing number of large Haredi families in the area.

== Other houses of worship ==
=== Roman Catholic churches ===
The Roman Catholic parish St. Theresa of the Child Jesus Parish (131 East Edgar Road) was established in 1925 to serve Linden’s Catholic population and has long been associated with the city’s robust Polish‑American community. It is part of the Roman Catholic Archdiocese of Newark and is named for Theresa of Lisieux, a French Carmelite nun canonized for her spirituality of “the little way.” The parish offers regular Masses in Polish.

The Catholic parish St. Elizabeth of Hungary Parish (220 East Blanke Street, near Hussa Street) was founded and built in 1912 to serve the expanding Catholic community in Linden. It is part of the Roman Catholic Archdiocese of Newark and is named for Elizabeth of Hungary, a 13th century saint revered for her charity toward the poor.

The Roman Catholic parish Holy Family Church (210 Monroe Street) was established in 1955. It is part of the Roman Catholic Archdiocese of Newark and is named for the Holy Family, the family of Jesus, Mary, and Joseph.

St. John the Apostle Parish (1805 Penbrook Terrace) is part of the Roman Catholic Archdiocese of Newark and is named for John the Apostle, one of the twelve apostles of Jesus.

=== Other denominations ===
St. George (Byzantine) (417 McCandless Street) serves a Byzantine Rite Catholic community in Linden.

The United Methodist Church of Linden (321 North Wood Avenue) serves Methodist Christians in the city and takes its name from the Methodist tradition, a Protestant movement emphasizing personal faith and social holiness.

Grace Episcopal Church (2018 Dewitt Terrace) is a parish of the Episcopal Church in the United States, drawing its heritage from the Anglican tradition.

The Reformed Church of Linden (600 North Wood Avenue) reflects Protestant Reformation roots and covenantal theology.

St. Mary’s Orthodox Church (45 East Elm Street) serves members of the Malankara Orthodox Syrian Church tradition; it is named for Mary, mother of Jesus.

== Local media ==
Linden media includes:

- Union News Daily. A news outlet covering Union County news, it has a dedicated Linden section. It is part of LocalSource and published by Worrall Community Newspapers of Union.
- TAPinto Linden is a local digital news site covering Linden news exclusively, part of the TAPinto network of news in Central and Northern New Jersey.
- Life in Linden is published by Renna Media, located on Walnut Street in Cranford, NJ.
- LindenTV is the city's own channel, and is available to cable and Verizon FiOS television subscribers.
- The City of Linden shares news and events via its official website.
- Remaining multi-community newspapers include the Courier News, a daily newspaper based in Bridgewater Township, and The Star-Ledger and the Suburban News based in Newark.
- Linden is the official city of license for WNJU (channel 47), a television station serving the New York metropolitan area as the flagship station of the Spanish-language Telemundo network.

== Parks and recreation ==
- Hawk Rise Sanctuary is a bird sanctuary created by the City of Linden and the New Jersey Audubon Society on the banks of the Rahway River at the lower reaches of the Rahway River Parkway.
- John Russell Wheeler Park is home to the Linden Skatepark for skateboarders at Winans Avenue and West Edgar Road near where Morses Creek winds through the park. an 11,000-square-foot (1,000 m^{2}) spray park opened in 2019, replacing a pool that dated back to 1931.
- Peach Orchard Park sits at Dill Avenue, Hussa Street and Cranford Avenue, behind School #4. It is home to Peach Orchard Brook, a tributary of Morses Creek.
- Warinanco Park's Park Drive entrance connects the park to Linden.
- Memorial Park between Wood Avenue & Lower Road, home to the new Linden Skatepark after the one at John Russell Wheeler Park was removed.

== Government ==
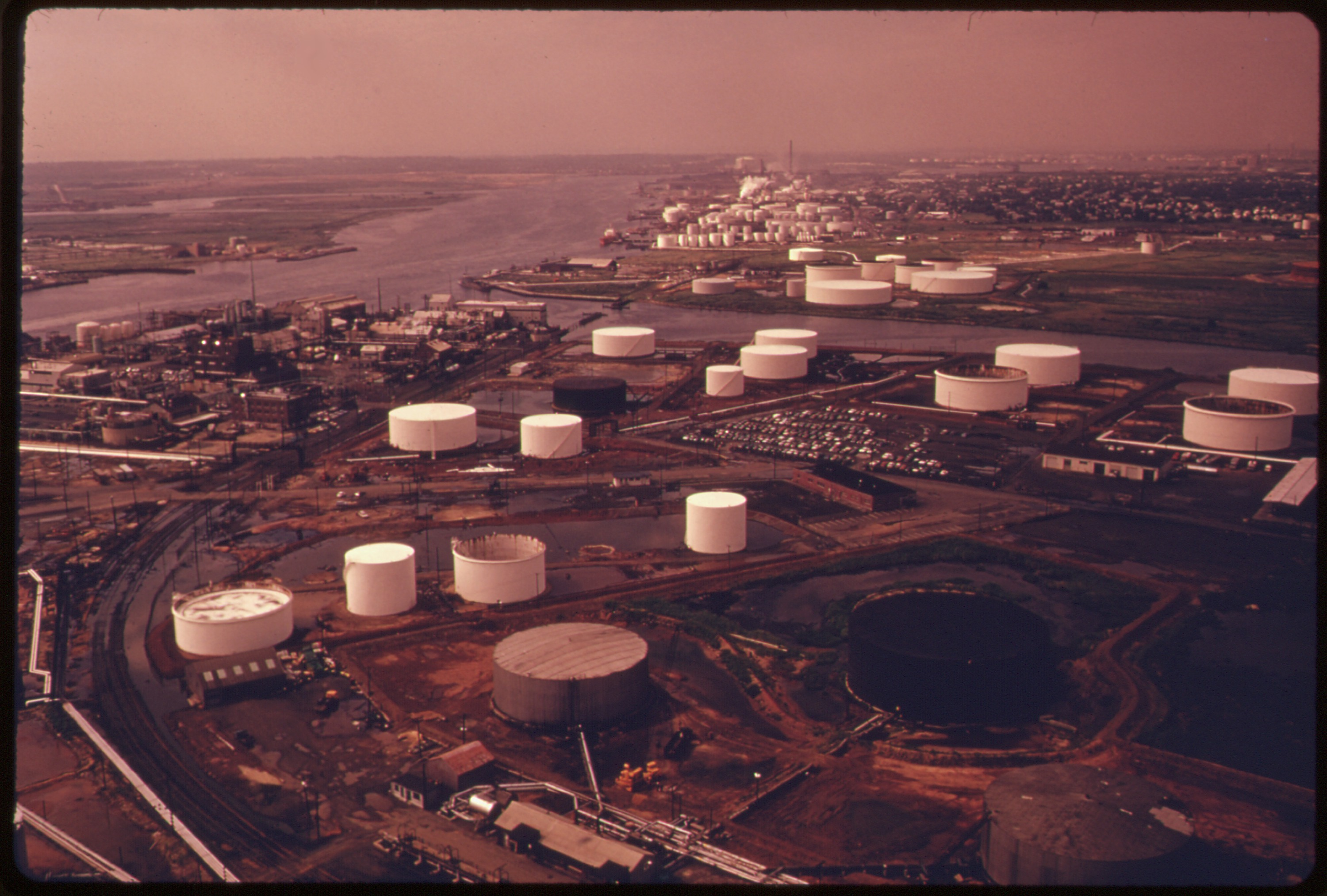
Linden, New Jersey (1974)

=== Local government ===
Linden is governed under the City form of government. The city is one of 15 (of the 564) municipalities statewide that use this traditional form of municipal government. The governing body is comprised of the mayor and an 11-member City Council. The mayor and council president are elected at-large to four-year terms of office, while the other 10 members are elected from wards to three-year terms of office on a staggered basis, with either two or four of the ward seats up for election each year in a three-year cycle.

As of 2026, the Mayor of Linden is Democrat Derek Armstead, whose term of office ends December 31, 2026. Members of the City Council are:

- Council President – Michele Yamakaitis (D, 2026)
- First Ward – Lisa A. Ormon (D, 2027)
- Second Ward – Barry E. Javick (D, 2028)
- Third Ward – Monique Caldwell (D, 2028)
- Fourth Ward – Alfred Mohammed (D, 2026)
- Fifth Ward – Kayla Lott (D, 2028)
- Sixth Ward – Eloy Delgado (D, 2026)
- Seventh Ward – Ralph Strano (D, 2028)
- Eighth Ward – Mark Armstead (D, 2026)
- Ninth Ward – Alfred Rodriguez (D, 2027)
- Tenth Ward – Christine Ann Hudak (D, 2026)

In June 2022, Christine Ann Hudak was appointed to fill the 10th Ward seat that had become vacant following the resignation of Gretchen M. Hickey. Hudak served on an interim basis until the November 2022 general election when she was elected to serve the remainder of the term of office.

The 8th Ward seat expiring in December 2020 became vacant in January 2019 when Michele Yamakaitis took office as Council President. The Democratic municipal committee chose Paul Coates to fill the vacancy, but Mayor Derek Armstead sought to keep the seat vacant until the November 2019 general election. After a legal battle waged by the Linden Democratic municipal committee and its chairman Nicholas Scutari, a Superior Court judge ruled in May 2019 that Coates should be immediately seated to the council to serve until the November general election. In the November 2019 voting, Garret Blaine was elected to serve the balance of the term of office.

In November 2015, the City Council selected Ralph Strano from a list of three candidates nominated by the Democratic municipal committee to fill the Seventh Ward seat expiring in December 2016 that had been held by Mike Minarchenko until his resignation from office the previous month; Strano served on an interim basis until the November 2016 general election, when he was elected to serve the balance of the term of office.

John T. Gregorio, served as mayor of Linden for 30 non-consecutive years until December 31, 2006, and was repeatedly tagged with scandal during his mayoral career, including one felony conviction, later pardoned, which forced him from office for two terms. Gregorio returned as mayor following his conviction.

Rhashonna Cosby-Hurling became the first African American female elected to the City Council when she took office in 2011 to represent the Fifth Ward.

=== Federal, state, and county representation ===
Linden is located in the 7th and 10th Congressional Districts and is part of New Jersey's 22nd state legislative district.

Prior to the 2010 Census, Linden had been split between the 7th Congressional District, the 10th Congressional District and the 13th Congressional District, a change made by the New Jersey Redistricting Commission that took effect in January 2013, based on the results of the November 2012 general elections.

For the 119th United States Congress, New Jersey's 7th congressional district is represented by Thomas Kean Jr. (R, Westfield). For the 119th United States Congress, New Jersey's 10th congressional district is represented by LaMonica McIver (D, Newark). New Jersey is represented in the United States Senate by Democrats Cory Booker (Newark, term ends 2027) and Andy Kim (Moorestown, term ends 2031).

For the 2026–2027 session, the 22nd legislative district of the New Jersey Legislature is represented in the State Senate by Nicholas Scutari (D, Linden) and in the General Assembly by Linda S. Carter (D, Plainfield) and James J. Kennedy (D, Rahway).

Union County is governed by a Board of County Commissioners, whose nine members are elected at-large to three-year terms of office on a staggered basis with three seats coming up for election each year, with an appointed County Manager overseeing the day-to-day operations of the county. At an annual reorganization meeting held in the beginning of January, the board selects a Chair and Vice Chair from among its members. As of 2026, Union County's County Commissioners are:

Vice Chair Rebecca Williams (D, Plainfield, 2028), Chairman Joesph Bodek (D, Linden, 2026), James E. Baker Jr. (D, Rahway, 2027), Michele Delisfort (D, Union Township, 2026), Lourdes M. Leon (D, Elizabeth, 2026), Alexander Mirabella (D, Fanwood, 2027) Kimberly Palmieri-Mouded (D, Westfield, 2027). Stanley J. Neron (D, Elizabeth, 2028), Joseph Signorello III (D, Roselle Park, 2028)

Constitutional officers elected on a countywide basis are: Clerk Vacant - Incumbent Clerk Joanne Rajoppi (D, Union Township) died on July 16, 2026. Her death triggered a special election for a full five-year term to be held concurrently with the November 2026 general election. Deputy Clerk Clara Fernández assumes the powers of the office until the vacancy is filled. Sheriff Peter Corvelli (D, Kenilworth, 2026) and Surrogate Christopher E. Hudak (D, Clark, 2027).

=== Politics ===
As of March 2011, there were a total of 21,494 registered voters in Linden, of which 11,831 (55.0% vs. 41.8% countywide) were registered as Democrats, 1,319 (6.1% vs. 15.3%) were registered as Republicans and 8,339 (38.8% vs. 42.9%) were registered as Unaffiliated. There were 5 voters registered as Libertarians or Greens. Among the city's 2010 Census population, 53.1% (vs. 53.3% in Union County) were registered to vote, including 67.9% of those ages 18 and over (vs. 70.6% countywide).

United States presidential election results for Linden
Year	Republican		Democratic		Third party(ies)	
Year	No.	%	No.	%	No.	%
2024	6,404	38.37%	9,996	59.90%	288	1.73%
2020	5,700	30.95%	12,554	68.16%	165	0.90%
2016	4,625	28.76%	11,095	68.99%	362	2.25%
2012	3,814	25.15%	11,213	73.95%	135	0.89%
2008	5,037	31.63%	10,728	67.36%	162	1.02%
2004	4,966	34.72%	9,222	64.47%	116	0.81%

In the 2012 presidential election, Democrat Barack Obama received 11,213 votes (73.3% vs. 66.0% countywide), ahead of Republican Mitt Romney with 3,814 votes (24.9% vs. 32.3%) and other candidates with 135 votes (0.9% vs. 0.8%), among the 15,303 ballots cast by the city's 22,753 registered voters, for a turnout of 67.3% (vs. 68.8% in Union County). In the 2008 presidential election, Democrat Barack Obama received 10,728 votes (66.5% vs. 63.1% countywide), ahead of Republican John McCain with 5,037 votes (31.2% vs. 35.2%) and other candidates with 162 votes (1.0% vs. 0.9%), among the 16,142 ballots cast by the city's 22,266 registered voters, for a turnout of 72.5% (vs. 74.7% in Union County). In the 2004 presidential election, Democrat John Kerry received 9,222 votes (64.0% vs. 58.3% countywide), ahead of Republican George W. Bush with 4,966 votes (34.4% vs. 40.3%) and other candidates with 116 votes (0.8% vs. 0.7%), among the 14,419 ballots cast by the city's 20,596 registered voters, for a turnout of 70.0% (vs. 72.3% in the whole county).

Gubernatorial election results for Linden
Year	Republican		Democratic		Third party(ies)	
Year	No.	%	No.	%	No.	%
2025	3,502	29.09%	8,443	70.12%	95	0.79%
2021	2,929	35.48%	5,236	63.42%	91	1.10%
2017	2,021	25.69%	5,665	72.02%	180	2.29%
2013	3,420	43.86%	4,255	54.57%	123	1.58%
2009	3,272	35.37%	5,429	58.69%	550	5.95%
2005	2,631	28.24%	6,351	68.18%	333	3.57%

In the 2017 gubernatorial election, Democrat Phil Murphy received 5,665 votes (72.0% vs. 65.2% countywide), ahead of Republican Kim Guadagno with 2,021 votes (25.7% vs. 32.6%), and other candidates with 180 votes (2.3% vs. 2.1%), among the 8,195 ballots cast by the city's 24,699 registered voters, for a turnout of 33.2%. In the 2013 gubernatorial election, Democrat Barbara Buono received 54.6% of the vote (4,255 cast), ahead of Republican Chris Christie with 43.9% (3,420 votes), and other candidates with 1.6% (123 votes), among the 8,158 ballots cast by the city's 22,416 registered voters (360 ballots were spoiled), for a turnout of 36.4%. In the 2009 gubernatorial election, Democrat Jon Corzine received 5,429 ballots cast (57.8% vs. 50.6% countywide), ahead of Republican Chris Christie with 3,272 votes (34.8% vs. 41.7%), Independent Chris Daggett with 452 votes (4.8% vs. 5.9%) and other candidates with 98 votes (1.0% vs. 0.8%), among the 9,390 ballots cast by the city's 21,742 registered voters, yielding a 43.2% turnout (vs. 46.5% in the county).

United States Senate election results for Linden1
Year	Republican		Democratic		Third party(ies)	
Year	No.	%	No.	%	No.	%
2024	4,986	33.83%	9,337	63.36%	414	2.81%
2018	3,022	24.99%	8,075	66.78%	995	8.23%
2012	2,966	22.48%	9,989	75.72%	237	1.80%
2006	2,983	30.68%	6,305	64.85%	434	4.46%

United States Senate election results for Linden2
Year	Republican		Democratic		Third party(ies)	
Year	No.	%	No.	%	No.	%
2020	4,725	26.49%	12,697	71.18%	416	2.33%
2014	1,821	23.11%	5,790	73.48%	269	3.41%
2013	1,543	30.43%	3,457	68.19%	70	1.38%
2008	3,587	28.14%	8,812	69.12%	349	2.74%

== Education ==
=== Public schools ===
The Linden Public Schools serve students in pre-kindergarten through twelfth grade. As of the 2022–23 school year, the district, comprised of 11 schools, had an enrollment of 6,125 students and 557.0 classroom teachers (on an FTE basis), for a student–teacher ratio of 11.0:1. Schools in the district (with 2022–23 enrollment data from the National Center for Education Statistics) are School No. 1 (with 374 students; in grades PreK–5), School No. 2 (584; PreK–5), School No. 4 (437; PreK–5), School No. 5 (290; PreK–5), School No. 6 (332; PreK–5), School No. 8 (300; PreK–5), School No. 9 (324; PreK–5), School No. 10 (242; PreK–5), Myles J. McManus Middle School (696; 6–8), Joseph E. Soehl Middle School (662; 6–8) and Linden High School (1,801; 9–12). School No. 5 was one of nine schools in New Jersey honored in 2020 by the National Blue Ribbon Schools Program, which recognizes high student achievement.

=== Private schools ===
Sinai Christian Academy serves grades Pre-K through 12th grade.

Saints Mary and Elizabeth Academy was a Catholic school serving students in Pre-K through 8th grade that operated under the auspices of the Roman Catholic Archdiocese of Newark until its closure at the end of the 2013–2014 school year due to declining enrollment.

== Transportation ==
=== Roads and highways ===
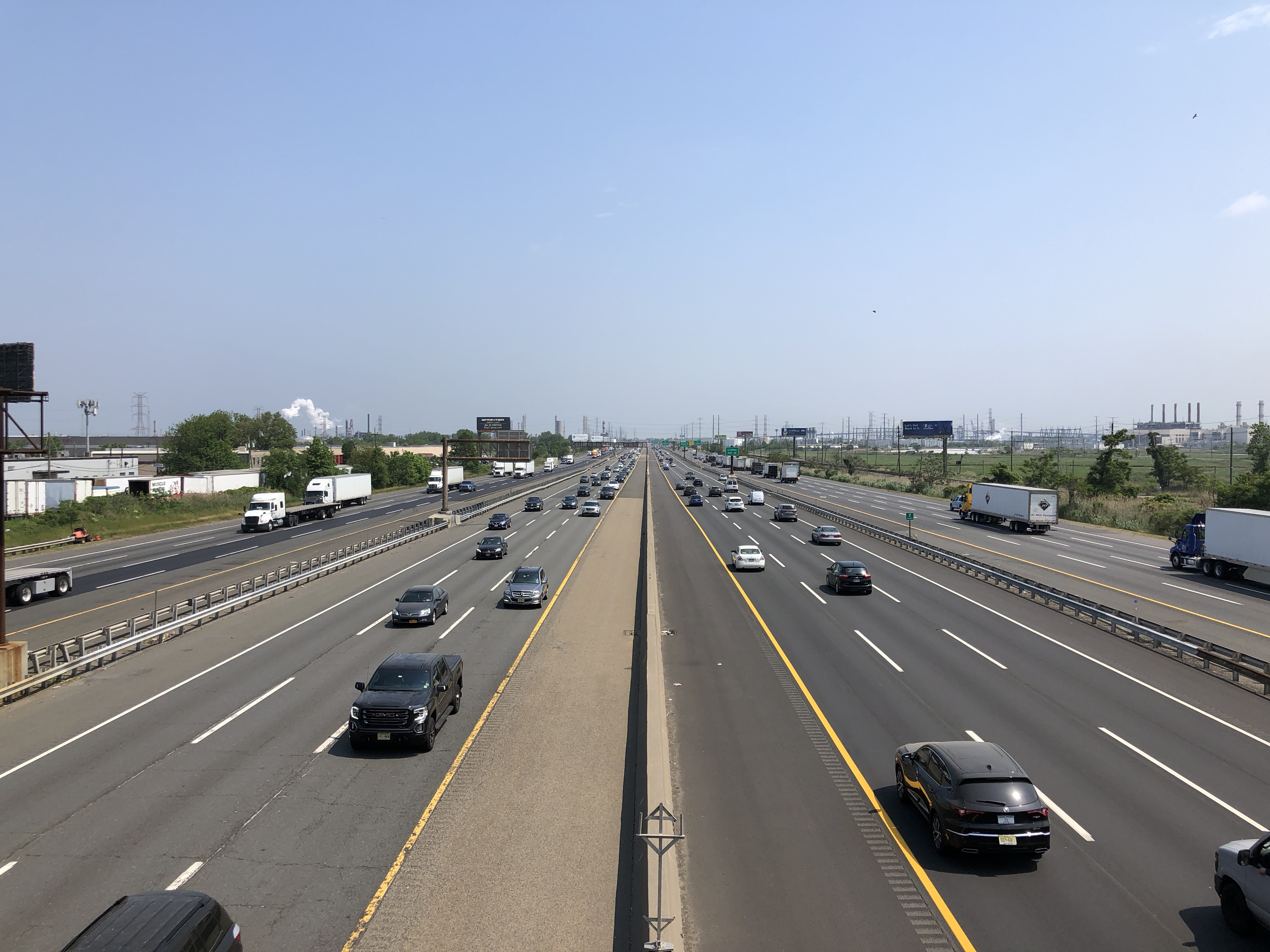
The New Jersey Turnpike (Interstate 95) northbound in Linden

As of May 2010, the city had a total of 109.72 miles (176.58 km) of roadways, of which 87.01 miles (140.03 km) were maintained by the municipality, 13.53 miles (21.77 km) by Union County, 6.19 miles (9.96 km) by the New Jersey Department of Transportation and 2.99 miles (4.81 km) by the New Jersey Turnpike Authority.

The New Jersey Turnpike (Interstate 95) passes through the eastern portion of the city, with a few ramps that lead to the nearest exit (Exit 13 for I-278) which is on the border with nearby Elizabeth. The city is also the western terminus of Interstate 278, which travels through all five boroughs of New York City. Other major roadways in the city are U.S. Route 1/9 and Route 27. The Garden State Parkway passes about 500 feet (150 m) west of the city limits.

=== Public transportation ===
==== Bus ====
Local public transportation is provided by NJ Transit with bus service to Elizabeth, Perth Amboy and Newark. NJ Transit routes 112 and 115 provide local service and interstate service to the Port Authority Bus Terminal in New York City, on the 48 to Elizabeth and 94 routes to Newark, and local service on the 56 and 57 routes.

==== Rail ====
The Linden train station offers a one-seat ride to Manhattan in 39 minutes via service on NJ Transit's North Jersey Coast Line and the Northeast Corridor Line. Trains travel northbound to Newark Penn Station, Secaucus Junction and New York Penn Station, and southbound towards the Trenton Transit Center, with connections available at those locations

=== Airport ===
Linden Airport is a small general aviation facility and reliever airport located on the eastern side of the city along U.S. Route 1/9. The airport was constructed for the United States Navy in 1942 for use in development and testing of the Grumman F4F Wildcat and was taken over by the city of Linden after World War II. The airport served as a road racing course in June 1954 for a race in the then-NASCAR Grand National Division (now known as the Monster Energy NASCAR Cup Series), with Al Keller winning the 50-lap race over a 2 miles (3.2 km) course.

Newark Liberty International Airport is approximately 15 minutes away.

== Arts and culture ==
- Raymond Wood Bauer Promenade is the home of outdoor concerts and other performing arts in Linden. Live bands play R&B, funk and jazz at several live performance venues, and late R&B and jazz vocalist Linda Hayes, who played with the well-known Platters (of which her brother was lead singer) was from Linden.
- Catholic-born artist Thomas Lanigan-Schmidt grew up in poverty in 1950s and 1960s Linden. Openly gay, he recently had a career retrospective on his exploration of "gay sexuality, class struggle, and religion" in his art at MoMA PS1, and is also known for being photographed as a youth at the Stonewall Riots. Lanigan-Schmidt worked as a 1960s Linden youth doing "odd jobs to help support his family and was bullied by high school thugs," moving to New York City as a young man. As a child in 1950s Linden, after Lanigan-Schmidt was assigned to decorate the school bulletin board in his Catholic elementary school, he built a detailed model of a church altar. The impressive model was featured in a local paper while Lanigan-Schmidt was a student at St. Elizabeth School at 170 Hussa Street. The school closed in 2014; it is a part of the campus of St. Elizabeth of Hungary Roman Catholic Church in Linden.
- One of the artists from New Jersey hardcore (now LA-based) punk hip-hop group Ho99o9 (pronounced "Horror"), theOGM, has Linden roots.
- 1910 Fruitgum Company, a bubblegum pop band from the 1960s, was formed by five Linden residents.
- De Luxe Records (later DeLuxe Records) was a record company and label formed in 1944 in Linden, New Jersey, and is known for its famed R&B and early rock recordings.
- In the mid-20th century, Linden was the headquarters for the Regal Records, as well as the budget record label Springboard International Records later in the century. Transco, before acquisition by Apollo, made sound recording industry acetate discs (also called acetate blanks, dubplates or lacquers) out of Linden.
- The Linden Cultural and Heritage Committee exists to bring entertainment events to area residents such as craft bazaars, street fairs, concerts, and plays, and the Linden Society for Historic Preservation works to preserve the history of the city.
- Linden was chosen as the primary filming location for Volume 2 of the streetball video series, AND1 Mixtapes. One of the original five streetballers to sign with AND1, Waliyy Dixon, a Linden native who also goes by the nickname "Main Event," helped host a night of basketball at 4th Ward Park that claimed attendance by 2,000 spectators.
- Several scenes from the 2008 Mickey Rourke film The Wrestler, later nominated for several Academy Awards, were filmed in Linden.
- Hal Linden, the stage and screen actor, television director and musician best known as the star of the ABC TV series Barney Miller, chose his stage name after seeing the word "Linden" on a water tower while heading from Philadelphia to perform in New York City.

== Notable people ==
People who were born in, residents of, or otherwise closely associated with Linden include:

- Amelia Brodka (born 1989), Olympic athlete and professional skateboarder
- Deidre Davis Butler (1955–2020), lawyer, disability rights activist and federal official
- Kevin Carolan (born 1968), actor and comedian
- Roger Chanoine (1976–2016), offensive tackle who played in the NFL between 1998 and 2002, primarily for the Cleveland Browns
- John Charles (1944–2019), former cornerback and safety who played eight seasons in the National Football League
- Nick Christiani (born 1987), former baseball pitcher who played for the Cincinnati Reds
- Jerome A. Cohen (1930–2025), professor of law at New York University School of Law and an expert in Chinese law
- George Thomas Coker (born 1943), United States Navy navigator who spent over six years as a POW after being shot down over North Vietnam in 1966
- Danny Dias (c. 1983–2017), activist and reality television personality who starred on season 13 on MTV's Road Rules, Road Rules: X-Treme, in 2004
- Tamecka Dixon (born 1975), professional basketball player who played for 13 seasons in the WNBA
- Waliyy Dixon (born 1974), a.k.a. "Main Event" on the AND1 Mixtape Tour; one of the original players on the famous AND1-sponsored streetball tours
- Carolyn Dorin-Ballard (born 1964), professional bowler and TV bowling analyst, USBC Hall of Famer
- Cathy Dorin-Lizzi (born 1966), professional bowler and TV bowling analyst, sister of Carolyn
- Calvin Duncan (born 1961), pastor and former professional basketball player who was selected by the Cleveland Cavaliers in the second round (30th pick overall) of 1985 NBA draft
- John T. Gregorio (1928−2013), politician who served as mayor of Linden, in the New Jersey General Assembly from 1976 to 1978 and in the New Jersey Senate from 1978 to 1983
- Linda Hayes (1923–1998; née Bertha Williams), jazz and R&B singer
- George Hudak (1935–1996), politician who represented the 20th Legislative District in the New Jersey General Assembly from 1986 to 1994 and was mayor of Linden from 1983 to 1987
- Eddie Kasko (1931–2020), infielder, manager, scout and front office executive in Major League Baseball
- Thomas Lanigan-Schmidt (born 1948), artist and veteran of the Stonewall riots
- Otis Livingston II (born 1996), professional basketball player who plays for Bàsquet Girona of the Spanish Liga ACB
- Mike Nardi (born 1985), basketball player who has played for Scavolini Spar Pesaro in the Italian League – Serie A
- Vincent Obsitnik (born 1938), Ambassador Extraordinary and Plenipotentiary of the United States of America to the Slovak Republic
- Mike Pringley (born 1976), former American football defensive end who played in the NFL for the Detroit Lions and San Diego Chargers
- Giovanni Riggi (1925–2015), mobster and member of the DeCavalcante crime family since the 1940s
- Jon Rua (born 1983), actor, singer and choreographer who appeared in the Broadway hit Hamilton
- Nicholas Scutari (born 1968), politician, who has been serving in the New Jersey Senate since 2004, where he represents the 22nd Legislative District
- Danny Stiles (1923–2011), radio personality at WNYC, WNSW, WJDM and WPAT in the New York City market
- Troy Stradford (born 1964), former running back who played for six seasons in the NFL
- Joseph Suliga (1958–2005), former member of the New Jersey Senate who was the youngest person ever elected to the Linden Public Schools Board of Education, at the age of 19
- Craig Taylor (born 1966), former running back for the Cincinnati Bengals
- Chester A. Weidenburner (1913–1985), lawyer and judge who served as U.S. Attorney for the District of New Jersey and as a Judge of the New Jersey Superior Court
- Muhammad Wilkerson (born 1989), defensive end who has played for the New York Jets
- Robert Zarinsky (1940–2008), convicted murderer and suspected serial killer
