= Neil M. Cohen =

American politician from New Jersey (born 1951)

Member of the New Jersey General Assembly
- In office January 11, 1994 – July 28, 2008 Serving with Joseph Suliga and Joseph Cryan
- Preceded by: Thomas G. Dunn; George Hudak
- Succeeded by: Annette Quijano
- Constituency: 20th District
- In office January 9, 1990 – January 14, 1992 Serving with Chuck Hardwick
- Preceded by: Peter J. Genova
- Succeeded by: Monroe Jay Lustbader; Maureen Ogden
- Constituency: 21st District

Personal details
- Born: February 11, 1951 (age 75) Newark, New Jersey
- Party: Democratic

Neil M. Cohen (born February 11, 1951) is an American Democratic Party politician, who served in the New Jersey General Assembly from 1994 to 2008 where he represented the 20th Legislative District. He had also served in the Assembly from the 21st District from 1990 to 1992.

Cohen resigned from the legislature abruptly in 2008 amidst an investigation into his possession of child pornography. Facing up to thirty years in prison, he pleaded guilty to a lesser charge of child endangerment through distribution of pornography and was sentenced to only five years. He served two before his release on parole in 2012.

== Early life ==
Cohen was born in Newark, New Jersey. He is Jewish and has been a resident of Roselle, New Jersey. He received a B.A. from Athens College (now Athens State University) in History and was awarded a J.D. from the Howard University.

== Career ==
Cohen served in the Assembly as Deputy Majority Leader from 2002 until his resignation, was the Deputy Minority Leader from 1996–2001 and was Minority Whip from 1994–1995.

Cohen served in the Assembly on the Financial Institutions and Insurance Committee (as Chair) and the Labor Committee. As Assemblyman, Cohen sponsored measures establishing Vietnam Veterans Remembrance Day and Holocaust Remembrance Day programs in New Jersey. He was the co-sponsor of a ban on semi-automatic firearms enacted by the Administration of Governor of New Jersey James Florio, and was one of only three Democrats to oppose the Florio Administration's income tax increase.

Cohen served on the Union County Board of Chosen Freeholders from 1988 to 1990. He is an attorney with the firm of Gill & Cohen, P.C. together with fellow Assemblywoman Nia Gill of the 34th Legislative District. Cohen was an aide in 1976 to the Deputy Commissioner of the New Jersey Department of Environmental Protection. From 1979–1981, he was a trial attorney in the Office of the Public Defender.

== Sex offenses ==
Cohen was hospitalized and placed in psychiatric care on July 24, 2008, after investigators from the New Jersey Attorney General's office removed a state-issued computer from his legislative office following allegations the computer had been used to store child pornography. State Senator Raymond Lesniak and Assemblyman Joseph Cryan, who represent the same district and share a common office in Union Township, notified authorities after staffers had discovered the material on the computer in question.

Cohen resigned from the General Assembly on July 28, 2008, submitting a one-sentence letter of resignation stating "Please accept this letter as my formal resignation from the General Assembly of the State of New Jersey, effective immediately", and offering no explanation for his actions. The resignation was accepted at once by Assembly Speaker Joseph J. Roberts. Democratic committee members from the district selected Annette Quijano to fill Cohen's vacancy.

Cohen was indicted for official misconduct (2nd degree), reproduction of child pornography (2nd degree), distribution of child pornography (2nd degree), and possession of child pornography (4th degree). In a plea agreement, the state dropped the official misconduct charge and three of four child pornography counts, and on April 12, 2010, Cohen pleaded guilty to the charge of endangering the welfare of a child by distributing child pornography. With the possibility of up to 30 years imprisonment, State Attorney General Paula Dow sought a five-year prison term for Cohen, as well his disbarment. He was sentenced to five years and was incarcerated from November 4, 2010, until January 4, 2012, when he was released on parole.

== Electoral history ==
=== New Jersey General Assembly ===
21st Legislative District general election, 1991
Party	Candidate	Votes	%
Republican	Maureen Ogden	34,282	32.4
Republican	Monroe Jay Lustbader	33,914	32.06
Democratic	Neil M. Cohen (incumbent)	20,460	19.34
Democratic	Frank Covello	15,928	15.06
Populist	Bill Ciccone	1,212	1.15
Total votes		105,796	100
