= George Hudak =

American politician

Member of the New Jersey General Assembly from the 20th district
- In office January 14, 1986 – January 11, 1994 Serving with Thomas J. Deverin and Thomas G. Dunn
- Preceded by: Thomas W. Long
- Succeeded by: Neil M. Cohen; Joseph Suliga

Mayor of Linden, New Jersey
- In office 1983–1987
- Preceded by: John T. Gregorio
- Succeeded by: Paul Werkmeister

Personal details
- Born: March 10, 1935 Linden, New Jersey
- Died: November 4, 1996 (aged 61) Linden, New Jersey
- Party: Democratic
- Spouse: Vera Vircik
- Children: two

George Hudak (March 10, 1935 – November 4, 1996) was an American politician who served in the New Jersey General Assembly from the 20th Legislative District from 1986 to 1994 and as mayor of Linden, New Jersey from 1983 to 1987.

Born in Linden in 1935, he graduated from Linden High School and Newark State College (now Kean University) where he earned a degree in teaching. Following a stint in the U.S. Army during the Korean War from 1951 to 1953, he taught special education for the Old Bridge Township Public Schools for 18 years. In addition, Hudak owned a trophy shop in Avenel and was a baseball coach for Kean.

Hudak's first elected office was as a councilman in his hometown of Linden, elected in 1966. In 1979, he became the council president. Following the resignation of Linden mayor John T. Gregorio in 1983, Hudak became mayor and served for one term to 1987. During his time as mayor, he spearheaded the effort to pass federal legislation allowing for the transfer of Linden Airport to the city's control. In 1985, he was elected to the General Assembly from the 20th Legislative District encompassing southeastern Union County and Carteret where he served alongside Thomas J. Deverin. During his last term in the Assembly from 1992 to 1994, the 20th district only consisted of southeastern Union County and he served alongside Elizabeth mayor Thomas G. Dunn. He retired after the 1993 elections.

Hudak died at his Linden home of a heart attack on November 4, 1996.
