= Joseph Suliga =

American politician

Member of the New Jersey Senate from the 22nd district
- In office January 8, 2002 – January 13, 2004
- Preceded by: Donald DiFrancesco
- Succeeded by: Nicholas Scutari

Member of the New Jersey General Assembly from the 20th district
- In office January 11, 1994 – January 8, 2002 Serving with Neil M. Cohen
- Preceded by: Thomas G. Dunn; George Hudak
- Succeeded by: Joseph Cryan

Personal details
- Born: December 25, 1957 Elizabeth, New Jersey, U.S.
- Died: February 18, 2005 (aged 47) Linden, New Jersey, U.S.
- Party: Democratic

Joseph S. Suliga (December 25, 1957 – February 18, 2005) was an American Democratic Party politician, who served in the New Jersey State Senate, where he represented the 22nd Legislative District, until 2004. Suliga did not run for re-election in 2003 after a scandal involving his alleged drunken sexual harassment of a woman in Atlantic City, New Jersey. Instead he resigned and entered rehabilitation for alcoholism and was replaced on the ballot and in the Senate by fellow Linden Democrat Nicholas Scutari.

In 2005, Suliga was killed in an automobile accident in the parking lot of a Linden go-go bar. Governor Richard Codey ordered that flags be flown at half-staff in Suliga's honor. Suliga was sitting in the back seat of an Infiniti that had been illegally parked by his driver, Nicholas Sorrentino; the car's back was sticking out onto the street. The Infiniti was struck while Sorrentino and Suliga were inside and Joan Hannon was about to enter the vehicle, by an automobile driven by Omar Beeks. Beeks later testified that he had struck the Infiniti while trying to avoid hitting another vehicle. Hannon was thrown twenty feet and suffered cracked ribs and pelvis in addition to a broken ankle. In a civil trial, a jury found Sorrentino liable for the accident and awarded $621,410 to Suliga's widow, Annemarie Pakulski, as well as $150,000 to Hannon for her injuries. The jury did not find Beeks liable for the accident in any amount.

In the Senate, Suliga sponsored legislation requiring insurance coverage for mammograms to women over 35. He was co-chair of the Senate Environmental Committee and served as the second ranking Democrat on the Appropriations Committee.

Suliga started his career in elected office at the age of 19 as the youngest person ever elected to the Linden Public Schools Board of Education, while he was a student at Kean University, serving in office from 1977 to 1983. Later, he served on the Linden City Council from 1984 to 1988. Before his election the Senate, Suliga served in the New Jersey General Assembly, the lower house of the New Jersey Legislature, from 1994 to 2001 and was a member of the Union County Board of Chosen Freeholders from 1988 to 1990. He was the Linden City Treasurer at the time of his death.

Suliga received a B.A. from Kean University with a major in Political Science, and was granted a Master of Public Administration degree in 1993 from Kean University and earned an M.S. degree from Rutgers University in Industrial Relations.
