= Alexander J. Menza =

American politician (1932-2007)

Alexander J. Menza (March 31, 1932 – March 5, 2007) was an American Democratic Party politician. He served in the New Jersey General Assembly from 1972 to 1974 and in the New Jersey Senate from 1974 to 1978, where he represented the 20th Legislative District, which covers portions of Union County. He was later appointed to serve as a judge on New Jersey Superior Court.

== Biography ==
Menza grew up in the Ironbound neighborhood of Newark, New Jersey. He served in the United States Army from 1954 to 1956, where he attained the rank of first lieutenant. After completing his military service, Menza earned his undergraduate degree in 1954 from the University of Wisconsin and was awarded a law degree in 1968 from the New York University School of Law.

He served on the Hillside, New Jersey, Township Council from 1967 to 1971 and was the Mayor of Hillside in 1969. He was elected to the General Assembly in 1971 and served there until 1974. In the 1973 State Senate race, Menza defeated incumbent Republican Frank X. McDermott, who had served 10 years in office, helping the Democrats gain control of the state legislature for only the third time in the 20th century. Menza chose not to run for re-election to the Senate in 1977, and was succeeded by Anthony E. Russo. While in the Legislature, Menza served on the Mental Health Planning Committee, where he was described by Governor of New Jersey Brendan Byrne as being the "voice of the voiceless".

In 1977, Menza decided to mount a primary challenge for the United States Senate. In April 1978, The New York Times reported claims by Menza that he had been encouraged to drop out of the U.S. Senate race in exchange for an appointment to an unspecified position. In the June primary, he came in a distant third place with 8.8% of the vote, behind Richard C. Leone with 26.5% and victor Bill Bradley who took 58.9% of the vote.

Byrne appointed Menza to serve as a judge on New Jersey Superior Court in 1980, where he remained until 1997. In 1997 and 1978, Menza served as chair of the New Jersey Senate Task Force on Alcohol-Related Motor Vehicle Accidents.

Senator Menza also served on the board of trustees of the University of Medicine and Dentistry of New Jersey beginning in 2004; and shortly thereafter started the UMDNJ Theater Company, which had its first performance of a one-act play entitled "The List", written by him, in 2005. Menza could be considered a renaissance man, having loved the theater and the opera and authored many plays that were produced off-Broadway.

After a long history of cancer, Menza died on March 5, 2007, in Rome following a heart attack. Governor Jon Corzine ordered flags to flown at half-mast at state facilities on March 19, 2007, in his memory.
