= St. Mary's High School (Perth Amboy, New Jersey) =

Defunct high school in New Jersey, US

Coordinates: 40.5102°N 74.2660°W

St. Mary's High School was a private, Roman Catholic high school in Perth Amboy, Middlesex County, in the U.S. state of New Jersey.

== History ==
St. Mary's Church was established in 1844 to serve the Irish Catholics who had settled in Perth Amboy. A grammar school was established in 1852, followed by St. Mary High School in 1923, both staffed by the Sisters of Mercy.

St. Mary's High School closed in 1981 in the wake of declining enrollment. The grammar school remained open and staffed by the Sisters of Mercy until 1986, when it was merged into Perth Amboy Catholic School.

== Notable alumni ==
- Thomas J. Deverin (1921-2010), politician who served 11 terms in the New Jersey General Assembly, from 1970 to 1992
- Chris Smith (born 1953, class of 1971), politician currently serving in his 20th term as the U.S. representative for New Jersey's 4th congressional district, having served since 1981
- Jeff Van Drew (born 1953, class of 1971), politician who has served as the U.S. representative from New Jersey's 2nd congressional district since 2019
- Ruth White (1914-1969), actress who worked in theatre, film, and television
