= Peter J. Genova =

American politician (1944–2026)

Member of the New Jersey General Assembly from the 21st Legislative District
- In office April 15, 1985 – January 9, 1990
- Preceded by: Edward K. Gill
- Succeeded by: Neil M. Cohen

Personal details
- Born: June 17, 1944 Orange, New Jersey, U.S.
- Died: February 27, 2026 (aged 81)
- Party: Republican

Peter John Genova (June 17, 1944 – February 27, 2026) was an American Republican Party politician who was elected to two full terms in the New Jersey General Assembly, serving in office from 1985 to 1990, where he represented the 21st Legislative District.

== Life and career ==
Genova was elected to the General Assembly in a special election in 1985 to fill the seat left vacant by the death of Edward K. Gill in February 1985. Genova was elected to a full term in the Assembly together with running mate Chuck Hardwick in 1985, defeating Democrats Livio Mancino and Andrew K. Ruotolo Jr. Genova and Hardwick ran successfully together again in 1987, defeating challengers Robert Blitz and Brian W. Fahey. Genova had won a spot on the Republican ticket in the June 1989 primary, but stepped aside to leave a spot for Hardwick to run for re-election to the Assembly after Hardwick lost the Republican nomination for Governor of New Jersey to Jim Courter. After Genova stepped aside from running for re-election, Hardwick was chosen by acclamation at a July 1989 special convention of Republican county committee members to fill the now-vacant ballot spot. In the 1989 general election, Hardwick won re-election, but Democrat Neil M. Cohen won the other seat in the district over former Westfield Mayor Ronald J. Frigerio.

In 1987, Genova sponsored a bill targeted at the increasing use of the Spanish language by Hispanic immigrants to the state that would make English New Jersey's official language, stating that "Spanish has just grown too prominent in New Jersey". Genova argued that there was a need "to encourage people to respect English as the language of this country" and that where there is a choice between languages, English should be used exclusively.

In September 1987, a bill proposed by Genova to establish a cabinet-level department for services related to veterans passed in the Assembly by a 71-2 margin. A bill sponsored by Genova in 1988 would charge with disorderly conduct anyone who donated blood while knowing that they were infected with HIV or other communicable diseases.

A resident of Toms River, New Jersey, Genova died on February 27, 2026, at the age of 81.
