= John J. McCarthy (New Jersey politician) =

American politician

John J. McCarthy (July 19, 1927 – November 9, 2001) was an American Democratic Party politician who served in the New Jersey General Assembly and as a Councilman and as Mayor of Garwood, New Jersey. McCarthy was elected to the State Assembly in 1973, defeating incumbent Republican C. Louis Bassano in the Democratic Watergate landslide. He won by 5,503 votes. He did not seek re-election to a second term in 1975.
