= Joseph L. Garrubbo =

American politician

Joseph L. Garrubbo (born January 28, 1938) is an American Democratic Party politician who served in the New Jersey General Assembly from 1974 to 1976, and as a Judge. He is a 1962 graduate of Seton Hall University Law School and is a Certified Civil Trial Attorney. He served as a Union County Freeholder and as a Municipal Court Judge. He was elected to the State Assembly in 1973, defeating freshman Republican Assemblyman C. Louis Bassano by 6,153 votes. He lost his bid for re-election to a second term in 1975, losing to Bassano by 1,156 votes. He is a partner at Garrubbo & Capece.
