= Thomas J. Deverin =

American politician (1921–2010)

Member of the New Jersey General Assembly
- In office January 13, 1970 – January 14, 1992 Serving with John T. Gregorio and Raymond Lesniak (21st district), Raymond Lesniak, Thomas W. Long and George Hudak (20th district)
- Preceded by: Robert Wilentz
- Succeeded by: Thomas G. Dunn
- Constituency: District 7C (1970–1974); 21st Legislative District (1974–1982); 20th Legislative District (1982–1992)

Personal details
- Born: July 7, 1921 Perth Amboy, New Jersey
- Died: December 23, 2010 (aged 89) Edison, New Jersey
- Party: Democratic

Thomas J. Deverin (July 7, 1921 – December 23, 2010) was an American Democratic Party politician who served 11 terms in the New Jersey General Assembly, from 1970 to 1992, where he represented District 7C to 1974, the 21st Legislative District until 1982, and then the 20th Legislative District when redistricting following the 1980 United States census relocated him there. At the time of his departure from the Assembly, Deverin's 22 years in office made him the most senior member in the Assembly.

== Biography ==
Born in Perth Amboy, New Jersey in 1921, Deverin attended St. Mary's High School there and served in the United States Navy during World War II.

A longtime Mayor of Carteret, New Jersey, Deverin lived a few blocks away from a young Jim McGreevey and served as an early political mentor to the future Governor of New Jersey.

In 1977, the Assembly considered a bill introduced by Deverin that would require teachers in all of the state's public schools to begin the day with a "brief period of silent meditation" by all students. The legislation indicated that this meditative period "is not intended to be, and shall not be conducted as a religious service or exercise". The meditation bill was modeled after similar legislation passed in Massachusetts that had been challenged as unconstitutional by the American Civil Liberties Union and had been upheld in 1976 by a United States district court. Deverin insisted that there was "no forced religious connotation" to his proposal, though both opponents and supporters cited by The New York Times viewed it as a back-door means of re-instituting school prayer.

After five terms in the 20th District, Deverin was relocated to the 19th District in 1991, with redistricting following the 1990 Census tending to favor Republicans. A spot opened on the Democratic ticket in the 19th District when freshman Jim McGreevey chose to run for mayor of Woodbridge Township. The 19th District was described by The New York Times as a "blue-collar and traditionally rock-solid Democratic district", but Republican efforts in the district targeted Deverin and the 19th's incumbent State Senator Laurence S. Weiss, including a full-page advertisement that read "For Two Years, Florio, Weiss & Deverin Have Been Laughing All The Way To The Bank. On Nov. 5th You Can Wipe The Smile Off Their Faces." Deverin and running mate Jay Ziznewski were swept aside by Stephen A. Mikulak and Ernest L. Oros in the Republican landslide following voter disfavor with Florio's $2.8 billion tax hike. In his 22 years in office, Deverin said that he had seen political shifts before in the Legislature "but not quite to this extent". Deverin called the lame duck session following his election loss, much of which focused on repealing the tax increase that led to his defeat, one of the most strenuous of his time in the Assembly, saying "I never thought I'd say it, but I'll be glad to see Tuesday come around" when he would be leaving office.

Deverin died at the age of 89 on December 23, 2010.
