= John T. Gregorio =

American politician (1928–2013)

Member of the New Jersey Senate from the 20th district
- In office January 12, 1982 – March 15, 1983
- Preceded by: Anthony E. Russo
- Succeeded by: Raymond Lesniak

Member of the New Jersey Senate from the 21st district
- In office January 10, 1978 – January 12, 1982
- Preceded by: Thomas G. Dunn
- Succeeded by: C. Louis Bassano

Member of the New Jersey General Assembly from the 21st district
- In office January 8, 1974 – January 10, 1978 Serving with Thomas J. Deverin
- Preceded by: District created
- Succeeded by: Raymond Lesniak

Personal details
- Born: February 6, 1928 Staten Island, New York City, New York, U.S.
- Died: October 23, 2013 (aged 85) Linden, New Jersey, U.S.
- Party: Democratic

John T. Gregorio, Sr. (February 6, 1928 − October 23, 2013) was an American Democratic Party politician who served in the New Jersey General Assembly from 1976 to 1978 and in the New Jersey Senate from 1978 to 1983. Gregorio represented the 21st Legislative District until 1978, when redistricting following the 1980 United States census shifted him to the 20th Legislative District. In 1983, following a felony conviction for failing to disclose his interest in a pair of Linden go-go bars, he was forced to resign from the State Senate and from his position as Mayor of Linden, New Jersey. After receiving a gubernatorial pardon in January 1990, Gregorio staged a political comeback and won election as mayor of Linden, serving in that position until 2006.

== Biography ==
Gregorio was born in Staten Island and moved to Linden in 1949 after serving in the United States Navy as a radar man. He went into the family trade and opened a floral shop there, which was operated by his wife, Marie. Active in the local Democratic Party organization, he was elected to the Linden City Council in 1964 and became mayor for the first time in 1967. He was elected to the General Assembly, where he served from 1976 to 1978 and then moved up to the State Senate where he was in office starting in 1978 and served as chair of the Senate Labor, Industry, and Professions Committee.

After being convicted of conspiracy for concealing his ownership of two go-go bars operated by his son, Gregorio was forced to resign in 1983. The jury that convicted him in December 1982 found him not guilty on nine charges, including official misconduct, tax evasion and tampering with official records. Under the terms of his conviction, Gregorio was required to relinquish his mayoral and Senate seats and would be unable to seek elected office. In a June 1983 special election, Raymond Lesniak won the seat Gregorio was forced to vacate.

Gregorio asked Lesniak, his successor in the Senate, to pursue the possibility of getting a pardon. Governor of New Jersey Thomas Kean granted the pardon in January 1990 on his last day as governor, which allowed Gregorio to re-enter the world of politics. In the June 1990 primary, Gregorio won the Democratic nomination for mayor and was elected again as mayor by overwhelming margins.

Gregorio maintained a grip on political power in Linden and surrounding Union County that earned him recognition as "one of the few remaining old-time local political bosses in the state—and one of the most controversial". In his last years in office, Gregorio earned an annual salary of $114,000, making him one of the highest paid mayors in New Jersey. Gregorio argued that he fulfilled the municipal responsibilities of a business administrator in addition to his role as mayor.

In the 2006 general election, Gregorio lost narrowly to candidate Richard Gerbounka, an independent candidate who had served 12 years on the city council. After serving 33 years as mayor and never having lost a political race before, Gregorio said "I have no regrets. There comes a time. You can't stay in office forever" and blamed his loss by fewer than 100 votes to a lack of sufficient campaigning.

After his son was charged in 2007 with kidnapping two men who had been harassing his teenage daughter, Gregorio had no regrets about the arrest saying "he did what any father would do" and he "should have given him a medal".

Gregorio died of leukemia on October 23, 2013, aged 85, in Linden, New Jersey.

New Jersey General Assembly
Preceded by District created	Member of the New Jersey General Assembly from the 21st district 1974–1978; Served alongside: Thomas J. Deverin	Succeeded by Raymond Lesniak
New Jersey Senate
Preceded by Thomas G. Dunn	Member of the New Jersey Senate from the 21st district 1978–1982	Succeeded by C. Louis Bassano
Preceded by Anthony E. Russo	Member of the New Jersey Senate from the 20th district 1982–1983	Succeeded by Raymond Lesniak
Political offices
Preceded by Alexander Wrigley	Mayor of Linden, New Jersey; 1967–1983	Succeeded by George Hudak
Preceded by Paul Werkmeister	Mayor of Linden, New Jersey; 1991–2006	Succeeded by Richard J. Gerbounka
