= TAPinto =

News network

TAPinto.net (formerly The Alternative Press)
- Website type: News, digital advertising
- Founded: 2008
- Headquarters: New Providence, New Jersey, {{{location_country}}}
- No. of locations: 95
- Area served: New Jersey, New York, Pennsylvania, Florida
- Founder: Michael Shapiro
- Key people: Michael Shapiro, CEO
- Industry: Local News
- Services: Local news and digital marketing
- Website: www.tapinto.net
- Launched: October 2008
- Current status: Active

TAPinto is a network of more than 95 independently owned and operated local news and digital marketing platforms in New Jersey, New York, Pennsylvania and Florida. Based in New Providence, New Jersey. TAPinto.net is one of the largest online local news gathering operations in New Jersey. New Providence residents Michael and Lauryn Shapiro founded the business in October 2008.

== Franchise model ==
TAPinto operates on a franchise model. Each TAPinto local news and digital marketing platform is independently owned and operated by a franchisee, who pays a small upfront fee, a monthly fee, and a nominal percentage of advertising revenue. In exchange, the network provides thorough training, a content management system, tech development and support, graphic design, billing and credit card processing, contract software, a CRM, ongoing continuing education programs, full-time customer service support, and helps with both the business and editorial sides of their operation. TAPinto provides significant training and support to help local news entrepreneurs own and operate a local news and digital marketing platform in their community.

== Partnerships ==
TAPinto is a member of the Local Media Association, the Local Media Consortium, the New Jersey Chamber of Commerce, Downtown New Jersey, the New Jersey Society of Professional Journalists and the Center for Cooperative Media. Many TAPinto owner/publishers are members of their local chamber of commerce as well as civic and community organizations.

Many TAPinto sites have a partnership with high school newspapers in their communities, including TAPinto Berkeley Heights and Governor Livingston High School's newspaper, The Highlander.

== Honors and awards ==
In 2023, the New Jersey Society of Professional Journalists honored TAPinto with three Excellence in Journalism Awards. In 2022, the New Jersey Society of Professional Journalists honored TAPinto with eight Excellence in Journalism Awards. Also in 2022, TAPinto journalists were honored with three Excellence in Local News Awards, from the Center for Cooperative Media at Montclair State University.

In 2023, Franchise Business Review named TAPinto as a Top Franchise, Most Innovative Franchise, Top Low-Cost Franchise and Top Franchise for Women.

== Media coverage ==
- In 2023, New Jersey Globe profiled TAPinto on its 15th anniversary.
- In 2023, Downtown New Jersey featured a case study by TAPinto on how the Downtown Westfield Corporation has been able to utilize TAPinto to market its initiatives and events.
- In 2022, Editor & Publisher magazine named TAPinto as one of 10 publishers that "do it right."
- In 2022, Dan Kennedy of Northeastern University and Boston Globe editor Ellen Clegg interviewed TAPinto Founder and CEO Michael Shapiro on their What Works podcast about local news.
- The Lenfest Institute spoke with TAPinto in a piece about how TAPinto's franchise model is helping to change the local news landscape.
- In 2020, journalist and news commentator Simon Owens listed TAPinto as a news organization that is "thriving."
- In 2017, TAPinto appeared in a New York Times article called "In New Jersey, Only a Few Media Watchdogs Left."
- In 2017, CEO Michael Shapiro appeared on One on One with Steve Adubato discussing the state of news media.
- In 2016, Columbia Journalism Review profiled TAPinto on its business model.
