= Thomas W. Long =

American politician (1929–2024)

Member of the New Jersey General Assembly from the 20th Legislative District
- In office September 6, 1983 – January 14, 1986 Serving with Thomas J. Deverin
- Preceded by: Raymond Lesniak
- Succeeded by: George Hudak

Personal details
- Born: October 26, 1929 Elizabeth, New Jersey, U.S.
- Died: May 20, 2024 (aged 94)
- Party: Democratic

Thomas W. Long (October 26, 1929 – May 20, 2024) was an American politician who served in the New Jersey General Assembly from the 20th Legislative District from 1983 to 1986. Long died on May 20, 2024, at the age of 94.
