= Raymond Lesniak =

American politician (born 1946)

Member of the New Jersey Senate from the 20th district
- In office June 16, 1983 – January 9, 2018
- Preceded by: John T. Gregorio
- Succeeded by: Joseph Cryan

Member of the New Jersey General Assembly
- In office January 10, 1978 – June 16, 1983
- Preceded by: John T. Gregorio
- Succeeded by: Thomas W. Long
- Constituency: 21st district (1978–1982); 20th district (1982–1983)

Personal details
- Born: May 7, 1946 (age 80) Elizabeth, New Jersey, U.S.
- Party: Democratic
- Education: Rutgers University, Newark (BA); St. John's University (JD)

Raymond J. Lesniak (born May 7, 1946) is an American Democratic Party politician, who served in the New Jersey State Senate from 1983 to 2018, where he represented the 20th Legislative District. Before entering the New Jersey Senate, Lesniak served in the General Assembly from 1978 to 1983. Lesniak was once considered a major power broker in the Democratic Party, having served as New Jersey Democratic State Chairman, also serving as New Jersey Chair for Clinton/Gore in 1996 and as a major fundraiser for Gore/Lieberman in 2000. Lesniak finished a distant fourth place as a candidate for Governor of New Jersey in the 2017 election.

== Early life and education ==
Lesniak grew up in Elizabeth, New Jersey. He served in the U.S. Army from 1967 to 1969, then earned his Bachelor of Arts in economics from Rutgers University in 1971, and his Juris Doctor from St. John's University School of Law in 1974. He is an attorney with the firm Weiner Lesniak.

Lesniak is ethnically Polish.

In 2018, Lesniak married Salena Carroll, his girlfriend of 20 years, just a year before she died of coronary artery disease and natural causes at age 43.

== Political career ==
In 1980, Lesniak ran for the office of Mayor of Elizabeth. He was defeated by incumbent mayor Thomas G. Dunn, whom he challenged in the Democratic primary election. Dunn scored about 7,100 votes to Lesniak's 6,600 while about 2,000 went to David Conti, the challenger who came 276 votes away from toppling Dunn in 1976 and was (in 1980) endorsed by the Regular Democratic Organization of Union County.

Subsequently, Dunn orchestrated Lesniak's removal from the 'party line' -- a preferred ballot position aligned with almost all other incumbents—when it was time for the lawmaker to seek re-election to the General Assembly in 1981. Party leaders did not inform Lesniak about his loss of support until two days before the petition filing deadline. Elizabeth Health Director John Surmay was selected to replace Lesniak on the ballot between Sen. John T. Gregorio and Assemblyman Thomas J. Deverin, his prior running mates.

Building on the organization assembled during his race for mayor, the Elizabeth Democratic Association, Lesniak waged a campaign with support from organized labor, environmentalists, minority communities, and others. On June 6, 1981, Lesniak won renomination with approximately 20% more than the number of votes cast for Deverin and almost twice as many ballots as Dunn's proxy, Surmay.

In a June 1983 special election, Lesniak won the Senate seat of John T. Gregorio who was forced to vacate his office after being convicted of hiding his ownership of a pair of Linden go-go bars.

Lesniak serves on the Economic Growth Committee (as Chair), Commerce Committee (as vice-chair), the Legislative Services Commission, the Judiciary Committee and the Legislative Oversight Committee.

Lesniak has also been involved in national politics over the course of his tenure. In 1996, he was Chairman of the New Jersey Clinton-Gore Presidential Campaign, and in 2000 he was a key insider in the Al Gore campaign. Lesniak served as Chairman of the New Jersey Democratic State Committee, and Chairman of the 1997 Jim McGreevey campaign for Governor of New Jersey.

=== Legislation ===
Early in his tenure, he sponsored landmark environmental policies, such as the Environmental Cleanup Responsibility Act (now known as the Industrial Site Recovery Act), the Safe Drinking Water Act, and the Pesticide Control Act, making New Jersey first-in-the-nation to tackle such issues. The laws hold polluters responsible for their actions and have resulted in cleaner drinking water for New Jersey residents.

Lesniak has championed the abolition of the death penalty in New Jersey (after having voted for its reinstatement in 1982); the Marriage Equality Act; and environmental initiatives to clean up one of the most heavily industrialized regions in the nation. He has worked with The Humane Society and other animal rights organizations.

In 2014, Lesniak announced his plan to pass a bill that would legalize sports betting for racetracks and casinos in New Jersey, challenging the Professional and Amateur Sports Protection Act of 1992. After the Supreme Court refused the NJ appeal toward PASPA overturn in 2013, Ray Lesniak made revisions to his sports betting bill and got them approved by the US Department of Justice. Even though the new version of the bill was first vetoed by Governor Christie, Lesniak didn't stop revising it until the State Assembly finally passed S.B. 2460, and Christie signed it into law, claiming it to be a “bipartisan legislative effort.” Several more lawsuits and court appeals later, the Supreme Court of the United States overturned the Professional and Amateur Sports Protection Act in 2018.

In October 2016, Lesniak introduced a bill dubbed "Pedals' Law" that would ban black bear hunting in New Jersey for five years. This was in response to the killing of the bipedal bear Pedals by a hunter.

=== 2017 gubernatorial campaign ===
Lesniak first announced his intention to run for governor of New Jersey in 2016. He then switched to saying he would no longer seek the Democratic nomination in October, after Phil Murphy gathered early support from county leaders around the state. However, he announced in early January he was indeed running and filed the appropriate paperwork officially putting him in the race.

On June 6, 2017, he lost the primary, placing in a distant fourth behind Murphy, Jim Johnson, and John Wisniewski.

=== Later years ===
In April 2022, Lesniak published his memoir, Cultivating Justice in the Garden State: My Life in the Colorful World of New Jersey Politics (with a foreword by Bill Clinton). In 2023, after six years of retirement, he explored a run against incumbent Thomas Kean Jr. in the 2024 race for New Jersey's 7th congressional district.

== First BankAmericano directorship ==
On February 9, 2010, The Wall Street Journal published a copy of a letter from Senator Robert Menendez to the Federal Reserve pushing for approval of a deal for the sale of First BankAmericano of Elizabeth where State Senator Lesniak served on the board of directors. A media controversy arose due to BankAmericano's political connections. Its board members included several major campaign contributors to Menendez – among them State Senator Lesniak. Following the media controversy over the bailout request, it was disclosed that Lesniak had also received "insider loans" from the bank. Prior to the bailout request, First BankAmericano had been under financial pressure for more than a year because of mounting loan losses. A highly critical report by the Federal Deposit Insurance Corp.(FDIC) also found the institution had engaged in unsafe or unsound banking practices, including "operating without adequate supervision by its board of directors", an excessive level of delinquent or bad loans, inadequate earnings and insufficient coverage of its assets.

== Awards and honors ==
In 1982, Lesniak was named "Citizen of the Year" by Polish American World, and "Man of the Year" in 1991, by the Jewish National Fund, and the American Cancer Society. In 2003, he was awarded "Legislator of the Year" by the Medical Society of New Jersey for working to make healthcare more affordable and accessible, expanding the PAAD low-cost prescription drug program to cover more seniors and expanding cancer and diabetes research and education.

Lesniak was the grand marshal of the Pulaski Day Parade in New York City in 2004.

In 2009, Lesniak won the Mémorial de Caen International Human Rights Award in Normandy, France; one of only two Americans to ever do so, with the speech "The Road To Justice and Peace."

On September 30, 2014, the Raymond J. Lesniak Experience, Strength and Hope Recovery High School on the Kean University campus was inaugurated, New Jersey's first recovery high school, a program designed for youths battling drug and alcohol addiction. Lesniak, who championed the creation of the program has sponsored legislation to start similar schools in New Jersey.

== Election history ==
New Jersey State Senate elections, 2013
Party	Candidate	Votes	%
Democratic	Raymond J. Lesniak (incumbent)	21,251	100.0
Democratic hold			

New Jersey State Senate elections, 2011
Party	Candidate	Votes	%
Democratic	Raymond J. Lesniak (incumbent)	12,510	75.5
Republican	Helen S. Rosales	4,052	24.5
Democratic hold			

New Jersey State Senate elections, 2007
Party	Candidate	Votes	%
Democratic	Raymond J. Lesniak (incumbent)	9,760	58.7
Republican	Linda Gaglione	4,478	26.9
Independent	Stanley J. Moskal	2,397	14.4
Democratic hold			

New Jersey General Assembly
Preceded by John T. Gregorio	Member of the New Jersey General Assembly from the 21st district 1978–1982; Served alongside: Thomas J. Deverin	Succeeded by Chuck Hardwick
Preceded by Chuck Hardwick	Member of the New Jersey General Assembly from the 20th district 1982–1983; Served alongside: Thomas J. Deverin	Succeeded by Thomas W. Long
New Jersey Senate
Preceded by John T. Gregorio	Member of the New Jersey Senate from the 20th district 1983–2018	Succeeded by Joseph Cryan
Party political offices
Preceded by Philip Keegan	Chair of the New Jersey Democratic Party; 1992–1994	Succeeded by Tom Byrne
