= Anthony E. Russo =

American politician (born 1926)

Member of the New Jersey Senate from the 20th district
- In office 1978–1982
- Preceded by: Alexander J. Menza
- Succeeded by: C. Louis Bassano (redistricting)

Mayor of Union Township, Union County, New Jersey
- In office January 1974 – January 1975
- Preceded by: F. Edward Biertuempfel
- Succeeded by: James Conlon
- In office January 1983 – January 1987
- Preceded by: James Conlon
- Succeeded by: Diane Heelan
- In office January 1988 – January 1994
- Preceded by: Diane Heelan
- Succeeded by: Jerry Petti

Personal details
- Born: August 8, 1926 (age 100) Phillipsburg, New Jersey
- Party: Democratic
- Education: Lafayette College (A.B.); Rutgers Law School (LL.B.)

Anthony Ernest Russo (born August 8, 1926) is an American Democratic Party politician who served in the New Jersey Senate and as the mayor of Union Township, New Jersey. Since 1972, he has also served as the Union County adjuster, handling documents for the institutional commitment of psychiatric and developmentally disabled patients. As of August 2026, he is the oldest county official in New Jersey and the oldest living former New Jersey legislator.

== Early life and education ==
Anthony Ernest Russo was born in Phillipsburg, New Jersey on August 8, 1926. He first became involved in politics when Robert B. Meyner, the state senator for Warren County and a friend of the Russo family, ran successfully for governor in 1953.

He received a Bachelor of Arts degree from Lafayette College and Bachelor of Laws from Rutgers Law School.

== Political career ==
Russo has served as the Union County adjuster since 1972. He also served as the Winfield Park municipal attorney and as Union County assistant counsel.

=== Union Township committee (1962–68, 1970–79) ===
Russo entered politics on his own behalf in 1960, when he challenged Republican incumbent Kolomon Kiss for a seat on the Union Township committee. He was narrowly defeated. In 1961, he ran for committee again, and he and his running mate James Conlon won, narrowing the Republican majority on the committee to 3–2. They won despite the fact that Republican gubernatorial nominee James P. Mitchell, from neighboring Elizabeth, easily carried the township. He was re-elected in 1964 but lost his seat in 1967, amid a Republican wave that swept the New Jersey suburbs.

Russo returned to the committee two years later by unseating Kiss in the 1969 elections. After he was easily re-elected in 1972, his party won control of the committee by sweeping the 1973 election following the Watergate scandal and death of the long-serving, powerful Republican mayor F. Edward Biertuempfel. During the 1973 campaign, the Democratic nominee for New Jersey General Assembly withdrew from the race following an indictment for corruption; Russo declined an offer to run in his place. Russo was elevated to mayor upon the inauguration of the Democratic majority in 1974; he served for one year before rotating the position to Conlon and winning re-election to his committee seat in 1975. In 1976, Republicans regained their majority on the committee.

While serving in the New Jersey Senate in 1979, Russo continued to sit on the Union Township committee, as permitted under New Jersey laws on dual office-holding at the time. However, he was defeated in 1978 by a surprising margin.

=== New Jersey Senate (1978–82) ===
==== 1977 election ====
In 1977, state senator Alexander J. Menza opted not to run for re-election in the face of a stiff challenge from assemblyman Frank X. McDermott and criticism for his July 1976 vote in favor of a state income tax. At the time, Menza's district consisted of the Union County municipalities of Union Township, Cranford, Garwood, Hillside, Roselle, Roselle Park, and Westfield. Russo, a critic of the income tax, stepped in as the Democratic nominee and narrowly defeated McDermott, though Republicans won both Assembly seats from the district.

==== 1981 election ====
In 1981, decennial legislative redistricting added Kenilworth and Springfield to Russo's district (which was renumbered as the 21st district), making it one of the most competitive in the state. Shortly after the changes were announced, Republican assemblyman C. Louis Bassano announced that he would challenge Russo.

The campaign against Bassano was personal and bitter, with Bassano portraying Russo as an ineffective legislator, who had sponsored only seven bills, of which four were vetoed, who sponsored bills for personal benefit. Russo countered by citing his perfect attendance record and claiming that a large number of his bills were still pending action. Bassano ultimately won the district by winning huge margins in the Republican strongholds of Cranford and Westfield.

=== Return to Union Township committee (1983–95) and subsequent Senate campaigns ===
After leaving the Senate in 1982, Russo immediately sought to return to the township committee. He won, finishing a close second behind Conlon, and in January 1983, he was named mayor again. He immediately sought to challenge Bassano for re-election in 1983. In the Democratic primary, he faced former Union County freeholder Joanne Rajoppi; however, Rajoppi dropped out to run for county register.

Bassano, whose campaign was run by David Wildstein, attacked Russo for drawing two public salaries as mayor and adjuster, as well as public income received through his legal work for local municipalities. Russo pledged not to run for municipal office if he was returned to the Senate and criticized Bassano for opposing rent control and additional subsidies for prescription drugs for senior citizens. Bassano won the race by 565 votes, again carried by large margins in Westfield and Cranford.

Despite a landslide victory for Thomas Kean in the 1985 gubernatorial election, Russo was returned to the township committee and continued as mayor until 1987, when Republicans regained the majority.

In 1987, Russo challenged Bassano for the third consecutive campaign. Though he considered dropping out of the race due to poor fundraising, his campaign was buoyed by conflict between Kean and the Republican legislature over a bill to allow the state to seize control of failing school districts, abolishing local school boards and installing state-appointed leadership. Bassano was one of seven Republicans in the Senate to oppose the bill; Kean's chief of staff privately threatened that Kean would come out against his re-election. Although the campaign was fought largely along the same issues as in 1981 and 1983, Russo additionally attacked Bassano for accepting political action committee donations and pledged to donate his senatorial salary to the American Cancer Society. Bassano won by his largest margin yet, over four thousand votes, and nearly carried Union Township. Although the district appeared to become more competitive in the landslide 1989 elections, with Neil Cohen flipping one Assembly seat, redistricting made it substantially more Republican before Bassano's next race in 1991, allowing him to continue in office safely through his retirement in 2001. On the eve of Russo's 100th birthday in 2026, Bassano referred to his longtime opponent as "Mr. Union" and "the toughest opponent I ever had," comparing their long political rivalry and subsequent reconciliation to that of John Adams and Thomas Jefferson.

Despite Russo's loss in the 1987 Senate race, a Democratic majority was reestablished on the township committee, and Russo became mayor for the third time. He served until 1994; although the majority was expanded in the 1993 elections, fellow Democratic committee member Jerry Petti ousted Russo as mayor with support from other members. Russo was defeated for reelection in 1994, ending his political career.

=== Legacy ===
As a member of the township committee for a total of twenty-seven years over three decades, and mayor for ten, Russo oversaw a period of substantial population growth and construction in Union. He helped establish the township Senior Citizens Department, launched the state's first municipal senior bus service, and helped develop a permanent senior center. He also emphasized the township's colonial and revolutionary heritage, requiring storefront improvements to maintain architectural character, installing historical markers throughout the township, and fundraising for the acquisition of the historic Caldwell property which served as the headquarters of the township historical society.

Anthony Russo Park is named in his honor.

== Personal life ==
His wife, Anna, predeceased him in January 2022.
