= Thomas G. Dunn =

American politician (1921–1998)

Thomas Gerard Dunn

Member of the New Jersey General Assembly from the 20th district
- In office January 14, 1992 – January 11, 1994 Serving with George Hudak
- Preceded by: Thomas J. Deverin
- Succeeded by: Neil M. Cohen; Joseph Suliga

Member of the New Jersey Senate from the 21st district
- In office January 8, 1974 – January 10, 1978
- Preceded by: Newly created
- Succeeded by: John T. Gregorio

Mayor of Elizabeth, New Jersey
- In office January 1, 1965 – December 31, 1992
- Preceded by: Steven J. Bercik
- Succeeded by: J. Christian Bollwage

Personal details
- Born: April 9, 1921 Elizabeth, New Jersey, U.S.
- Died: February 11, 1998 (aged 76) Elizabeth, New Jersey, U.S.
- Party: Democratic
- Spouse(s): Ruth Dunn (d. 1989); Sally Dunn
- Children: 2

Thomas Gerard Dunn (April 9, 1921 – February 11, 1998) was an American Democratic Party politician who was a longtime Mayor of Elizabeth, New Jersey. His 28 years leading the city made him what some believed was the longest-serving mayor of a city in the United States with more than 100,000 people. (However, Joseph P. Riley Jr. was mayor of Charleston, South Carolina, (population 120,000) for over 40 years.) Dunn also served in the New Jersey Senate from 1973 to 1977, representing the 21st Legislative District, and in the New Jersey General Assembly from 1992 to 1994 where he represented the 20th Legislative District. During the 1972 presidential election, Dunn served as a national co-chairman of Democrats for Nixon and was a frequent supporter of other Republican national and state candidates.

== Biography ==
Dunn was born on April 9, 1921, and raised in Elizabeth, where he attended St. Mary of the Assumption High School and Newark's Vail School of Business. He enlisted in the United States Navy during World War II, serving as an aerial gunner. He was awarded the Distinguished Flying Cross and the Air Medal. After completing his military service he helped found Local 1470 of the International Brotherhood of Electrical Workers while working at the Kearny, New Jersey Western Electric facility.

== Mayor ==
In his first bid for elected office in 1950, he fell six votes short of winning in a seat on the Elizabeth City Council, but came back and won in 1952. He was elected to the Union County Board of Chosen Freeholders in 1959. He ran for Mayor of Elizabeth and lost in 1961, but was elected to the first of seven four-year terms in office in 1964. FBI agents later released audio recordings of a meeting between Dunn and Mafia boss Sam 'The Plumber' DeCavalcante, during which the politician accepted cash, promised to deliver city work and was asked to tell two other individuals to "keep their mouths shut." During the 1980s, Dunn hired Mafia soldier JoJo Ferarra as a municipal inspector on the city payroll.

In the wake of the 1967 Newark riots, Dunn issued orders to use deadly force if rioting erupted in the city, which was credited with preventing the spread of unrest to Elizabeth. After gasoline stations ran low on supplies following the 1973 oil crisis, Dunn made Elizabeth one of the first cities in the nation to impose odd-even rationing. He angered many in the large Hispanic community in the 1980s, when he ordered that all city business be conducted in the English language.

He was sworn into his seventh, and what he said would be his final, term of office as mayor in 1989, making him what The New York Times described as being "believed to be the longest-serving mayor of a city of more than 100,000 residents". Despite his assurances that he would not run for mayor again, Dunn ran in the 1992 Democratic primary and lost his bid for the nomination to James Christian Bollwage, who went on the win in the November elections by a 3-1 margin over his Republican challenger.

During the 1972 United States presidential election, Dunn served as one of the national co-chairman of Democrats for Nixon. Dunn was "read out of the party" in 1974 for his support of the Republican Nixon. He supported Jimmy Carter in the 1980 presidential race, but became the New Jersey chair of Democrats for Reagan in 1984. He bucked the Democratic Party again in 1993, serving as state co-chair of Democrats supporting Republican Christine Todd Whitman in her successful race against Democratic incumbent James Florio.

== Senator and Assemblyman ==
He was elected to the New Jersey Senate in 1973, where he opposed passage of the Equal Rights Amendment. After a single term in the Senate, Dunn was dropped by the Union County Democrats and was replaced on the party line by John T. Gregorio. Dunn ran as an independent and lost to Gregorio in the general election.

His staunch conservative ideology, dubious ethical standing and irascible personality earned Dunn a spirited primary election challenge from progressive Democrat James J. Devine when he ran for the General Assembly in 1991. Subsequent to his slim nomination victory, Dunn won an uncontested general election with running mate George Hudak.

Dunn declined to seek another term in the Legislature in 1993, after losing his mayoralty the previous year.

== Personal ==
Dunn shared his passion for Irish music and culture on Tom Dunn's Irish Show, which ran on radio station WJDM from 1974 to 1992.

In 1982, Mr. Dunn founded the Thornsticks, a local charitable group that quietly helped families in need. The name was taken from the crooked walking sticks used in Ireland.

The son of James J. Dunn and Mary Ellen Moran Dunn, Dunn died at age 76 on February 11, 1998, at his home in Elizabeth due to prostate cancer. He was survived by his second wife, Sally, as well as a son, Thomas G Dunn Jr. (1947-) and his wife Elizabeth, a daughter, Kathleen Dunn Priestley (1952-) and her husband Robert, and three grandchildren, Brian Priestley (1979–2008), Mairin Priestley (1982-) and Meghan Dunn (1993-). His first wife, Ruth, had died in 1989.
