= 1995 New Jersey General Assembly election =

- November 7, 1995

All 80 seats to the General Assembly 41 seats needed for a majority
- Turnout: 38% (▼27pp)

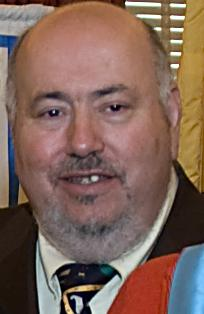
	Majority party	Minority party
Leader	Chuck Haytaian (retired)	Joseph Doria
Party	Republican	Democratic
Leader since	January 9, 1990	January 12, 1988
Leader's seat	23rd (Independence Township)	31st (Bayonne)
Last election	53	27
Seats before	52	28
Seats won	50	30
Seat change	▼2	▲2
- Results: Republican gain Democratic gain Republican hold Democratic hold
Speaker before election
Chuck Haytaian
Republican
Elected Speaker
Jack Collins
Republican

The 1995 New Jersey General Assembly elections were held on November 7, 1995, for all 80 seats in the lower house of the New Jersey Legislature. Republicans held a 52-28 majority in the lower house prior to the election, as Democrats flipped a seat in the 18th district in a 1994 special election. The members of the New Jersey Legislature are chosen from 40 electoral districts. Each district elects one state senator and two State Assembly members. New Jersey uses coterminous legislative districts for both its State Senate and General Assembly.

Republicans were able to flip one seat in the 2nd and both in the 7th. Democrats flipped one seat in the 6th, 18th, 35th, and both in the 19th.

== Incumbents not seeking re-election ==
=== Democratic ===
- Wayne R. Bryant, District 5
- George E. Williams, District 7
- Joseph Yuhas, District 15
- Harry A. McEnroe, District 28
- James Zangari, District 28

=== Republican ===
- John F. Gaffney, District 2
- C. William Haines, District 8
- Maureen Ogden, District 21
- Chuck Haytaian, District 23
- Arthur R. Albohn, District 25

== Summary of results by district ==
Legislative District	Position	Incumbent	Party	Elected Assembly Member	Party
1st	1	Nicholas Asselta	Republican	Nicholas Asselta	Republican
1st	2	John C. Gibson	Republican	John C. Gibson	Republican
2nd	1	Kenneth LeFevre	Republican	Kenneth LeFevre	Republican
2nd	2	John F. Gaffney	Republican	Francis J. Blee	Democratic
3rd	1	Jack Collins	Republican	Jack Collins	Republican
3rd	2	Gary Stuhltrager	Republican	Gary Stuhltrager	Republican
4th	1	Sean F. Dalton	Democrat	Sean F. Dalton	Democrat
4th	2	George Geist	Republican	George Geist	Republican
5th	1	Wayne R. Bryant	Democrat	Nilsa Cruz-Perez	Democrat
5th	2	Joseph J. Roberts	Democrat	Joseph J. Roberts	Democrat
6th	1	Lee A. Solomon	Republican	Louis Greenwald	Democrat
6th	2	John A. Rocco	Republican	John A. Rocco	Republican
7th	1	George E. Williams	Democrat	Diane Allen	Republican
7th	2	Steven M. Petrillo	Democrat	Carmine DeSopo	Republican
8th	1	Francis Bodine	Republican	Francis Bodine	Republican
8th	2	C. William Haines	Republican	Larry Chatzidakis	Republican
9th	1	Jeffrey Moran	Republican	Jeffrey Moran	Republican
9th	2	Christopher J. Connors	Republican	Christopher J. Connors	Republican
10th	1	James W. Holzapfel	Republican	James W. Holzapfel	Republican
10th	2	David W. Wolfe	Republican	David W. Wolfe	Republican
11th	1	Thomas S. Smith	Republican	Thomas S. Smith	Republican
11th	2	Steve Corodemus	Republican	Steve Corodemus	Republican
12th	1	Clare Farragher	Republican	Clare Farragher	Republican
12th	2	Michael Arnone	Republican	Michael Arnone	Republican
13th	1	Joann H. Smith	Republican	Joann H. Smith	Republican
13th	2	Joseph Azzolina	Republican	Joseph Azzolina	Republican
14th	1	Paul Kramer	Republican	Paul Kramer	Republican
14th	2	Barbara W. Wright	Republican	Barbara W. Wright	Republican
15th	1	Shirley Turner	Democrat	Shirley Turner	Democrat
15th	2	Joseph Yuhas	Democrat	Reed Gusciora	Democrat
16th	1	Walter J. Kavanaugh	Republican	Walter J. Kavanaugh	Republican
16th	2	Christopher Bateman	Republican	Christopher Bateman	Republican
17th	1	Bob Smith	Democrat	Bob Smith	Democrat
17th	2	Jerry Green	Democrat	Jerry Green	Democrat
18th	1	Jeffrey A. Warsh	Republican	Peter Barnes	Democrat
18th	2	Barbara Buono	Democrat	Barbara Buono	Democrat
19th	1	Stephen A. Mikulak	Republican	Arline Friscia	Democrat
19th	2	Ernest L. Oros	Republican	John Wisniewski	Democrat
20th	1	Neil M. Cohen	Democrat	Neil M. Cohen	Democrat
20th	2	Joseph Suliga	Democrat	Joseph Suliga	Democrat
21st	1	Monroe Jay Lustbader	Republican	Monroe Jay Lustbader	Republican
21st	2	Maureen Ogden	Republican	Kevin J. O'Toole	Republican
22nd	1	Richard Bagger	Republican	Richard Bagger	Republican
22nd	2	Alan Augustine	Republican	Alan Augustine	Republican
23rd	1	Leonard Lance	Republican	Leonard Lance	Republican
23rd	2	Chuck Haytaian	Republican	Connie Myers	Republican
24th	1	Guy Gregg	Republican	Guy Gregg	Republican
24th	2	Scott Garrett	Republican	Scott Garrett	Republican
25th	1	Anthony R. Bucco	Republican	Anthony R. Bucco	Republican
25th	2	Arthur R. Albohn	Republican	Michael Patrick Carroll	Republican
26th	1	Alex DeCroce	Republican	Alex DeCroce	Republican
26th	2	Carol J. Murphy	Republican	Carol J. Murphy	Republican
27th	1	LeRoy J. Jones Jr.	Democrat	LeRoy J. Jones Jr.	Democrat
27th	2	Nia Gill	Democrat	Nia Gill	Democrat
28th	1	Harry A. McEnroe	Democrat	Craig A. Stanley	Democrat
28th	2	James Zangari	Democrat	Wilfredo Caraballo	Democrat
29th	1	Willie B. Brown	Democrat	Willie B. Brown	Democrat
29th	2	Jackie Mattison	Democrat	Jackie Mattison	Democrat
30th	1	Joseph Malone	Republican	Joseph Malone	Republican
30th	2	Melvin Cottrell	Republican	Melvin Cottrell	Republican
31st	1	Joseph Doria	Democrat	Joseph Doria	Democrat
31st	2	Joseph Charles	Democrat	Joseph Charles	Democrat
32nd	1	Joan M. Quigley	Democrat	Joan Quigley	Democrat
32nd	2	Anthony Impreveduto	Democrat	Anthony Impreveduto	Democrat
33rd	1	Louis Romano	Democrat	Louis Romano	Democrat
33rd	2	Raul Garcia	Democrat	Raul Garcia	Democrat
34th	1	Marion Crecco	Republican	Marion Crecco	Republican
34th	2	Gerald H. Zecker	Republican	Gerald H. Zecker	Republican
35th	1	Bill Pascrell	Democrat	Bill Pascrell	Democrat
35th	2	Donald Hayden	Republican	Alfred Steele	Democrat
36th	1	Paul DiGaetano	Republican	Paul DiGaetano	Republican
36th	2	John V. Kelly	Republican	John V. Kelly	Republican
37th	1	Ken Zisa	Democrat	Ken Zisa	Democrat
37th	2	Loretta Weinberg	Democrat	Loretta Weinberg	Democrat
38th	1	Patrick J. Roma	Republican	Patrick J. Roma	Republican
38th	2	Rose Marie Heck	Republican	Rose Marie Heck	Republican
39th	1	Charlotte Vandervalk	Republican	Charlotte Vandervalk	Republican
39th	2	John E. Rooney	Republican	John E. Rooney	Republican
40th	1	Nicholas Felice	Republican	Nicholas Felice	Republican
40th	2	David C. Russo	Republican	David Russo	Republican

=== Close races ===
Districts where the difference of total votes between the top-two parties was under 10%:

District	Margin	Result
1	9.8%	Republican hold
4	2.1%	Democratic hold
6	1.4%	Democratic gain
13	6.7%	Republican hold
14	5.6%	Republican hold
18	6.8%	Democratic gain
34	8.6%	Republican hold
36	9.1%	Republican hold

== List of races ==
=== District 1 ===
New Jersey general election, 1995
Party	Candidate	Votes	%	±%
Republican	John C. Gibson	24,512	29.2	▲1.3
Republican	Nicholas Asselta	21,588	25.7	▼5.5
Democratic	Louis N. Magazzu	19,441	23.2	▲2.9
Democratic	John R. Rauh	18,302	21.8	▲1.9
Total votes		83,843	100.0	

=== District 2 ===
New Jersey general election, 1995
Party	Candidate	Votes	%	±%
Republican	Kenneth C. LeFevre	22,072	28.5	▲2.1
Republican	Frank Blee	21,070	27.2	▲1.6
Democratic	Tom Foley	18,010	23.3	▼2.7
Democratic	Barbara Hudgins	15,155	19.6	▼2.4
Natural Law	Kim D. Fioriglio	1,017	1.3	N/A
Total votes		77,324	100.0	

=== District 3 ===
New Jersey general election, 1995
Party	Candidate	Votes	%	±%
Republican	Jack Collins	27,171	31.0	▼1.2
Republican	Gary W. Stuhltrager	26,595	30.3	▼1.1
Democratic	John J. Gentile	15,761	18.0	▼0.6
Democratic	Harry L. Rink	15,292	17.4	▼0.4
Conservative	Robert J. McFetridge	1,494	1.7	N/A
Conservative	William A. Junghans	1,417	1.6	N/A
Total votes		87,730	100.0	

=== District 4 ===
New Jersey general election, 1995
Party	Candidate	Votes	%	±%
Democratic	Sean F. Dalton	18,219	25.8	▲0.8
Republican	George F. Geist	18,082	25.6	▲0.6
Democratic	Chris Manganello	16,114	22.8	▼0.9
Republican	Gerald J. Luongo	14,769	20.9	▼3.4
Conservative	Tom Dooley	1,816	2.6	N/A
Conservative	Carol Dooley	1,573	2.2	N/A
Total votes		70,573	100.0	

=== District 5 ===
New Jersey general election, 1995
Party	Candidate	Votes	%	±%
Democratic	Joe Roberts	20,618	34.2	▼0.5
Democratic	Nilsa Cruz-Perez	19,006	31.5	▼3.4
Republican	David Brodecki	10,635	17.6	▲2.1
Republican	Jose Delgado	10,000	16.6	▲1.8
Total votes		60,259	100.0	

=== District 6 ===
New Jersey general election, 1995
Party	Candidate	Votes	%	±%
Democratic	Louis D. Greenwald	23,743	26.3	▲3.0
Republican	Dr. John A. Rocco	22,520	24.9	▼2.3
Republican	Lee A. Solomon	22,125	24.5	▼2.5
Democratic	Annette Castiglione-Degan	22,039	24.4	▲1.9
Total votes		90,427	100.0	

=== District 7 ===
New Jersey general election, 1995
Party	Candidate	Votes	%	±%
Republican	Diane Allen	22,242	27.7	▲5.6
Republican	Carmine De Sopo	20,480	25.5	▲3.6
Democratic	Steven M. Petrillo	17,129	21.4	▼6.7
Democratic	Joseph P. Dugan	17,014	21.2	▼6.8
U.S. Taxpayers	Dixie Lee Patterson	1,386	1.7	N/A
Moderate Independent	George Guzdek	1,188	1.5	N/A
Natural Law	Susan H. Normandin	453	0.6	N/A
Natural Law	Charles L. Normandin	314	0.4	N/A
Total votes		80,206	100.0	

=== District 8 ===
New Jersey general election, 1995
Party	Candidate	Votes	%	±%
Republican	Francis L. Bodine	18,129	25.9	▼4.3
Republican	Martha W. Bark	17,994	25.7	▼4.7
Democratic	Russell H. Bates	14,983	21.4	▲1.7
Democratic	Michael W. Kwasnik	14,787	21.1	▲1.4
Libertarian	Janice Presser, PhD, RN, CNS	1,846	2.6	N/A
Conservative	Richard J. Lynch	1,400	2.0	N/A
Conservative	Laurie J. Lynch	984	1.4	N/A
Total votes		70,123	100.0	

=== District 9 ===
New Jersey general election, 1995
Party	Candidate	Votes	%	±%
Republican	Christopher J. Connors	33,394	32.7	▲0.2
Republican	Jeffrey W. Moran	33,113	32.4	▲0.2
Democratic	Miriam Wolkofsky	14,979	14.6	▼3.0
Democratic	Matt Cutano	14,959	14.6	▼3.0
Conservative	Nancy L. Eissing	2,992	2.9	N/A
Conservative	Leonard P. Marshall	2,835	2.8	N/A
Total votes		102,272	100.0	

=== District 10 ===
New Jersey general election, 1995
Party	Candidate	Votes	%	±%
Republican	David W. Wolfe	22,837	28.9	▼1.4
Republican	James W. Holzapfel	22,806	28.8	▼1.6
Democratic	Richard P. Strada	14,669	18.5	▼0.3
Democratic	Richard Sevrin	13,836	17.5	▼0.6
Conservative	Gary J. Rich	2,483	3.1	▲1.8
Conservative	Agnes A. James	2,455	3.1	▲1.9
Total votes		79,086	100.0	

=== District 11 ===
New Jersey general election, 1995
Party	Candidate	Votes	%	±%
Republican	Steve Corodemus	19,786	26.8	▲0.3
Republican	Tom Smith	19,588	26.6	▼0.3
Democratic	Patricia S. Murray	15,933	21.6	▼1.3
Democratic	Matthew M. Donovan	15,314	20.8	▼0.8
Conservative	Tom Appleby	1,357	1.8	▲1.0
Conservative	Michael Connelly, Jr.	1,211	1.6	▲0.8
Natural Law	Patricia A. Bily	274	0.4	N/A
Natural Law	Frances M. Nikovits	262	0.4	N/A
Total votes		73,725	100.0	

=== District 12 ===
New Jersey general election, 1995
Party	Candidate	Votes	%	±%
Republican	Michael J. Arnone	20,301	33.3	▲1.5
Republican	Clare M. Farragher	20,275	33.3	▲1.8
Democratic	Lynn Reich	13,996	23.0	▲4.4
Conservative	Richard Pezzullo	2,539	4.2	N/A
Conservative	Frances H. Marshall	2,426	4.0	N/A
Natural Law	Ronnie Dougherty	733	1.2	N/A
Natural Law	Gordon Smith	676	1.1	N/A
Total votes		60,946	100.0	

=== District 13 ===
New Jersey general election, 1995
Party	Candidate	Votes	%	±%
Republican	Joe Azzolina	20,103	25.5	▼4.3
Republican	Joann H. Smith	19,887	25.2	▼5.4
Democratic	Patrick M. Gillespie	18,178	23.1	▲3.4
Democratic	Mike Spaeth	16,885	21.4	▲2.3
Conservative	Nick Lombardi	1,947	2.5	N/A
Conservative	Jerome Bowe	1,812	2.3	N/A
Total votes		78,812	100.0	

=== District 14 ===
New Jersey general election, 1995
Party	Candidate	Votes	%	±%
Republican	Paul R. Kramer	23,861	25.2	▼2.5
Republican	Barbara W. Wright	22,919	24.2	▼4.1
Democratic	Tina D’Oria	21,260	22.5	▲0.2
Democratic	John Huntoon	20,161	21.3	▲0.6
Conservative	Bruce C. Mac Donald	3,349	3.5	N/A
Conservative	Walt Sully	3,119	3.3	N/A
Total votes		94,669	100.0	

=== District 15 ===
New Jersey general election, 1995
Party	Candidate	Votes	%	±%
Democratic	Shirley K. Turner	20,681	28.2	▲2.5
Democratic	Reed Gusciora	19,294	26.3	▲2.6
Republican	Joe Constance	15,319	20.9	▼2.6
Republican	Gloria S. Teti	14,675	20.0	▲1.0
Conservative	George E. Borchers	1,131	1.5	N/A
Libertarian	Robert D. Figueroa	1,105	1.5	N/A
Conservative	Beverly Kidder	1,029	1.4	N/A
Total votes		73,234	100.0	

=== District 16 ===
New Jersey general election, 1995
Party	Candidate	Votes	%	±%
Republican	Christopher “Kip” Bateman	22,406	28.7	▼3.3
Republican	Walter J. Kavanaugh	22,359	28.6	▼2.7
Democratic	Joseph Tricarico, Jr	14,683	18.8	0.0
Democratic	Mitchell E. Ignatoff, Jr	13,553	17.4	▲0.6
Conservative	Robert Kowal	2,635	3.4	N/A
Conservative	Harry Boeselager	2,449	3.1	N/A
Total votes		78,085	100.0	

=== District 17 ===
New Jersey general election, 1995
Party	Candidate	Votes	%	±%
Democratic	Bob Smith	17,068	33.6	▲1.6
Democratic	Jerry Green	16,611	32.7	▲1.7
Republican	Michael De Nardo	7,367	14.5	▼4.2
Republican	Michael Ullnick	7,043	13.9	▼4.5
Conservative	Richard Rutkowski	1,441	2.8	N/A
Conservative	Erich Sturn	1,201	2.4	N/A
Total votes		50,731	100.0	

=== District 18 ===
New Jersey general election, 1995
Party	Candidate	Votes	%	±%
Democratic	Barbara A. Buono	20,530	26.6	▲5.2
Democratic	Peter J. Barnes, Jr.	19,531	25.3	▲4.9
Republican	Jeff Warsh	17,941	23.3	▼5.0
Republican	L. Jane Tousman	16,790	21.8	▼8.1
Individuals Count	Frank J. Coury	2,351	3.0	N/A
Total votes		77,143	100.0	

=== District 19 ===
New Jersey general election, 1995
Party	Candidate	Votes	%	±%
Democratic	John S. Wisniewski	21,832	28.9	▲4.7
Democratic	Arline M. Friscia	20,671	27.3	▲5.7
Republican	Stephen A. Mikulak	15,948	21.1	▼3.7
Republican	Ernest L. Oros	14,238	18.8	▼5.8
Conservative	Ted Rocca	1,467	1.9	N/A
Conservative	Bob Harsell	1,466	1.9	N/A
Total votes		75,622	100.0	

=== District 20 ===
New Jersey general election, 1995
Party	Candidate	Votes	%	±%
Democratic	Neil M. Cohen	14,838	34.8	▲8.9
Democratic	Joseph S. Suliga	14,697	34.5	▲9.0
Republican	Thomas Rocco	5,730	13.4	▼4.6
Republican	Richard Revilla	5,724	13.4	▼2.8
Conservative	Dorothy De Laura	856	2.0	N/A
Conservative	David Csuray	799	1.9	N/A
Total votes		42,644	100.0	

=== District 21 ===
New Jersey general election, 1995
Party	Candidate	Votes	%	±%
Republican	Kevin J. O'Toole	20,765	28.6	▼3.8
Republican	Monroe Jay Lustbader	20,713	28.6	▼2.7
Democratic	Kay Slattery	15,761	21.7	▲3.5
Democratic	Roy Allan Hirschfeld	14,208	19.6	▲1.5
Clean Government	Franklin C. Marmo	1,066	1.5	N/A
Total votes		72,513	100.0	

=== District 22 ===
New Jersey general election, 1995
Party	Candidate	Votes	%	±%
Republican	Richard H. Bagger	24,024	29.2	▼3.8
Republican	Alan M. Augustine	23,520	28.5	▼3.3
Democratic	John A. Salerno	15,782	19.2	▲0.3
Democratic	Geri Samuel	15,737	19.1	▲2.8
Conservative	Robert Hudak	1,700	2.1	N/A
Conservative	Fred J. Grill	1,627	2.0	N/A
Total votes		82,390	100.0	

=== District 23 ===
New Jersey general election, 1995
Party	Candidate	Votes	%	±%
Republican	Leonard Lance	24,134	33.5	▼6.4
Republican	Connie Myers	21,358	29.7	▼11.6
Democratic	Frank C. Van Horn	16,067	22.3	▲3.6
Conservative	Michael Kelly	5,913	8.2	N/A
Conservative	Paul Wallace	4,533	6.3	N/A
Total votes		72,005	100.0	

=== District 24 ===
New Jersey general election, 1995
Party	Candidate	Votes	%	±%
Republican	E. Scott Garrett	21,721	36.6	▼6.8
Republican	Guy R. Gregg	21,154	35.7	▼6.6
Democratic	Edwin C. Selby	9,290	15.7	▲1.5
Conservative	Bernadine Silver	4,364	7.4	N/A
Conservative	Ronald C. Pondiscio	2,803	4.7	N/A
Total votes		59,332	100.0	

=== District 25 ===
New Jersey general election, 1995
Party	Candidate	Votes	%	±%
Republican	Anthony R. Bucco	21,787	30.8	▼6.1
Republican	Michael P. Carroll	20,215	28.6	▼2.6
Democratic	Stephen D. Landfield	12,943	18.3	▲2.0
Democratic	Stanley B. Yablonsky	12,795	18.1	▲3.1
Conservative	Joseph Long	1,495	2.1	N/A
Conservative	Jim Spinosa	1,478	2.1	N/A
Total votes		70,713	100.0	

=== District 26 ===
New Jersey general election, 1995
Party	Candidate	Votes	%	±%
Republican	Carol J. Murphy	22,041	33.6	▼1.2
Republican	Alex DeCroce	21,988	33.5	▼0.4
Democratic	Paul M. Olinski	10,182	15.5	▼0.5
Democratic	Jere E. Cole, Jr.	9,950	15.2	▼0.1
Conservative	Stephen A. Bauer	1,405	2.1	N/A
Total votes		65,566	100.0	

=== District 27 ===
New Jersey general election, 1995
Party	Candidate	Votes	%	±%
Democratic	Nia H. Gill	15,903	35.6	▲1.1
Democratic	Le Roy J. Jones, Jr.	15,409	34.5	▼0.7
Republican	Jake Shapiro	6,212	13.9	▼0.7
Republican	Barbara A. Dennis	6,167	13.8	▼0.7
Conservative	Richard Schumm	495	1.1	N/A
Socialist	John-Martin Winter	478	1.1	N/A
Total votes		44,664	100.0	

=== District 28 ===
New Jersey general election, 1995
Party	Candidate	Votes	%	±%
Democratic	Wilfredo Caraballo	10,939	35.1	▼3.4
Democratic	Craig A. Stanley	10,613	34.1	▼1.4
Republican	Eugene L. Brenycz	3,756	12.1	0.0
Republican	Charles R. Olszewski	3,743	12.0	▼1.9
Pro-Life Conservative	Mary Ann E. Gaffney	688	2.2	N/A
Pro-Life Conservative	Richard S. Hester, Sr.	553	1.8	N/A
Conservative	Tammy Camastra	459	1.5	N/A
Conservative	Christopher Camastra	377	1.2	N/A
Total votes		31,128	100.0	

=== District 29 ===
New Jersey general election, 1995
Party	Candidate	Votes	%	±%
Democratic	Willie B. Brown	9,144	38.6	▼11.5
Democratic	Jackie R. Mattison	8,024	33.9	▼12.3
Republican	Robert D. Richardson	2,348	9.9	N/A
Republican	Lester S. Lewis-Powder	2,322	9.8	N/A
Socialist Workers	Toni Jackson	985	4.2	▲2.3
Socialist Workers	Robert B. Miller	881	3.7	▲1.8
Total votes		23,704	100.0	

=== District 30 ===
New Jersey general election, 1995
Party	Candidate	Votes	%	±%
Republican	Joseph R. Malone, III	19,068	33.6	▲2.8
Republican	Melvin Cottrell	18,061	31.8	▲1.7
Democratic	Lyle M. “Peggi” Sturmfels	11,387	20.0	▲0.3
Conservative	Cecilia A. Richel	3,823	6.7	N/A
Conservative	Joseph Stipick	2,528	4.4	N/A
U.S. Taxpayers	Angel A. Farley	1,963	3.5	N/A
Total votes		56,830	100.0	

=== District 31 ===
New Jersey general election, 1995
Party	Candidate	Votes	%	±%
Democratic	Joseph V. Doria, Jr.	20,793	38.5	▲4.4
Democratic	Joseph Charles, Jr.	20,724	38.4	▲4.0
Republican	Artie Williams	5,557	10.3	▼5.6
Republican	Thomas Bragen	5,529	10.2	▼5.5
Conservative	Steven Felton	486	0.9	N/A
Truth Equality Accountability	Omar A. Aziz	482	0.9	N/A
Conservative	Ken Dupey	468	0.9	N/A
Total votes		54,039	100.0	

=== District 32 ===
New Jersey general election, 1995
Party	Candidate	Votes	%	±%
Democratic	Anthony Impreveduto	24,576	34.6	▲3.8
Democratic	Joan M. Quigley	23,636	33.3	▲3.4
Republican	Todd Hennessey	10,278	14.5	▼4.6
Republican	Paul Castelli	10,020	14.1	▼4.2
Politicians Are Crooks	Dennis E. Fitzpatrick	740	1.0	N/A
Politicians Are Crooks	Edith M. Shaw	615	0.9	▼0.3
Conservative	Yvonne Battaglia	547	0.8	N/A
Conservative	Pat Armstrong	539	0.8	N/A
Eliminate County Government	Francis W. McGrath	24	0.03	N/A
Eliminate County Government	Peter A. Busacca	14	0.02	N/A
Total votes		70,989	100.0	

=== District 33 ===
New Jersey general election, 1995
Party	Candidate	Votes	%	±%
Democratic	Raul “Rudy” Garcia	21,208	39.9	▲8.7
Democratic	Louis A. Romano	20,474	38.5	▲7.6
Republican	Raphael S. Alvarez	5,488	10.3	▼7.8
Republican	Joseph Luizzi	5,453	10.3	▼7.8
Conservative	Yadira Davila	265	0.5	N/A
Conservative	Julio Espinal	226	0.4	N/A
Total votes		53,114	100.0	

=== District 34 ===
New Jersey general election, 1995
Party	Candidate	Votes	%	±%
Republican	Gerald Zecker	18,424	27.0	▼2.4
Republican	Marion Crecco	17,400	25.5	▼4.3
Democratic	Joan Waks	16,729	24.5	▲4.5
Democratic	Anthony T.V. Petrillo	13,232	19.4	▲0.3
Conservative	Tim Feeney	1,593	2.3	N/A
Conservative	Richard Arlaus	923	1.4	N/A
Total votes		68,301	100.0	

=== District 35 ===
New Jersey general election, 1995
Party	Candidate	Votes	%	±%
Democratic	William J. Pascrell, Jr.	17,400	33.3	▲1.9
Democratic	Rev. Alfred E. Steele	13,868	26.6	▲3.8
Republican	Donald Hayden	11,267	21.6	▼3.9
Republican	Dennis Gonzalez	9,685	18.5	▲2.6
Total votes		52,220	100.0	

=== District 36 ===
New Jersey general election, 1995
Party	Candidate	Votes	%	±%
Republican	Paul DiGaetano	16,337	27.7	▼2.7
Republican	John V. Kelly	15,854	26.9	▼4.1
Democratic	John W. Kelly	12,156	20.6	▲0.8
Democratic	Richard Potter	11,918	20.2	▲1.4
Conservative	Vincent J. Frantantoni	1,502	2.5	N/A
Conservative	Andrew M. Bloschak	1,150	2.0	N/A
Total votes		58,917	100.0	

=== District 37 ===
New Jersey general election, 1995
Party	Candidate	Votes	%	±%
Democratic	Loretta Weinberg	22,106	30.7	▲0.8
Democratic	Ken Zisa	19,789	27.5	▼1.8
Republican	John Mc Cann	14,149	19.6	▼1.2
Republican	Howard Williams	13,798	19.2	▼0.7
Conservative	Richard P. O’Neil	1,148	1.6	N/A
Conservative	Bettyjean Downing	1,050	1.5	N/A
Total votes		72,040	100.0	

=== District 38 ===
New Jersey general election, 1995
Party	Candidate	Votes	%	±%
Republican	Patrick J. Roma	21,013	28.2	▼4.0
Republican	Rose Marie Heck	19,655	26.4	▼4.1
Democratic	Donna M. Spoto	15,832	21.3	▲2.8
Democratic	Frederick J. Dressel	15,314	20.6	▲2.1
Conservative	Bernadette Mc Caskey	1,326	1.8	N/A
Conservative	Bernard C. Sobolewski	1,245	1.7	N/A
Total votes		74,385	100.0	

=== District 39 ===
New Jersey general election, 1995
Party	Candidate	Votes	%	±%
Republican	Charlotte Vandervalk	27,768	30.6	▼2.3
Republican	John E. Rooney	26,539	29.3	▼2.3
Democratic	Kay Palacios	17,727	19.6	▲1.1
Democratic	Alan Baskin	16,917	18.7	▲2.1
Conservative	Anthony Descisciolo	649	0.7	N/A
Conservative	Leroy A. Wolf	619	0.7	N/A
Equality To All	K.C. Tan	437	0.5	N/A
Total votes		90,656	100.0	

=== District 40 ===
New Jersey general election, 1995
Party	Candidate	Votes	%	±%
Republican	Nicholas R. Felice	22,518	33.7	▼1.3
Republican	David C. Russo	21,312	31.9	▼2.3
Democratic	Joan P. Larkin	11,464	17.2	▲1.5
Democratic	Martin Etler	10,112	15.1	0.0
Conservative	Michael A. Best	1,426	2.1	N/A
Total votes		66,832	100.0	
