= Frank Holman =

Frank Holman may refer to:

- Frank B. Holman (1930–2005), American Republican Party politician from New Jersey
- Frank E. Holman (1886–1967), American attorney

== See also ==
- Frank Holleman (fl. 1980s–2010s), attorney and politician from South Carolina
