= Fanwood, New Jersey =

Borough in Union County, New Jersey, US

- Borough
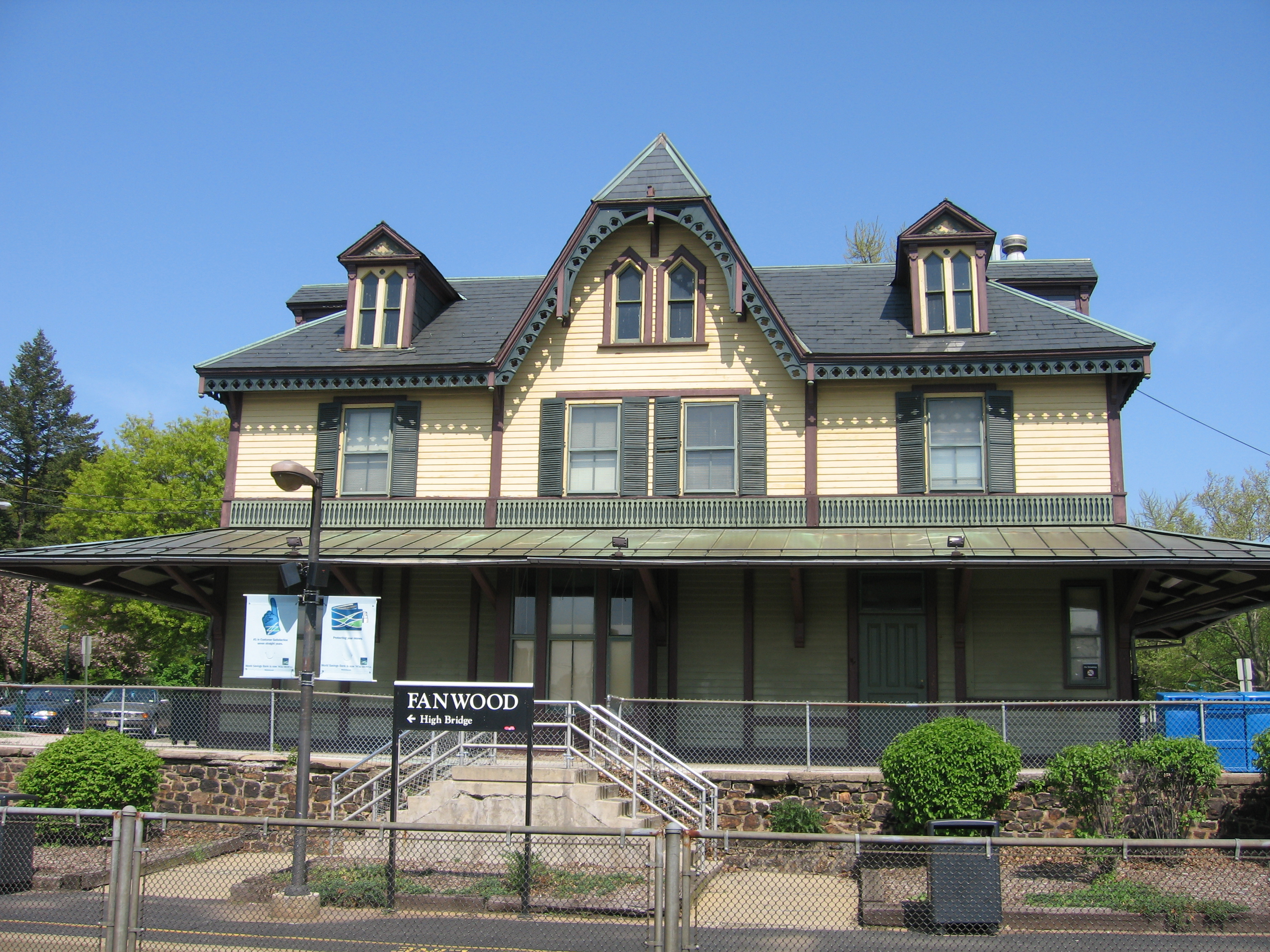
- Fanwood station on the Raritan Valley Line

- Seal

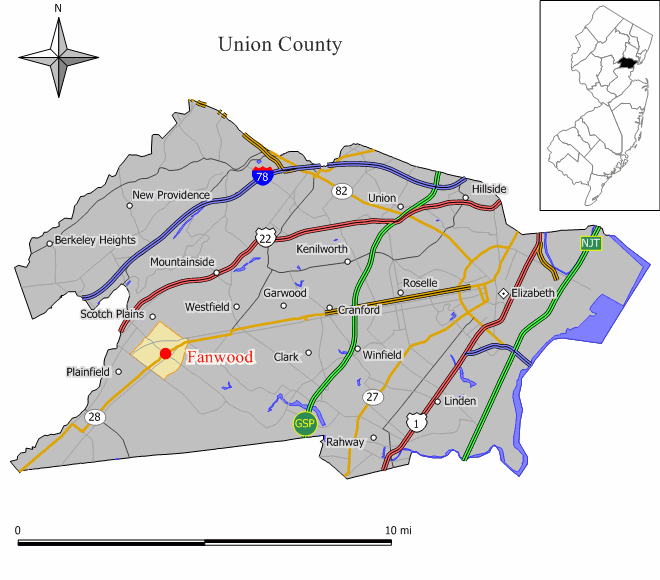
- Location of Fanwood in Union County highlighted in yellow (left). Inset map: Location of Union County in New Jersey highlighted in black (right).

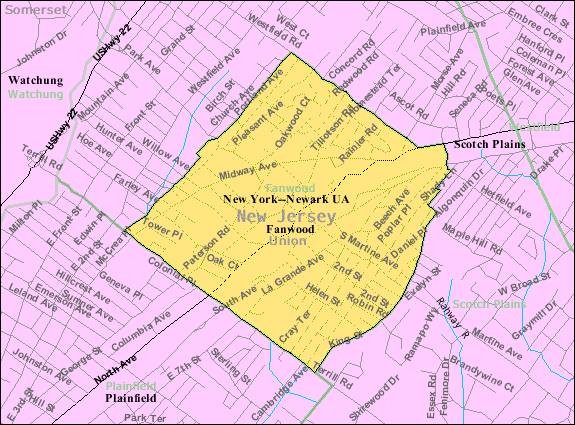
- Census Bureau map of Fanwood, New Jersey

- Location in Union County Location in New Jersey Location in the United States
- Coordinates: 40.641701°N 74.385692°W
- Country: United States
- State: New Jersey
- County: Union
- Incorporated: October 2, 1895
- Named for: Fannie Wood

Government
  - Type: Borough
  - Body: Borough Council
  - Mayor: Colleen Mahr (D, term ends December 31, 2027)
  - Administrator: Jesse Moehlman
  - Municipal clerk: Courtney Agnello

Area
  - Total: 1.34 sq mi (3.47 km^{2})
  - Land: 1.34 sq mi (3.47 km^{2})
  - Water: 0 sq mi (0.00 km^{2}) 0.00%
  - Rank: 465th of 565 in state 18th of 21 in county
- Elevation: 157 ft (48 m)

Population (2020)
  - Total: 7,774
  - Estimate (2023): 7,655
  - Rank: 301st of 565 in state 18th of 21 in county
  - Density: 5,801.5/sq mi (2,240.0/km^{2})
  - Rank: 94th of 565 in state 10th of 21 in county
- Time zone: UTC−05:00 (Eastern (EST))
  - Summer (DST): UTC−04:00 (Eastern (EDT))
- ZIP Code: 07023
- Area code: 908 exchanges: 322, 490, 889
- FIPS code: 3403922860
- GNIS feature ID: 0885216
- Website: www.fanwoodnj.org

Fanwood is a borough in Union County, in the U.S. state of New Jersey. Located on a ridge in northern-central New Jersey, the borough is a commuter town of New York City in the New York metropolitan area. Fanwood is located in the Raritan Valley and Rahway Valley regions. As of the 2020 United States census, the borough's population was 7,774, an increase of 456 (+6.2%) from the 2010 census count of 7,318, which in turn reflected an increase of 144 (+2.0%) from the 7,174 counted in the 2000 census.

Fanwood was incorporated as a borough by an act of the New Jersey Legislature on October 2, 1895, from portions of Fanwood Township (now known as Scotch Plains), based on the results of a referendum held the previous day. The borough was named for Fannie Wood, an author.

== History ==
In 1831, the Elizabethtown and Somerville Railroad received a legislative charter to construct a railroad through the area. The line reached here in 1837 and a station, known as the Scotch Plains station, was built in 1839. The company became the Central Railroad of New Jersey in 1849. The line was later moved to reduce the grade and a new station, known as the Fanwood station, was built in 1874. At the same time, the Central New Jersey Land Improvement Company began development of Fanwood Park, a residential community around the station. The development featured curvilinear streets. John Taylor Johnston, then president of CNJ, named the community after his wife, Frances, also known as Fanny, according to his daughter, Emily. In 1878, Fanwood Township was created from Plainfield and Westfield Townships.

== Historic district ==
- Fanwood Park Historic District
- U.S. National Register of Historic Places
- U.S. Historic district
- New Jersey Register of Historic Places
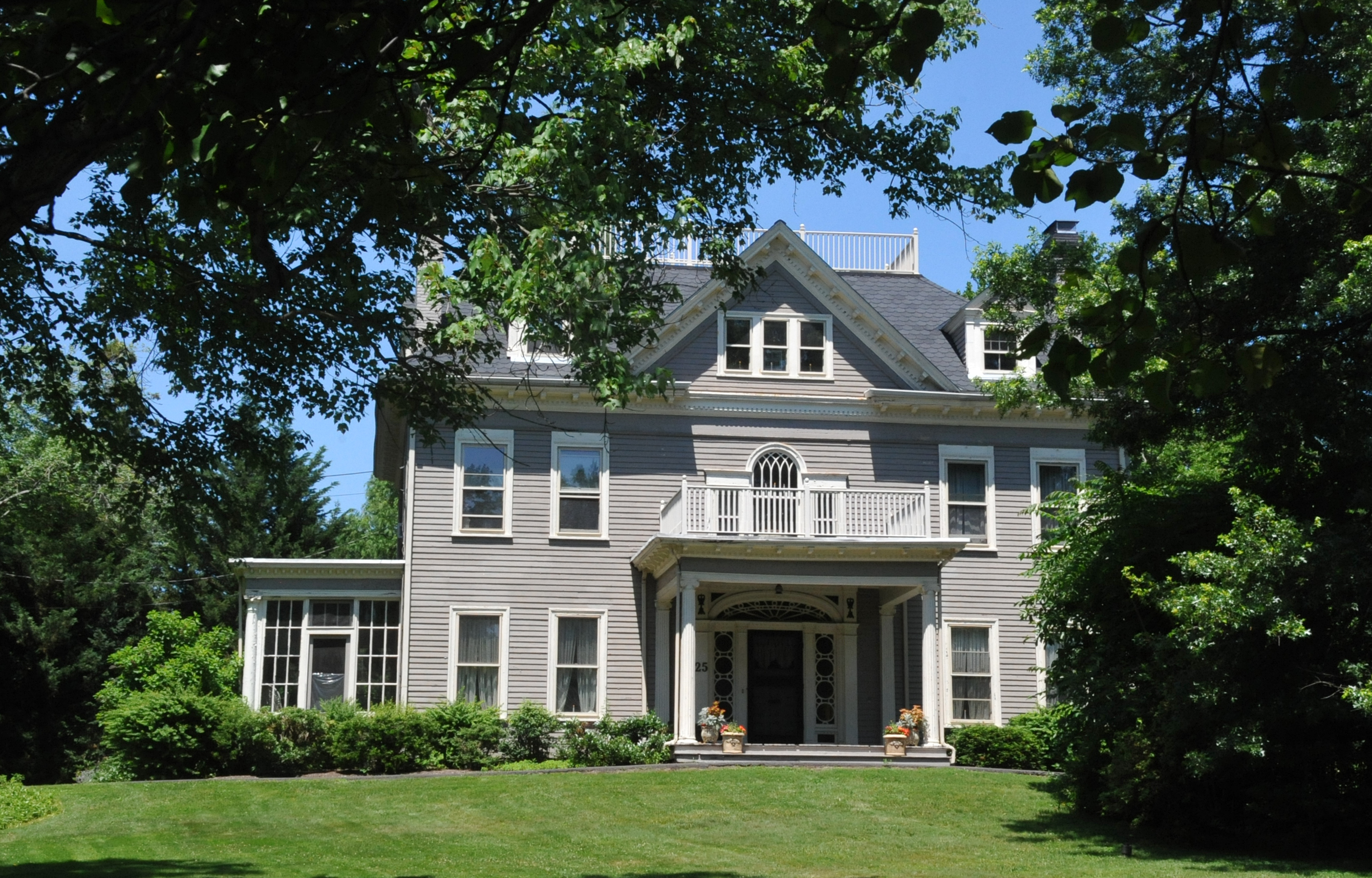
- Urner/Gibbs House
- Location: North Avenue and North Martine Avenue; Fanwood, New Jersey
- Area: 52 acres (21 ha)
- Architectural style: Early Republic, Late 19th And 20th Century Revivals
- NRHP reference No.: 04000516
- NJRHP No.: 4247

Significant dates
- Added to NRHP: May 27, 2004
- Designated NJRHP: March 8, 2004

The Fanwood Park Historic District is a 52-acre (21 ha) historic district located along North Avenue and North Martine Avenue in the community. It was added to the National Register of Historic Places on May 27, 2004, for its significance in architecture, community planning and development, landscape architecture, and transportation. The district has 57 contributing buildings, including the Fanwood station, which was previously listed individually on the NRHP. A key contributing property, the Georgian Revival style Urner/Gibbs house was built in 1894 by Benjamin Urner, as a wedding gift for his daughter who had married William M. Gibbs.

== Geography ==
According to the United States Census Bureau, the borough had a total area of 1.34 square miles (3.47 km^{2}), all of which was land.

The borough is bordered by Plainfield in the southwest and by Scotch Plains in all other directions.

The Robinsons Branch of the Rahway River additionally flows through Fanwood en route to the Robinson's Branch Reservoir.

== Demographics ==
Historical population
| Census | Pop. | Note | %± |
|---|---|---|---|
| 1900 | 399 | | — |
| 1910 | 471 | | 18.0% |
| 1920 | 724 | | 53.7% |
| 1930 | 1,681 | | 132.2% |
| 1940 | 2,310 | | 37.4% |
| 1950 | 3,228 | | 39.7% |
| 1960 | 7,963 | | 146.7% |
| 1970 | 8,920 | | 12.0% |
| 1980 | 7,767 | | −12.9% |
| 1990 | 7,115 | | −8.4% |
| 2000 | 7,174 | | 0.8% |
| 2010 | 7,318 | | 2.0% |
| 2020 | 7,774 | | 6.2% |
| 2023 (est.) | 7,655 | ▼ | −1.5% |
Population sources:1900–1920 1900–1910 1910–1930; 1940–2000 2000; 2010 2020

=== Racial and ethnic composition ===
Fanwood borough, New Jersey – Racial and ethnic composition Note: the US Census treats Hispanic/Latino as an ethnic category. This table excludes Latinos from the racial categories and assigns them to a separate category. Hispanics/Latinos may be of any race.
| Race / Ethnicity (NH = Non-Hispanic) | Pop 2000 | Pop 2010 | Pop 2020 | % 2000 | % 2010 | % 2020 |
|---|---|---|---|---|---|---|
| White alone (NH) | 6,132 | 5,853 | 5,604 | 85.48% | 79.98% | 72.09% |
| Black or African American alone (NH) | 364 | 374 | 386 | 5.07% | 5.11% | 4.97% |
| Native American or Alaska Native alone (NH) | 7 | 5 | 3 | 0.10% | 0.07% | 0.04% |
| Asian alone (NH) | 315 | 490 | 713 | 4.39% | 6.70% | 9.17% |
| Native Hawaiian or Pacific Islander alone (NH) | 2 | 0 | 2 | 0.03% | 0.00% | 0.03% |
| Other race alone (NH) | 10 | 12 | 11 | 0.14% | 0.16% | 0.14% |
| Mixed race or Multiracial (NH) | 76 | 126 | 326 | 1.06% | 1.72% | 4.19% |
| Hispanic or Latino (any race) | 268 | 458 | 729 | 3.74% | 6.26% | 9.38% |
| Total | 7,174 | 7,318 | 7,774 | 100.00% | 100.00% | 100.00% |

=== 2020 census ===
As of the 2020 census, Fanwood had a population of 7,774. The median age was 41.1 years. 25.6% of residents were under the age of 18 and 15.3% of residents were 65 years of age or older. For every 100 females there were 94.6 males, and for every 100 females age 18 and over there were 90.7 males age 18 and over.

100.0% of residents lived in urban areas, while 0.0% lived in rural areas.

There were 2,725 households in Fanwood, of which 42.2% had children under the age of 18 living in them. Of all households, 68.1% were married-couple households, 8.9% were households with a male householder and no spouse or partner present, and 20.4% were households with a female householder and no spouse or partner present. About 17.2% of all households were made up of individuals and 10.7% had someone living alone who was 65 years of age or older.

There were 2,829 housing units, of which 3.7% were vacant. The homeowner vacancy rate was 1.2% and the rental vacancy rate was 6.7%.

=== 2010 census ===
The 2010 United States census counted 7,318 people, 2,627 households, and 2,070 families in the borough. The population density was 5,454.1 per square mile (2,105.8/km^{2}). There were 2,686 housing units at an average density of 2,001.9 per square mile (772.9/km^{2}). The racial makeup was 84.72% (6,200) White, 5.30% (388) Black or African American, 0.14% (10) Native American, 6.75% (494) Asian, 0.00% (0) Pacific Islander, 0.97% (71) from other races, and 2.12% (155) from two or more races. Hispanic or Latino of any race were 6.26% (458) of the population.

Of the 2,627 households, 41.0% had children under the age of 18; 68.7% were married couples living together; 7.9% had a female householder with no husband present and 21.2% were non-families. Of all households, 18.8% were made up of individuals and 11.2% had someone living alone who was 65 years of age or older. The average household size was 2.78 and the average family size was 3.19.

27.7% of the population were under the age of 18, 4.8% from 18 to 24, 25.5% from 25 to 44, 28.0% from 45 to 64, and 14.0% who were 65 years of age or older. The median age was 40.5 years. For every 100 females, the population had 95.0 males. For every 100 females ages 18 and older there were 89.3 males. The Census Bureau's 2006–2010 American Community Survey showed that (in 2010 inflation-adjusted dollars) median household income was $127,450 (with a margin of error of +/− $8,852) and the median family income was $135,833 (+/− $6,654). Males had a median income of $92,262 (+/− $13,007) versus $62,845 (+/− $6,933) for females. The per capita income for the borough was $43,194 (+/− $2,939). About 0.6% of families and 2.2% of the population were below the poverty line, including none of those under age 18 and 2.8% of those age 65 or over.

=== 2000 census ===
As of the 2000 United States census there were 7,174 people, 2,574 households, and 2,054 families residing in the borough. The population density was 5,363.4 inhabitants per square mile (2,070.8/km^{2}). There were 2,615 housing units at an average density of 1,955.0 per square mile (754.8/km^{2}). The racial makeup of the borough was 88.30% White, 5.14% African American, 0.10% Native American, 4.39% Asian, 0.03% Pacific Islander, 0.79% from other races, and 1.24% from two or more races. Hispanic or Latino of any race were 3.74% of the population. Among Fanwood residents, 23.2% identified as being of Italian ancestry, 23.0% as being of Irish ancestry and 20.6% as having German ancestry.

There were 2,574 households, out of which 38.5% had children under the age of 18 living with them, 70.0% were married couples living together, 7.7% had a female householder with no husband present, and 20.2% were non-families. 18.0% of all households were made up of individuals, and 10.0% had someone living alone who was 65 years of age or older. The average household size was 2.76 and the average family size was 3.13.

In the borough the population was spread out, with 25.8% under the age of 18, 4.5% from 18 to 24, 31.3% from 25 to 44, 23.8% from 45 to 64, and 14.7% who were 65 years of age or older. The median age was 39 years. For every 100 females, there were 91.2 males. For every 100 females age 18 and over, there were 87.9 males.

The median income for a household in the borough was $85,233, and the median income for a family was $99,232. Males had a median income of $65,519 versus $40,921 for females. The per capita income for the borough was $34,804. About 1.6% of families and 3.4% of the population were below the poverty line, including 2.6% of those under age 18 and 6.5% of those age 65 or over.

== Economy ==
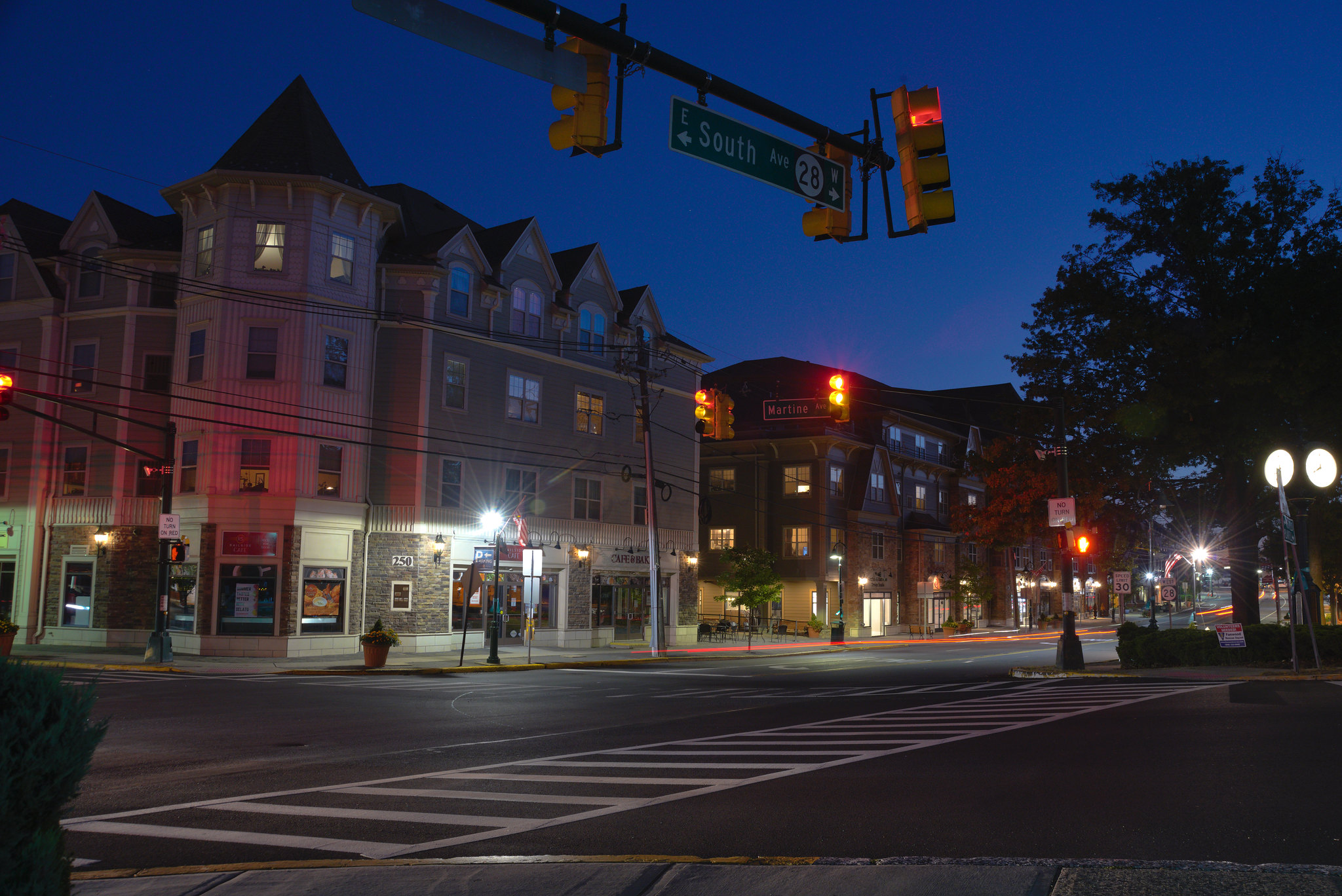
Downtown Fanwood at night

In 2014 Fanwood was recipient of a 2014 New Jersey Future Smart Growth Award for its downtown development plan.

== Government ==
=== Local government ===
Fanwood is governed under the borough form of New Jersey municipal government, which is used in 218 municipalities (of the 564) statewide, making it the most common form of government in New Jersey. The governing body is comprised of the mayor and the borough council, with all positions elected at-large on a partisan basis as part of the November general election. The mayor is elected directly by the voters to a four-year term of office. The borough council includes six members elected to serve three-year terms on a staggered basis, with two seats coming up for election each year in a three-year cycle. The borough form of government used by Fanwood is a "weak mayor / strong council" government in which council members act as the legislative body with the mayor presiding at meetings and voting only in the event of a tie. The mayor can veto ordinances subject to an override by a two-thirds majority vote of the council. The mayor makes committee and liaison assignments for council members, and most appointments are made by the mayor with the advice and consent of the council.

The borough council is Fanwood's legislative body and may pass, adopt, amend and repeal any ordinance or where permitted, any resolution, for any purpose required for the government of the municipality, and also controls and regulates the finances of the municipality. The council may investigate any activity of the municipality, remove any officer of the municipality for cause other than those excepted by law and shall have all the executive responsibilities of the municipality not placed by general law, in the office of the mayor. The mayor of Fanwood is responsible for serving as the chief executive officer of borough government. The mayor presides over the borough council, appoints various boards and committees, oversees borough administration, and serves as the borough's ceremonial head.

As of 2026, the mayor of Fanwood Borough is Democrat Colleen M. Mahr, whose term of office ends December 31, 2027. Members of the Fanwood Borough Council are Council President Gina Berry (D, 2028), Jeffrey Banks (D, 2026), Anthony Carter (D, 2026), Erin A. McElroy-Barker (D, 2027), Katherine Mitchell (D, 2028) and Patricia Walsh (D, 2027).

In January 2019, Jeffrey Banks was appointed to fill the seat expiring in December 2020 that had been held by Russell Huegel until he resigned from office to accept the position as the borough's municipal attorney.

==== Fire department ====
The Fanwood Fire Department is a volunteer fire department with 30 members that operate out of one fire station. The department has two engines, one quint and a chief's vehicle. The Fanwood Volunteer Fire Company predates the incorporation of the borough, having first been established in 1890 with its first firehouse constructed in 1897.

=== Federal, state, and county representation ===
Fanwood is located in the 7th Congressional District and is part of New Jersey's 22nd state legislative district.

For the 119th United States Congress, New Jersey's 7th congressional district is represented by Thomas Kean Jr. (R, Westfield). New Jersey is represented in the United States Senate by Democrats Cory Booker (Newark, term ends 2027) and Andy Kim (Moorestown, term ends 2031).

For the 2026–2027 session, the 22nd legislative district of the New Jersey Legislature is represented in the State Senate by Nicholas Scutari (D, Linden) and in the General Assembly by Linda S. Carter (D, Plainfield) and James J. Kennedy (D, Rahway).

Union County is governed by a Board of County Commissioners, whose nine members are elected at-large to three-year terms of office on a staggered basis with three seats coming up for election each year, with an appointed County Manager overseeing the day-to-day operations of the county. At an annual reorganization meeting held in the beginning of January, the board selects a Chair and Vice Chair from among its members. As of 2026, Union County's County Commissioners are:

Vice Chair Rebecca Williams (D, Plainfield, 2028), Chairman Joesph Bodek (D, Linden, 2026), James E. Baker Jr. (D, Rahway, 2027), Michele Delisfort (D, Union Township, 2026), Lourdes M. Leon (D, Elizabeth, 2026), Alexander Mirabella (D, Fanwood, 2027) Kimberly Palmieri-Mouded (D, Westfield, 2027). Stanley J. Neron (D, Elizabeth, 2028), Joseph Signorello III (D, Roselle Park, 2028)

Constitutional officers elected on a countywide basis are: Clerk Vacant - Incumbent Clerk Joanne Rajoppi (D, Union Township) died on July 16, 2026. Her death triggered a special election for a full five-year term to be held concurrently with the November 2026 general election. Deputy Clerk Clara Fernández assumes the powers of the office until the vacancy is filled. Sheriff Peter Corvelli (D, Kenilworth, 2026) and Surrogate Christopher E. Hudak (D, Clark, 2027).

=== Politics ===
As of March 2011, there were a total of 5,033 registered voters in Fanwood, of which 1,614 (32.1% vs. 41.8% countywide) were registered as Democrats, 1,210 (24.0% vs. 15.3%) were registered as Republicans and 2,205 (43.8% vs. 42.9%) were registered as Unaffiliated. There were 4 voters registered as Libertarians or Greens. Among the borough's 2010 Census population, 68.8% (vs. 53.3% in Union County) were registered to vote, including 95.1% of those ages 18 and over (vs. 70.6% countywide).

United States presidential election results for Fanwood
| Year | Republican | | Democratic | | Third party(ies) | |
| Year | No. | % | No. | % | No. | % |
|---|---|---|---|---|---|---|
| 2024 | 1,521 | 32.25% | 3,117 | 66.09% | 78 | 1.65% |
| 2020 | 1,531 | 31.36% | 3,282 | 67.23% | 69 | 1.41% |
| 2016 | 1,512 | 35.91% | 2,542 | 60.37% | 157 | 3.73% |
| 2012 | 1,710 | 43.59% | 2,164 | 55.16% | 49 | 1.25% |
| 2008 | 1,817 | 43.88% | 2,287 | 55.23% | 37 | 0.89% |
| 2004 | 1,957 | 48.40% | 2,045 | 50.58% | 41 | 1.01% |

In the 2012 presidential election, Democrat Barack Obama received 2,164 votes (54.8% vs. 66.0% countywide), ahead of Republican Mitt Romney with 1,710 votes (43.3% vs. 32.3%) and other candidates with 49 votes (1.2% vs. 0.8%), among the 3,947 ballots cast by the borough's 5,239 registered voters, for a turnout of 75.3% (vs. 68.8% in Union County). In the 2008 presidential election, Democrat Barack Obama received 2,287 votes (54.7% vs. 63.1% countywide), ahead of Republican John McCain with 1,817 votes (43.5% vs. 35.2%) and other candidates with 37 votes (0.9% vs. 0.9%), among the 4,179 ballots cast by the borough's 5,143 registered voters, for a turnout of 81.3% (vs. 74.7% in Union County). In the 2004 presidential election, Democrat John Kerry received 2,045 votes (50.2% vs. 58.3% countywide), ahead of Republican George W. Bush with 1,957 votes (48.1% vs. 40.3%) and other candidates with 41 votes (1.0% vs. 0.7%), among the 4,070 ballots cast by the borough's 5,013 registered voters, for a turnout of 81.2% (vs. 72.3% in the whole county).

Gubernatorial election results for Fanwood
| Year | Republican | | Democratic | | Third party(ies) | |
| Year | No. | % | No. | % | No. | % |
|---|---|---|---|---|---|---|
| 2025 | 1,253 | 31.73% | 2,681 | 67.89% | 15 | 0.38% |
| 2021 | 1,187 | 37.83% | 1,920 | 61.19% | 31 | 0.99% |
| 2017 | 1,037 | 38.22% | 1,615 | 59.53% | 61 | 2.25% |
| 2013 | 1,503 | 58.83% | 1,003 | 39.26% | 49 | 1.92% |
| 2009 | 1,468 | 50.62% | 1,140 | 39.31% | 292 | 10.07% |
| 2005 | 1,401 | 49.28% | 1,357 | 47.73% | 85 | 2.99% |

In the 2017 gubernatorial election, Democrat Phil Murphy received 1,615 votes (59.5% vs. 65.2% countywide), ahead of Republican Kim Guadagno with 1,037 votes (38.2% vs. 32.6%), and other candidates with 61 votes (2.2% vs. 2.1%), among the 2,751 ballots cast by the borough's 5,547 registered voters, for a turnout of 49.6%. In the 2013 gubernatorial election, Republican Chris Christie received 58.8% of the vote (1,503 cast), ahead of Democrat Barbara Buono with 39.3% (1,003 votes), and other candidates with 1.9% (49 votes), among the 2,604 ballots cast by the borough's 5,151 registered voters (49 ballots were spoiled), for a turnout of 50.6%. In the 2009 gubernatorial election, Republican Chris Christie received 1,468 votes (50.2% vs. 41.7% countywide), ahead of Democrat Jon Corzine with 1,140 votes (39.0% vs. 50.6%), Independent Chris Daggett with 276 votes (9.4% vs. 5.9%) and other candidates with 16 votes (0.5% vs. 0.8%), among the 2,922 ballots cast by the borough's 5,064 registered voters, yielding a 57.7% turnout (vs. 46.5% in the county).

United States Senate election results for Fanwood1
| Year | Republican | | Democratic | | Third party(ies) | |
| Year | No. | % | No. | % | No. | % |
|---|---|---|---|---|---|---|
| 2024 | 1,486 | 32.62% | 3,000 | 65.85% | 70 | 1.54% |
| 2018 | 1,348 | 39.37% | 1,950 | 56.95% | 126 | 3.68% |
| 2012 | 1,577 | 42.75% | 2,046 | 55.46% | 66 | 1.79% |
| 2006 | 1,394 | 48.44% | 1,439 | 50.00% | 45 | 1.56% |

United States Senate election results for Fanwood2
| Year | Republican | | Democratic | | Third party(ies) | |
| Year | No. | % | No. | % | No. | % |
|---|---|---|---|---|---|---|
| 2020 | 1,629 | 33.68% | 3,145 | 65.02% | 63 | 1.30% |
| 2014 | 889 | 42.70% | 1,157 | 55.57% | 36 | 1.73% |
| 2013 | 751 | 42.17% | 1,017 | 57.10% | 13 | 0.73% |
| 2008 | 1,828 | 47.57% | 1,953 | 50.82% | 62 | 1.61% |

== Education ==
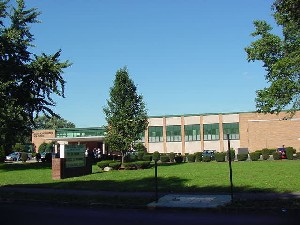
Scotch Plains-Fanwood High School

Public school students in Fanwood attend the schools of the Scotch Plains-Fanwood Regional School District, which serves students in pre-kindergarten through twelfth grade from Fanwood and Scotch Plains. The district has five elementary schools (PreK–4), two middle schools (grades 5–8) and a comprehensive high school (grades 9–12). As of the 2023–24 school year, the district, comprised of eight schools, had an enrollment of 5,758 students and 451.7 classroom teachers (on an FTE basis), for a student–teacher ratio of 12.8:1. Schools in the district (with 2023–24 enrollment data from the National Center for Education Statistics) are Howard B. Brunner Elementary School with 415 students in grades PreK–4, J. Ackerman Coles School with 548 students in grades PreK–4, Evergreen School with 425 students in grades PreK–4, William J. McGinn School with 549 students in grades K–4, School One Elementary School with 412 students in grades PreK–4, Malcolm E. Nettingham Middle School with 933 students in grades 5–8, Terrill Middle School with 834 students in grades 5–8 and Scotch Plains-Fanwood High School with 1,551 students in grades 9–12. Seats on the nine-member board of education are allocated based on the population of the constituent districts, with two seats assigned to Fanwood.

== Transportation ==
=== Roads and highways ===
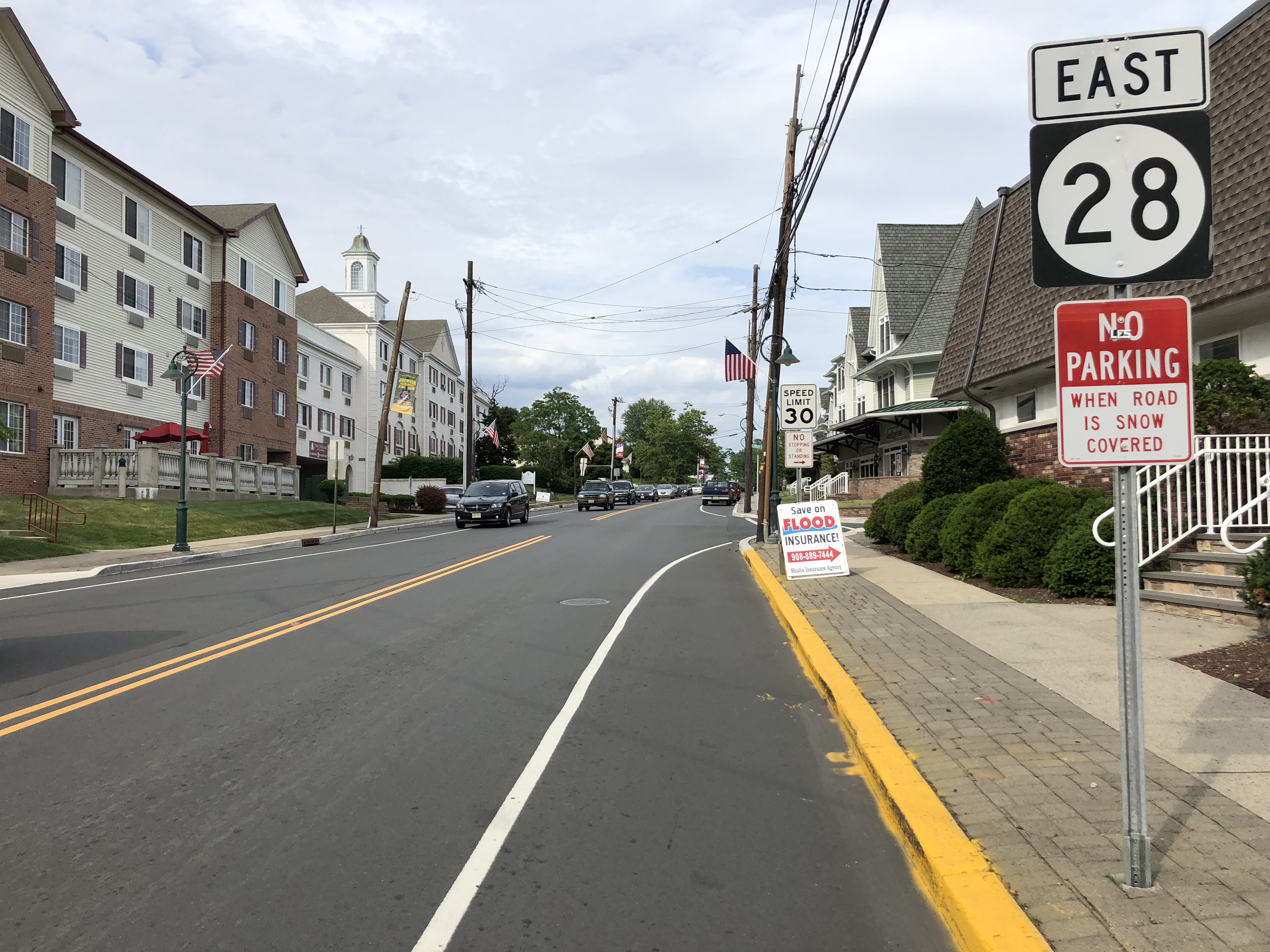
Route 28 in Fanwood

As of May 2010, the borough had a total of 26.35 miles (42.41 km) of roadways, of which 20.58 miles (33.12 km) were maintained by the municipality, 4.62 miles (7.44 km) by Union County and 1.15 miles (1.85 km) by the New Jersey Department of Transportation.

Route 28 (known in Fanwood as South Avenue) passes through the borough, connecting Plainfield and Scotch Plains.

Another major thoroughfare is South and North Martine Avenue, which connects Fanwood to U.S. Route 22 .

=== Public transportation ===
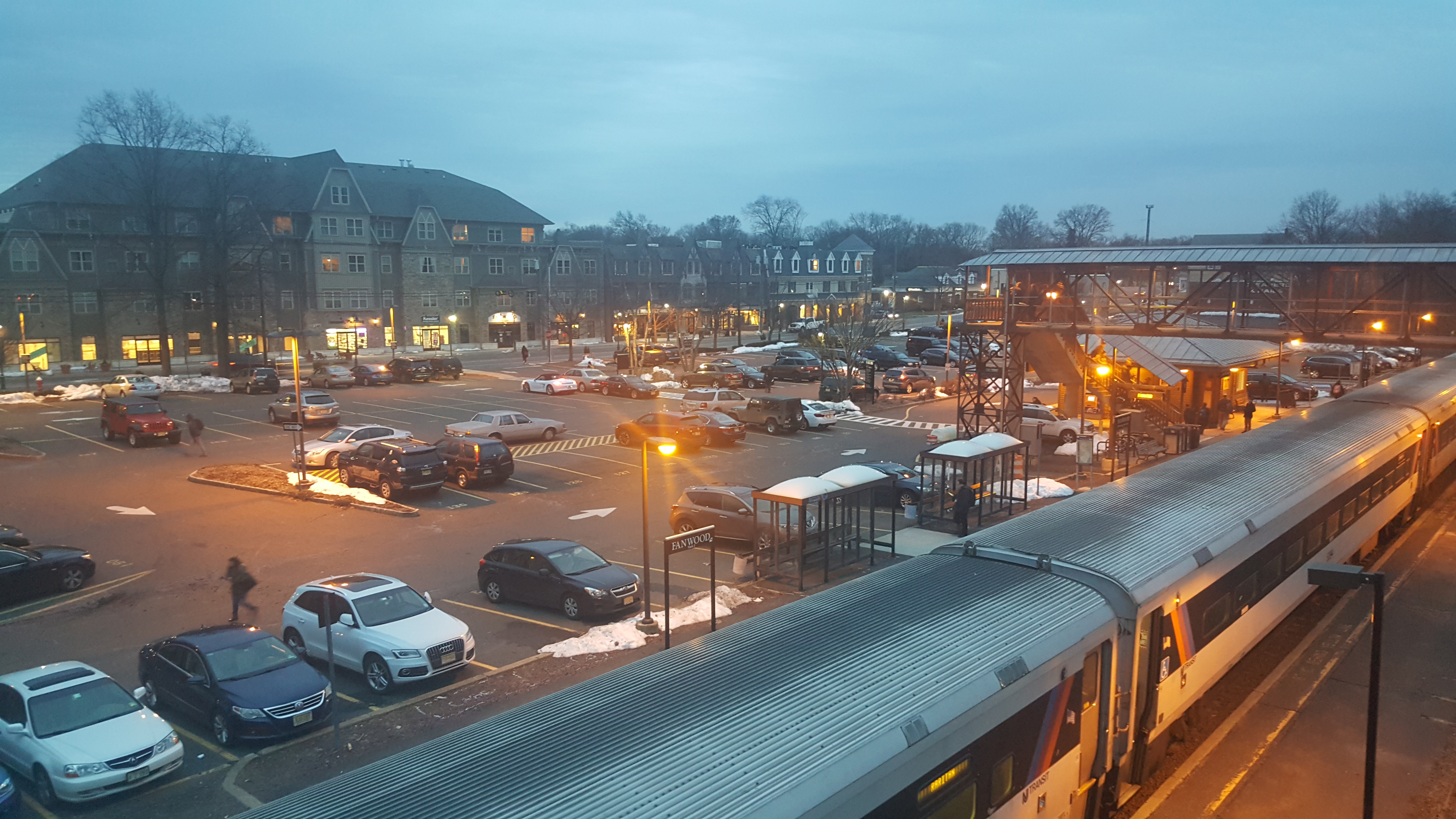
View of Fanwood Station South Side Parking Lot from overpass bridge

The Fanwood station is an NJ Transit railroad station offering commuter rail service. The ticket office is in the station building on the south side of the tracks (eastbound platform). The building on the north side of the tracks (westbound platform) is a historic Victorian building and, like the north building at Westfield station, is used by a non-profit organization. The station provides service on the Raritan Valley Line to Newark Penn Station, and from there via connections to Hoboken Terminal or New York Penn Station in Midtown Manhattan.

Currently riders can take one-seat rides to New York Penn Station during rush hour on weekdays, with transfer at Newark Penn Station required to reach to New York Penn Station at all other times, including weekends. The Raritan Valley Railroad Coalition has been promoting the economic benefits of one-seat ride access to New York City since 1998. RVRC has succeeded in gaining one-seat rides during off peak hours during the week; there are nine trains in each direction where riders do not need to transfer at Newark Penn Station. The ultimate goal of RVRC is to extend such one-seat rides during rush hours, which would have been achieved with the Access to the Region's Core tunnel program, but this had been cancelled by then Governor Chris Christie.

NJ Transit offers bus service to and from the Port Authority Bus Terminal in Midtown Manhattan on the 113 and local service on the 822 route.

Newark Liberty International Airport is approximately 25 minutes away to the east.

== Notable people ==
People who were born in, residents of, or otherwise closely associated with Fanwood include:

- Edith Ajello (born 1944), politician who has served as a member of the Rhode Island House of Representatives
- H. W. Ambruster (1879–1961), football coach, chemical engineer, actor and lecturer
- Bill Austin (c. 1937–2015), former football player
- Derrick Caracter (born 1988), power forward/center who played for the Los Angeles Lakers, now with A.S. Ramat HaSharon of the Israeli Liga Leumit
- Maryanne Connelly (born 1945), former mayor of Fanwood and 2000 House candidate
- Gerry Cooney (born 1956), boxer
- Róisín Egenton, selected The Rose of Tralee in 2000
- Emma Kenney (born 1999), actress who portrayed Debbie Gallagher on Shameless
- R. J. Kizer (1952–2026), film director and editor
- Eleanor C. Lambertsen (1916–1998), nurse who was inducted into the American Nurses Association Hall of Fame in 2012
- William Lowell Jr. (1863–1954), golf tee manufacturer
- Hiram Maxim (1840–1916), inventor of the Maxim gun, a curling iron, fire sprinklers and other devices
- Hiram Percy Maxim (1869–1936), inventor, radio pioneer and founder of the American Radio Relay League
- Raj Mukherji (born 1984), businessman, lawyer, actor and politician, who has represented the 32nd legislative district in the New Jersey Senate since 2024
- Michael Noriega (born 1978), lawyer who has served as an associate justice of the Supreme Court of New Jersey since 2023
- Zahid Quraishi (born 1975), United States district judge of the United States District Court for the District of New Jersey
- Todd D. Robinson (born c. 1963), American diplomat who was U.S. ambassador to Guatemala and Venezuela, and is now a senior advisor for Central America in the Bureau of Western Hemisphere Affairs
- Linda Stender (born 1951), member of the New Jersey General Assembly from 2002 to 2016 and former mayor of Fanwood
- Robert T. Stevens (1899–1983), businessman and former chairman of J.P. Stevens and Company
- Sada Thompson (1927–2011), actress
- Thomas Chatterton Williams (born 1981), cultural critic and author, whose works include the 2019 book Self-Portrait in Black and White

== See also ==
- National Register of Historic Places listings in Union County, New Jersey
