= New Jersey's 22nd legislative district =

American legislative district

- Senator: Nicholas Scutari (D)
- Assembly members: Linda S. Carter (D); James J. Kennedy (D)
- Registration: 46.82% Democratic; 17.39% Republican; 34.72% unaffiliated
- Demographics: 39.8% White; 22.1% Black/African American; 0.9% Native American; 5.3% Asian; 0.0% Hawaiian/Pacific Islander; 19.7% Other race; 12.2% Two or more races; 33.9% Hispanic
- Population: 229,951
- Voting-age population: 176,697
- Registered voters: 146,052

New Jersey's 22nd legislative district is one of 40 in the New Jersey Legislature. The district includes the Somerset County municipality of North Plainfield; and the Union County municipalities of Clark, Cranford, Fanwood, Linden, Plainfield, Rahway, Roselle Park, Scotch Plains and Winfield Township.

== Demographic characteristics ==
As of the 2020 United States census, the district had a population of 229,951, of whom 176,697 (76.8%) were of voting age. The racial makeup of the district was 91,410 (39.8%) White, 50,902 (22.1%) African American, 1,961 (0.9%) Native American, 12,140 (5.3%) Asian, 87 (0.0%) Pacific Islander, 45,390 (19.7%) from some other race, and 28,061 (12.2%) from two or more races. Hispanic or Latino of any race were 78,068 (33.9%) of the population.

The 22nd district had 146,052 registered voters as of December 1, 2021, of whom 48,780 (33.4%) were registered as unaffiliated, 72,133 (49.4%) were registered as Democrats, 23,134 (15.8%) were registered as Republicans, and 2,005 (1.4%) were registered to other parties.

The district had the eighth-highest percentage of African-American residents of all 40 districts statewide. The municipal tax rate was 11th highest and school taxes were 12th highest leading to one of the highest overall tax rates, after including rebates, which was the 7th highest in the state. Registered Democrats outnumbered Republicans by a 5-2 margin.

== Political representation ==
For the 2026–2027 session, the 22nd legislative district of the New Jersey Legislature is represented in the State Senate by Nicholas Scutari (D, Linden) and in the General Assembly by Linda S. Carter (D, Plainfield) and James J. Kennedy (D, Rahway).

The legislative district overlaps with New Jersey's 7th, 10th and 12th congressional districts.

== Apportionment history ==
When the 40-district legislative map was created in 1973, the 22nd district had an unusual shape as it weaved its way through the parts of Union County not covered by the 20th, 21st, and 25th districts. The center of the 1973 district was Scotch Plains and included spurs to Kenilworth, Chatham Township in Morris County via Berkeley Heights, Plainfield, and Rahway. Following the 1981 redistricting, the district became more straightforward with fewer prongs running from Winfield Township and comprising the remainder of western Union County (except Plainfield) and into western Essex County up to Caldwell with a spur to Maplewood. The 1991 district created in that year's redistricting became much more compact, comprising western Union County (again excluding Plainfield) but heading into Middlesex County's Dunellen, Morris County's Chatham Township and Passaic Township (renamed Long Hill Township in 1992) and Somerset County's Green Brook, North Plainfield, Warren Township, and Watchung.

Facing challenges from the Democrats, the team of Peter McDonough in the Senate and Donald DiFrancesco and William J. Maguire in the Assembly won re-election in 1977. McDonough resigned from the Senate in 1979; DiFrancesco won the Senate seat in a special election in November 1979 while Bob Franks and Maguire won election in the Assembly that year.

In redistricting following the 1990 United States census, Maureen Ogden was switched to the 21st district, where she won election to the Assembly, and Richard Bagger won the now-vacant ballot spot in the 22nd district.

Changes to the district made as part of the redistricting in 2001, based on the results of the 2000 United States census added Middlesex Borough and Plainfield City (from the 17th legislative district), Rahway City (from the 20th district) and Linden City (from the 21st district) and removed Berkeley Heights Township, Chatham Township, Cranford, Garwood, Long Hill Township, Mountainside Borough, New Providence Borough, Warren Township, Watchung, and Westfield Town (to the 21st legislative district). Changes made as part of the New Jersey Legislative apportionment in 2011 left the municipalities in the district unchanged.

Alan Augustine left office as of March 31, 2001, just several weeks before his death, due to health problems, and was succeeded by Thomas Kean Jr. As of January 21, 2001, DiFrancesco became the 51st Governor of New Jersey after Christine Todd Whitman left office to become Administrator of the Environmental Protection Agency, with DiFrancesco simultaneously holding his post as Senate President. In the 2001 redistricting following the 2000 United States census, several of the suburban, Republican-leaning municipalities in the district were replaced by Linden, Plainfield and Rahway, which gave the district a distinct Democratic tilt. DiFrancesco retired from the Legislature, Bagger and Kean were relocated to the 21st district, and the three legislative seats under District 22 were taken by Democrats Joseph Suliga in the Senate and Jerry Green (who previously represented District 17) and Linda Stender in the Assembly.

Suliga did not run for re-election in 2003 after a scandal involving his alleged drunken sexual harassment of a woman in Atlantic City, New Jersey. He dropped out and entered rehabilitation for alcoholism and was replaced on the ballot and in the Senate by fellow Linden Democrat Nicholas Scutari.

Due to a scandal involving her husband applying for help from Habitat for Humanity to aid in rebuilding their house on the Jersey Shore, Stender did not run for re-election in 2015. Union County Democratic officials endorsed former Rahway Mayor James J. Kennedy over Fanwood Mayor Colleen Mahr as the successor; Green and Kennedy went on to win in the general election.

Scutari, Green, and Kennedy were all re-elected in 2017, although Green did not attend any of the following legislative session due to a long illness. He died on April 18, 2018. Democratic committee members in Middlesex, Somerset, and Union Counties selected Union County Freeholder Linda S. Carter as his replacement on May 19; she took her Assembly seat on May 24.

== Election history ==
Session	Senate	General Assembly	
1974–1975	Peter McDonough (R)	Betty Wilson (D)	Arnold D'Ambrosa (D)
1976–1977	Peter McDonough (R)	Donald DiFrancesco (R)	William J. Maguire (R)
1978–1979	Peter McDonough (R) (Note: Resigned January 9, 1979)	Donald DiFrancesco (R) (Note: Elected to the Senate in November 1979 special election, sworn in on November 13, 1979)	William J. Maguire (R)
1978–1979	Donald DiFrancesco (R)	Seat vacant	William J. Maguire (R)
1980–1981	Donald DiFrancesco (R)	Bob Franks (R)	William J. Maguire (R)
1982–1983	Donald DiFrancesco (R)	Bob Franks (R)	Maureen Ogden (R)
1984–1985	Donald DiFrancesco (R)	Bob Franks (R)	Maureen Ogden (R)
1986–1987	Donald DiFrancesco (R)	Bob Franks (R)	Maureen Ogden (R)
1988–1989	Donald DiFrancesco (R)	Bob Franks (R)	Maureen Ogden (R)
1990–1991	Donald DiFrancesco (R)	Bob Franks (R)	Maureen Ogden (R)
1992–1993	Donald DiFrancesco (R)	Bob Franks (R) (Note: Resigned December 1, 1992 following his election to Congress)	Richard Bagger (R)
1992–1993	Donald DiFrancesco (R)	Alan Augustine (R) (Note: Appointed to the Assembly in December 1992)	Richard Bagger (R)
1994–1995	Donald DiFrancesco (R)	Alan Augustine (R)	Richard Bagger (R)
1996–1997	Donald DiFrancesco (R)	Alan Augustine (R)	Richard Bagger (R)
1998–1999	Donald DiFrancesco (R)	Alan Augustine (R)	Richard Bagger (R)
2000–2001	Donald DiFrancesco (R)	Alan Augustine (R) (Note: Resigned March 31, 2001 due to health issues)	Richard Bagger (R)
2000–2001	Donald DiFrancesco (R)	Thomas Kean Jr. (R) (Note: Appointed to the Assembly on April 19, 2001)	Richard Bagger (R)
2002–2003	Joseph Suliga (D)	Jerry Green (D)	Linda Stender (D)
2004–2005	Nicholas Scutari (D)	Jerry Green (D)	Linda Stender (D)
2006–2007	Nicholas Scutari (D)	Jerry Green (D)	Linda Stender (D)
2008–2009	Nicholas Scutari (D)	Jerry Green (D)	Linda Stender (D)
2010–2011	Nicholas Scutari (D)	Jerry Green (D)	Linda Stender (D)
2012–2013	Nicholas Scutari (D)	Jerry Green (D)	Linda Stender (D)
2014–2015	Nicholas Scutari (D)	Jerry Green (D)	Linda Stender (D)
2016–2017	Nicholas Scutari (D)	Jerry Green (D)	James J. Kennedy (D)
2018–2019	Nicholas Scutari (D)	Jerry Green (D) (Note: Died April 18, 2018)	James J. Kennedy (D)
2018–2019	Nicholas Scutari (D)	Linda S. Carter (D) (Note: Appointed to the Assembly on May 24, 2018, won a November 6, 2018 special election to complete unexpired term)	James J. Kennedy (D)
2020–2021	Nicholas Scutari (D)	Linda S. Carter (D)	James J. Kennedy (D)
2022–2023	Nicholas Scutari (D)	Linda S. Carter (D)	James J. Kennedy (D)
2024–2025	Nicholas Scutari (D)	Linda S. Carter (D)	James J. Kennedy (D)
2026–2027	Nicholas Scutari (D)	Linda S. Carter (D)	James J. Kennedy (D)

== Election results ==
=== Senate ===
2021 New Jersey general election
Party	Candidate	Votes	%	±%
Democratic	Nicholas P. Scutari	32,044	61.5	▼5.8
Republican	William H. Michelson	20,100	38.5	▲5.8
Total votes		52,144	100.0	

New Jersey general election, 2017
Party	Candidate	Votes	%	±%
Democratic	Nicholas P. Scutari	29,563	67.3	▲7.8
Republican	Joseph A. Bonilla	14,362	32.7	▼7.8
Total votes		43,925	100.0	

New Jersey general election, 2013
Party	Candidate	Votes	%	±%
Democratic	Nicholas P. Scutari	24,899	59.5	▼2.1
Republican	Robert Sherr	16,933	40.5	▲2.1
Total votes		41,832	100.0	

2011 New Jersey general election
Party	Candidate	Votes	%
Democratic	Nicholas Scutari	16,104	61.6
Republican	Michael W. Class	10,024	38.4
Total votes		26,128	100.0

2007 New Jersey general election
Party	Candidate	Votes	%	±%
Democratic	Nicholas P. Scutari	14,711	56.9	▲1.9
Republican	Rose McConnell	11,139	43.1	▼1.9
Total votes		25,850	100.0	

2003 New Jersey general election
Party	Candidate	Votes	%	±%
Democratic	Nicholas P. Scutari	16,658	55.0	▼4.1
Republican	Martin Marks	13,609	45.0	▲4.1
Total votes		30,267	100.0	

2001 New Jersey general election
Party	Candidate	Votes	%
Democratic	Joseph S. Suliga	29,326	59.1
Republican	Milton Campbell	20,330	40.9
Total votes		49,656	100.0

1997 New Jersey general election
Party	Candidate	Votes	%	±%
Republican	Donald T. DiFrancesco	46,249	67.0	▼2.2
Democratic	Margaret Ault	20,962	30.4	▼0.4
Conservative	Frank J. Festa, Jr.	1,778	2.6	N/A
Total votes		68,989	100.0	

1993 New Jersey general election
Party	Candidate	Votes	%	±%
Republican	Donald T. DiFrancesco	50,539	69.2	▼9.0
Democratic	Eli Hoffman	22,461	30.8	N/A
Total votes		73,000	100.0	

1991 New Jersey general election
Party	Candidate	Votes	%
Republican	Donald T. DiFrancesco	32,872	78.2
Populist	John L. Kucek	9,153	21.8
Total votes		42,025	100.0

1987 New Jersey general election
Party	Candidate	Votes	%	±%
Republican	Donald T. DiFrancesco	27,502	67.5	▲0.9
Democratic	Thomas J. Gartland	13,267	32.5	▼0.9
Total votes		40,769	100.0	

1983 New Jersey general election
Party	Candidate	Votes	%	±%
Republican	Donald T. DiFrancesco	29,005	66.6	▼1.3
Democratic	Thomas M. McCormack	14,576	33.4	▲1.3
Total votes		43,581	100.0	

1981 New Jersey general election
Party	Candidate	Votes	%
Republican	Donald T. DiFrancesco	46,330	67.9
Democratic	Frank Fiorito	21,876	32.1
Total votes		68,206	100.0

Special election, November 6, 1979
Party	Candidate	Votes	%	±%
Republican	Donald T. Di Francesco	23,969	57.4	▲2.2
Democratic	Joanne Rajoppi	17,052	40.9	▼1.6
Safe Sensible Economy	Rose Monyek	702	1.7	N/A
Total votes		41,723	100.0	

1977 New Jersey general election
Party	Candidate	Votes	%	±%
Republican	Peter J. McDonough	28,669	55.2	▲2.9
Democratic	Harry P. Pappas	22,032	42.5	▼5.2
An Independent Choice	John J. Carone	1,198	2.3	N/A
Total votes		51,899	100.0	

1973 New Jersey general election
Party	Candidate	Votes	%
Republican	Peter J. McDonough	27,827	52.3
Democratic	William Wright, Jr.	25,361	47.7
Total votes		53,188	100.0

=== General Assembly ===
2021 New Jersey general election
Party	Candidate	Votes	%	±%
Democratic	Linda S. Carter	32,267	31.3	▼9.1
Democratic	James Kennedy	31,593	30.6	▼8.4
Republican	David Sypher	19,825	19.2	▼1.4
Republican	Hans Herberg	19,546	18.9	N/A
Total votes		103,231	100.0	

2019 New Jersey general election
Party	Candidate	Votes	%	±%
Democratic	Linda S. Carter	19,486	40.4	▲8.3
Democratic	James Kennedy	18,836	39.0	▲6.4
Republican	Patricia Quattrocchi	9,919	20.6	▲3.4
Total votes		48,241	100.0	

Special election, November 6, 2018
Party	Candidate	Votes	%
Democratic	Linda S. Carter	47,685	69.4
Republican	John Quattrocchi	21,072	30.6
Total votes		68,757	100.0

New Jersey general election, 2017
Party	Candidate	Votes	%	±%
Democratic	James J. Kennedy	27,763	32.6	▲2.1
Democratic	Gerald "Jerry" Green	27,284	32.1	▲2.4
Republican	Richard S. Fortunato	14,631	17.2	▼3.2
Republican	John Quattrocchi	13,682	16.1	▼3.3
Remember Those Forgotten	Onel Martinez	942	1.1	N/A
Pushing Us Forward	Sumantha Prasad	818	1.0	N/A
Total votes		85,120	100.0	

New Jersey general election, 2015
Party	Candidate	Votes	%	±%
Democratic	James J. Kennedy	12,087	30.5	▲2.2
Democratic	Gerald "Jerry" Green	11,769	29.7	▲1.5
Republican	William "Bo" Vastine	8,076	20.4	▼2.5
Republican	William H. Michelson	7,666	19.4	▼1.2
Total votes		39,598	100.0	

New Jersey general election, 2013
Party	Candidate	Votes	%	±%
Democratic	Linda Stender	23,242	28.3	▼2.2
Democratic	Gerald "Jerry" Green	23,168	28.2	▼0.8
Republican	John Campbell	18,826	22.9	▲1.9
Republican	Jeffrey D. First	16,965	20.6	▲1.1
Total votes		82,201	100.0	

New Jersey general election, 2011
Party	Candidate	Votes	%
Democratic	Linda Stender	15,747	30.5
Democratic	Jerry Green	14,957	29.0
Republican	Joan D. Van Pelt	10,846	21.0
Republican	Jeffrey D. First	10,092	19.5
Total votes		51,642	100.0

New Jersey general election, 2009
Party	Candidate	Votes	%	±%
Democratic	Linda Stender	25,379	26.9	▼0.7
Democratic	Gerald "Jerry" Green	24,805	26.3	▼0.7
Republican	Martin Marks	22,718	24.1	▲3.4
Republican	William "Bo" Vastine	21,554	22.8	▲2.5
Total votes		94,456	100.0	

New Jersey general election, 2007
Party	Candidate	Votes	%	±%
Democratic	Linda Stender	14,054	27.6	▼4.7
Democratic	Gerald "Jerry" Green	13,765	27.0	▼3.3
Republican	Robert Gatto	10,579	20.7	▲1.0
Republican	Bryan E. Des Rochers	10,380	20.3	▲2.6
Libertarian	Sean Colon	1,215	2.4	N/A
Libertarian	Dolores Makrogiannis	1,018	2.0	N/A
Total votes		51,011	100.0	

New Jersey general election, 2005
Party	Candidate	Votes	%	±%
Democratic	Linda Stender	30,076	32.3	▲3.4
Democratic	Jerry Green	28,194	30.3	▲3.0
Republican	Nancy Malool	18,365	19.7	▼0.6
Republican	Elyse Bochicchio-Medved	16,465	17.7	▼2.3
Total votes		93,100	100.0	

New Jersey general election, 2003
Party	Candidate	Votes	%	±%
Democratic	Linda Stender	17,236	28.9	▼1.6
Democratic	Jerry Green	16,322	27.3	▼2.3
Republican	Kevin Retcho	12,126	20.3	▼0.2
Republican	George B. Gore	11,962	20.0	▲0.6
Green	Rosalie Donatelli	1,183	2.0	N/A
Green	Harold Relkin	885	1.5	N/A
Total votes		59,714	100.0	

New Jersey general election, 2001
Party	Candidate	Votes	%
Democratic	Linda Stender	29,169	30.5
Democratic	Jerry Green	28,258	29.6
Republican	Patricia Walsh	19,616	20.5
Republican	Gabe Spera	18,486	19.4
Total votes		95,529	100.0

New Jersey general election, 1999
Party	Candidate	Votes	%	±%
Republican	Richard H. Bagger	24,405	50.4	▲17.9
Republican	Alan M. Augustine	24,004	49.6	▲17.8
Total votes		48,409	100.0	

New Jersey general election, 1997
Party	Candidate	Votes	%	±%
Republican	Richard H. Bagger	43,421	32.5	▲3.3
Republican	Alan M. Augustine	42,479	31.8	▲3.3
Democratic	Andrew Baron	22,368	16.7	▼2.5
Democratic	Norman Albert	22,110	16.5	▼2.6
Conservative	Douglas Lawless	1,688	1.3	▼0.8
Conservative	Norman A. Ross	1,635	1.2	▼0.8
Total votes		133,701	100.0	

New Jersey general election, 1995
Party	Candidate	Votes	%	±%
Republican	Richard H. Bagger	24,024	29.2	▼3.8
Republican	Alan M. Augustine	23,520	28.5	▼3.3
Democratic	John A. Salerno	15,782	19.2	▲0.3
Democratic	Geri Samuel	15,737	19.1	▲2.8
Conservative	Robert Hudak	1,700	2.1	N/A
Conservative	Fred J. Grill	1,627	2.0	N/A
Total votes		82,390	100.0	

New Jersey general election, 1993
Party	Candidate	Votes	%	±%
Republican	Richard H. Bagger	47,064	33.0	▼4.5
Republican	Alan M. Augustine	45,357	31.8	▼6.1
Democratic	Susan H. Pepper	26,972	18.9	▲6.4
Democratic	Carlton W. Hansen, Jr.	23,252	16.3	▲4.1
Total votes		142,645	100.0	

1991 New Jersey general election
Party	Candidate	Votes	%
Republican	Bob Franks	37,087	37.9
Republican	Richard H. Bagger	36,704	37.5
Democratic	Edward Kahn	12,241	12.5
Democratic	Richard Kress	11,900	12.2
Total votes		97,932	100.0

1989 New Jersey general election
Party	Candidate	Votes	%	±%
Republican	Maureen Ogden	37,703	31.3	▼10.2
Republican	Bob Franks	35,792	29.7	▼9.3
Democratic	Peter J. DeCicco	24,007	19.9	▲0.5
Democratic	William A. Carrollton	23,021	19.1	N/A
Total votes		120,523	100.0	

1987 New Jersey general election
Party	Candidate	Votes	%	±%
Republican	Maureen Ogden	29,039	41.5	▲5.4
Republican	Bob Franks	27,304	39.0	▲3.5
Democratic	Robert J. Lafferty	13,597	19.4	▲5.2
Total votes		69,940	100.0	

1985 New Jersey general election
Party	Candidate	Votes	%	±%
Republican	Maureen Ogden	39,939	36.1	▲2.4
Republican	Bob Franks	39,284	35.5	▲2.4
Democratic	John F. Tully, Jr.	15,729	14.2	▼2.6
Democratic	Florence Martone	15,650	14.1	▼2.2
Total votes		110,602	100.0	

New Jersey general election, 1983
Party	Candidate	Votes	%	±%
Republican	Maureen Ogden	28,778	33.7	0.0
Republican	Bob Franks	28,282	33.1	▲0.5
Democratic	Jo-Anne B. Spatola	14,382	16.8	▼0.4
Democratic	Thomas H. Hannen, Jr.	13,939	16.3	▼0.2
Total votes		85,381	100.0	

New Jersey general election, 1981
Party	Candidate	Votes	%
Republican	Maureen B. Ogden	45,268	33.7
Republican	Bob Franks	43,681	32.6
Democratic	Richard N. Leonard	23,126	17.2
Democratic	Michael F. Alper	22,108	16.5
Total votes		134,183	100.0

New Jersey general election, 1979
Party	Candidate	Votes	%	±%
Republican	William J. Maguire	22,244	27.5	▲0.6
Republican	Bob Franks	21,307	26.4	▼1.4
Democratic	Walter E. Boright	18,774	23.2	0.0
Democratic	Patrick J. Cassidy	16,805	20.8	▼1.3
Independent	Marie A. Kisseberth	1,672	2.1	N/A
Total votes		80,802	100.0	

New Jersey general election, 1977
Party	Candidate	Votes	%	±%
Republican	Donald Di Francesco	28,052	27.8	▲2.1
Republican	William Maguire	27,142	26.9	▼0.6
Democratic	James V. Spagnoli	23,343	23.2	▼1.0
Democratic	Melvin Chilewich	22,292	22.1	▼0.5
Total votes		100,829	100.0	

New Jersey general election, 1975
Party	Candidate	Votes	%	±%
Republican	William J. Maguire	24,973	27.5	▲4.7
Republican	Donald DiFrancesco	23,301	25.7	▲3.5
Democratic	Betty Wilson	21,914	24.2	▼4.5
Democratic	William A. Wolf	20,521	22.6	▼3.7
Total votes		90,709	100.0	

New Jersey general election, 1973
Party	Candidate	Votes	%
Democratic	Betty Wilson	29,795	28.7
Democratic	Arnold J. D'Ambrosa	27,292	26.3
Republican	Herbert H. Kiehn	23,687	22.8
Republican	Arthur A. Manner	23,103	22.2
Total votes		103,877	100.0
