= Jerry Green (politician) =

American politician

Speaker pro tempore of the New Jersey General Assembly
- In office January 8, 2008 – April 18, 2018
- Preceded by: Wilfredo Caraballo
- Succeeded by: Gordon M. Johnson

Member of the New Jersey General Assembly from the 22nd district
- In office January 8, 2002 – April 18, 2018 Serving with James Kennedy
- Preceded by: Thomas Kean, Jr. Richard Bagger
- Succeeded by: Linda Carter

Member of the New Jersey General Assembly from the 17th district
- In office January 14, 1992 – January 8, 2002 Serving with Bob Smith
- Preceded by: David C. Schwartz
- Succeeded by: Upendra J. Chivukula; Joseph V. Egan

Personal details
- Born: April 16, 1939 Roselle, New Jersey, U.S.
- Died: April 18, 2018 (aged 79) Plainfield, New Jersey, U.S.
- Party: Democratic
- Spouse: Wanda

Gerald B. Green (April 16, 1939 – April 18, 2018) was an American Democratic politician, who served in the New Jersey General Assembly from 1992 until his death, representing the 22nd Legislative District (from 2002 to 2018) and the 17th Legislative District (1992 to 2002).

== Early life ==
Gerald Green was born on April 16, 1939, in Roselle, and graduated from a public high school, where he was a "star basketball player". Along with his wife Wanda, Green lived in Plainfield.

== Career ==
Green started his career as a businessman working in marketing and real estate. In 1982, he began his first term on the Union County's Board of Chosen Freeholders. During his second term from 1989 to 1991, he was elected the board's chair in 1990. Green played a prominent role in the county's politics serving on its Planning Board, the Parks & Recreation Committee and Adolescent Substance Abuse Program. He also served as the president of Roselle and Linden Merchants Association and was an honorary chairman for the March of Dimes's chapter in New Jersey for 1990.

Green was elected to the New Jersey General Assembly as a Democrat in 1992 from the 17th Legislative District. Following redistricting in 2002, he represented the 22nd Legislative District in the Assembly till his death in 2018. During his 26-year tenure as an assemblyman, Green served on the Housing and Local Government (as Chair) and on the Health and Senior Services Committee. He was also a member of the Joint Committee on Housing Affordability, deputy speaker Pro Tempore from 2004 to 2007 and Deputy Speaker from 2002 to 2003. In 2008 he became the Assembly's Speaker Pro Tempore.

Jerry Green was an innovator, a trailblazer and the most influential African American leader ever to come from Union County.

— Sergio Granados, Chairman of Union County Board of Chosen Freeholders

Green was the chairman of the Union County Democratic Committee from 2013 having replaced Charlotte DeFilippo. He was re-elected in 2015 but resigned in January 2018 citing health issues. Assemblyman Nicholas Scutari succeeded him in this capacity.

Before he died, Green was the longest-serving assemblymember in New Jersey. He was one of the key sponsors of the bill that required institutions of higher education to install sprinklers in all dormitories and was one of the facilitators responsible for bringing the Union County College campus to Plainfield.

== Death ==
He died on April 18, 2018, just two days following his 79th birthday. Democratic and Republican officials offered their consolations on his death. Linda Carter was appointed in May 2018 to fill Green's vacant Assembly seat.

New Jersey General Assembly
Preceded by Thomas Kean, Jr. Richard Bagger	Member of the New Jersey General Assembly for the 22nd District; January 8, 2002 – April 18, 2018; With: Linda Stender, James Kennedy	Succeeded by Linda Carter
Preceded by David C. Schwartz	Member of the New Jersey General Assembly for the 17th District; January 14, 1992 – January 8, 2002; With: Bob Smith	Succeeded by Upendra J. Chivukula; Joseph V. Egan
Political offices
Preceded by Wilfredo Caraballo	Speaker Pro Tempore of the New Jersey General Assembly; January 8, 2008 – April 18, 2018	Succeeded by Gordon M. Johnson
