= Linda Stender =

American politician (born 1951)

Member of the New Jersey General Assembly from the 22nd district
- In office January 8, 2002 – January 12, 2016
- Preceded by: Thomas Kean, Jr. Richard Bagger
- Succeeded by: James J. Kennedy

Mayor of Fanwood, New Jersey
- In office 1992–1995
- Succeeded by: Maryanne Connelly

Personal details
- Born: July 25, 1951 (age 75) Plainfield, New Jersey, U.S.
- Spouse: Richard Stender (m. 1976)
- Children: 3
- Education: American University (BA)

Linda Stender (born July 25, 1951) is an American Democratic Party politician who served in the New Jersey General Assembly from 2002 to 2016, where she represented the 22nd legislative district. She ran unsuccessfully for a seat in the United States House of Representatives, seeking to represent New Jersey's 7th District, in 2006 and 2008. She was narrowly defeated by incumbent Representative Mike Ferguson in 2006 but lost by a wider margin to Leonard Lance in the November 4, 2008 election.

Stender served as the Assembly's Deputy Speaker from 2006–2009 and currently serves in the Assembly on the State Government Committee (as Chair), Transportation, Public Works and Independent Authorities Committee (as Vice-Chair), and the Appropriations committee. She is a former Vice Chairwoman of the Tourism and Gaming Committee and a former Vice Chairwoman of the Environment and Solid Waste Committee.

== Background ==
Stender was born on July 25, 1951, in Plainfield, New Jersey and graduated from Scotch Plains-Fanwood High School. She received a B.A. from American University in Interdisciplinary Communications in 1973.

Stender previously served as a Councilwoman (from 1988–1990) and as Mayor of Fanwood, New Jersey from 1992 to 1995. She then won the first of three terms on the Union County Board of Chosen Freeholders where she served from 1994-2002. She served as Chairwoman of the Union County Board of Chosen Freeholders in 1997. She was elected to the State Assembly in 2001 and reelected in 2003. Democratic Party leaders denied her a chance to run for the State Senate in 2003.

Legislation sponsored by Stender and signed into law includes: The Integrated Pest Management Act, A-2841, which requires public and private schools to establish an integrated pest management policy to protect students and staff; A-2654 and A-2655, which permitted the use of reclaimed asphalt pavement on public highways maintained by local governments and by the New Jersey Department of Transportation on the State’s three toll roads; and the Toll Road Consolidation Bill, A-3392, which abolished the New Jersey Highway Authority and transferred projects and functions to the New Jersey Turnpike Authority.

Legislation sponsored by Stender includes: A-2330, which creates a low interest mortgage loan program in the NJ Housing and Mortgage Finance Agency for volunteer firefighters, emergency medical squads, and emergency rescue squads; A-2753, which requires the Port Authority of New York and New Jersey to use transported remains of victims of the September 11, 2001 attacks in a memorial; A-2930, which permits municipalities to place stop signs on certain intersections near schools, playgrounds, and youth recreational facilities; A-3345, which provides public safety members in federal or state military service who are injured or killed with disability or death benefits; A-3502, which provides municipalities with equal funding for new construction where the existing facilities are considered unfit for rehabilitation for health and safety reasons.

== Congressional campaigns ==
=== 2006 congressional race ===
Stender was the Democratic Party nominee for New Jersey's 7th congressional district (map), where she faced off against Republican incumbent Mike Ferguson. Stender lost the 7th District race by slightly more than 3,000 votes, or about 1.5% of all votes cast in the election. This is the closest challenge Ferguson has faced since being elected.

Stender campaigned as a self-described "progressive" and advocated for stem cell research.

In April 2006, Stender was endorsed by EMILY's List and Democracy for America (DFA). In May 2006, Stender was endorsed by The Sierra Club. On October 22, 2006, The New York Times endorsed Linda Stender over Mike Ferguson in the 7th district.

The Ferguson campaign ran advertisements featuring the catchphrase "Linda Stender is a Spender," criticizing her voting record as a mayor and assemblywoman.

In the end, The Star Ledger reported that it was in fact conservative-values women who helped to defeat Stender in her bid for Congress.

=== 2008 congressional race ===
In late 2007, Stender announced another run for Congress in 2008. Ferguson stated on November 19, 2007, that he will not run for reelection in 2008.

On November 19, 2007, EMILY's List announced their 2008 endorsement of Stender. On January 18, 2008, the Democratic Congressional Campaign Committee announced that Stender would be part of its 'Red to Blue' fundraising program, indicating that the district has been targeted by national Democrats. As of late January, Stender has raised over $615,000 for her 2008 campaign.

On June 3, 2008, Republicans primary voters selected State Senator Leonard Lance to be Stender's opponent in the November general election.

Stender was defeated again for this seat, losing to Leonard Lance with 41.6% to his 50.8%.

== Controversies ==
=== Criticism of Ann Coulter ===
On June 8, 2006, Stender and Assemblywoman Joan M. Quigley publicly criticized Ann Coulter's book Godless: The Church of Liberalism. Stender and Quigley issued a press release in response to Coulter's criticism of the Jersey Girls, four widows of the September 11, 2001 attacks from New Jersey who have criticized U.S. policies in the events leading up to September 11. They did not seek any legislative prohibition, but in the press release, they called on New Jersey retailers to "express their outrage by refusing to carry or sell copies of Coulter's book."

=== Alleged abuse of the Habitat for Humanity program ===
In February 2015, an investigation by NJ Advance Media found that Richard Stender, the husband of the Assemblywoman, had applied for assistance from Coastal Habitat for Humanity to demolish and then rebuild his house. The home, which was located in Manasquan, was severely damaged by Hurricane Sandy in 2012. The home was deemed beyond repair and demolished with funds from the organization.

In August 2014, plans were filled with the Manasquan Zoning Office to replace the original 700 square feet (65 m^{2}) with a much larger 2,000 square feet (190 m^{2}) home. The home that was requested was about three times larger than the original and much larger than the ones that the organization usually builds for low-income residents. When the organization received the plans, Maureen Mulligan, executive director of Coastal Habitat for Humanity immediately said "...no. This was not the type of house that Habitat builds, which is a three-bedroom one-and-a-half bath, 1,200 square foot house."

Habitat for Humanity helps homeowners who make up to 80 percent of Monmouth County's median household income, which is $84,526. However, Linda Stender's legislative financial disclosure records shows her combined income with her husband was at least $99,000 a year in 2012 and 2013.

The financial disclosures also list the Manasquan property as the only one owned by either Stender or her husband. Stender registered to run for reelection in 2013 from a Scotch Plains address, and told her district-mate, Assemblyman Jerry Green, that she lives with her mother and that her husband lives in Manasquan.

The controversy has led Stender to retire from the Assembly choosing not to run for re-election in 2015.

New Jersey General Assembly
Preceded by Thomas Kean, Jr. Richard Bagger	Member of the New Jersey General Assembly for the 22nd District; January 8, 2002 – January 12, 2016; With: Jerry Green	Succeeded by James J. Kennedy
Political offices
Preceded by Edwin Force	Chairwoman of the Board of Chosen Freeholders of Union County, New Jersey; 1997	Succeeded by Daniel Sullivan
Party political offices
Preceded by Steve Brozak	Democratic nominee for the 7th Congressional District of New Jersey; 2006, 2008	Succeeded by Ed Potosnak
