= Alan Augustine =

American politician

Member of the New Jersey General Assembly from the 22nd district
- In office December 14, 1992 – March 31, 2001 Serving with Richard Bagger
- Preceded by: Bob Franks
- Succeeded by: Thomas Kean Jr.

Personal details
- Born: August 17, 1928
- Died: June 11, 2001 (aged 72) Elizabeth, New Jersey, U.S.
- Party: Republican
- Education: Lafayette College (AB)

Alan Mandeville Augustine (August 17, 1928 – June 11, 2001) was an American Republican Party politician who served for 30 years as mayor and councilman of Scotch Plains, New Jersey, Union County freeholder, and member of the New Jersey General Assembly representing the 22nd Legislative District, which at the time included the Union County communities of Fanwood, Mountainside, Scotch Plains, and Westfield.

== Biography ==
Augustine was elected to the Scotch Plains Township Committee in 1970, and served there for 16 years, including three as mayor. He served on the Union County Board of Chosen Freeholders from 1982 to 1987 and again from 1991 to 1992. He served as freeholder chairman in 1987 and as the board's vice chairman in both 1982 and 1986.

In December 1992, Augustine was chosen to fill the seat in the New Jersey General Assembly that was vacated by Bob Franks after he won election to Congress.

Among the legislation he introduced in the Assembly were bills to extend the state's lemon law to motorized wheelchairs and a Pet Purchase Protection Law, two of the 26 bills he sponsored that became law. Augustine submitted one of the earliest pieces of identity theft legislation, following a 1998 symposium on the subject, and sponsored a bill to study the effect on drivers using cell phones and other distractions.

Augustine left office as of March 31, 2001 due to health problems, and was succeeded by Thomas Kean Jr.

Augustine died on June 11, 2001, of cancer, at Father Hudson House, a hospice in Elizabeth, New Jersey.

New Jersey General Assembly
Preceded by Bob Franks	Member of the New Jersey General Assembly from the 22nd district 1992–2002; Served alongside: Richard Bagger	Succeeded by Thomas Kean Jr.
