= James J. Kennedy =

Member of the New Jersey General Assembly

Member of the New Jersey General Assembly from the 22nd district
- Incumbent
- Assumed office January 12, 2016 Serving with Linda Carter
- Preceded by: Linda Stender

Mayor of Rahway, New Jersey
- In office January 1, 1991 – December 31, 2010
- Preceded by: Daniel Martin
- Succeeded by: Richard B. Proctor

Personal details
- Born: February 9, 1953 (age 73)
- Party: Democratic
- Spouse: Lori Kennedy
- Website: Legislative Website

James J. Kennedy (born February 9, 1953) is an American politician. A member of the Democratic Party, he has represented the 22nd Legislative District in the New Jersey General Assembly since taking office in January 2016. He served as Mayor of Rahway, New Jersey from 1991 through 2010, when he declined to seek a sixth term.

== Career ==
Kennedy won his first nomination in the 1990 Democratic primary election, when he contested the re-election for Daniel Martin, who at the time had been mayor for 20 years. Kennedy owns a local store, Kennedy Jewelers, that was adversely affected by the decline of the city's downtown area during the 1970s and 1980s, and he was president of the Rahway Chamber of Commerce during the later 1980s. While serving on the board of trustees for the Rahway YMCA, Kennedy befriended Jim McGreevey, a lawyer then residing in neighboring Woodbridge Township who would ultimately become Governor of New Jersey. After McGreevey became governor, Kennedy joined State Street Partners, a Trenton lobbying firm founded by Rocco F. Iossa, a former aide to Republican Congressman Dennis Gallo and counselor to GOP Governor Christine Todd Whitman. After McGreevey, resigned Kennedy started a business, Skye Consulting L.L.C., which has assisted local governments, redevelopment contractors and a foreign-owned water treatment and waste management utility company.

Kennedy and his wife, Lori, a kindergarten teacher who retired in June 2011, have one son, Sean, who operates the jewelry store on a day-to-day basis. The couple previously had another child, who died when he was two years old.

== New Jersey General Assembly ==
Following the retirement of incumbent Democratic Assemblywoman Linda Stender in 2015, Kennedy was chosen by the local Democratic County Committees over Fanwood Mayor Colleen Mahr to succeed Stender. He won the general election alongside incumbent Jerry Green that November.

=== Committees ===
Committee assignments for the 2024—2025 Legislative Session are:

- Environment, Natural Resources, and Solid Waste (as chair)
- Telecommunications and Utilities (as vice-chair)
- Transportation and Independent Authorities

=== District 22 ===
Each of the 40 districts in the New Jersey Legislature has one representative in the New Jersey Senate and two members in the New Jersey General Assembly. The representatives from the 22nd District for the 2024—2025 Legislative Session are:

- Senator Nicholas Scutari (D)
- Assemblywoman Linda S. Carter (D)
- Assemblyman James J. Kennedy (D)

== Electoral history ==
=== New Jersey Assembly ===
22nd Legislative District General Election, 2023
Party	Candidate	Votes	%
Democratic	Linda Carter (incumbent)	23,710	33.3
Democratic	James Kennedy (incumbent)	23,123	32.5
Republican	Lisa Fabrizio	12,272	17.2
Republican	Patricia Quattrocchi	12,087	17.0
Total votes		71,192	100.0
Democratic hold			
Democratic hold			

22nd legislative district general election, 2021
Party	Candidate	Votes	%
Democratic	Linda Carter (incumbent)	32,267	31.26%
Democratic	James J. Kennedy (incumbent)	31,593	30.60%
Republican	David Sypher	19,825	19.20%
Republican	Hans Herberg	19,546	18.93%
Total votes		103,231	100.0
Democratic hold			

22nd Legislative District General Election, 2019
Party	Candidate	Votes	%
Democratic	Linda Carter (incumbent)	18,703	40.25%
Democratic	James Kennedy (incumbent)	18,099	38.95%
Republican	Patricia Quattrocchi	9,665	20.8%
Total votes		46,467	100%
Democratic hold			

New Jersey general election, 2017
Party	Candidate	Votes	%	±%
Democratic	James J. Kennedy (Incumbent)	27,763	32.6	▲2.1
Democratic	Jerry Green (Incumbent)	27,284	32.1	▲2.4
Republican	Richard S. Fortunato	14,631	17.2	▼3.2
Republican	John Quattrocchi	13,682	16.1	▼3.3
Total votes		'85,120'	'100.0'	

New Jersey general election, 2015
Party	Candidate	Votes	%	±%
Democratic	James J. Kennedy (Incumbent)	12,087	30.5	▲2.2
Democratic	Jerry Green (Incumbent)	11,769	29.7	▲1.5
Republican	William "Bo" Vastine	8,076	20.4	▼2.5
Republican	William H. Michelson	7,666	19.4	▼1.2
Total votes		'39,598'	'100.0'	

New Jersey General Assembly
Preceded by Linda Stender	Member of the New Jersey General Assembly for the 22nd District; January 12, 2016 – Present; With: Jerry Green, Linda Carter	Succeeded by Incumbent
Political offices
Preceded by Daniel Martin	Mayor of Rahway, New Jersey; January 1, 1991 – December 31, 2010	Succeeded by Richard B. Proctor
