= Richard Bagger =

American politician (born 1960)

Rich Bagger

Member of the New Jersey Senate from the 21st district
- In office January 8, 2002 – January 15, 2003
- Preceded by: Kevin J. O'Toole
- Succeeded by: Thomas Kean Jr.

Member of the New Jersey General Assembly from the 22nd district
- In office January 14, 1992 – January 8, 2002
- Preceded by: Maureen Ogden
- Succeeded by: Jerry Green; Linda Stender

Personal details
- Born: Richard Hartvig Bagger; March 27, 1960 (age 66) Plainfield, New Jersey, U.S.
- Party: Republican
- Education: Princeton University (BA); Rutgers University, Newark (JD)

Richard Hartvig Bagger (born March 27, 1960) is an American Republican Party politician from New Jersey, and former State Senator who later served as chief of staff to Governor Chris Christie. He left the Christie administration in early 2012, and is now an Executive Vice President with Celgene. He is a resident of Westfield, New Jersey.

== Life and career ==
Bagger was born in Plainfield, New Jersey. Raised in nearby Westfield, Bagger attended Westfield High School. He received an A.B. in 1982 from the School of Public and International Affairs at Princeton University and a J.D. from Rutgers University School of Law.

Bagger served as a Planning Board member, Councilman, and Mayor of Westfield, New Jersey during the 1980s and 1990s. He was elected to the New Jersey General Assembly from the 22nd Legislative District in 1991, succeeding Chuck Hardwick, his longtime mentor. During his time as an assemblyman, he served as Chairman of the Appropriations Committee and was elected to be Majority Conference Leader. In 2000, he declined a race to succeed Bob Franks in Congress. In 2001, he was elected to the New Jersey Senate for the 21st Legislative District. He resigned as a State Senator in 2003 in order to pursue private business interests and was succeeded by Thomas Kean Jr. Bagger remained a political leader in Union County after leaving the legislature.

Earlier in his career, Bagger was an Assistant General Counsel to Horizon Blue Cross and Blue Shield of New Jersey and practiced law with the firm of McCarter and English. After leaving the Senate, he worked as Senior Vice President of Public Affairs and Policy for Pfizer. He also was a member of the NJN Foundation Board of Trustees as well as Board Chair of the Healthcare Institute of New Jersey and the National Pharmaceutical Council. In December 2009, then-Governor-elect Chris Christie appointed Bagger as his chief of staff. He served in that role until January 2012.

Bagger served on the Port Authority of New York and New Jersey Board of Commissioners, having been confirmed by the New Jersey State Senate on June 28, 2012 and remained on the Board until June 2021. He was Chair of the Gateway Program Development Corporation in 2017, served on the Board of the National September 11 Memorial and Museum while a Port Authority Commissioner, and joined the Board of the Regional Plan Association in 2022.

Bagger was Executive Director of the 2016 transition planning team of Donald Trump, after Chris Christie endorsed Trump and was named Chair of the planning group. After Christie was dropped by Trump as leader of the transition team in favor of Mike Pence, Bagger left the transition team on the same day. In May 2017, Bagger was appointed to the President's Commission on White House Fellowships and served there until 2021.

Bagger is also an adjunct faculty member of the Eagleton Institute at Rutgers University, and a Director of Tonix Pharmaceuticals, the Leukemia and Lymphoma Society, and the U.S. Chamber of Commerce.

== Election history ==
2001 New Jersey general election
Party	Candidate	Votes	%
Republican	Richard H. Bagger	41,539	58.6
Democratic	Ellen Steinberg	29,342	41.4
Total votes		70,881	100.0

New Jersey general election, 1999
Party	Candidate	Votes	%	±%
Republican	Richard H. Bagger	24,405	50.4	17.9
Republican	Alan M. Augustine	24,004	49.6	17.8
Total votes		48,409	100.0	

New Jersey general election, 1997
Party	Candidate	Votes	%	±%
Republican	Richard H. Bagger	43,421	32.5	3.3
Republican	Alan M. Augustine	42,479	31.8	3.3
Democratic	Andrew Baron	22,368	16.7	2.5
Democratic	Norman Albert	22,110	16.5	2.6
Conservative	Douglas Lawless	1,688	1.3	0.8
Conservative	Norman A. Ross	1,635	1.2	0.8
Total votes		133,701	100.0	

New Jersey general election, 1995
Party	Candidate	Votes	%	±%
Republican	Richard H. Bagger	24,024	29.2	3.8
Republican	Alan M. Augustine	23,520	28.5	3.3
Democratic	John A. Salerno	15,782	19.2	0.3
Democratic	Geri Samuel	15,737	19.1	2.8
Conservative	Robert Hudak	1,700	2.1	N/A
Conservative	Fred J. Grill	1,627	2.0	N/A
Total votes		82,390	100.0	

New Jersey general election, 1993
Party	Candidate	Votes	%	±%
Republican	Richard H. Bagger	47,064	33.0	4.5
Republican	Alan M. Augustine	45,357	31.8	6.1
Democratic	Susan H. Pepper	26,972	18.9	6.4
Democratic	Carlton W. Hansen, Jr.	23,252	16.3	4.1
Total votes		142,645	100.0	

1991 New Jersey general election
Party	Candidate	Votes	%
Republican	Bob Franks	37,087	37.9
Republican	Richard H. Bagger	36,704	37.5
Democratic	Edward Kahn	12,241	12.5
Democratic	Richard Kress	11,900	12.2
Total votes		97,932	100.0

Political offices
Preceded by Raymond Stone	Mayor of Westfield; 1991–1992	Succeeded by Garland Boothe
New Jersey General Assembly
Preceded by Maureen Ogden	Member of the New Jersey General Assembly from the 22nd district 1992–2002; Served alongside: Bob Franks, Alan Augustine, Tom Kean	Succeeded by Linda Stender
New Jersey Senate
Preceded by Kevin O'Toole	Member of the New Jersey Senate from the 21st district 2002–2003	Succeeded by Tom Kean
