= Frank B. Holman =

American politician

General Frank B. Holman (August 17, 1930 – December 2, 2005) was an American Republican Party politician from New Jersey and was an advisor to many of the party's candidates.

== Biography ==
Holman was born on August 17, 1930, and raised in Ocean County. He served as Mayor of Jackson, New Jersey, as Ocean County Administrator, as Executive Director of the New Jersey Republican State Committee, and as the Chairman of the New Jersey Republican State Committee. He was a brigadier general in the United States Air Force Reserve. Holman also served in the U.S. Air Force during the Korean War. He eventually retired from the Air Force Reserve as a brigadier general.

== Death ==
Holman died on Friday December 2, 2005, in Lakewood Township, New Jersey, at the age of 75. Wayne Pomanowski, a friend of Frank, stated that Holman died while being treated for throat cancer. Holman was a cigar smoker for years which led to his apparent death from throat cancer.

Party political offices
Preceded by Philip Kaltenbacher	Chairman of the New Jersey Republican State Committee; 1985–1987	Succeeded by Bob Franks
