= Linda S. Carter =

Member of the New Jersey General Assembly

Linda Carter
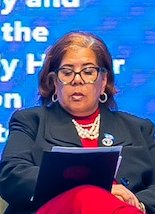

Member of the New Jersey General Assembly from the 22nd district
- Incumbent
- Assumed office May 24, 2018 Serving with James J. Kennedy
- Preceded by: Jerry Green

Personal details
- Born: April 1963 (age 62) Plainfield, New Jersey, U.S.
- Political party: Democratic
- Education: University of Maryland, Eastern Shore (BS); Stevens Institute of Technology (MS)
- Website: State Assembly website

Linda Carter (born April 1963) is an American Democratic Party politician. who has represented the 22nd Legislative District in the New Jersey General Assembly since taking office in 2018 to fill the seat that had been vacant following the death of Jerry Green.

== Political career ==
A resident of Plainfield, Carter served on the Board of Chosen Freeholders for Union County from January 1, 2011 to January 1, 2017, becoming the Board's chairwoman in 2013. She also served as a commissioner of the Middlesex County Utilities Authority, commissioner of the Raritan Valley Rail Coalition, and at-large councilwoman for the 1st and 4th wards in Plainfield. In June 2018, Rebecca Williams was appointed on an interim basis to fill the freeholder seat expiring in December 2019 that had been held by Carter.

== New Jersey Assembly ==
Carter was appointed in May 2018 to fill the vacant seat left following the death of Jerry Green the previous month after 26 years of service. Carter subsequently won the special election to serve the rest of Green's term on November 6, 2018.

=== Committees ===
Committee assignments for the 2024—2025 Legislative Session are:

- Higher Education (as chair)
- Transportation and Independent Authorities (as vice-chair)

=== District 22 ===
Each of the 40 districts in the New Jersey Legislature has one representative in the New Jersey Senate and two members in the New Jersey General Assembly. The representatives from the 22nd District for the 2024—2025 Legislative Session are:

- Senator Nicholas Scutari (D)
- Assemblywoman Linda S. Carter (D)
- Assemblyman James J. Kennedy (D)

=== Legislation ===
In the 2018-2019 legislative session, Carter was primary sponsor on the following bills signed into law:

- A-4073 Designates portion of State Highway Route 27 in Union County as "Jerry Green Memorial Highway."
- A-4705 Establishes New Jersey Food Waste Task Force to make recommendations concerning food waste in New Jersey.
- A-4936 Establishes maternal health care pilot program to evaluate shared decision-making tool developed by DOH and used by hospitals providing maternity services, and by birthing centers.

== Electoral history ==
=== New Jersey Assembly ===
22nd Legislative District General Election, 2023
Party	Candidate	Votes	%
Democratic	Linda Carter (incumbent)	23,710	33.3
Democratic	James Kennedy (incumbent)	23,123	32.5
Republican	Lisa Fabrizio	12,272	17.2
Republican	Patricia Quattrocchi	12,087	17.0
Total votes		71,192	100.0
Democratic hold			
Democratic hold			

22nd legislative district general election, 2021
Party	Candidate	Votes	%
Democratic	Linda Carter (incumbent)	32,267	31.26%
Democratic	James J. Kennedy (incumbent)	31,593	30.60%
Republican	David Sypher	19,825	19.20%
Republican	Hans Herberg	19,546	18.93%
Total votes		103,231	100.0
Democratic hold			

22nd Legislative District General Election, 2019
Party	Candidate	Votes	%
Democratic	Linda Carter (incumbent)	18,703	40.25%
Democratic	James Kennedy (incumbent)	18,099	38.95%
Republican	Patricia Quattrocchi	9,665	20.8%
Total votes		46,467	100%
Democratic hold			

Special election, November 6, 2018
Party	Candidate	Votes	%
Democratic	Linda Carter (Incumbent)	42,637	69.4
Republican	John Quattrocchi	18,831	30.6
Total votes		61,468	100.0
