= Bob Franks =

American politician (1951–2010)

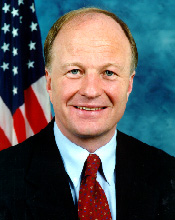

Member of the U.S. House of Representatives from New Jersey's 7th district
- In office January 3, 1993 – January 3, 2001
- Preceded by: Matt Rinaldo
- Succeeded by: Mike Ferguson

Member of the New Jersey General Assembly from the 22nd district
- In office January 8, 1980 – December 1, 1992 Serving with William J. Maguire and Maureen Ogden
- Preceded by: Donald DiFrancesco
- Succeeded by: Alan Augustine

Chair of the New Jersey Republican Party
- In office 1990–1992
- Preceded by: Kathleen Donovan
- Succeeded by: Virginia Littell
- In office 1987–1989
- Preceded by: Frank B. Holman
- Succeeded by: Kathleen Donovan

Personal details
- Born: Robert Douglas Franks; September 21, 1951 Hackensack, New Jersey, U.S.
- Died: April 9, 2010 (aged 58) New York City, New York, U.S.
- Party: Republican
- Spouse: Frances Smith
- Children: 3
- Education: DePauw University (BA); Southern Methodist University (JD)
- Occupation: Politician; political consultant

Robert Douglas Franks (September 21, 1951 – April 9, 2010) was an American Republican politician who served as a U.S. representative from New Jersey.

== Early life ==
Franks was born on September 21, 1951, in Hackensack, New Jersey, the son of Norman A. Franks (1921–2000) and June E. Franks. He grew up in Glen Rock, New Jersey before his family moved to suburban Chicago. They returned to New Jersey, where Franks attended Summit High School. He graduated from DePauw University in 1973 where he was President of the Student Senate, and from the Dedman School of Law at Southern Methodist University in 1976.

== Early political activities ==
He had been involved in Republican politics while growing up, including the races of Senator Charles H. Percy. As a teenager, he returned to his home state. While in Summit, he became involved with the Young Republicans and the Kean for Assembly races. Franks helped to found the Union County Young Republicans Franks then served as an aide, consultant and campaign manager to several congressman including Jim Courter and Dean Gallo as well as Governor Thomas Kean. The primary profession of Franks, however, was that of a newspaper publisher.

== New Jersey State Assemblyman ==
In 1979, Franks was a candidate for Union County Freeholder when State Senator Peter J. McDonough resigned. Assemblyman Donald DiFrancesco ran for the Senate, and Franks switched to the Assembly race. He defeated Marie Kissebeth, the Berkeley Heights mayor, at the Republican convention.

When he was redistricted into the 22nd Legislative District, a Union/Essex district in 1981 and Essex Republicans demanded an Assembly seat, Franks survived and the Union Republicans dumped another incumbent, William J. Maguire. He was re-elected in 1981, 1983, 1985, 1987, 1989 and 1991.

While in the Assembly, he also served two terms as chairman of the New Jersey Republican State Committee, 1987–89 and 1990–92. In the second term, finding widespread voter discontent with Governor Jim Florio's tax hikes, he led the Republican Party to winning veto-proof majorities in both houses of the Legislature.

He was succeeded in the Assembly by Alan Augustine.

== U.S. Congressman ==
In 1992, Franks was elected to the U. S. House of Representatives (succeeding Matt Rinaldo), and served four terms in the House from 1993 to 2001. While he was a congressman, he was a member of the Transportation Committee and involved with transportation issues. He was known as a budget "hawk" and was a strong supporter of the Contract with America, including voluntary terms limits.

Franks was the New Jersey campaign chairman for U.S. Rep. Jack Kemp in the campaign for the 1988 Republican presidential nomination. He endorsed New Jersey publisher Steve Forbes in 1996, and U.S. Rep. John Kasich in 2000. Franks and Kasich served together on the House Budget Committee and became close friends. Kasich is the godfather of Franks' eldest daughter, Kelly, and was one of the eulogizers at Franks' 2010 funeral.

=== 2000 U.S. Senate campaign ===
In 2000, Franks gave up his House seat (true to his "term limits" vow) to become the Republican candidate to the open Senate seat from New Jersey. However, he was defeated by Democrat Jon Corzine.

In this race Franks was far outspent by Corzine, a former CEO, by 48 million dollars, yet still was the closest the Republicans have come to winning a New Jersey United States Senate seat since Clifford Case won a fourth term re-election in 1972. Corzine defeated Franks by less than 100,000 votes and a vote percentage of 51.1% to 47.1% in the 2000 US Senate election.

=== 2001 gubernatorial campaign ===
He was defeated for the Republican nomination for New Jersey governor in 2001 by Bret Schundler, who ran on a more conservative platform. Franks entered the 2001 governor's race reluctantly, following the withdrawal of former Governor Donald DiFrancesco, after having previous announced that he would not be a candidate. It is believed this late start cost him the primary as Schundler had a big head start in campaigning and fundraising.

Jack Abramoff helped Schundler raise funds against Franks because of his refusal to hold off a "Made in the USA" bill that harmed Abramoff's clients in the Northern Marianas Islands despite assurances he wouldn't introduce the bill until further discussions occurred. The bill was introduced the next day without further discussions. Abramoff retaliated "He was running for governor. I raised a bunch of money for his opponent in the primary and made sure everyone knew I was doing it. He lost his primary. No other Republican tried to slap the CNMI while I was a lobbyist." Abramoff said in an interview.

Franks remained involved in New Jersey politics and was often mentioned as a potential candidate for high offices, but Franks discouraged such speculation. Many thought that his next public office, if any, would have been appointive.

Franks served as President of the Health Care Institute of New Jersey. There was speculation he might run again for Congress when his successor, Mike Ferguson, announced in 2007 that he would not seek reelection in 2008. However, Franks then declined to run, saying "Representing the people of Central New Jersey in the House of Representatives from 1993 to 2001 was one of the important and rewarding experiences of my life; however I find my work at the HealthCare Institute of New Jersey very fulfilling and I'm enjoying nights and weekends with my family... I have no desire to run for Congress next year."

== Death and legacy ==
A resident of Warren Township, Franks died of cancer at Memorial Sloan Kettering Hospital in New York City on April 9, 2010.

On September 24, 2013, at the dedication of a rail station in Union, New Jersey in honor of Franks, Gov. Chris Christie revealed that he had offered Franks the Republican nomination for Lt. Governor on his ticket in 2009, but that he was turned down. Christie then went to his second choice, Kim Guadagno.

== Electoral history ==
New Jersey's 7th congressional district: Results 1992–1998
Year	Democrat	Votes	Pct	Republican	Votes	Pct	3rd Party	Party	Votes	Pct		3rd Party	Party	Votes	Pct	3rd Party	Party	Votes	Pct	
1992	Leonard Sendelsky	105,761	42.6%	Bob Franks	132,174	53.3%	Eugene J. Gillespie	Independent	4,043	1.6%		Bill Campbell	No Nonsense Government	2,612	1.1%	Spencer Layman	Libertarian	1,964	0.8%	*
1994	Karen Carroll	64,231	38.7%	Bob Franks (incumbent)	98,814	59.6%	James J. Cleary	LaRouche Was Right	2,331	1.4%	*									
1996	Larry Lerner	97,285	41.83%	Bob Franks (incumbent)	128,821	55.39%	Dorothy DeLaura	Independent	4,076	1.75%		Nicholas Gentile	Independent	1,693	0.73%	Robert G. Robertson	Independent	696	0.30%	
1998	Maryanne Connelly	65,776	44%	Bob Franks (incumbent)	77,751	53%	Richard C. Martin	Independent	3,007	2%		Darren Young	Independent	1,508	1%					

Write-in and minor candidate notes: In 1992, John L. Kucek running as an America First Populist received 844 votes and Kevin Michael Criss running under People's Congressional Preference received 684 votes. In 1994, Claire Greene received 481 votes.

2000 U.S. Senate Race – Republican Primary
Candidate	Pct	Candidate	Pct	Candidate	Pct
Bob Franks	36%	William Gormley	34%	Others	30%

2000 United States Senate election, Senate Class 1, New Jersey
Party	Candidate	Votes	%	±%
Democratic	Jon S. Corzine	1,511,237	50	
Republican	Bob Franks	1,420,267	47	
Independent	Bruce Afran	32,841	1	
Independent	Pat DiNizio	19,312	1	
Independent	Emerson Ellett	7,241	<1%	
Independent	Dennis A. Breen	6,061	<1%	
Independent	J. M. Carter	5,657	<1%	
Independent	Lorraine LaNeve	3,836	<1%	
Independent	Gregory Pason	3,365	<1%	
Independent	Nancy Rosenstock	3,309	<1%	
Independent	George Gostigian	2,536	<1%	
Majority		90,970	3	
Democratic hold		Swing		

New Jersey General Assembly
Preceded by Donald DiFrancesco	Member of the New Jersey General Assembly from the 22nd district 1980–1992; Served alongside: William J. Maguire and Maureen Ogden	Succeeded by Alan Augustine
U.S. House of Representatives
Preceded by Matthew J. Rinaldo	Member of the U.S. House of Representatives from New Jersey's 7th congressional district 1993–2001	Succeeded by Mike Ferguson
Party political offices
Preceded by Frank B. Holman	Chairman of the New Jersey Republican Party; 1987–1989	Succeeded by Kathleen Donovan
Preceded by Kathleen Donovan	Chairman of the New Jersey Republican Party; 1990–1992	Succeeded by Virginia Littell
Preceded by Chuck Haytaian	Republican nominee for U.S. Senator from New Jersey (Class 1); 2000	Succeeded by Thomas Kean Jr.
