= Maureen Ogden =

American politician (1928–2022)

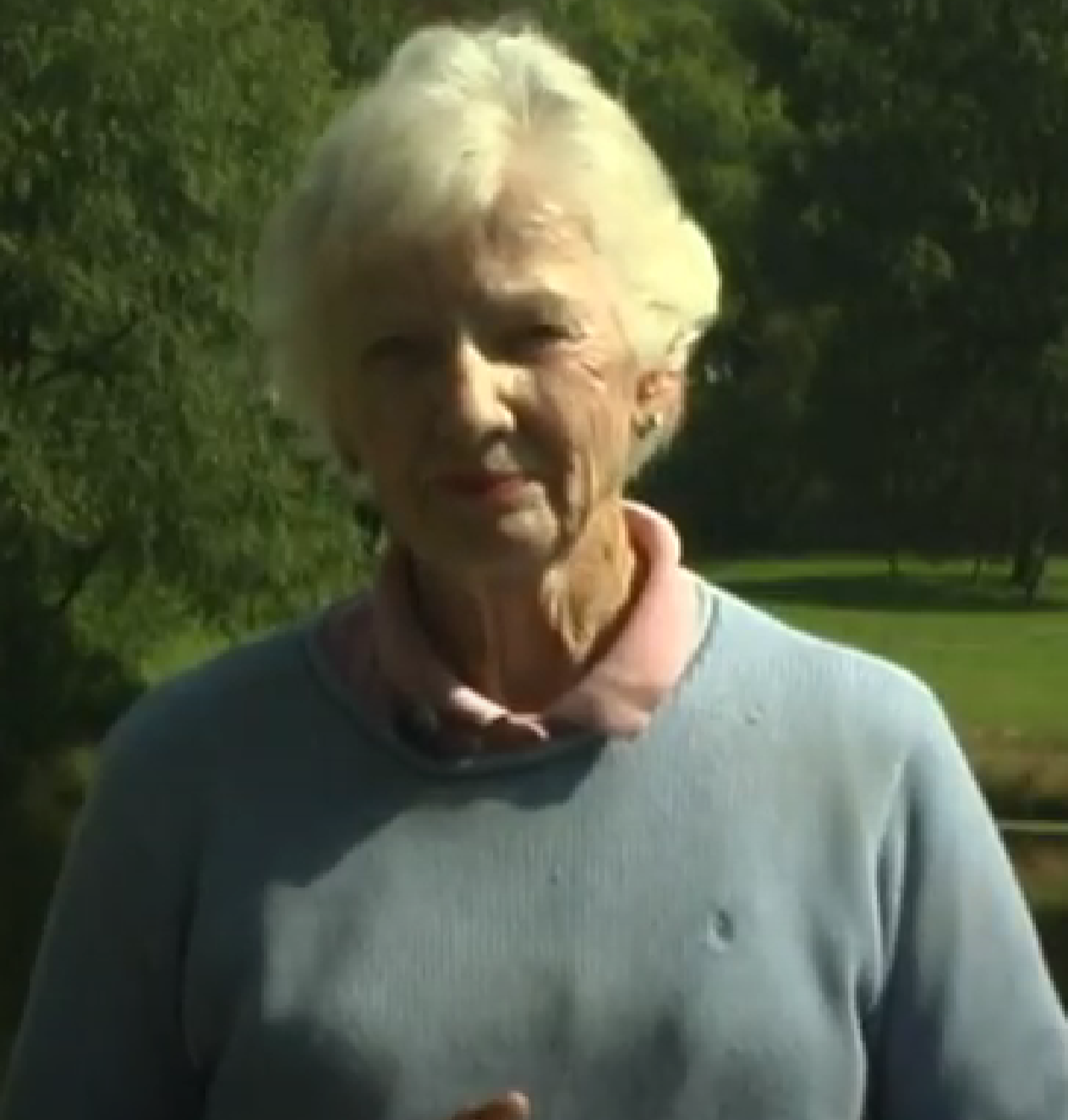
- Ogden in 2006

Member of the New Jersey General Assembly
- In office January 12, 1982 – January 9, 1996
- Preceded by: William J. Maguire
- Succeeded by: Kevin J. O'Toole
- Constituency: 22nd District (1982–1992)
- Constituency: 21st District (1992–1996)

Personal details
- Born: November 1, 1928 Vancouver, British Columbia, Canada
- Died: August 17, 2022 (aged 93)
- Party: Republican
- Spouse(s): Robert M. Ogden, III (died 2010)
- Children: 3
- Education: Smith College (BA); Columbia University (MA)

Maureen Black Ogden (November 1, 1928 – August 17, 2022) was an American Republican Party politician who served seven terms in the New Jersey General Assembly between 1982 and 1996. She represented the 22nd Legislative District for five terms until 1992 and then was shifted to the 21st Legislative District (in redistricting following the 1990 United States census) where she served two terms of office.

== Early life ==
Ogden was born in Vancouver, British Columbia, Canada, in 1928 and emigrated to the United States in 1930 with her family. Ogden attended the private all-girls Kent Place School in Summit, New Jersey. She graduated with a Bachelor of Arts degree from Smith College in 1950 and earned a Master of Arts from Columbia University in 1963.

== Career ==
Ogden served as deputy mayor of Millburn, New Jersey from 1976 to 1979 and was its mayor from 1979 to 1981.

Ogden was elected to the New Jersey General Assembly to represent the 22nd District in 1981 with running mate Bob Franks and the two were re-elected to four terms of office together in 1983, 1985, 1987 and 1989. She was redistricted to the 21st District following the results of the 1990 Census, and was elected to two terms there with running mate Monroe Jay Lustbader. She served in the Assembly as Assistant Minority Whip from 1982 to 1985. During her tenure in the Assembly, she served as Chair of the Committee on Conservation, Energy and Natural Resources, Chair of the Committee on Arts, Tourism, and Cultural Affairs, as Vice Chair of the Financial Institutions Committee and the Drug Abuse Committee, and as a member of the Health Committee, the Conservation and Natural Resources Committee, the New Jersey State Council on the Arts and on the State Government Committee.

In 1992, Ogden co-sponsored a bill with Robert C. Shinn, Jr. that would make New Jersey the first state in the nation to require its entire fleet of motor vehicles to use remanufactured or retread tires, which Ogden cited as a way to keep tires out of the waste stream.

Legislation supported by Ogden in 1994 created a $350 million fund that would be used to preserve open space, with the money going to acquire open space and for farmland and historic preservation. That same year, Ogden was chief sponsor of a bill in the General Assembly that would give adoptees the opportunity to get access to their original birth certificates. Ogden's original opinion had been to limit such access out of fear that adoptive parents would lose their children if they found out that they had been adopted, but changed her mind after realizing "that the basic rights of the little babies were not being considered".

As chair of the Governor's Council on New Jersey Outdoors in 1998, Ogden targeted raising $1 billion over the subsequent decade to be used to preserve 1 million acres (4,000 km^{2}) of farmland and open space.

== Personal life ==
She was married to Bob Ogden, who died in 2010, and they had three children, including former Summit councilman, Henry Ogden. Ogden died on August 17, 2022, at the age of 93.

== Electoral history ==
=== New Jersey General Assembly ===
21st Legislative District general election, 1991
| Party | Candidate | Votes | % |
|---|---|---|---|
| Republican | Maureen Ogden | 34,282 | 32.4 |
| Republican | Monroe Jay Lustbader | 33,914 | 32.06 |
| Democratic | Neil M. Cohen (incumbent) | 20,460 | 19.34 |
| Democratic | Frank Covello | 15,928 | 15.06 |
| Populist | Bill Ciccone | 1,212 | 1.15 |
| Total votes | | 105,796 | 100 |

New Jersey General Assembly
| Preceded by William J. Maguire | Member of the New Jersey General Assembly from the 22nd district January 12, 1982 – January 14, 1992 | Succeeded by Richard Bagger |
| Preceded by Chuck Hardwick | Member of the New Jersey General Assembly from the 21st district January 14, 1992 – January 9, 1996 | Succeeded by Kevin J. O'Toole |
