= William J. Maguire =

American politician

William J. Maguire (June 12, 1916 – October 2, 1997) was an American Republican Party politician who served in the New Jersey General Assembly from 1976 to 1982.

== Early life and education ==
Born in North Attleborough, Massachusetts, Maguire attended Barringer High School and Rutgers University.

== Political career ==
He served as Mayor of Clark, New Jersey from 1960 to 1968 and as a member of the Union County Board of Chosen Freeholders from 1970 to 1976. Maguire was elected to the State Assembly in 1975, running with future Governor Donald DiFrancesco; they defeated incumbent Democrat Betty Wilson and her running mate, William A. Wolf, the Rahway Democratic Municipal Chairman. He was re-elected in 1977. Following the resignation of State Senator Peter J. McDonough in 1979, Maguire ran for the State Senate, but lost a vote of a Republican convention to DiFrancesco. He was re-elected to the Assembly, with future Congressman Bob Franks as his running mate. Maguire's political career came to an end in 1981, when redistricting traded Democratic towns in Union County for solid Republican towns in Essex County. DiFrancesco was facing a primary challenge from an Essex County Republican; to secure the Essex organization line in a district where Republican primary election voters were evenly split between Essex and Union, DiFrancesco agreed to put an Essex Republican on his ticket. John Renna, the Essex Republican Chairman, preferred that Franks (who had worked on Renna's 1977 bid for County Chairman), get the second Assembly seat. Maguire, replaced by Millburn Mayor Maureen Ogden, did not run for re-election.
