= Nicholas Scutari =

American politician (born 1968)

Nick Scutari

President of the New Jersey Senate
- Incumbent
- Assumed office January 11, 2022
- Preceded by: Stephen Sweeney

Member of the New Jersey Senate from the 22nd district
- Incumbent
- Assumed office January 13, 2004
- Preceded by: Joseph Suliga

Personal details
- Born: Nicholas Paul Scutari; November 18, 1968 (age 57) Newark, New Jersey, U.S.
- Party: Democratic
- Education: Union College (attended); Kean University (BA); Rutgers University, New Brunswick (MEd); Western Michigan University (JD)
- Website: State Senate website

Nicholas Paul Scutari (born November 18, 1968) is an American politician and attorney who has served as the 115th president of the New Jersey Senate since 2022. A member of the Democratic Party, he has held a Senate seat since 2004, representing the 22nd legislative district. Scutari has served as Acting Governor of New Jersey on multiple occasions, the first time being in June 2022 and most recently in October 2026.

== Early life ==
Scutari attended Union County College, received a B.A. from Kean University in Psychology, an Ed.M. from Rutgers University in Education and a J.D. from the Western Michigan University Cooley Law School. He is an attorney with the Law Offices of Nicholas P. Scutari.

== Political career ==
Before his election to the New Jersey Senate, Scutari was a member of the Union County Board of Chosen Freeholders, where he became the youngest freeholder chairman in county history. He served as freeholder chairman in 1999, after serving a year as freeholder vice chairman. Prior to being a freeholder, he served as a member of the board of education of the Linden Public Schools.

== New Jersey Senate ==
He was nominated for the Senate after Senator Joseph Suliga announced that he would not seek re-election after a female casino employee in Atlantic City accused him of sexual harassment.

Scutari has served on the State Government Committee (as the chair), the Joint State Leasing and Space Utilization Committee, the Commerce Committee and the Judiciary Committee. Scutari held the role of chair of the New Jersey Senate Judiciary Committee for the longest period in modern history. He is a former commissioner of the New Jersey Clean Elections Commission. He is also a former vice chairman of the Senate Education Committee. He is President of the New Jersey Senate. Scutari was the chief sponsor of New Jersey's Medical Marijuana law that was signed into law in 2009 and has been an advocate for the effort to legalize marijuana for all individuals over the age of 21. After a bill he introduced failed in 2014, Scutari introduced a bill in May 2017 to legalize, regulate and tax recreational marijuana use; while then-Governor of New Jersey Chris Christie was vigorously opposed to the measure, incoming governor Phil Murphy had announced that he would support legalization.

=== Committees ===
Committee assignments for the 2024—2025 Legislative Session are:

- Joint State Leasing and Space Utilization Committee

=== District 22 ===
Each of the 40 districts in the New Jersey Legislature has one representative in the New Jersey Senate and two members in the New Jersey General Assembly. The representatives from the 22nd District for the 2024—2025 Legislative Session are:

- Senator Nicholas Scutari (D)
- Assemblywoman Linda S. Carter (D)
- Assemblyman James J. Kennedy (D)

=== Acting Governor ===
On June 4, 2022, Scutari, in his capacity as the Senate president, became acting governor of New Jersey as both Governor Phil Murphy and Lieutenant Governor Sheila Oliver were out of state on personal trips. He became acting governor for 15 days on July 31, 2023, when Murphy was out of state and Oliver was hospitalized for an illness, from which she died the following day. With Governor Murphy attending a meeting of the Democratic Governors Association in Colorado in late August 2023, Scutari served in his absence as acting governor for the third time.

In August 2024, while Governor Murphy and Lieutenant Governor Taheshea Way were out of state for the 2024 Democratic National Convention, Scutari passed four bills as acting president, including a bill that raises the cap on attorney fees in workers’ compensation cases from 20% to 25%, as well as another that gives raises to appellate judges and county prosecutors. This raised concerns because Scutari’s law firm works in these cases. Other bills passed included the designation of the interchange between State Highway 42 and Interstate 295 as Ensign John R. Elliott Memorial Interchange; a bill that directs the New Jersey Department of Community Affairs to establish a self-certification program allows architects and engineers to self-certify as design professionals; and a bill that allows members of the Police and Firemen’s Retirement System to purchase credit for service as a class two special law enforcement officer.

== Linden municipal prosecutor ==
Scutari served for about fifteen years as municipal prosecutor in the City of Linden. In January 2019, the city council voted to remove him from the position following an ongoing feud with city leadership over his job attendance and reliance on substitute prosecutors.

The city retained the Newark law firm Calcagni & Kanefsky LLP to review the prosecutor's office. Its October 2019 report alleged that Scutari attended fewer than half of his scheduled municipal court sessions, that cases were dismissed as a result of absences, and that the need for substitutes and related costs added more than $200,000 in expenses for the city. The review also noted that Linden taxpayers continued contributing to Scutari’s pension during this period.

Scutari denied wrongdoing, calling the report politically motivated, and said a 2005 city memorandum authorized him to retain and personally pay substitute prosecutors when absent. In early 2019 Linden Mayor Derek Armstead publicly requested that U.S. Attorney Craig Carpenito investigate the matter, and in March 2020 *NorthJersey.com* reported that prosecutors had subpoenaed records related to Scutari’s work as prosecutor. Activists later urged an ethics investigation and compared the controversy to the 2008 conviction of former state senator Wayne Bryant for “no-show job” arrangements, though Scutari was not charged with any crime.

In October 2020 Scutari filed a $10 million lawsuit against Mayor Armstead and several council members, alleging defamation, libel, slander, and malicious prosecution.

== Family ==
In Italy, his cousin Donato Scutari, a member of the Italian Communist Party, was elected Deputy and Senator of the Italian Republic. His uncle, Anthony Scutari, was chair of the Union County Improvement Authority.

== Electoral history ==
=== New Jersey Senate ===
22nd Legislative District General Election, 2023
Party	Candidate	Votes	%
Democratic	Nicholas P. Scutari (incumbent)	23,876	66.2
Republican	William H. Michelson	12,189	33.8
Total votes		36,065	100.0
Democratic hold			

New Jersey general election, 2021
Party	Candidate	Votes	%	±%
Democratic	Nicholas Scutari (Incumbent)	32,044	61.5	▼5.8
Republican	William H. Michelson	20,100	38.5	▲5.8
Total votes		52,144	100.0	

New Jersey general election, 2017
Party	Candidate	Votes	%	±%
Democratic	Nicholas Scutari (Incumbent)	29,563	67.3	▲7.8
Republican	Joseph A. Bonilla	14,362	32.7	▼7.8
Total votes		43,925	100.0	

New Jersey State Senate elections, 2013
Party	Candidate	Votes	%
Democratic	Nicholas Scutari (Incumbent)	24,899	59.5
Republican	Robert M. Sherr	16,933	40.5
Democratic hold			

New Jersey State Senate elections, 2011
Party	Candidate	Votes	%
Democratic	Nicholas Scutari (Incumbent)	16,104	61.6
Republican	Michael W. Class	10,024	38.4
Democratic hold			

New Jersey State Senate elections, 2007
Party	Candidate	Votes	%
Democratic	Nicholas Scutari (Incumbent)	14,711	56.9
Republican	Rose McConnell	11,139	43.1
Democratic hold			

New Jersey State Senate elections, 2003
Party	Candidate	Votes	%
Democratic	Nicholas Scutari	16,658	55.0
Republican	Martin Marks	13,609	45.0
Democratic hold			

Political offices
Preceded by Stephen Sweeney	President of the New Jersey Senate; 2022–present	Incumbent
