= 1973 New Jersey Senate election =

- November 6, 1973

All 40 seats in the New Jersey State Senate 21 seats needed for a majority
- Turnout: 61% (▼1pp)
	Majority party	Minority party	Third party
Leader	J. Edward Crabiel (retired)	Alfred Beadleston (redistricted)
Party	Democratic	Republican	Independent
Leader's seat	7th (Milltown)	5th (Rumson)
Last election	16	24	0
Seats before	17	21	0
Seats won	29	10	1
Seat change	▲12	▼11	▲1
Popular vote	1,155,305	821,858
Percentage	57.5%	40.9%
- Results by district Democratic hold Democratic gain Republican hold Republican gain Independent gain
Senate President before election
Alfred Beadleston
Republican
Elected Senate President
Frank J. Dodd
Democratic

The 1973 New Jersey Senate elections were held on November 6. The result of the elections were large gains for the Democratic Party, which won control of the Senate. The party picked up twelve seats. This election marked the first time since 1967 that Democrats controlled the State Senate. Republicans would not regain control of the State Senate until 1991.

The election coincided with Brendan Byrne's landslide re-election over Republican Charles W. Sandman Jr. The election also took place amidst the height of the Watergate scandal, just weeks after the Saturday Night Massacre.

This was also the first New Jersey Senate election held using single-member districts, as the state completed its long transition following the 1964 Reynolds v. Sims decision. As of 2022, it remains the largest single change in seats for Democrats or any party since single-member districts were adopted. This remains the greatest number of seats held by the Democrats or any party since the adoption of single-member districts.

Democrats chose Frank J. Dodd as the Senate President and Matthew Feldman as Majority Leader; Republicans named the outgoing Senate President, Alfred Beadleston as Minority Leader.

== Background ==
The new 1973 districts after redistricting, the first under the modern New Jersey districting standard.

=== Redistricting ===
Until 1965, the New Jersey State Senate was composed of 21 senators, with each county electing one senator. After the U.S. Supreme Court, in Reynolds v. Sims (more commonly known as One Man, One Vote), required redistricting by state legislatures for congressional districts to keep represented populations equal, as well as requiring both houses of state legislatures to have districts drawn that contained roughly equal populations, and to perform redistricting when needed. In 1965, the Senate was increased from 21 members to 29 members, and larger counties were given more than one seat, and some smaller counties shared one or two senators. The map was changed again in 1967, and again in 1971, as the state adjusted to the one-man, one-vote ruling.

For the first time, the state was to be divided into 40 legislative districts, with each district electing one State Senator and two members of the General Assembly. The districts were drawn first to achieve a population balance (districts were drawn to be within +/- 4% of each other), and then to be as geographically compact as possible.

For the most part, incumbent senators were given their own districts in which to run, with one exception. Senators William J. Bate and Joseph Hirkala, both of Passaic County (District 14), were re-districted into the same district, numbered 34. Bate successfully ran for Assembly rather than challenge Hirkala.

== Incumbents not running for re-election ==
=== Democratic ===
- J. Edward Crabiel, Middlesex (District 18) (ran for Governor)
- Norman Tanzman, Middlesex (District 19)
- Ralph DeRose, Essex (District 28) (ran for Governor)
- William J. Bate, Passaic (District 30) (redistricted; ran for Assembly)
- William F. Kelly Jr., Hudson (District 32)

=== Republican ===
- Frank Italiano, Camden (District 5)
- John F. Brown, Ocean (District 9)
- Peter W. Thomas, Morris (District 24)
- Harold C. Hollenbeck, Bergen (District 36)
- Alfred D. Schiaffo, Bergen (District 39)

Two incumbent Republican senators were elected to Congress in 1972 and resigned in January 1973 to take their seats in the U.S. House of Representatives. Both seats were won by Democrats:

- District 21: Matthew John Rinaldo was succeeded by Democrat Thomas Dunn, the Mayor of Elizabeth.
- District 23: Joseph Maraziti was succeeded by Democrat Stephen Wiley, a Morristown attorney.

== Incumbents defeated ==
=== In primary elections ===
==== Republicans ====
One incumbent Republican Senator was defeated for renomination in the June primary and Republicans held that seat:

- District 22: Jerome Epstein (R-Union), succeeded by Republican Peter J. McDonough, an Assemblyman from Union County. McDonough won 60%-40% over the incumbent, who was facing an indictment.

=== In general elections ===
==== Democrats ====
- District 35: Joseph Lazzara (D-Passaic) lost to Republican Frank Davenport, the Passaic County Sheriff.

==== Republicans ====
- District 6: John L. Miller (R-Camden) lost to Democrat Alene Ammond.
- District 10: Richard Stout (R-Monmouth) lost to Democrat Herbert Buehler.
- District 12: Joseph Azzolina (R-Monmouth) lost to Democrat Eugene Bedell, an Assemblyman from Monmouth County.
- District 14: William Schluter (R-Mercer) lost to Democrat Anne Clark Martindell. the Vice Chairwoman of the New Jersey Democratic State Committee.
- District 20: Frank X. McDermott (R-Union) lost to Democrat Alexander J. Menza, an Assemblyman from Union County.
- District 27: Michael Giuliano (R-Essex) lost to Democrat Carmen Orechio, the Mayor of Nutley.
- District 37: Joseph Woodcock (R-Bergen) lost to Democrat Matthew Feldman. a former State Senator and the Bergen County Democratic Chairman.
- District 38: Frederick Wendel (R-Bergen) lost to Democrat John Skevin, a former Assemblyman from Bergen County.

== Open seats ==
=== Democratic gains ===
- District 5: Frank Italiano (R-Camden), succeeded by Democrat John Horn, the Assembly Minority Leader, from Camden County.
- District 9: John F. Brown (R-Ocean), succeeded by Democrat John F. Russo, a former Ocean County Prosecutor.
- District 36: Harold Hollenbeck (R-Bergen), succeeded by Democrat Anthony Scardino, the Mayor of Lyndhurst.
- District 39: Alfred Schiaffo (R-Bergen), succeeded by Raymond Garramone, the Mayor of Haworth.

=== Independent gain ===
- District 30: William Bate (D-Passaic), succeeded by Independent Anthony Imperiale, an Assemblyman from Essex County. (Bate was redistricted into District 34, where Democrat Joseph Hirkala lived; instead of challenging Hirkala in the primary, he instead ran successfully for the State Assembly.)

=== Democratic holds ===
- District 18: J. Edward Crabiel (D-Middlesex), who briefly sought the 1973 Democratic nomination for Governor, succeeded by Democrat Bernard Dwyer, the Mayor of Edison.
- District 19: Norman Tanzman (D-Middlesex), succeeded by Democrat John Fay, an Assemblyman from Middlesex County.
- District 28: Ralph DeRose (D-Essex), who lost to Brendan Byrne in the Democratic gubernatorial primary, was succeeded by Democrat Martin L. Greenberg, who was Byrne's law partner.
- District 32: William F. Kelly, Jr. (D-Hudson), succeeded by Democrat Joseph W. Tumulty.

=== Republican hold ===
- District 24: Peter W. Thomas (R-Morris), succeeded by Republican James P. Vreeland, an Assemblyman from Morris County.

== Summary of results by State Senate District ==
1972–74 District	Incumbent	Party	New District	Elected Senator	Party
District 1	James Cafiero	Rep	1st Legislative District	James Cafiero	Rep
District 2	Joseph McGahn	Dem	2nd Legislative District	Joseph McGahn	Dem
District 3A	Vacant (Note: Senator James M. Turner was forced to resign from his seat on June 28 after his conviction for a conspiracy to place drugs in the home of Democrat Kenneth A. Gewertz. He remained in the race.)		3rd Legislative District	Raymond Zane	Dem
District 3B	Joseph Maressa	Dem	4th Legislative District	Joseph Maressa	Dem
District 3D	Frank Italiano	Rep	5th Legislative District	John Horn	Dem
District 3C	John L. Miller	Rep	6th Legislative District	Alene Ammond	Dem
District 4C	Edward J. Hughes	Dem	7th Legislative District	Edward J. Hughes	Dem
District 4B	Barry T. Parker	Rep	8th Legislative District	Barry T. Parker	Rep
District 4A	John F. Brown	Rep	9th Legislative District	John F. Russo	Dem
District 5	Richard Stout	Rep	10th Legislative District	Herbert Buehler	Dem
District 5	Alfred Beadleston	Rep	11th Legislative District	Alfred Beadleston	Rep
District 5	Joseph Azzolina	Rep	12th Legislative District	Eugene Bedell	Dem
District 6B	Joseph P. Merlino	Dem	13th Legislative District	Joseph P. Merlino	Dem
District 6A	William Schluter	Rep	14th Legislative District	Anne Clark Martindell	Dem
District 15	Wayne Dumont Jr.	Rep	15th Legislative District	Wayne Dumont Jr.	Rep
District 8	Raymond Bateman	Rep	16th Legislative District	Raymond Bateman	Rep
District 7	John A. Lynch Sr.	Dem	17th Legislative District	John A. Lynch Sr.	Dem
District 7	J. Edward Crabiel	Dem	18th Legislative District	Bernard Dwyer	Dem
District 7	Norman Tanzman	Dem	19th Legislative District	John Fay	Dem
District 9	Frank X. McDermott	Rep	20th Legislative District	Alexander J. Menza	Dem
District 9	Thomas G. Dunn (Note: Dunn entered the Senate on January 9 to fill the vacancy left by the election of Congressman Matthew Rinaldo.)	Dem	21st Legislative District	Thomas G. Dunn	Dem
District 9	Jerome Epstein	Rep	22nd Legislative District	Peter J. McDonough	Rep
District 10	Vacant (Note: The Morris County seat had been vacant since Joseph Maraziti was sworn into Congress in January 1973. Wiley ran for and won a simultaneous special election to complete Maraziti's term.)		23rd Legislative District	Stephen B. Wiley	Dem
District 10	Peter W. Thomas	Rep	24th Legislative District	James P. Vreeland	Rep
District 11	James H. Wallwork	Rep	25th Legislative District	James H. Wallwork	Rep
District 11	Frank J. Dodd	Dem	26th Legislative District	Frank J. Dodd	Dem
District 11	Michael Giuliano	Rep	27th Legislative District	Carmen Orechio	Dem
District 11	Ralph DeRose	Dem	28th Legislative District	Martin L. Greenberg	Dem
District 11	Wynona Lipman	Dem	29th Legislative District	Wynona Lipman	Dem
District 11	N/A		30th Legislative District	Anthony Imperiale	Ind
District 12	James P. Dugan	Dem	31st Legislative District	James P. Dugan	Dem
District 12	William F. Kelly Jr.	Dem	32nd Legislative District	Joseph W. Tumulty	Dem
District 12	William Musto	Dem	33rd Legislative District	William Musto	Dem
District 14	Joseph Hirkala	Dem	34th Legislative District	Joseph Hirkala	Dem
District 14	William J. Bate	Dem	34th Legislative District	Joseph Hirkala	Dem
District 14	Joseph Lazzara	Dem	35th Legislative District	Frank Davenport	Rep
District 13	Harold Hollenbeck	Rep	36th Legislative District	Anthony Scardino	Dem
District 13	Joseph Woodcock	Rep	37th Legislative District	Matthew Feldman	Dem
District 13	Frederick Wendel	Rep	38th Legislative District	John Skevin	Dem
District 13	Alfred Schiaffo	Rep	39th Legislative District	Raymond Garramone	Dem
District 13	Garrett Hagedorn	Rep	40th Legislative District	Garrett Hagedorn	Rep

=== Close races ===
Seats where the margin of victory was under 10%:

1. District 35, 0.28% gain
2. District 14, 3.06% gain
3. District 22, 4.64%
4. District 24, 5.24%
5. District 38, 5.29% gain
6. District 8, 5.64%
7. District 23, 6.12% gain
8. District 27, 6.18% gain
9. District 6, 6.32% gain
10. District 11, 8.10%
11. District 25, 8.48%
12. District 39, 8.58% gain
13. District 9, 9.06% gain
14. District 15, 9.98%

== District 1 ==
=== Republican primary ===
==== Results ====
Republican primary
Party	Candidate	Votes	%
Republican	James S. Cafiero	15,580	100.00%
Total votes		15,580	100.00%

=== Democratic primary ===
==== Results ====
Democratic primary
Party	Candidate	Votes	%
Democratic	William R. Bowen	3,774	100.00%
Total votes		3,774	100.00%

=== General election ===
==== Candidates ====
- William E. Bowen, director of the Bridgeton Housing Authority and former City Councilman
- James S. Cafiero, incumbent Senator

==== Results ====
1st Legislative District
Party	Candidate	Votes	%
Republican	James S. Cafiero (incumbent)	34,807	58.26%
Democratic	William E. Bowen	24,933	41.74%
Total votes		59,740	100.00%

== District 2 ==
This district consisted of most of Atlantic County, as well as Little Egg Harbor Township, Tuckerton, and rural parts of Burlington County within the Pine Barrens.

=== Republican primary ===
==== Candidates ====
- Irving A. Lilienfeld, Atlantic County Freeholder
- F. Frederick Perone, former Atlantic City municipal judge

==== Results ====
Republican primary
Party	Candidate	Votes	%
Republican	Irving Lilienfeld	12,832	60.23%
Republican	F. Frederick Perone	8,474	39.77%
Total votes		21,306	100.00%

=== Democratic primary ===
==== Candidates ====
- Michael J. Matthews, Atlantic County Freeholder
- Joseph McGahn, incumbent Senator

==== Results ====
Democratic primary
Party	Candidate	Votes	%
Democratic	Joseph McGahn (incumbent)	3,498	50.36%
Democratic	Michael J. Matthews	3,448	49.64%
Total votes		6,946	100.00%

=== General election ===
==== Candidates ====
- Irving A. Lilienfeld, Atlantic County Freeholder (Republican)
- Joseph McGahn, incumbent Senator (Democratic)

==== Campaign ====
Both candidates supported a statewide referendum on legalized gambling. Lilienfeld and his running mates supported a statewide coordinated mass transit program, while the Democratic ticket supported a county-wide transportation program. The Republicans also emphasized crackdowns on welfare fraud and stricter drug control, while the Democrats campaigned to attract more light industry to the region.

==== Results ====
2nd Legislative District
Party	Candidate	Votes	%
Democratic	Joseph McGahn (incumbent)	32,043	55.09%
Republican	Irving A. Lilienfeld	26,120	44.91%
Total votes		58,163	100.00%

== District 3 ==
=== Republican primary ===
==== Candidates ====
- Robert E. Boakes, Woodbury attorney and former municipal judge
- Walter Fish, Gloucester County Sheriff (write-in)
- James M. Turner, incumbent Senator (until June 28)

===== Declined =====
- Kenneth A. Black Jr., Assemblyman from Salem County
- David Stroud, Woodbury attorney

==== Campaign ====
Turner was removed from his seat on June 28 after his conviction for conspiracy to place 6,500 amphetamine tablets in the home of Kenneth A. Gewertz, the Democratic Assemblyman from the district. He was sentenced to five years in prison.

The conviction barred Turner from holding state office. Nevertheless, Turner remained in the race, saying "I intend to win, and I expect the Senate to seat me."

Because it was too late to remove Turner from the ballot, an appeal was made to remove him, which a judge denied. The Republican Party attempted to run a write-in campaign for Gloucester Sheriff Walter Fish instead.

==== Results ====
Republican primary
Party	Candidate	Votes	%
Republican	James Turner (incumbent)	5,545	41.07%
Republican	Walter E. Fish Jr. (write-in)	4,678	34.65%
Republican	Robert E. Boakes	3,277	24.27%
Total votes		13,500	100.00%

=== Democratic primary ===
==== Candidates ====
- Raymond Zane, Gloucester County Freeholder

==== Results ====
Democratic primary
Party	Candidate	Votes	%
Democratic	Raymond Zane	6,834	100.00%
Total votes		6,834	100.00%

=== General election ===
==== Results ====
3rd Legislative District
Party	Candidate	Votes	%
Democratic	Raymond Zane	34,266	79.94%
Republican	James Turner (incumbent)	8,598	20.06%
Total votes		42,864	100.00%

== District 4 ==
=== Republican primary ===
==== Results ====
Republican primary
Party	Candidate	Votes	%
Republican	Thomas E. Jenkins	5,173	100.00%
Total votes		5,173	100.00%

=== Democratic primary ===
==== Candidates ====
- Joseph A. Maressa, incumbent Senator
- Robert W. Yost, Gloucester Township registrar of deeds

Yost was backed by Angelo Errichetti and Jack Gasparre, the mayor of Cherry Hill.

==== Results ====
Democratic primary
Party	Candidate	Votes	%
Democratic	Joseph A. Maressa (incumbent)	7,533	69.12%
Democratic	Robert W. Yost	3,366	30.88%
Total votes		10,899	100.00%

=== General election ===
==== Results ====
4th Legislative District
Party	Candidate	Votes	%
Democratic	Joseph A. Maressa	31,729	63.79%
Republican	Thomas E. Jenkins	18,012	36.21%
Total votes		49,741	100.00%

== District 5 ==
=== Republican primary ===
==== Candidates ====
===== Declined =====
- Frank Italiano, incumbent Senator

==== Results ====
Republican primary
Party	Candidate	Votes	%
Republican	Richard C. Hardenbergh	4,794	100.00%
Total votes		4,794	100.00%

=== Democratic primary ===
==== Candidates ====
- John J. Horn, Assembly Minority Leader

===== Declined =====
- James Florio, Assemblyman

==== Results ====
Democratic primary
Party	Candidate	Votes	%
Democratic	John J. Horn	6,680	100.00%
Total votes		6,680	100.00%

=== General election ===
5th Legislative District
Party	Candidate	Votes	%
Democratic	John J. Horn	25,999	65.20%
Republican	Richard C. Hardenberg	13,509	33.88%
Socialist Labor	Dominic W. Doganiero	369	0.93%
Total votes		39,877	100.00%

== District 6 ==
=== Republican primary ===
==== Candidates ====
- John L. Miller, incumbent Senator

===== Declined =====
- William K. Dickey, Assemblyman from Collingswood

==== Results ====
Republican primary
Party	Candidate	Votes	%
Republican	John L. Miller (incumbent)	10,857	100.00%
Total votes		10,857	100.00%

=== Democratic primary ===
==== Candidates ====
- Alene Ammond, candidate for Cherry Hill City Council in 1967
- John P. Jehl, Voorhees attorney and former assistant Camden County prosecutor

The Democratic primary was part of a countywide power struggle between party chair James Joyce and Cherry Hill party leader Jack Gasparre, who was also backed by Angelo Errichetti, the leader of the Camden Democratic organization and the mayor-elect. The camps were also divided in their choices for Governor; Gasparre and Errichetti backed Brendan Byrne, while Joyce backed Ralph DeRose. As a corollary to their fight over control of the party, Gasparre backed a separate slate of legislative candidates in this and other districts. Although the sixth district was heavily Republican, it was considered crucial because it centered on Cherry Hill, and Gasparre considered it his home base. To counter Gasparre's ticket, Joyce recruited Alene Ammond, a political gadfly who had run an unsuccessful campaign for Cherry Hill council in 1967 and whose proposal to reorganize the Cherry Hill government was rejected by voters in 1972.

Ammond campaigned against Jehl as a puppet of Errichetti, whom she charged with bossism and corruption; the Gasparre ticket made the same accusations of Joyce. All candidates indicated varying opposition to a static income tax; Ammond and Jehl disagreed on casino gambling, with Jehl supporting its legalization in some areas if approved by voters and Ammond outright opposing its legalization. Ammond also came out in support of a deepwater oil port, despite Ralph DeRose's vote against it.

==== Results ====
Democratic primary
Party	Candidate	Votes	%
Democratic	Alene Ammond	4,361	53.07%
Democratic	John P. Jehl	3,857	46.93%
Total votes		8,218	100.00%

=== General election ===
Although the district was considered safely Republican after the Republican majority was increased to 8,600 votes by redistricting, Ammond won an upset over Senator Miller.

6th Legislative District
Party	Candidate	Votes	%
Democratic	Alene Ammond	27,320	53.16%
Republican	John L. Miller (incumbent)	24,072	46.84%
Total votes		51,392	100.00%

== District 7 ==
=== Republican primary ===
==== Results ====
Republican primary
Party	Candidate	Votes	%
Republican	Walter L. Smith Jr.	7,544	100.00%
Total votes		7,544	100.00%

=== Democratic primary ===
==== Results ====
Democratic primary
Party	Candidate	Votes	%
Democratic	Edward J. Hughes Jr. (incumbent)	6,420	100.00%
Total votes		6,420	100.00%

=== General election ===
==== Candidates ====
- Bernardo Doganiero, perennial candidate (Socialist Labor)
- Edward J. Hughes Jr., incumbent Senator (Democratic)
- Walter L. Smith Jr., former Senator (Republican)

This race was a rematch of the 1971 contest between Hughes and Smith; Hughes won by an increased majority despite redistricting making the district more Republican and Smith resolving divisions within the party which had doomed him in 1971.

7th Legislative District
Party	Candidate	Votes	%
Democratic	Edward J. Hughes Jr. (incumbent)	26,863	57.88%
Republican	Walter L. Smith Jr.	19,317	41.62%
Socialist Labor	Bernardo S. Doganiero	231	0.50%
Total votes		46,411	

== District 8 ==
This district consisted of rural and suburban parts of Burlington County and eastern Mercer County, as well as Allentown, Roosevelt, and Upper Freehold Township in Monmouth County and Lakehurst and Manchester Township in Ocean County.

=== Republican primary ===
==== Results ====
Republican primary
Party	Candidate	Votes	%
Republican	Barry T. Parker (incumbent)	8,058	100.00%
Total votes		8,058	100.00%

=== Democratic primary ===
==== Results ====
Democratic primary
Party	Candidate	Votes	%
Democratic	Salvatore DiDonato	5,168	100.00%
Total votes		5,168	100.00%

=== General election ===
==== Candidates ====
- Salvatore DiDonato, Mercer County Community College administrator (Democratic)
- Barry T. Parker, incumbent Senator (Republican)

==== Campaign ====
DiDonato attacked Parker for his alleged support for special interest groups, particularly those involving workers' compensation issues. Parker, a member of the Senate Judiciary Committee, pledged "complete honesty and integrity in government."

==== Results ====
8th Legislative District
Party	Candidate	Votes	%
Republican	Barry T. Parker (incumbent)	23,422	52.82%
Democratic	Salvatoro L. DiDonato	20,923	47.18%
Total votes		44,345	100.00%

== District 9 ==
This district consisted of most of Ocean County, except for Little Egg Harbor, Tuckerton, and Manchester. It also took in Woodland Township in Burlington County and Millstone in Monmouth County. The largest towns in the district were Toms River and Lakewood.

=== Republican primary ===
==== Results ====
Republican primary
Party	Candidate	Votes	%
Republican	John F. Brown	14,896	100.00%
Total votes		14,896	100.00%

=== Democratic primary ===
==== Candidates ====
- Gaetano J. Alaimo, mayor of South Toms River
- Wesley K. Bell, mayor of Stafford Township
- Mark E. Egan, independent candidate for Freeholder in 1971
- John F. Russo, Ocean County Democratic Party chair and former Ocean County Prosecutor

==== Results ====
Democratic primary
Party	Candidate	Votes	%
Democratic	John F. Russo	4,259	61.00%
Democratic	Mark E. Egan	1,295	18.55%
Democratic	Wesley K. Bell	1,070	15.33%
Democratic	Gaetano J. Alaimo	358	5.13%
Total votes		6,982	100.00%

=== General election ===
==== Candidates ====
- Benjamin H. Mabie, Assemblyman from Pine Beach (Republican)
- John F. Russo, former Ocean County Prosecutor (Democratic)

==== Campaign ====
Tax reform was the overriding issue in the race. Mabie and his Republican running mates opposed an income tax and advocated using state lottery revenue and the $200 million budget surplus to fund public education. This plan was predicated on passage of federal legislation absorbing state welfare costs.

==== Results ====
9th Legislative District
Party	Candidate	Votes	%
Democratic	John F. Russo	38,388	54.53%
Republican	Benjamin H. Mabie	32,010	45.47%
Total votes		70,398	100.00%

== District 10 ==
This Monmouth County district consisted of Wall Township and a series of shore towns: Monmouth Beach, Long Branch, Deal, Allenhurst, Loch Arbour, Interlaken, Ocean Township, Asbury Park, Neptune, Neptune City, Bradley Beach, Avon, Belmar, South Belmar, Spring Lake, Spring Lake Heights, Sea Girt, Manasquan, Brielle, Point Pleasant, and Point Pleasant Beach.

=== Republican primary ===
==== Results ====
Republican primary
Party	Candidate	Votes	%
Republican	Richard R. Stout	10,248	100.00%
Total votes		10,248	100.00%

=== Democratic primary ===
Democratic primary
Party	Candidate	Votes	%
Democratic	Herbert J. Buehler	5,038	100.00%
Total votes		5,038	100.00%

=== General election ===
==== Candidates ====
- Herbert J. Buehler, Ocean Township teacher and former member of the Ocean Township Council (Democratic)
- Richard R. Stout, incumbent senator since 1952 and former president of the New Jersey Senate (Republican)

==== Campaign ====
Buehler focused his attacks on Stout's transportation record, charging that he failed to attract state and federal grants to solve the region's railroad issues. Stout maintained that he and other Republicans had attempted to do so, but were obstructed by the bankruptcy of the Penn Central Railroad. Stout also backed Republican gubernatorial nominee Charles W. Sandman's proposal for a mass transit agency, while Buehler backed his party's candidate, Brendan Byrne, by proposing that the Port Authority should assume responsibility for electrifying the New York and Long Branch Railroad.

The district was considered a Republican stronghold; Stout had been in office for 22 years. However, Buehler hoped to benefit from the popularity of Democratic gubernatorial candidate Brendan Byrne in the district.

==== Results ====
10th Legislative District
Party	Candidate	Votes	%
Democratic	Herbert J. Buehler	29,819	55.11%
Republican	Richard R. Stout (incumbent)	24,294	44.89%
Total votes		54,113	100.00%
Democratic gain from Republican		Swing	{{{swing}}}

== District 11 ==
This district was located entirely within Monmouth County. It included the municipalities of Atlantic Higlands, Colts Neck, Eatontown, Englishtown, Fair Haven, Farmingdale, Freehold, Freehold Township, Hazlet Township, Highlands, Holmdel, Howell Township, Little Silver, Manalapan Township, Marlboro Township, New Shrewsbury, Oceanport, Rumson, Sea Bright, Shrewsbury, Shrewsbury Township, and West Long Branch.

=== Republican primary ===
==== Results ====
Republican primary
Party	Candidate	Votes	%
Republican	Alfred N. Beadleston	6,845	100.00%
Total votes		6,845	100.00%

=== Democratic primary ===
Democratic primary
Party	Candidate	Votes	%
Democratic	Joseph Dietz	5,288	100.00%
Total votes		5,288	100.00%

=== General election ===
==== Candidates ====
- Alfred N. Beadleston, incumbent Senator and President of the New Jersey Senate (Republican)
- H. Joseph Dietz, Colts Neck businessman (Democratic)

==== Campaign ====
Beadleston took a low-profile approach to his campaign. Dietz, who ran an individual campaign separate from his Assembly running mates, challenged Beadleston to debates but was ignored or rejected. At one point, Dietz challenged Beadleston to a debate while Beadleston was serving as acting Governor.

Both candidates opposed a state income tax and supported cuts to welfare spending. They differed on how to reduce welfare spending, with Beadleston supporting a state takeover and Dietz supporting a federal takeover.

==== Results ====
11th Legislative District
Party	Candidate	Votes	%
Republican	Alfred N. Beadleston (incumbent)	27,718	54.05%
Democratic	H. Joseph Dietz	23,564	45.95%
Total votes		51,282	100.00%

== District 12 ==
This district was composed of the northern Monmouth County and southeastern Middlesex County. It included the Monmouth municipalities of Red Bank, Keansburg, Union Beach, Keyport, Matawan, Middletown Township and the Middlesex municipalities of Jamesburg, Madison Township (renamed Old Bridge in 1975), and Monroe Township.

Madison, Monroe, and Middletown were the largest and most politically significant municipalities.

=== Republican primary ===
==== Results ====
Republican primary
Party	Candidate	Votes	%
Republican	Joseph Azzolina (incumbent)	4,863	100.00%
Total votes		4,863	100.00%

=== Democratic primary ===
==== Candidates ====
- Eugene J. Bedell, incumbent Assemblyman

==== Results ====
Democratic primary
Party	Candidate	Votes	%
Democratic	Eugene J. Bedell	6,165	100.00%
Total votes		6,165	100.00%

=== General election ===
==== Candidates ====
- Joseph Azzolina, incumbent Senator (Republican)
- Eugene Bedell, Assemblyman and labor union manager (Democratic)
- Peter P. Garibaldi, Assemblyman and public accountant (Independent)

Peter P. Garibaldi, an incumbent Republican Assemblyman, entered the race after the Middlesex Republican Party denied him their nomination.

==== Campaign ====
This race featured three men who would serve in the Senate at some point: the incumbent Joseph Azzolina, the victor Eugene Bedell, and future Senator Peter P. Garibaldi. Though Garibaldi was a Republican, his campaign was expected to draw liberal Democratic voters away from Bedell.

One of the key issues in the campaign was the potential construction of a deepwater port. Azzolina was opposed to a port in the district; Bedell initially favored it before softening his stance. Bedell's Assembly running mates opposed a port until it could be deemed safe. Garibaldi received the highest score from the New Jersey Environmental Voters Alliance.

==== Results ====
12th Legislative District
Party	Candidate	Votes	%
Democratic	Eugene J. Bedell	29,193	58.80%
Republican	Joseph Azzolina (incumbent)	17,492	35.23%
United Ind.	Peter P. Garibaldi	2,967	5.98%
Total votes		49,652	100.00%
Democratic gain from Republican		Swing	{{{swing}}}

== District 13 ==
=== Republican primary ===
==== Results ====
Republican primary
Party	Candidate	Votes	%
Republican	Patrick J. Wilder	2,668	100.00%
Total votes		2,668	100.00%

=== Democratic primary ===
==== Candidates ====
- Joseph P. Merlino, incumbent Senator (District 6B)

==== Results ====
Democratic primary
Party	Candidate	Votes	%
Democratic	Joseph P. Merlino	7,988	100.00%
Total votes		7,988	100.00%

=== General election ===
13th Legislative District
Party	Candidate	Votes	%
Democratic	Joseph P. Merlino (incumbent)	34,826	74.45%
Republican	Patrick J. Wilder	11,953	25.55%
Total votes		46,779	100.00%

== District 14 ==
=== Republican primary ===
==== Candidates ====
- William Schluter, incumbent Senator (District 6A)

==== Results ====
Republican primary
Party	Candidate	Votes	%
Republican	William Schluter (incumbent)	9,350	100.00%
Total votes		9,350	100.00%

=== Democratic primary ===
==== Candidates ====
- Anne Clark Martindell, vice chair of the New Jersey Democratic State Committee

==== Results ====
Democratic primary
Party	Candidate	Votes	%
Democratic	Anne Clark Martindell	7,346	100.00%
Total votes		7,346	100.00%

=== General election ===
14th Legislative District
Party	Candidate	Votes	%
Democratic	Anne Clark Martindell	29,512	51.53%
Republican	William Schluter (incumbent)	27,755	48.47%
Total votes		57,267	100.00%

== District 15 ==
=== Republican primary ===
==== Candidates ====
- Wayne Dumont Jr., incumbent Senator since 1968 (District 15)

==== Results ====
Republican primary
Party	Candidate	Votes	%
Republican	Wayne Dumont Jr. (incumbent)	10,827	100.00%
Total votes		10,827	100.00%

=== Democratic primary ===
==== Candidates ====
- Martin F. Murphy, West Milford attorney

==== Results ====
Democratic primary
Party	Candidate	Votes	%
Democratic	Martin F. Murphy	5,883	100.00%
Total votes		5,883	100.00%

=== General election ===
15th Legislative District
Party	Candidate	Votes	%
Republican	Wayne Dumont Jr.	29,861	54.99%
Democratic	Martin F. Murphy	24,445	45.01%
Total votes		54,306	100.00%

== District 16 ==
=== Republican primary ===
==== Candidates ====
- Raymond Bateman, incumbent Senator since 1958 (District 8)

==== Results ====
Republican primary
Party	Candidate	Votes	%
Republican	Raymond Bateman (incumbent)	11,969	100.00%
Total votes		11,969	100.00%

=== Democratic primary ===
==== Candidates ====
- Herbert Koransky

==== Results ====
Democratic primary
Party	Candidate	Votes	%
Democratic	Herbert Koransky	3,927	100.00%
Total votes		3,927	100.00%

=== General election ===
16th Legislative District
Party	Candidate	Votes	%
Republican	Raymond Bateman (incumbent)	34,153	63.98%
Democratic	Herbert Koransky	19,230	36.02%
Total votes		53,383	100.00%

== District 17 ==
=== Republican primary ===
==== Candidates ====
- Robert K. Harlig Jr.

==== Results ====
Republican primary
Party	Candidate	Votes	%
Republican	Robert K. Harling Jr.	3,239	100.00%
Total votes		3,239	100.00%

=== Democratic primary ===
==== Candidates ====
- John Lynch, incumbent Senator since 1956 (District 7)

==== Results ====
Democratic primary
Party	Candidate	Votes	%
Democratic	John Lynch (incumbent)	6,133	100.00%
Total votes		6,133	100.00%

=== General election ===
17th Legislative District
Party	Candidate	Votes	%
Democratic	John Lynch (incumbent)	30,912	70.69%
Republican	Dominic R. Ciardi	12,434	28.44%
American	John Giammarco	381	0.87%
Total votes		43,727	100.00%

== District 18 ==
=== Republican primary ===
==== Candidates ====
- Fuller H. Brooks

==== Results ====
Republican primary
Party	Candidate	Votes	%
Republican	Fuller H. Brooks	4,149	100.00%
Total votes		4,149	100.00%

=== Democratic primary ===
==== Candidates ====
- Bernard J. Dwyer, Mayor of Edison

==== Results ====
Democratic primary
Party	Candidate	Votes	%
Democratic	Bernard J. Dwyer	9,470	100.00%
Total votes		9,470	100.00%

=== General election ===
18th Legislative District
Party	Candidate	Votes	%
Democratic	Bernard J. Dwyer	36,606	63.22%
Republican	Fuller H. Brooks	21,301	36.78%
Total votes		57,907	100.00%

== District 19 ==
=== Republican primary ===
==== Candidates ====
- Matthew E. Hawke

==== Results ====
Republican primary
Party	Candidate	Votes	%
Republican	Matthew E. Hawke	1,785	100.00%
Total votes		1,785	100.00%

=== Democratic primary ===
==== Candidates ====
- John J. Fay Jr., incumbent Assemblyman

==== Results ====
Democratic primary
Party	Candidate	Votes	%
Democratic	John J. Fay Jr.	8,509	100.00%
Total votes		8,509	100.00%

=== General election ===
19th Legislative District
Party	Candidate	Votes	%
Democratic	John J. Fay Jr.	38,496	78.55%
Republican	Matthew H. Hawke	10,511	21.45%
Total votes		49,007	100.00%

== District 20 ==
=== Republican primary ===
==== Candidates ====
- Francis X. McDermott, incumbent Senator (District 9)

==== Results ====
Republican primary
Party	Candidate	Votes	%
Republican	Francis X. McDermott (incumbent)	8,450	100.00%
Total votes		8,450	100.00%

=== Democratic primary ===
==== Candidates ====
- Alexander J. Menza, incumbent Assemblyman

==== Results ====
Democratic primary
Party	Candidate	Votes	%
Democratic	Alexander Menza	6,654	100.00%
Total votes		6,654	100.00%

=== General election ===
20th Legislative District
Party	Candidate	Votes	%
Democratic	Alexander J. Menza	34,040	56.33%
Republican	Francis X. McDermott (incumbent)	26,084	43.16%
Individualist	Oscar B. Johannsen	305	0.50%
Total votes		60,429	100.00%

== District 21 ==
=== Republican primary ===
==== Candidates ====
- William G. Palermo Jr.

==== Results ====
Republican primary
Party	Candidate	Votes	%
Republican	William G. Palermo Jr.	2,505	100.00%
Total votes		2,505	100.00%

=== Democratic primary ===
==== Candidates ====
- Thomas G. Dunn, incumbent Senator

==== Results ====
Democratic primary
Party	Candidate	Votes	%
Democratic	Thomas G. Dunn	9,478	100.00%
Total votes		9,478	100.00%

=== General election ===
21st Legislative District
Party	Candidate	Votes	%
Democratic	Thomas G. Dunn	26,138	62.72%
Republican	William G. Palermo Jr.	14,396	34.55%
Independent	Anthony Carbone	1,137	2.73%
Total votes		41,671	100.00%

== District 22 ==
=== Republican primary ===
==== Candidates ====
- Jerome Epstein, incumbent Senator (District 9)
- Peter McDonough, incumbent Assemblyman

==== Results ====
Republican primary
Party	Candidate	Votes	%
Republican	Peter McDonough	7,214	60.37%
Republican	Jerome Epstein (incumbent)	4,735	39.63%
Total votes		11,949	100.00%

=== Democratic primary ===
==== Candidates ====
- William Wright Jr.

==== Results ====
Democratic primary
Party	Candidate	Votes	%
Democratic	William Wright Jr.	5,962	100.00%
Total votes		5,962	100.00%

=== General election ===
22nd Legislative District
Party	Candidate	Votes	%
Republican	Peter J. McDonough	27,827	52.32%
Democratic	William Wright Jr.	25,361	47.68%
Total votes		53,188	100.00%

== District 23 ==
=== Republican primary ===
==== Candidates ====
- Josephine Margetts, incumbent Assemblywoman
- Joseph F. Warganz

==== Results ====
Republican primary
Party	Candidate	Votes	%
Republican	Josephine Margetts	9,702	60.37%
Republican	Joseph F. Warganz	3,062	39.63%
Total votes		12,764	100.00%

=== Democratic primary ===
==== Candidates ====
- Stephen B. Wiley, Morris Township attorney

==== Results ====
Democratic primary
Party	Candidate	Votes	%
Democratic	Stephen B. Wiley	6,910	100.00%
Total votes		6,910	100.00%

=== General election ===
23rd Legislative District
Party	Candidate	Votes	%
Democratic	Stephen B. Wiley	27,303	53.06%
Republican	Josephine Margetts	24,157	46.94%
Total votes		51,460	100.00%

== District 24 ==
=== Republican primary ===
==== Candidates ====
- Peter W. Thomas, incumbent Senator (District 10)

==== Results ====
Republican primary
Party	Candidate	Votes	%
Republican	Peter W. Thomas (incumbent)	10,550	100.00%
Total votes		10,550	100.00%

=== Democratic primary ===
==== Candidates ====
- John C. Keefe

==== Results ====
Democratic primary
Party	Candidate	Votes	%
Democratic	John C. Keefe	5,212	100.00%
Total votes		5,212	100.00%

=== General election ===
24th Legislative District
Party	Candidate	Votes	%
Republican	James P. Vreeland Jr.	26,004	52.62%
Democratic	John C. Keefe	23,417	47.38%
Total votes		49,421	100.00%

== District 25 ==
=== Republican primary ===
==== Candidates ====
- James Wallwork, incumbent Senator (District 11)

==== Results ====
Republican primary
Party	Candidate	Votes	%
Republican	James Wallwork (incumbent)	10,727	100.00%
Total votes		10,727	100.00%

=== Democratic primary ===
==== Candidates ====
- Donald S. Coburn
- Joel Wasserman

==== Results ====
Democratic primary
Party	Candidate	Votes	%
Democratic	Joel Wasserman	4,144	62.59%
Democratic	Donald S. Coburn	2,477	37.41%
Total votes		6,621	100.00%

=== General election ===
25th Legislative District
Party	Candidate	Votes	%
Republican	James Wallwork (incumbent)	30,552	54.24%
Democratic	Joel Wasserman	25,778	45.76%
Total votes		56,330	100.00%

== District 26 ==
=== Republican primary ===
==== Candidates ====
- Salvatore Beninanti

==== Results ====
Republican primary
Party	Candidate	Votes	%
Republican	Salvatore Beninanti	3,380	100.00%
Total votes		3,380	100.00%

=== Democratic primary ===
==== Candidates ====
- Frank J. Dodd, incumbent Senator (District 11)
- Joseph A. Lazaro

==== Results ====
Democratic primary
Party	Candidate	Votes	%
Democratic	Frank J. Dodd (incumbent)	14,513	83.63%
Democratic	Joseph A. Lazaro	2,841	16.37%
Total votes		17,354	100.00%

=== General election ===
26th Legislative District
Party	Candidate	Votes	%
Democratic	Frank J. Dodd (incumbent)	33,223	75.11%
Republican	Salvatore J. Beninati	11,012	24.89%
Total votes		44,235	100.00%

== District 27 ==
=== Republican primary ===
==== Candidates ====
- Michael A. Giuliano, incumbent Senator (District 11)

==== Results ====
Republican primary
Party	Candidate	Votes	%
Republican	Michael A. Giuliano	8,565	100.00%
Total votes		8,565	100.00%

=== Democratic primary ===
==== Candidates ====
- Carmen Orechio, mayor of Nutley

==== Results ====
Democratic primary
Party	Candidate	Votes	%
Democratic	Carmen Orechio	8,039	100.00%
Total votes		8,039	100.00%

=== General election ===
27th Legislative District
Party	Candidate	Votes	%
Democratic	Carmen Orechio	29,878	53.09%
Republican	Michael A. Giuliano	26,395	46.91%
Total votes		56,273	100.00%

== District 28 ==
=== Republican primary ===
==== Candidates ====
- Joseph Galluzzi

==== Results ====
Republican primary
Party	Candidate	Votes	%
Republican	Joseph Galluzzi	3,160	100.00%
Total votes		3,160	100.00%

=== Democratic primary ===
==== Candidates ====
- Martin L. Greenberg, attorney and candidate for Senator in 1971

===== Declined =====
- Ralph DeRose, incumbent Senator (District 11) (running for Governor)

==== Results ====
Democratic primary
Party	Candidate	Votes	%
Democratic	Martin L. Greenberg	7,432	100.00%
Total votes		7,432	100.00%

=== General election ===
28th Legislative District
Party	Candidate	Votes	%
Democratic	Martin L. Greenberg	22,290	60.31%
Republican	Joseph P. Galluzzi	13,601	36.80%
American	Chris Marciano	1,070	2.89%
Total votes		36,961	100.00%

== District 29 ==
=== Republican primary ===
==== Candidates ====
- Lillie Simpson

==== Results ====
Republican primary
Party	Candidate	Votes	%
Republican	Lillie Simpson	613	100.00%
Total votes		613	100.00%

=== Democratic primary ===
==== Candidates ====
- Wynona Lipman, incumbent Senator (District 11)

==== Results ====
Democratic primary
Party	Candidate	Votes	%
Democratic	Wynona Lipman (incumbent)	7,360	100.00%
Total votes		7,360	100.00%

=== General election ===
29th Legislative District
Party	Candidate	Votes	%
Democratic	Wynona Lipman (incumbent)	16,071	83.84%
Republican	Lillie Simpson	3,098	16.16%
Total votes		19,169	100.00%

== District 30 ==
=== Republican primary ===
==== Candidates ====
- C. Richard Fiore, incumbent Assemblyman from Newark

==== Results ====
Republican primary
Party	Candidate	Votes	%
Republican	C. Richard Fiore	2,641	100.00%
Total votes		2,641	100.00%

=== Democratic primary ===
==== Candidates ====
- Gregory J. Castano, Newark Star-Ledger sportswriter
- Mary V. Senatore, Belleville Commissioner

==== Campaign ====
The campaign pitted the Hudson County Democratic Organization, which supported Castano, against the Essex County Organization, which supported Senatore.

==== Results ====
Democratic primary
Party	Candidate	Votes	%
Democratic	Gregory J. Castano	9,231	54.01%
Democratic	Mary V. Senatore	7,859	45.99%
Total votes		17,090	100.00%

=== General election ===
30th Legislative District
Party	Candidate	Votes	%
For The People	Anthony Imperiale	24,756	49.34%
Democratic	Gregory J. Castano	18,286	36.45%
Republican	C. Richard Fiore	7,131	14.21%
Total votes		50,173	

== District 31 ==
=== Republican primary ===
==== Candidates ====
- Franco Di Domenica
- Henry W. Kolakowski

==== Results ====
Republican primary
Party	Candidate	Votes	%
Republican	Henry W. Kolakowski	1,304	86.19%
Republican	Franco Di Domenica	209	13.81%
Total votes		1,513	100.00%

=== Democratic primary ===
==== Candidates ====
- James P. Dugan, incumbent Senator (District 12)

==== Results ====
Democratic primary
Party	Candidate	Votes	%
Democratic	James P. Dugan (incumbent)	14,659	100.00%
Total votes		14,659	100.00%

=== General election ===
31st Legislative District
Party	Candidate	Votes	%
Democratic	James P. Dugan (incumbent)	36,921	79.46%
Republican	Henry W. Kolakowski	9,543	20.54%
Total votes		46,464	100.00%

== District 32 ==
=== Republican primary ===
==== Candidates ====
- John P. Errico

==== Results ====
Republican primary
Party	Candidate	Votes	%
Republican	John P. Errico	1,876	100.00%
Total votes		1,876	100.00%

=== Democratic primary ===
==== Candidates ====
- Michael J. Bell
- Joseph W. Tumulty, Jersey City attorney

===== Declined =====
- William F. Kelly Jr., incumbent Senator (District 12) since 1958

==== Results ====
Democratic primary
Party	Candidate	Votes	%
Democratic	Joseph W. Tumulty	16,691	67.09%
Democratic	Michael J. Bell	8,187	32.91%
Total votes		24,878	100.00%

=== General election ===
32nd Legislative District
Party	Candidate	Votes	%
Democratic	Joseph W. Tumulty	35,770	74.72%
Republican	John P. Errico	10,955	22.88%
Abolish County Govt.	Robert Habermann	1,146	2.39%
Total votes		47,871	100.00%

== District 33 ==
=== Republican primary ===
==== Candidates ====
- Thomas McSherry

==== Results ====
Republican primary
Party	Candidate	Votes	%
Republican	Thomas McSherry	1,823	100.00%
Total votes		1,823	100.00%

=== Democratic primary ===
==== Candidates ====
- Harry J. Leber
- William V. Musto, incumbent Senator (District 12)

==== Results ====
Democratic primary
Party	Candidate	Votes	%
Democratic	William V. Musto (incumbent)	16,156	66.46%
Democratic	Harry J. Leber	8,152	33.54%
Total votes		24,308	100.00%

=== General election ===
33rd Legislative District
Party	Candidate	Votes	%
Democratic	William V. Musto	30,176	78.04%
Republican	Thomas McSherry	8,492	21.96%
Total votes		38,668	100.00%

== District 34 ==
=== Republican primary ===
==== Candidates ====
- Louise Friedman

==== Results ====
Republican primary
Party	Candidate	Votes	%
Republican	Louise Friedman	5,605	100.00%
Total votes		5,605	100.00%

=== Democratic primary ===
==== Candidates ====
- Joseph Hirkala, incumbent Senator (District 14)

===== Declined =====
- William J. Bate, incumbent Senator (District 14) (ran for Assembly)

==== Results ====
Democratic primary
Party	Candidate	Votes	%
Democratic	Joseph Hirkala (incumbent)	5,605	100.00%
Total votes		5,605	100.00%

=== General election ===
34th Legislative District
Party	Candidate	Votes	%
Democratic	Joseph Hirkala	33,047	63.88%
Republican	Louise Friedman	18,682	36.12%
Total votes		51,729	100.00%

== District 35 ==
=== Democratic primary ===
==== Candidates ====
- Dominic Cuccinello
- Michael U. DeVita, former mayor of Paterson (1948–51)
- Joseph A. Lazzara, incumbent Senator (District 14)
- Roy Leon Ward

==== Results ====
Democratic primary
Party	Candidate	Votes	%
Democratic	Joseph A. Lazzara (incumbent)	4,211	56.39%
Democratic	Michael U. DeVita	2,643	35.39%
Democratic	Dominic Cuccinello	358	4.79%
Democratic	Roy Leon Ward	256	3.43%
Total votes		7,468	100.00%

=== Republican primary ===
==== Candidates ====
- Frank Davenport, Passaic County Sheriff

==== Results ====
Republican primary
Party	Candidate	Votes	%
Republican	Frank Davenport	3,272	100.00%
Total votes		3,272	100.00%

=== General election ===
35th Legislative District
Party	Candidate	Votes	%
Republican	Frank Davenport	16,919	50.14%
Democratic	Joseph A. Lazzara (incumbent)	16,826	49.86%
Total votes		33,745	100.00%

== District 36 ==
=== Republican primary ===
==== Candidates ====
- Harold A. Pareti

===== Declined =====
- Harold Hollenbeck

==== Results ====
Republican primary
Party	Candidate	Votes	%
Republican	Anthony Scardino Jr.	6,279	100.00%
Total votes		6,279	100.00%

=== Democratic primary ===
==== Candidates ====
- Anthony Scardino, mayor of Lyndhurst

==== Results ====
Democratic primary
Party	Candidate	Votes	%
Democratic	Anthony Scardino	5,695	100.00%
Total votes		5,695	100.00%

=== General election ===
36th Legislative District
Party	Candidate	Votes	%
Democratic	Anthony Scardino	35,953	62.01%
Republican	Harold A. Pareti	21,332	36.79%
Socialist Labor	Kenneth Kowalczyk	698	1.20%
Total votes		57,983	100.00%

== District 37 ==
=== Republican primary ===
==== Candidates ====
- Joseph Woodcock, incumbent Senator (District 13)

==== Results ====
Republican primary
Party	Candidate	Votes	%
Republican	Joseph Woodcock (incumbent)	6,572	100.00%
Total votes		6,572	100.00%

=== Democratic primary ===
==== Candidates ====
- Matthew Feldman, Bergen County Democratic chairman and former Senator

==== Results ====
Democratic primary
Party	Candidate	Votes	%
Democratic	Matthew Feldman	9,320	100.00%
Total votes		9,320	100.00%

=== General election ===
37th Legislative District
Party	Candidate	Votes	%
Democratic	Matthew Feldman	36,690	58.62%
Republican	Joseph Woodcock (incumbent)	25,524	40.78%
Socialist Labor	Armand Milletari	373	0.60%
Total votes		62,587	100.00%

== District 38 ==
=== Republican primary ===
==== Candidates ====
- Frederick E. Wendel, incumbent Senator (District 13)

==== Results ====
Republican primary
Party	Candidate	Votes	%
Republican	Frederick Wendel (incumbent)	6,554	100.00%
Total votes		6,554	100.00%

=== Democratic primary ===
==== Candidates ====
- John Skevin, former Assemblyman (1966–68)
- Joseph Ventricelli

==== Results ====
Democratic primary
Party	Candidate	Votes	%
Democratic	John Skevin	4,808	81.07%
Democratic	Joseph Ventricelli	1,123	18.93%
Total votes		5,931	100.00%

=== General election ===
38th Legislative District
Party	Candidate	Votes	%
Democratic	John M. Skevin	31,677	57.61%
Republican	Frederick E. Wendel	23,307	42.39%
Total votes		54,984	100.00%

== District 39 ==
=== Republican primary ===
==== Candidates ====
- Harry Randall Jr.

==== Results ====
Republican primary
Party	Candidate	Votes	%
Republican	Harry Randall Jr.	6,474	100.00%
Total votes		6,474	100.00%

=== Democratic primary ===
==== Candidates ====
- Raymond Garramone, mayor of Haworth

==== Results ====
Democratic primary
Party	Candidate	Votes	%
Democratic	Raymond Garramone	4,937	100.00%
Total votes		4,937	100.00%

=== General election ===
39th Legislative District
Party	Candidate	Votes	%
Democratic	Raymond Garramone	31,999	54.29%
Republican	Harry Randall Jr.	26,942	45.71%
Total votes		58,941	100.00%

== District 40 ==
=== Republican primary ===
==== Candidates ====
- Garrett W. Hagedorn, incumbent Senator (District 13)

==== Results ====
Republican primary
Party	Candidate	Votes	%
Republican	Garrett W. Hagedorn (incumbent)	9,324	100.00%
Total votes		9,324	100.00%

=== Democratic primary ===
==== Candidates ====
- Paul Z. Lewis

==== Results ====
Democratic primary
Party	Candidate	Votes	%
Democratic	Paul Z. Lewis	6,811	100.00%
Total votes		6,811	100.00%

=== General election ===
40th Legislative District
Party	Candidate	Votes	%
Republican	Garrett W. Hagedorn	32,566	56.19%
Democratic	Robert A. Pennachio	25,394	43.81%
Total votes		57,960	100.00%
