= Joseph Danielsen =

American politician

Member of the New Jersey General Assembly from the 17th district
- Incumbent
- Assumed office October 16, 2014 Serving with Kevin Egan
- Preceded by: Upendra J. Chivukula

Chair of the New Jersey General Assembly Committee on Oversight, Reform and Federal Relations
- Incumbent
- Assumed office January 9, 2018

Personal details
- Party: Democratic Party
- Spouse: Christine Danielsen
- Website: Legislative Website

Joseph Danielsen is an American Democratic Party politician, who represents the 17th Legislative District in the New Jersey General Assembly, where he has served since October 16, 2014, after being appointed to fill the vacant seat of Upendra J. Chivukula, who left office to take a seat as a Commissioner on the New Jersey Board of Public Utilities.

Danielsen has served in the General Assembly as Deputy Whip since 2020.

== Early life ==
A lifelong resident of Franklin Township, Danielsen is an IT consultant and owner of Network Blade LLC. He is a veteran of the United States Army Reserve, having served in the 78th Div. Reserve TNG from 1982 to 1991, as well as a volunteer fire fighter for 22 years. He was as a member of the Franklin Township Fire District No. 1 Board of Fire Commissioners from 2000 to 2006. During his term he was integral in creating an inter-local agreement between the township and the four fire districts that provided fire fighters during the day. From 1997 until 2010, Danielsen served on the Franklin Township Planning Board, including a stint as vice chair for several of those years. In that role, he supported economic development and helped attract businesses to Franklin Township while maintaining the local historic character. He is the head of the Franklin Township Municipal Democratic Committee. Danielsen received an A.S. in Marketing, Art, and Design from Middlesex County College and a B.A. in Visual Arts from Rutgers University. The youngest of nine children, he remains a resident of Franklin Township with his wife Christine and their three children.

== New Jersey Assembly ==
Danielsen was appointed to fill the vacant seat of Upendra J. Chivukula, who left office to take a seat as a Commissioner on the New Jersey Board of Public Utilities, and took office on October 16, 2014.

=== Committee assignments ===
Committee assignments for the 2022—23 Legislative Session are:

- Oversight, Reform and Federal Relations, Chair
- Agriculture and Food Security
- Financial Institutions and Insurance

=== District 17 ===
Each of the 40 districts in the New Jersey Legislature has one representative in the New Jersey Senate and two members in the New Jersey General Assembly. The representatives from the 17th District for the 2024—2025 Legislative Session are:

- Senator Bob Smith (D)
- Assemblyman Joseph Danielsen (D)
- Assemblyman Kevin Egan (D)

== Electoral history ==
=== New Jersey Assembly ===
17th Legislative District General Election, 2023
Party	Candidate	Votes	%
Democratic	Kevin Egan	20,159	36.3
Democratic	Joseph Danielsen (incumbent)	20,064	36.2
Republican	Susan Hucko	7,771	14.0
Republican	Dhimant G. Patel	7,473	13.5
Total votes		55,467	100.0
Democratic hold			
Democratic hold			

17th legislative district general election, 2021
Party	Candidate	Votes	%
Democratic	Joseph V. Egan (incumbent)	32,212	34.83%
Democratic	Joseph Danielsen (incumbent)	31,625	34.19%
Republican	Catherine Barrier	14,482	15.66%
Republican	Peter W. Gabra	14,173	15.32%
Total votes		92,492	100.0
Democratic hold			

17th Legislative District General Election, 2019
Party	Candidate	Votes	%
Democratic	Joseph Egan (incumbent)	20,272	36.47%
Democratic	Joseph Danielsen (incumbent)	20,108	36.18%
Republican	Patricia Badovinac	7,612	13.69%
Republican	Maria Conception Powell	7,592	13.66%
Total votes		55,584	100%
Democratic hold			

New Jersey general election, 2017
Party	Candidate	Votes	%	±%
Democratic	Joseph V. Egan	29,149	36.0	▲2.1
Democratic	Joe Danielsen	28,425	35.1	▲1.2
Republican	Robert A. Quinn	11,317	14.0	▼2.0
Republican	Nadine Wilkins	11,131	13.8	▲0.1
It’s Our Time	Michael Habib	875	1.1	N/A
Total votes		'80,897'	'100.0'	

New Jersey general election, 2015
Party	Candidate	Votes	%	±%
Democratic	Joseph V. Egan	13,444	33.9	▲1.4
Democratic	Joseph F. Danielsen	13,426	33.9	▲2.0
Republican	Robert Mettler	6,362	16.0	▼2.8
Republican	Brajesh Singh	5,430	13.7	▼3.1
Green	Molly O’Brien	985	2.5	N/A
Total votes		'39,647'	'100.0'	

New Jersey General Assembly
Preceded by Upendra J. Chivukula	Member of the New Jersey General Assembly for the 17th District; October 16, 2014 – Present; With: Joseph V. Egan	Succeeded by Incumbent
