= New Jersey Division of the Rate Counsel =

State agency of New Jersey, United States

Government agency overview
- Preceding Government agency: New Jersey Division of the Ratepayer Advocate
- Jurisdiction: New Jersey
- Government agency executive: Brian O. Lipman, Division Director

The New Jersey Division of the Rate Counsel (previously called the New Jersey Division of the Ratepayer Advocate) is a government agency in the U.S. state of New Jersey that is responsible for representing the interests of residents, businesses and other rate payers in dealing with regulated public utilities and insurance firms. Brian O. Lipman has served as Division Director since November 8, 2021.

The Rate Counsel is tasked to see that consumers receive appropriate service and value, and is charged with "ensuring adequate representation of the interest of those consumers whose interest would otherwise be inadequately represented" in dealing with regulatory agencies. For utility fees and rates set by the New Jersey Board of Public Utilities (BPU), the Rate Counsel evaluates the requests made by the utility and acts on behalf of customers to see that their interests are represented, through actions that may include negotiations with the utility, hearings at the BPU and litigation in state or federal court.
