= Angela L. Perun =

American politician

Member of the New Jersey General Assembly from the 17th district
- In office January 12, 1982 – January 14, 1986 Serving with David C. Schwartz
- Preceded by: Joseph D. Patero
- Succeeded by: Bob Smith

Personal details
- Born: March 14, 1921 New York City, New York
- Died: November 17, 2007 (aged 86) Plainfield, New Jersey
- Party: Democratic (before 1985); Republican (after 1985)

Angela L. Perun (March 14, 1921 – November 17, 2007) was an American politician who served in the New Jersey General Assembly from the 17th Legislative District from 1982 to 1986.
