= 1993 New Jersey gubernatorial election =

- November 2, 1993
- Turnout: 65% (▲5pp)
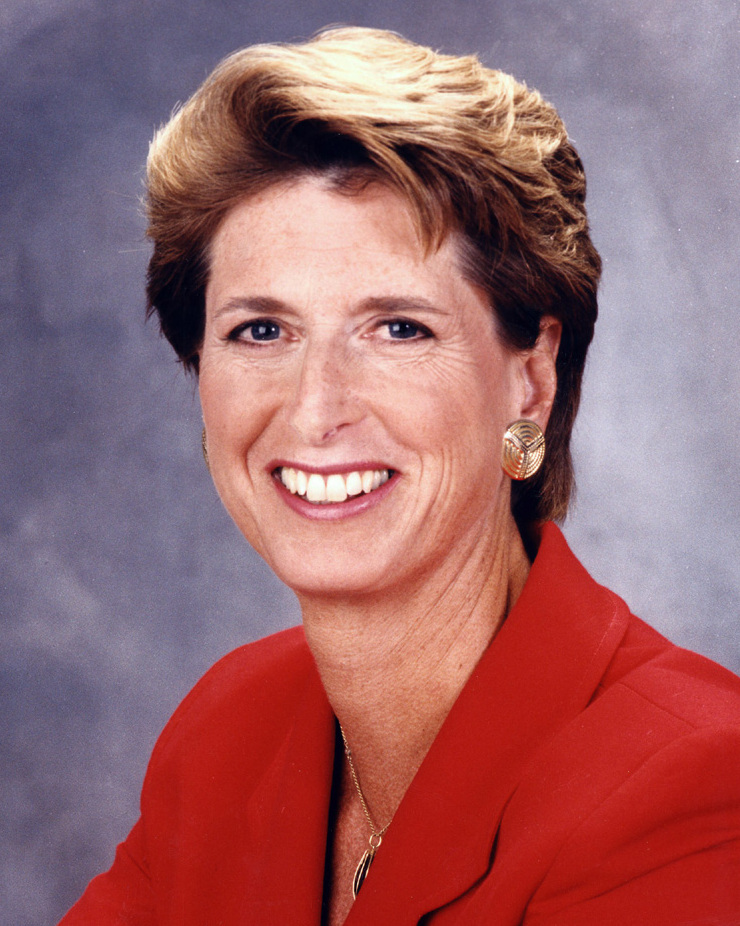

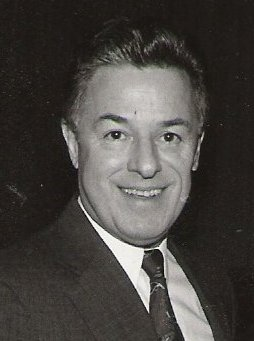
Nominee	Christine Todd Whitman	James Florio
Party	Republican	Democratic
Popular vote	1,236,124	1,210,031
Percentage	49.33%	48.29%
- Whitman: 40–50% 50–60% 60–70% Florio: 40–50% 50–60% 60–70%
Governor before election
James Florio
Democratic
Elected Governor
Christine Todd Whitman
Republican

The 1993 New Jersey gubernatorial election was held on November 2, 1993. Incumbent Democratic governor James Florio was narrowly defeated by Republican former Somerset County freeholder and 1990 U.S. Senate nominee Christine Todd Whitman. Florio's defeat followed backlash from voters against his administration's tax increases. Upon winning the election, Whitman became the first woman to serve as governor of New Jersey.

Primary elections were held on June 8, 1993. In the Democratic primary, Governor Florio's only challenger, anti-tax activist John Budzash, was disqualified from the ballot due to invalid petition signatures. In the Republican primary, Whitman defeated former state attorney general W. Cary Edwards and former state senator James Wallwork.

== Background ==
In the 1989 election, Jim Florio—then a U.S. representative—defeated Republican U.S. representative Jim Courter by a wide margin. Florio had previously run unsuccessful campaigns for governor in 1977 and 1981. During the 1989 campaign, Florio said, "You can write this statement down: 'Florio feels there is no need for new taxes'".

However, the centerpiece Florio administration's 1990 legislative agenda was a $2.8 billion increase in tax revenue, which one consultant identified "the largest single tax increase in the history of the finances of the 50 states" and "a national test case on both political and economic grounds." The tax increase was highly unpopular, leading to non-partisan, grassroots protests throughout New Jersey. The Florio administration adopted a cautious approach, hoping that protests would desist once the legislative package delivered benefits in the form of rebate checks, lower auto insurance rates, and increased funding for education. Two other major legislative achievements were a gun control measure targeting "assault-style weapons" and the Quality Education Act, which set new standards for public schools and set strict spending caps on local school boards.

By fall of 1990, Florio's approval rating sank to 18 percent, and it would not exceed the low 20s until 1992. The electoral impact of the anti-Florio tax revolt manifested in November 1990, when incumbent United States senator Bill Bradley was nearly unseated by political unknown Christine Todd Whitman. During her campaign, Whitman had repeatedly asked Bradley for his position on the tax increases, but he demurred, calling the policy a "state issue." Whitman's near-victory endeared her to the Republican voter base and made her a symbol of opposition to the tax increase and to Florio.

Entering 1991, Republicans centered their legislative campaigns on repealing the tax increase, as did some incumbent Democrats, such as state senator Paul Contillo. Florio faced backlash from the NRA Political Victory Fund, which spent nearly $250,000 targeting candidates in both parties who had voted in favor of the gun control measure and supporting those who pledged to repeal it, and from the New Jersey Education Association, which had supported Florio in 1989 but primarily supported Republicans in 1991 in response to the education spending caps. The result was a resounding Republican landslide in the 1991 elections. The Republican Party gained ten seats in the New Jersey Senate (controlling the chamber for the first time since 1974) and 21 seats in the General Assembly. Both chambers had veto-proof Republican majorities, which drew some political pressure off of Florio for the remainder of his term. In the latter half of his term, Florio's approval ratings began to rebound as the Republican legislature was given a share of the blame for dysfunction in Trenton.

== Democratic primary ==
=== Candidates ===
- Jim Florio, incumbent governor since 1990

==== Disqualified ====
- John Budzash, anti-tax protestor

Florio was unopposed in the June primary election. John Budzash, a retired Howell Township postal worker and the leader of Hands Across New Jersey, a citizens group that protested the state tax increases, switched his registration from the Republican Party to the Democratic Party one day before the filing deadline and registered to run against Florio. However, he was removed from the ballot following a complaint from state Democratic Party chair Raymond Lesniak, alleging that many of Budzash's petition signatures were invalid.

=== Campaign finance ===
Primary campaign finance activity
Candidate	Spent
Jim Florio	$2,903,098
Source: New Jersey Election Law Enforcement Commission

=== Results ===
Democratic primary results
Party	Candidate	Votes	%
Democratic	James Florio (incumbent)	200,420	100.00
Total votes		200,420	100.00

== Republican primary ==
=== Background ===
In 1989, Jim Courter won the Republican primary for governor with a plurality of the voter. His nearest opponent, former state attorney general W. Cary Edwards, was seen as the natural favorite for the 1993 nomination. Edwards was a key member of the popular Thomas Kean administration as general counsel and then as attorney general. However, Edwards's path to the nomination became complicated by Christine Todd Whitman's 1990 campaign for United States Senate. Her underdog two-point loss endeared her to the party base and made her the leading public advocate of the anti-tax cause.

In 1991, Whitman continued to build her profile by founding a political action committee, the Committee for an Affordable New Jersey, through which she campaigned for Republican candidates in the midterm elections. During the campaign, Whitman distanced herself from veteran consultant Roger Stone after he facilitated a primary challenge to state senator Bill Gormley, a potential 1993 opponent. Whitman took on a full campaign speaking schedule through October 1992.

=== Candidates ===
- W. Cary Edwards, former New Jersey Attorney General and assemblyman from Oakland and candidate for governor in 1989
- J. Patrick Gilligan, American Stock Exchange consultant and former Morris Township board of education member
- James Wallwork, former state senator from Short Hills and candidate for governor in 1981
- Christine Todd Whitman, former Somerset County freeholder and Board of Public Utilities president and nominee for the United States Senate in 1990

==== Withdrew ====
- Charles P. Hoffman, business consultant (withdrew May 6, endorsed Wallwork)

==== Declined ====
- William Gormley, state senator from Mays Landing and candidate for governor in 1989
- Thomas Kean, former governor of New Jersey (1982–90)

=== Campaign ===
The primary campaign was marked by negative exchanges between the three strongest candidates and Whitman's clear status as the front-runner throughout.

==== Illegal alien hiring controversy ====
The campaign began as a two-candidate race between Christine Whitman and Cary Edwards. Polling suggested that either would beat Governor Florio but that Whitman was generally the stronger of the two. In February, responding to national controversy over nominee for U.S. Attorney General Zoë Baird's hiring of illegal aliens in violation of federal law, both candidates voluntarily disclosed that they had done so too and failed to required taxes or fines. The revelation dramatically weakened both campaigns; seventy percent of voters said the admission was very or somewhat serious.

Soon after, former state senator James Wallwork declared his candidacy as a conservative alternative to Whitman and Edwards, tapping into populist unrest. Like H. Ross Perot and Jerry Brown had during the 1992 presidential campaign, Wallwork offered voters a toll-free number they could call to directly propose positions. Wallwork, who had last cut a political figure in a 1981 campaign for governor, said his campaign would be about "people taking back their government."

In the final weeks of the campaign, Whitman ran advertisements presenting herself as a candidate for change but not mentioning her opponents or Governor Florio by name. Edwards attacked both Whitman in Florio in his advertisements, while Wallwork focused on painting Whitman as "liberal" and ran an ad stating that she had voted to raise taxes 17 times as Somerset Freeholder. In the final week of the campaign, Whitman began running negative advertisements as well.

A large portion of the campaign was focused on winning over the 522,000 New Jerseyans who had voted for H. Ross Perot in the 1992 presidential campaign. Perot remained popular in the state; on the final weekend of the campaign, he hosted a get-out-the-vote rally which all three candidates attended.

==== Debates ====
The three major candidates participated in at least six debates and two mandatory televised debates.

By May 11, Whitman was the heavy favorite entering the first televised debate in Whippany; her campaign claimed no less than a double-digit lead over both opponents. At the debate, all three candidates agreed in their opposition to the Florio tax increase but disagreed over how to repeal it. Edwards called for a new popularly elected office of Auditor to evaluate potential budget cuts, while Wallwork and Whitman argued that the powerful line-item veto allowed the governor to do so immediately. Whitman also attacked Edwards for a nine percent increase in crime during his tenure as attorney general, a preemptive rebuttal to Edwards's accusation that she was soft on crime.

The second televised debate on May 26 was focused on business issues and was less contentious; the candidates mostly agreed on automobile insurance reform, managed health care, unemployment, pollution legislation and sports betting. At one point, during an exchange on unemployment, Edwards accused Whitman of not understanding the plight of the unemployed, saying "At least I have had a job in my life." Whitman demanded an apology for this and an earlier comment in which Edwards, during a two-person debate with Wallwork, said he "resented" running against a woman. Edwards declined to apologize and later accused Whitman of "setting him up." Another disagreement came over private school vouchers; Whitman supported them while Edwards was opposed and Wallwork deferred to a public referendum.

Two non-televised debates were hosted by Perot supporters under the banner of "United We Stand." All three candidates attended the first but only Edwards and Wallwork attended the second.

=== Endorsements ===
List of Christine Todd Whitman endorsements

Local officials

- Jack Ciattarelli, president of the Raritan borough council

Individuals

- Howard Stern, radio host

Organizations

- Hands Across New Jersey, anti-tax organization
Declined to endorse

Governors

- Thomas Kean, former governor of New Jersey

=== Polling ===
Poll source	Date(s) administered	Sample size	Margin of error	W. Cary Edwards	Christine Todd Whitman	James Wallwork	Other/Undecided
The Record	March 9–19, 1993	227 LV	±6.5%	8%	28%	2%	62%
Asbury Park Press/Courier-Post	April 2–4, 1993	630 A	±3.9%	14%	30%	4%	52%
The Record	April 25–May 3, 1993	208 LV	±7.0%	14%	41%	5%	37%
KYW-TV	May 28–June 1, 1993	245 LV	±6.7%	23%	37%	18%	22%

=== Campaign finance ===
Primary campaign finance activity
Candidate	Spent
Christie Whitman	$2,953,797
Cary Edwards	$2,844,132
James Wallwork	$1,266,429
Source: New Jersey Election Law Enforcement Commission

=== Results ===
Republican primary results by county Todd Whitman: 30–40%; 40–50%; 50–60%; Edwards: 30–40%; 40–50%; Wallwork: 30–40%

Republican Party primary results
Party	Candidate	Votes	%
Republican	Christine Todd Whitman	159,765	39.96%
Republican	W. Cary Edwards	131,578	32.91%
Republican	James Wallwork	96,034	24.02%
Republican	Charles P. Hoffman (withdrawn)	6,695	1.67%
Republican	J. Patrick Gilligan	5,753	1.44%
Total votes		399,825	100.00

== General election ==
=== Candidates ===
- Alene S. Ammond, public-relations executive and former state senator (Hands-On Government)
- Marilyn Arons, public advocate for disabled children (Maximum Citizen Involvement)
- Tom Blomquist, head of the New Jersey Conservative Party (Conservative)
- Pat Daly, (Abortion is Murder)
- Pete DiLauro, retired New York City Police Department officer (Common Sense Government)
- Tim Feeney, dentist (Independent Choice)
- James Florio, incumbent governor of New Jersey (Democratic)
- Tom Fuscaldo, former factory maintenance worker (Zero Sales Tax)
- Jerry T. Grant, car salesman (You and I)
- Kenneth R. Kaplan, industrial/commercial real estate broker (Libertarian)
- John L. Kucek, certified public accountant (Populist)
- Andrea Lippi, poet (People Purpose Progress)
- Richary J. Lynch, Camden businessman (Independents 4 Change)
- Joseph Marion, trade association manager (independent)
- Mark J. Rahn, warehouse worker (Socialist Workers)
- Michael R. Scully, attorney (Fresh Start)
- Christine Todd Whitman, former Somerset County Freeholder and Board of Public Utilities president (Republican)
- Andrew J. Zemel, quality control consultant (Integrity-Common Sense)
- Michael "Mike" Ziruolo, trucking consultant (Better Affordable Government)

=== Campaign ===
Florio had become unpopular due to his 1990 $2.8-billion tax increase. As a result of the tax increase, Republicans were swept into both houses of the Legislature in 1991. A 1990 bill that was signed into law banning assault weapons was used against Florio in advertisements by the National Rifle Association of America. A proposal by Whitman to cut income taxes by 30% over three years was met with skepticism from voters.

=== Polling ===
Polling for the election mostly showed that Florio would be reelected. Polls conducted within a few weeks of the election by The Star-Ledger, The New York Times, the Record of Hackensack, and Rutgers-Eagleton showed Florio besting Whitman by at least eight points. The final poll released before the election, however was conducted by the Asbury Park Press and showed a 38–38 tie with 22% undecided, and undecided and independent voters tended towards Whitman at the time of the election.

Poll source	Date(s) administered	Sample size	Margin of error	Jim Florio (D)	Christine Todd Whitman (R)	Undecided
The Record	August 26–29, 1991	526 LV	±4.5%	27%	52%	21%
Asbury Park Press	January 1993	672 A	±4.4%	30%	36%	34%
The Record	March 9–19, 1993	610 LV	±4.0%	39%	30%	31%
Asbury Park Press	April 2–4, 1993	630 A	±3.9%	36%	45%	19%
The Record	April 25–May 3, 1993	802 LV	±3.5%	38%	34%	28%
KYW-TV	May 28–June 1, 1993	811 RV	±3.5%	37%	43%	20%
Rutgers-Eagleton	June 10–16, 1993	642 RV	±3.5%	48%	43%	9%
The Record	June 27–July 1, 1993	889 LV	±3.5%	39%	38%	23%
Asbury Park Press/	August 12–14, 1993	683 LV	±3.8%	37%	38%	25%
The Record	September 7–12, 1993	606 LV	±4.5%	43%	43%	14%
Asbury Park Press	September 9–12, 1993	652 LV	±3.8%	42%	36%	22%
Rutgers-Eagleton	September 10–15, 1993	584 LV	±4.0%	47%	38%	15%
The New York Times/WCBS-TV	September 20–26, 1993	804 RV	±4.0%	51%	30%	19%
Asbury Park Press	Sep. 30–Oct. 2, 1993	545 LV	±4.3%	47%	34%	19%
The Record	Sep. 30–Oct. 3, 1993	754 RV	±4.0%	50%	37%	13%
The New York Times/WCBS-TV	October 9–11, 1993	925 RV	±3.0%	49%	34%	17%
g-Eagleton	October 11–14, 1993	577 LV	±4.0%	52%	40%	8%
Asbury Park Press	October 21–23, 1993	810 RV	±3.8%	45%	40%	15%
The Record	October 24–27, 1993	703 LV	±4.0%	51%	41%	8%
Rutgers-Eagleton	October 27–29, 1993	601 LV	±3.5%	48%	39%	13%
Asbury Park Press	October 28–30, 1993	1,072 RV	±3.0%	38%	38%	22%

Hypothetical polling

with Edwards

Poll source	Date(s) administered	Sample size	Margin of error	Jim Florio (D)	W. Cary Edwards (R)	Undecided
Asbury Park Press/Courier-Post	January 1993	672 A	±4.4%	31%	32%	37%
The Record	March 9–19, 1993	610 LV	±4.0%	40%	25%	35%
Asbury Park Press	April 2–4, 1993	630 A	±3.9%	31%	40%	29%
KYW-TV	May 28–June 1, 1993	811 RV	±3.5%	34%	38%	28%

with Wallwork

Poll source	Date(s) administered	Sample size	Margin of error	Jim Florio (D)	James Wallwork (R)	Undecided
Asbury Park Press	April 2–4, 1993	630 A	±3.9%	33%	36%	31%
KYW-TV	May 28–June 1, 1993	811 RV	±3.5%	35%	37%	28%

=== Campaign finance ===
General election campaign finance activity
Candidate	Spent
Christie Whitman	$6,571,005
Jim Florio	$6,330,056
Source: New Jersey Election Law Enforcement Commission

=== Results ===
As of 2026, this is the last that Cape May County voted Democratic in a gubernatorial election.

1993 New Jersey gubernatorial election
Party	Candidate	Votes	%	±%
Republican	Christine Todd Whitman	1,236,124	49.33%	▲12.12
Democratic	James Florio (incumbent)	1,210,031	48.29%	▼12.94
Independent	Pat Daly	10,071	0.40%	N/A
Libertarian	Kenneth R. Kaplan	7,935	0.32%	▼0.26
Conservative	Tom Blomquist	5,164	0.21%	N/A
Independent	Joseph Marion	4,311	0.17%	N/A
Independent	Richary J. Lynch	4,030	0.16%	N/A
Independent	Alene S. Ammond	3,330	0.13%	N/A
Independent	Tim Feeney	3,306	0.13%	N/A
Independent	Michael R. Scully	3,209	0.13%	N/A
Independent	Pete DiLauro	3,009	0.12%	N/A
Independent	Marilyn Arons	2,884	0.12%	N/A
Populist	John L. Kucek	2,822	0.11%	N/A
Independent	Tom Fuscaldo	2,314	0.09%	▼0.22
Independent	Michael Ziruolo	2,127	0.08%	▼0.37
Independent	Andrew J. Zemel	1,530	0.06%	N/A
Independent	Andrea Lippi	1,294	0.05%	N/A
Socialist Workers	Mark J. Rahn	1,242	0.05%	▼0.23
Independent	Jerry T. Grant	1,231	0.05%	N/A
Plurality		26,093	1.04%	
Turnout		2,505,964		
Republican gain from Democratic		Swing		

==== By county ====
County	Whitman %	Whitman votes	Florio %	Florio votes	Other %	Other votes
Atlantic	39.5%	25,833	58.4%	38,186	2.0%	1,328
Bergen	50.8%	157,710	47.4%	147,387	1.8%	5,594
Burlington	48.7%	59,760	48.1%	59,095	3.2%	3,951
Camden	34.8%	52,297	62.3%	93,686	2.9%	4,342
Cape May	44.2%	16,518	53.3%	19,904	2.5%	922
Cumberland	47.0%	17,066	50.2%	18,231	2.9%	1,028
Essex	39.6%	78,824	58.7%	116,891	1.7%	3,436
Gloucester	41.2%	31,252	55.3%	41,931	3.5%	2,709
Hudson	39.7%	54,144	58.7%	80,013	1.6%	2,217
Hunterdon	67.0%	28,304	30.6%	12,909	2.4%	1,024
Mercer	52.0%	57,599	45.9%	50,840	2.1%	2,407
Middlesex	48.4%	104,381	49.0%	105,679	2.7%	5,738
Monmouth	54.8%	111,303	42.8%	87,006	2.4%	4,859
Morris	61.9%	98,715	36.4%	58,028	1.8%	2,789
Ocean	51.4%	87,943	45.7%	78,132	2.8%	4,879
Passaic	52.9%	65,220	44.6%	55,086	2.5%	3,083
Salem	52.0%	11,171	42.7%	9,162	5.3%	1,146
Somerset	59.3%	55,444	38.6%	36,046	2.1%	1,933
Sussex	66.5%	28,614	30.3%	13,052	3.1%	1,373
Union	48.7%	76,359	48.8%	76,552	2.5%	3,950
Warren	57.0%	17,667	39.4%	12,215	3.5%	1,101

Counties that flipped from Democratic to Republican

- Bergen
- Burlington
- Mercer
- Monmouth
- Ocean
- Passaic
- Salem
- Somerset
