= St. Peter the Apostle High School =

Defunct Catholic high school

Coordinates: 40°29′47″N 74°27′2″W

St. Peter the Apostle High School was a Roman Catholic high school that operated in New Brunswick, in Middlesex County, in the U.S. state of New Jersey, that operated under the auspices of the Roman Catholic Diocese of Metuchen.

== History ==
Saint Peter the Apostle Church sponsored parochial schools from its early history. The Sisters of Charity of Convent Station were invited to staff the schools in 1867. In 1892, St. Peter's opened a new building, Columbia Hall, which would house the elementary school until 1960 and the high school until 1970.

The high school closed at the end of the 2006-07 school year in the wake of falling enrollment. Enrollment at the school had reached a thousand students in the 1960s but dropped to 165 in its final year of operation, leading the diocese and parish to conclude that they could "no longer sustain the enormous expense" of subsidizing annual deficits.

The school buildings were eventually sold to the City of New Brunswick, which housed a public school, in them, the Lincoln Annex School. In 2020 the Board of Education sold the school to the New Brunswick Development Corporation (DEVCO), which had the building demolished to make way for Jack and Sheryl Morris Cancer Center, a new facility of the Rutgers Cancer Institute of New Jersey.

== Athletics ==
The boys basketball team won the Non-Public Group A state championship in 1936 (defeating Our Lady of Good Counsel High School of Newark in the tournament final) and 1939 (vs. Immaculate Conception High School of Montclair), and won the Non-Public B title in 1968 (vs. St. Mary of the Assumption High School). The 1939 team won the Parochial Group II title (since reclassified by the NJSIAA as Non-Public A) with a 22-18 win against Immaculate Conception of Montclair. The 1968 team finished the season with a record of 63-59 win in the Parochial B championship game.

The girls tennis team won the Non-Public B state championship in 1983, defeating Pope John XXIII Regional High School in the tournament final.

The girls basketball team won the Non-Public B state title in 1985 (defeating St. Anthony High School in the tournament final), 1991 (vs. Immaculate Conception High School of Montclair) and 1992 (vs. DePaul Catholic High School). The 1992 team won the Non-Public B state title with a 69-56 win against DePaul in the finals at Rider College and entered the Tournament of Champions as the second seed, winning in the semis 69-56 against sixth-seeded South Hunterdon Regional High School before taking the ToC title in the finals played at the Meadowlands Arena by a score of 51-45 against fifth-seed Egg Harbor Township High School to cap off a 32-0 record for the season. Kristin Somogyi, who led the 1992 team scoring 37.9 points per game and named as the state's player of the year, set the New Jersey career scoring record with 3,899 points, breaking the record that had been set by her father in 1968.

== Notable alumni ==
Notable alumni of the school include:

- Jake Bornheimer (1927–1986), professional basketball player who played in the NBA for the Philadelphia Warriors
- James Bornheimer (1933–1993), politician who represented the 18th Legislative District in the New Jersey General Assembly from 1972 to 1982 and in the New Jersey Senate from 1982 to 1984.
- Chris Dailey (born 1959), women's basketball coach, who has been the associate head coach for the Connecticut Huskies women's basketball team since 1988.
- Joseph V. Egan (born 1938), politician who has represented the 17th Legislative District in the New Jersey General Assembly since 2002.
- Mary Ann Knowles (1946–2017), politician who served in the New Hampshire House of Representatives
- John A. Lynch Jr. (born 1938), politician who served in the New Jersey Senate from 1982 to 2002, where he represented the 17th Legislative District.
- John A. Lynch Sr. (1908–1978), politician who served in the New Jersey Senate, where he represented the 17th Legislative District.
