= Jeanne Fox =

American lawyer

President of the New Jersey Board of Public Utilities
- In office January 15, 2002 – January 2010
- Governor: James McGreevey; Richard Codey; Jon Corzine
- Succeeded by: Lee Solomon

Commissioner of the New Jersey Department of Environmental Protection
- In office August 1, 1993 – January 18, 1994
- Governor: James Florio
- Preceded by: Scott A. Weiner
- Succeeded by: Robert C. Shinn Jr.

Jeanne Fox is the former President of the New Jersey Board of Public Utilities. She was originally appointed to the position in 2002 by former Gov. James McGreevey and was retained in the Cabinets of former Gov. Richard Codey and Gov. Jon Corzine. Fox retired from the NJ BPU in September 2014 and was succeeded by Upendra J. Chivukula.

Fox was the first former BPU staffer to become a commissioner on the BPU. In the 1980s, Fox held several positions with the agency in water management. Prior to her positions at the BPU, she was an election lawyer for the New Jersey Department of State. From 1991 to 1994 she served under former Gov. James Florio as Deputy Commissioner of Environmental Protection and Energy and for several months at the end of Florio's term as Acting Commissioner of Environmental Protection and Energy. In addition she represented New Jersey on several interstate boards while at the DEP. From 1994 to 2001 she served as Regional Administrator for the U.S. Environmental Protection Agency in the administration of President Bill Clinton.
