= Kevin Egan (politician) =

American politician (born 1964)

Member of the New Jersey General Assembly from the 17th district
- Incumbent
- Assumed office January 9, 2024 Serving with Joseph Danielsen
- Preceded by: Joseph V. Egan

Personal details
- Born: June 2, 1964 (age 62)
- Party: Democratic
- Education: Rutgers University
- Website: Legislative webpage

Kevin P. Egan (born June 2, 1964) is an American Democratic Party politician serving as a member of the New Jersey General Assembly for the 17th legislative district, having taken office on January 9, 2024. He succeeded his father Joseph V. Egan, who served in the Assembly for 22 years.

== Biography ==
Egan attended Rutgers University and has been a resident of New Brunswick, New Jersey. He was an aide to Joseph V. Egan in the General Assembly, was employed by the New Jersey Schools Development Authority and has served on the Board of Governors of Rutgers University since 2021. He is employed as assistant business manager for Local 456 of the International Brotherhood of Electrical Workers.

== Elective office ==
He served on the New Brunswick City Council from 2011 until 2023.

Egan and his incumbent running mate Joseph Danielsen defeated Republicans Susan Hucko and Dhimant G. Patel in the 2023 New Jersey General Assembly election.

=== District 17 ===
Each of the 40 districts in the New Jersey Legislature has one representative in the New Jersey Senate and two members in the New Jersey General Assembly. The representatives from the 17th District for the 2024—2025 Legislative Session are:

- Senator Bob Smith (D)
- Assemblyman Joseph Danielsen (D)
- Assemblyman Kevin Egan (D)

== Electoral history ==
17th Legislative District General Election, 2023
Party	Candidate	Votes	%
Democratic	Kevin Egan	20,159	36.3
Democratic	Joseph Danielsen (incumbent)	20,064	36.2
Republican	Susan Hucko	7,771	14.0
Republican	Dhimant G. Patel	7,473	13.5
Total votes		55,467	100.0
Democratic hold			
Democratic hold			
