= John A. Lynch Jr. =

American politician (born 1938)

109th President of the New Jersey Senate
- In office January 9, 1990 – January 14, 1992
- Preceded by: John F. Russo
- Succeeded by: Donald DiFrancesco

Member of the New Jersey Senate from the 17th district
- In office January 12, 1982 – January 8, 2002
- Preceded by: William J. Hamilton
- Succeeded by: Bob Smith

Minority Leader of the New Jersey Senate
- In office January 14, 1992 – January 13, 1998
- Preceded by: John H. Dorsey
- Succeeded by: Richard Codey

61st Mayor of New Brunswick, New Jersey
- In office 1979–1991
- Preceded by: Gilbert L. Nelson
- Succeeded by: James M. Cahill

Personal details
- Born: October 21, 1938 (age 88) New Brunswick, New Jersey, U.S.
- Party: Democratic
- Education: College of the Holy Cross (BA); Georgetown University (LLB)

John A. Lynch Jr. (born October 21, 1938) is an American Democratic Party politician from New Jersey, who served in the New Jersey Senate from 1982 to 2002, where he represented the 17th Legislative District, and was Senate President from 1990 to 1992.

He was also the 61st Mayor of New Brunswick, New Jersey from 1979 to 1991.

== Biography ==
Lynch was born in New Brunswick in 1938, the son of John A. Lynch, Sr. and Evelyn Rooney. His father also served as both Mayor of New Brunswick and State Senator from Middlesex County (7th District). Lynch played prep basketball at St. Peter the Apostle High School, a key player on a team that was the runner-up in the 1956 Parochial A state championship. He attended the College of the Holy Cross and the Georgetown University Law Center.

Lynch was chosen in December 1989 to serve as Senate President, a position he held until 1991, when Republicans took control of the Senate. In 1997, after an unsuccessful effort to regain Democratic Party control of the Senate, Lynch stepped down from his position as the Minority Leader.

Bob Smith was elected in November 2001 to fill the seat vacated after Lynch retired.

=== Corruption ===
The U.S. Attorney's Office for the District of New Jersey began investigating Lynch in the mid-2000s for his business dealings. On September 15, 2006, Lynch pleaded guilty in the U.S. District Court on one count of mail fraud and one count of tax evasion for failing to report $150,000 in income received from a real estate transaction in 1999. On December 19, 2006, he was sentenced by Judge Stanley R. Chesler to three years and three months in prison, which he was required to begin serving by January 15, 2007. Lynch was also required to pay a $50,000 fine.

He had faced up to five years in federal prison and a fine of up to $250,000 on each count of the indictment. However, based on Federal Sentencing Guidelines, a sentence of between 33 and 41 months in prison and a fine of between $7,500 to $75,000 was expected. As of December 14, 2006, the court received 172 letters from citizens seeking leniency.

Lynch served two and a half years at Federal Correctional Institution, Loretto before being transferred to a halfway house in Newark, New Jersey in June 2009. He completed his sentence on November 13, 2009.

Political offices
Preceded by John F. Russo	President of the New Jersey Senate; 1990-1991	Succeeded by Donald DiFrancesco
Preceded by Gilbert L. Nelson	Mayor of New Brunswick, New Jersey; 1979–1991	Succeeded by James Cahill
