= William J. Hamilton =

American politician (1932–2019)

Member of the New Jersey Senate from the 17th Legislative District
- In office January 10, 1978 – January 12, 1982
- Preceded by: John A. Lynch Sr.
- Succeeded by: John A. Lynch Jr.

Speaker of the New Jersey General Assembly
- In office 1977
- Preceded by: Joseph A. LeFante
- Succeeded by: Christopher Jackman

Member of the New Jersey General Assembly
- In office January 11, 1972 – January 10, 1978
- Preceded by: Robert K. Haelig
- Succeeded by: David C. Schwartz
- Constituency: District 7A (1972–1974); 17th district (1974–1978)

Personal details
- Born: December 26, 1932 New Brunswick, New Jersey, U.S.
- Died: October 10, 2019 (aged 86)
- Party: Democratic

William J. Hamilton Jr. (December 26, 1932 – October 10, 2019) was an American Democratic Party politician from New Jersey, who served in both houses of the New Jersey Legislature, where he represented Middlesex County. He was Speaker of the New Jersey General Assembly for the 1977 session.

== Biography ==
Hamilton was born in New Brunswick, New Jersey to William J. Hamilton and May V. Mulligan. After receiving a B.A. degree from Rutgers University in 1954, he served as a United States Naval Aviator, rising to the rank of Lieutenant, Junior Grade and later to Captain in the Reserves. In 1960 he received a J.D. from Georgetown University. He moved to Florida, where he was a law clerk for U.S. District Court Judge John Milton Bryan Simpson (1960–1961) and an assistant U.S. attorney (1962–67).

Hamilton returned to New Brunswick, becoming a partner in the law firm of Hamilton and Mulligan. He served as New Brunswick director of municipal civil defense and disaster control in 1970. The following year he was elected to the New Jersey General Assembly from District 7-A encompassing western Middlesex County. In 1973 following a statewide redistricting, he was reelected to the Assembly from the new 17th Legislative District in Middlesex and Somerset counties. Hamilton served three terms, becoming assistant majority leader in 1974 and majority leader for the 1976 session. He was named Speaker in January 1977, following the election of incumbent Joseph A. LeFante to the United States House of Representatives.

Hamilton's term as Speaker ended after his election to the New Jersey Senate, replacing John A. Lynch Sr., in 1977. In 1981, rather than run for reelection, he sought the Democratic nomination for Governor of New Jersey in that year's election. However his candidacy was hurt in its early stages when key Municipal Chairs in his home county of Middlesex declined to endorse him. He stayed in the race and finished tenth in a field of thirteen. When his Senate term ended in 1982, he was succeeded in the 17th District senate seat by John A. Lynch Jr. and he returned to his New Brunswick law practice. He later became the city attorney of New Brunswick.

Hamilton married Barbara Brown in 1958, and the couple had four children. He resided in New Brunswick until his death on October 10, 2019, at the age of 86.

New Jersey General Assembly
Preceded by Robert K. Haelig	Member of the New Jersey General Assembly from the 7-A district January 11, 1972–January 8, 1974; Served alongside: Peter P. Garibaldi	Succeeded by District eliminated
Preceded by District created	Member of the New Jersey General Assembly from the 17th district January 8, 1974–January 10, 1978; Served alongside: Joseph D. Patero	Succeeded by David C. Schwartz
New Jersey Senate
Preceded by John A. Lynch Sr.	Member of the New Jersey Senate from the 17th district January 10, 1978–January 12, 1982	Succeeded by John A. Lynch Jr.
Political offices
Preceded by Joseph A. LeFante	Speaker of the New Jersey General Assembly; 1977	Succeeded by Christopher Jackman
