= John L. Miller (politician) =

American politician

John L. Miller Jr.

Member of the New Jersey Senate from the 3C district
- In office 1968–1973
- Preceded by: Frederick J. Scholz; A. Donald Bigley
- Succeeded by: Alene Ammond

Member of the New Jersey General Assembly
- In office 1966–1968

Personal details
- Born: August 6, 1925
- Died: January 1, 1989 (aged 63)
- Party: Republican
- Profession: Judge

John L. Miller Jr. (August 6, 1925 – January 1, 1989) was an American attorney, Republican politician, and judge who served in the New Jersey General Assembly from 1966 to 1968 and represented parts of Camden County the New Jersey Senate from 1968 to 1974. After losing re-election in 1973,

== Early life and education ==
Born on August 6, 1925, in Tarentum, Pennsylvania, Miller was raised in the Panama Canal Zone and graduated from Balboa High School. Miller earned an undergraduate degree at Glassboro State College (since renamed as Rowan University) and earned his law degree at Rutgers Law School.

== Biography ==
=== General Assembly ===
Miller was elected to the New Jersey General Assembly in 1965, where he served a single two-year term of office.

=== State Senate ===
Miller would be elected as a Republican to the third Senate seat of the third legislative district in 1967, beating Democrat Richard S. Hyland with 29,483 votes to Hyland's 18,454. Miller would be re-elected in 1971, this time facing Morton H. Rappaport, winning with 28,345 votes to Rappaport's 21,168. Going into the 1973 election, Miller's home would be redistricted into the 6th District, which he would attempt to challenge, but would lose to Democrat Alene S. Ammond with 24,072 votes to Ammond's 27,320.

=== Judge ===
Miller would be sworn in as Judge of the New Jersey Superior Court in Camden County in July 1981. A resident of Cherry Hill, New Jersey, he had been found guilty of allowing a jury to make a wrong decision shortly before his death, and was ordered to pay a fine of $80,500 in compensatory damages and $50,000 in punitive damages on December 12, 1988, he would die at the age of 63 on January 3, 1989.
