= Joseph V. Egan =

Member of the New Jersey General Assembly

Joseph Egan

Member of the New Jersey General Assembly from the 17th district
- In office January 8, 2002 – January 9, 2024 Serving with Joseph Danielsen
- Preceded by: Jerry Green; Bob Smith
- Succeeded by: Kevin Egan

Deputy Majority Leader of the New Jersey General Assembly
- In office January 8, 2008 – January 9, 2024
- Leader: Bonnie Watson Coleman; Joseph Cryan; Louis Greenwald
- Preceded by: Position Established

Chair of the New Jersey General Assembly Committee on Labor
- In office January 8, 2008 – January 9, 2024

Member of the New Brunswick City Council
- In office January 1, 1982 – December 31, 2010
- Succeeded by: Kevin Egan

Personal details
- Born: February 27, 1938 (age 87); New Brunswick, New Jersey
- Political party: Democratic
- Spouse: Yolanda Egan (married 1959 - her death 2019)
- Children: Four
- Website: Legislative website

Joseph V. Egan (born February 27, 1938) is an American Democratic Party politician, who represented the 17th Legislative District in the New Jersey General Assembly from 2002 to 2024. He was succeeded in the Assembly by his son, Kevin Egan.

Egan served in the General Assembly as the Deputy Majority Leader starting in 2008.

== Early life and education ==
Egan was born on February 27, 1938, in New Brunswick, New Jersey. He attended St. Peter the Apostle High School and shortly thereafter joined the International Brotherhood of Electrical Workers (I.B.E.W.) Local Union 456. He served on the New Brunswick City Council from 1982 to 2010 and was council president for nine years.

== New Jersey Assembly ==
In November 2001, Egan was elected to the General Assembly from the 17th District succeeding Bob Smith who was elected to the State Senate and Jerry Green who was redistricted to the 22nd District. From 2002 to 2010, Egan simultaneously held a seat in the New Jersey General Assembly and on the New Brunswick City Council. This dual position, often called double dipping, had been allowed under a grandfather clause in the state law enacted by the New Jersey Legislature and signed into law by Governor of New Jersey Jon Corzine in September 2007 that prevents dual-office-holding but allows those who had held both positions as of February 1, 2008, to retain both posts.

== Personal life ==
Egan is Business Manager for the I.B.E.W. Local 456. He is a former president of the union's executive board. Egan continues to reside in New Brunswick. He was married to his wife Yolanda from 1959 until her death in 2019; they shared four children and seven grandchildren. Egan's son Kevin succeeded him on the New Brunswick City Council after Egan retired from it in 2010. Egan is a member of the St. Peter The Apostle Church Parish and is a former vice president of the parish council. His son-in-law is Major League Baseball Hall of Famer Craig Biggio. Egan's grandson, Cavan Biggio, is a utility player for the Los Angeles Dodgers.

== Electoral history ==
=== New Jersey Assembly ===
New Jersey general election, 2017
Party	Candidate	Votes	%	±%
Democratic	Joseph V. Egan	29,149	36.0	▲2.1
Democratic	Joe Danielsen	28,425	35.1	▲1.2
Republican	Robert A. Quinn	11,317	14.0	▼2.0
Republican	Nadine Wilkins	11,131	13.8	▲0.1
It’s Our Time	Michael Habib	875	1.1	N/A
Total votes		'80,897'	'100.0'	

New Jersey general election, 2015
Party	Candidate	Votes	%	±%
Democratic	Joseph V. Egan	13,444	33.9	▲1.4
Democratic	Joseph F. Danielsen	13,426	33.9	▲2.0
Republican	Robert Mettler	6,362	16.0	▼2.8
Republican	Brajesh Singh	5,430	13.7	▼3.1
Green	Molly O’Brien	985	2.5	N/A
Total votes		'39,647'	'100.0'	

New Jersey general election, 2013
Party	Candidate	Votes	%	±%
Democratic	Joseph V. Egan	23,763	32.5	▲0.6
Democratic	Upendra Chivukula	23,331	31.9	▲0.6
Republican	Carlo DiLalla	13,762	18.8	▲0.6
Republican	Sanjay Patel	12,281	16.8	▼1.9
Total votes		'73,137'	'100.0'	

New Jersey general election, 2011
Party	Candidate	Votes	%
Democratic	Joseph V. Egan	15,165	31.9
Democratic	Upendra Chivukula	14,862	31.3
Republican	Robert S. Mettler	8,876	18.7
Republican	Carlo A. DiLalla	8,627	18.2
Total votes		47,530	100.0

New Jersey general election, 2009
Party	Candidate	Votes	%	±%
Democratic	Joseph V. Egan	29,876	32.4	▲1.2
Democratic	Upendra J. Chivukula	28,030	30.4	▲0.5
Republican	Anthony Mazzola	18,023	19.5	▼0.1
Republican	Salim A. Nathoo	16,419	17.8	▼1.6
Total votes		'92,348'	'100.0'	

New Jersey general election, 2007
Party	Candidate	Votes	%	±%
Democratic	Joseph V. Egan	16,456	31.2	▼2.8
Democratic	Upendra J. Chivukula	15,765	29.9	▼2.5
Republican	Matthew "Skip" House	10,324	19.6	▲1.5
Republican	Leonard J. Messineo	10,257	19.4	▲3.9
Total votes		'52,802'	'100.0'	

New Jersey general election, 2005
Party	Candidate	Votes	%	±%
Democratic	Joseph V. Egan	29,601	34.0	▲5.2
Democratic	Upendra J. Chivukula	28,239	32.4	▲3.9
Republican	Catherine J. Barrier	15,748	18.1	▼1.5
Republican	Salim A. Nathoo	13,507	15.5	▼2.7
Total votes		'87,095'	'100.0'	

New Jersey general election, 2003
Party	Candidate	Votes	%	±%
Democratic	Joseph V. Egan	16,143	28.8	▼5.0
Democratic	Upendra Chivukula	15,956	28.5	▼3.4
Republican	Catherine J. Barrier	10,988	19.6	▲2.4
Republican	Scott Johnkins	10,206	18.2	▲1.1
Green	Josephine M. Giaimo	1,388	2.5	N/A
Green	David Hochfelder	1,298	2.3	N/A
Total votes		'55,979'	'100.0'	

New Jersey general election, 2001
Party	Candidate	Votes	%
Democratic	Joseph V. Egan	27,948	33.8
Democratic	Upendra J. Chivukula	26,374	31.9
Republican	Catherine Barrier	14,161	17.2
Republican	Anthony Mazzola	14,085	17.1
Total votes		82,568	100.0

New Jersey General Assembly
Preceded by Jerry Green	Member of the New Jersey General Assembly for the 17th District; January 8, 2002 – Present; With: Upendra J. Chivukula, Joseph Danielsen	Succeeded by Incumbent
