= New Jersey's 17th legislative district =

American legislative district

- Senator: Bob Smith (D)
- Assembly members: Joseph Danielsen (D); Kevin Egan (D)
- Registration: 46.09% Democratic; 13.25% Republican; 39.46% unaffiliated
- Demographics: 30.3% White; 18.9% Black/African American; 0.8% Native American; 24.3% Asian; 0.0% Hawaiian/Pacific Islander; 16.5% Other race; 9.0% Two or more races; 26.8% Hispanic
- Population: 235,376
- Voting-age population: 188,877
- Registered voters: 149,525

New Jersey's 17th legislative district is one of 40 in the New Jersey Legislature. The district includes the Middlesex County municipalities of New Brunswick, North Brunswick, Piscataway, along with the Somerset County municipalities of Franklin Township and South Bound Brook.

== Demographic characteristics ==
As of the 2020 United States census, the district had a population of 235,376, of whom 188,877 (80.2%) were of voting age. The racial makeup of the district was 71,398 (30.3%) White, 44,522 (18.9%) African American, 1,963 (0.8%) Native American, 57,211 (24.3%) Asian, 113 (0.0%) Pacific Islander, 38,911 (16.5%) from some other race, and 21,258 (9.0%) from two or more races. Hispanic or Latino of any race were 63,076 (26.8%) of the population.

The district had 149,525 registered voters as of December 1, 2021, of whom 58,590 (39.2%) were registered as Unaffiliated, 70,819 (47.4%) were registered as Democrats, 18,119 (12.1%) were registered as Republicans, and 1,997 (1.3%) were registered to other parties.

Homeownership was high. The district had a large population of Asian Americans, third highest in the state, while having the third-smallest population of senior citizens among the 40 legislative districts. Registered Democrats outnumbered Republicans by a 3 to 1 margin.

== Political representation ==
For the 2026–2027 session, the 17th legislative district of the New Jersey Legislature is represented in the State Senate by Bob Smith (D, Piscataway) and in the General Assembly by Joseph Danielsen (D, Franklin Township) and Kevin Egan (D, New Brunswick).

The legislative district overlaps with New Jersey's 6th and 12th congressional districts.

== Apportionment history ==
Since the 1973 creation of the 40-district legislative map, the 17th district has always been anchored by the city of New Brunswick and Piscataway Township. The 1973 iteration of the district also included Franklin Township and Manville in Somerset County and Highland Park, Middlesex, Dunellen, and South Plainfield. In the 1981 redistricting, the two Somerset County municipalities were shifted to the 14th district while the 17th picked up the Union County city of Plainfield. Dunellen was removed under the 1991 redistricting, but Somerset's Bound Brook was added.

As part of the 2001 apportionment, based on the results of the 2000 United States census, changes were made which removed Bound Brook (moved to the 16th district), Middlesex Borough and Plainfield City (to the 22nd district) and South Plainfield borough (to the 18th district) and added Franklin Township (from the 16th legislative district), Milltown Borough and North Brunswick Township (also from the 18th district).

Changes to the district made as part of the New Jersey Legislative apportionment in 2011, based on the results of the 2010 census resulted in the removal of Highland Park (to the 18th district).

After 20 years in office, John A. Lynch Sr. did not run for re-election in 1977, due to illness. Assembly Speaker William J. Hamilton ran for the vacant Senate seat and Joseph D. Patero and David C. Schwartz were the Democratic candidates for Assembly in a district that voted for Democrats by a 2-1 margin.

After losing the support of the Middlesex County Democratic Organization, Assemblymember Angela L. Perun announced in March 1985 that she had switched parties and would run as a Republican in that year's general election, after having served two terms in office as a Democrat and having been a vocal opponent of the Reagan Administration. Piscataway mayor Bob Smith was given Perun's spot and the Assembly ballot, and he won election together with incumbent David C. Schwartz.

Despite his confidence that he would win re-election if he chose to run, David C. Schwartz decided not to run for re-election in 1991 after seven terms of office, saying that he was reluctant to serve in the minority party in the new legislative term. Jerry Green took Schwartz's open seat in the general Election.

Bob Smith was elected to his first Senate term in November 2001 to fill the seat vacated after Lynch retired. Jerry Green was relocated to the 22nd legislative district in redistricting following the 2000 United States census, and the two open Assembly seats were filled by Upendra J. Chivukula and Joseph V. Egan. Chivukula's election made him the first South Asian to be elected to the New Jersey Legislature and the third Indian American to be elected to a state assembly in the United States. Joseph Danielsen was sworn into the New Jersey General Assembly on October 16, 2014 to fill the vacant seat of Upendra J. Chivukula, who left office to take a seat as a Commissioner on the New Jersey Board of Public Utilities.

Owing to Middlesex County's strong Democratic leanings, the 17th district has never elected a Republican legislator, only being briefly represented by one when Perun switched parties in 1985.

== Election history ==
Session	Senate	General Assembly	
1974–1975	John A. Lynch Sr. (D)	William J. Hamilton (D)	Joseph D. Patero (D)
1976–1977	John A. Lynch Sr. (D)	William J. Hamilton (D)	Joseph D. Patero (D)
1978–1979	William J. Hamilton (D)	David C. Schwartz (D)	Joseph D. Patero (D)
1980–1981	William J. Hamilton (D)	David C. Schwartz (D)	Joseph D. Patero (D)
1982–1983	John A. Lynch Jr. (D)	David C. Schwartz (D)	Angela L. Perun (D)
1984–1985	John A. Lynch Jr. (D)	David C. Schwartz (D)	Angela L. Perun (D)
1984–1985	John A. Lynch Jr. (D)	David C. Schwartz (D)	Angela L. Perun (R) (Note: Switched parties on March 14, 1985)
1986–1987	John A. Lynch Jr. (D)	David C. Schwartz (D)	Bob Smith (D)
1988–1989	John A. Lynch Jr. (D)	David C. Schwartz (D)	Bob Smith (D)
1990–1991	John A. Lynch Jr. (D)	David C. Schwartz (D)	Bob Smith (D)
1992–1993	John A. Lynch Jr. (D)	Jerry Green (D)	Bob Smith (D)
1994–1995	John A. Lynch Jr. (D)	Jerry Green (D)	Bob Smith (D)
1996–1997	John A. Lynch Jr. (D)	Jerry Green (D)	Bob Smith (D)
1998–1999	John A. Lynch Jr. (D)	Jerry Green (D)	Bob Smith (D)
2000–2001	John A. Lynch Jr. (D)	Jerry Green (D)	Bob Smith (D)
2002–2003	Bob Smith (D)	Joseph V. Egan (D)	Upendra J. Chivukula (D)
2004–2005	Bob Smith (D)	Joseph V. Egan (D)	Upendra J. Chivukula (D)
2006–2007	Bob Smith (D)	Joseph V. Egan (D)	Upendra J. Chivukula (D)
2008–2009	Bob Smith (D)	Joseph V. Egan (D)	Upendra J. Chivukula (D)
2010–2011	Bob Smith (D)	Joseph V. Egan (D)	Upendra J. Chivukula (D)
2012–2013	Bob Smith (D)	Joseph V. Egan (D)	Upendra J. Chivukula (D)
2014–2015	Bob Smith (D)	Joseph V. Egan (D)	Upendra J. Chivukula (D) (Note: Resigned September 30, 2014 to become a Board of Public Utilities commissioner)
2014–2015	Bob Smith (D)	Joseph V. Egan (D)	Joseph Danielsen (D) (Note: Appointed to the Assembly on October 16, 2014)
2016–2017	Bob Smith (D)	Joseph V. Egan (D)	Joseph Danielsen (D)
2018–2019	Bob Smith (D)	Joseph V. Egan (D)	Joseph Danielsen (D)
2020–2021	Bob Smith (D)	Joseph V. Egan (D)	Joseph Danielsen (D)
2022–2023	Bob Smith (D)	Joseph V. Egan (D)	Joseph Danielsen (D)
2024–2025	Bob Smith (D)	Kevin Egan (D)	Joseph Danielsen (D)
2026–2027	Bob Smith (D)	Kevin Egan (D)	Joseph Danielsen (D)

== Election results ==
=== Senate ===
2021 New Jersey general election
Party	Candidate	Votes	%	±%
Democratic	Bob Smith	32,455	69.1	▼2.3
Republican	James A. Abate	14,505	30.9	▲2.3
Total votes		46,960	100.0	

New Jersey general election, 2017
Party	Candidate	Votes	%	±%
Democratic	Bob Smith	29,816	71.4	▲11.6
Republican	Daryl J. Kipnis	11,921	28.6	▼11.6
Total votes		41,737	100.0	

New Jersey general election, 2013
Party	Candidate	Votes	%	±%
Democratic	Bob Smith	22,920	59.8	▼4.2
Republican	Brian D. Levine	15,403	40.2	▲4.2
Total votes		38,323	100.0	

2011 New Jersey general election
Party	Candidate	Votes	%
Democratic	Bob Smith	15,507	64.0
Republican	Jordan Rickards	8,715	36.0
Total votes		24,222	100.0

2007 New Jersey general election
Party	Candidate	Votes	%	±%
Democratic	Bob Smith	16,898	61.7	▲0.7
Republican	John Costello	10,506	38.3	▼0.7
Total votes		27,404	100.0	

2003 New Jersey general election
Party	Candidate	Votes	%	±%
Democratic	Bob Smith	17,438	61.0	▼7.9
Republican	Jeffrey M. Orbach	11,168	39.0	▲7.9
Total votes		28,606	100.0	

2001 New Jersey general election
Party	Candidate	Votes	%
Democratic	Bob Smith	29,290	68.9
Republican	Matthew "Skip" House	13,216	31.1
Total votes		42,506	100.0

1997 New Jersey general election
Party	Candidate	Votes	%	±%
Democratic	John Lynch	27,748	68.0	▲11.3
Republican	Timothy J. O’Brien	13,061	32.0	▼2.2
Total votes		40,809	100.0	

1993 New Jersey general election
Party	Candidate	Votes	%	±%
Democratic	John Lynch	24,806	56.7	▲4.7
Republican	Edward R. Tiller	14,981	34.2	▼13.8
Independent	Valorie Caffee	3,989	9.1	N/A
Total votes		43,776	100.0	

1991 New Jersey general election
Party	Candidate	Votes	%
Democratic	John A. Lynch	17,053	52.0
Republican	Edward R. Tiller	15,718	48.0
Total votes		32,771	100.0

1987 New Jersey general election
Party	Candidate	Votes	%	±%
Democratic	John A. Lynch	18,585	63.4	▼1.9
Republican	James J. Spera	10,729	36.6	▲1.9
Total votes		29,314	100.0	

1983 New Jersey general election
Party	Candidate	Votes	%	±%
Democratic	John A. Lynch	19,703	65.3	▲4.7
Republican	Frank A. Santoro	10,449	34.7	▼1.2
Total votes		30,152	100.0	

1981 New Jersey general election
Party	Candidate	Votes	%
Democratic	John A. Lynch	25,761	60.6
Republican	Donald J. Douglas	15,280	35.9
Citizens	Paul Lennon	1,484	3.5
Total votes		42,525	100.0

1977 New Jersey general election
Party	Candidate	Votes	%	±%
Democratic	William J. Hamilton, Jr.	26,343	59.7	▼11.0
Republican	Peter J. Selesky	16,183	36.7	▲8.3
Independent Candidate	Walter Jinotti	985	2.2	N/A
Repeal Income Tax	Edward J. McGlynn	638	1.4	N/A
Total votes		44,149	100.0	

1973 New Jersey general election
Party	Candidate	Votes	%
Democratic	John A. Lynch	30,912	70.7
Republican	Dominic R. Ciardi	12,434	28.4
American	John Giammarco	381	0.9
Total votes		43,727	100.0

=== General Assembly ===
2021 New Jersey general election
Party	Candidate	Votes	%	±%
Democratic	Joseph V. Egan	32,212	34.8	▼1.7
Democratic	Joseph Danielsen	31,625	34.2	▼2.1
Republican	Catherine Barrier	14,482	15.7	▲2.1
Republican	Peter W. Gabra	14,173	15.3	▲1.7
Total votes		92,492	100.0	

2019 New Jersey general election
Party	Candidate	Votes	%	±%
Democratic	Joseph V. Egan	20,999	36.5	▲0.5
Democratic	Joe Danielsen	20,844	36.3	▲1.2
Republican	Patricia Badovinac	7,822	13.6	▼0.4
Republican	Maria Concepcion Powell	7,798	13.6	▼0.2
Total votes		57,463	100.0	

New Jersey general election, 2017
Party	Candidate	Votes	%	±%
Democratic	Joseph V. Egan	29,149	36.0	▲2.1
Democratic	Joe Danielsen	28,425	35.1	▲1.2
Republican	Robert A. Quinn	11,317	14.0	▼2.0
Republican	Nadine Wilkins	11,131	13.8	▲0.1
It’s Our Time	Michael Habib	875	1.1	N/A
Total votes		80,897	100.0	

New Jersey general election, 2015
Party	Candidate	Votes	%	±%
Democratic	Joseph V. Egan	13,444	33.9	▲1.4
Democratic	Joseph F. Danielsen	13,426	33.9	▲2.0
Republican	Robert Mettler	6,362	16.0	▼2.8
Republican	Brajesh Singh	5,430	13.7	▼3.1
Green	Molly O’Brien	985	2.5	N/A
Total votes		39,647	100.0	

New Jersey general election, 2013
Party	Candidate	Votes	%	±%
Democratic	Joseph V. Egan	23,763	32.5	▲0.6
Democratic	Upendra Chivukula	23,331	31.9	▲0.6
Republican	Carlo DiLalla	13,762	18.8	▲0.6
Republican	Sanjay Patel	12,281	16.8	▼1.9
Total votes		73,137	100.0	

New Jersey general election, 2011
Party	Candidate	Votes	%
Democratic	Joseph V. Egan	15,165	31.9
Democratic	Upendra Chivukula	14,862	31.3
Republican	Robert S. Mettler	8,876	18.7
Republican	Carlo A. DiLalla	8,627	18.2
Total votes		47,530	100.0

New Jersey general election, 2009
Party	Candidate	Votes	%	±%
Democratic	Joseph V. Egan	29,876	32.4	▲1.2
Democratic	Upendra J. Chivukula	28,030	30.4	▲0.5
Republican	Anthony Mazzola	18,023	19.5	▼0.1
Republican	Salim A. Nathoo	16,419	17.8	▼1.6
Total votes		92,348	100.0	

New Jersey general election, 2007
Party	Candidate	Votes	%	±%
Democratic	Joseph V. Egan	16,456	31.2	▼2.8
Democratic	Upendra J. Chivukula	15,765	29.9	▼2.5
Republican	Matthew "Skip" House	10,324	19.6	▲1.5
Republican	Leonard J. Messineo	10,257	19.4	▲3.9
Total votes		52,802	100.0	

New Jersey general election, 2005
Party	Candidate	Votes	%	±%
Democratic	Joseph V. Egan	29,601	34.0	▲5.2
Democratic	Upendra J. Chivukula	28,239	32.4	▲3.9
Republican	Catherine J. Barrier	15,748	18.1	▼1.5
Republican	Salim A. Nathoo	13,507	15.5	▼2.7
Total votes		87,095	100.0	

New Jersey general election, 2003
Party	Candidate	Votes	%	±%
Democratic	Joseph V. Egan	16,143	28.8	▼5.0
Democratic	Upendra Chivukula	15,956	28.5	▼3.4
Republican	Catherine J. Barrier	10,988	19.6	▲2.4
Republican	Scott Johnkins	10,206	18.2	▲1.1
Green	Josephine M. Giaimo	1,388	2.5	N/A
Green	David Hochfelder	1,298	2.3	N/A
Total votes		55,979	100.0	

New Jersey general election, 2001
Party	Candidate	Votes	%
Democratic	Joseph V. Egan	27,948	33.8
Democratic	Upendra J. Chivukula	26,374	31.9
Republican	Catherine Barrier	14,161	17.2
Republican	Anthony Mazzola	14,085	17.1
Total votes		82,568	100.0

New Jersey general election, 1999
Party	Candidate	Votes	%	±%
Democratic	Bob Smith	14,516	37.3	▲2.8
Democratic	Jerry Green	13,522	34.7	▲2.3
Republican	Tracy Ford	5,624	14.4	▼2.1
Republican	Daniel N. Epstein	5,275	13.5	▼1.1
Total votes		38,937	100.0	

New Jersey general election, 1997
Party	Candidate	Votes	%	±%
Democratic	Bob Smith	27,802	34.5	▲0.9
Democratic	Jerry Green	26,135	32.4	▼0.3
Republican	Phyllis A. Mason	13,310	16.5	▲2.0
Republican	Daniel N. Epstein	11,803	14.6	▲0.7
Conservative	Pat M. Iurilli	802	1.0	▼1.8
Conservative	Joy Norsworthy	778	1.0	▼1.4
Total votes		80,630	100.0	

New Jersey general election, 1995
Party	Candidate	Votes	%	±%
Democratic	Bob Smith	17,068	33.6	▲1.6
Democratic	Jerry Green	16,611	32.7	▲1.7
Republican	Michael De Nardo	7,367	14.5	▼4.2
Republican	Michael Ullnick	7,043	13.9	▼4.5
Conservative	Richard Rutkowski	1,441	2.8	N/A
Conservative	Erich Sturn	1,201	2.4	N/A
Total votes		50,731	100.0	

New Jersey general election, 1993
Party	Candidate	Votes	%	±%
Democratic	Bob Smith	26,480	32.0	▲5.9
Democratic	Jerry Green	25,633	31.0	▲6.1
Republican	Al Smith	15,463	18.7	▼4.3
Republican	John H. Bresnan	15,217	18.4	▼4.1
Total votes		82,793	100.0	

1991 New Jersey general election
Party	Candidate	Votes	%
Democratic	Bob Smith	17,206	26.1
Democratic	Jerry Green	16,449	24.9
Republican	Barbara “Bobbie” Weigel	15,165	23.0
Republican	Frank A. Santoro	14,827	22.5
Equal Justice Committee	Moses Williams	818	1.2
Populist	Al Olszewski	759	1.2
The People's Voice	Joseph S. Ginn	728	1.1
Total votes		65,952	100.0

1989 New Jersey general election
Party	Candidate	Votes	%	±%
Democratic	Bob Smith	26,999	33.6	▲2.4
Democratic	David C. Schwartz	26,720	33.3	▲1.4
Republican	George B. Gore	13,155	16.4	▼2.2
Republican	Csilla Soproni	12,270	15.3	▼2.9
Time For Change	Joseph F. Scalera III	1,210	1.5	N/A
Total votes		80,354	100.0	

1987 New Jersey general election
Party	Candidate	Votes	%	±%
Democratic	David C. Schwartz	18,455	31.9	▲3.8
Democratic	Robert G. Smith	18,047	31.2	▲5.2
Republican	Dorothy Sonnenberg	10,780	18.6	▼6.8
Republican	Peter J. Selesky	10,529	18.2	▼2.4
Total votes		57,811	100.0	

1985 New Jersey general election
Party	Candidate	Votes	%	±%
Democratic	David C. Schwartz	21,174	28.1	▼4.4
Democratic	Robert G. Smith	19,556	26.0	▼6.1
Republican	Angela L. Perun	19,104	25.4	▲7.4 (▼6.7)
Republican	Francis J. Coury	15,503	20.6	▲4.1
Total votes		75,337	100.0	

New Jersey general election, 1983
Party	Candidate	Votes	%	±%
Democratic	David C. Schwartz	19,116	32.5	▲0.6
Democratic	Angela L. Perun	18,866	32.1	▲1.4
Republican	James I. Plummer	10,593	18.0	▼1.0
Republican	Charles M. Bivona	9,703	16.5	▼1.8
Libertarian	Rich Hoegberg	519	0.9	N/A
Total votes		58,797	100.0	

New Jersey general election, 1981
Party	Candidate	Votes	%
Democratic	David C. Schwartz	26,261	31.9
Democratic	Angela L. Perun	25,315	30.7
Republican	John F. Wilson	15,667	19.0
Republican	Gertrude “Trudy” Christiansen	15,105	18.3
Total votes		82,348	100.0

New Jersey general election, 1979
Party	Candidate	Votes	%	±%
Democratic	Joseph D. Patero	20,219	31.7	▲1.8
Democratic	David C. Schwartz	20,032	31.4	▲3.1
Republican	William H. Christensen	12,082	18.9	▼0.5
Republican	Robert M. Sherr III	11,543	18.1	▼1.3
Total votes		63,876	100.0	

New Jersey general election, 1977
Party	Candidate	Votes	%	±%
Democratic	Joseph D. Patero	25,962	29.9	▲1.8
Democratic	David C. Schwartz	24,608	28.3	▼0.2
Republican	Jeffrey M. Brindle	16,850	19.4	▼2.7
Republican	Charles B. W. Durand	16,828	19.4	▼1.9
Independent “D”	James D. Nichols	1,288	1.5	N/A
Independent	Robert J. Zednick	664	0.8	N/A
Libertarian	William Stewart	382	0.4	N/A
Libertarian	Michael Fieschko	375	0.4	N/A
Total votes		86,957	100.0	

New Jersey general election, 1975
Party	Candidate	Votes	%	±%
Democratic	William J. Hamilton, Jr.	21,776	28.5	▼5.2
Democratic	Joseph D. Patero	21,446	28.1	▼5.7
Republican	Charles F. Williams	16,844	22.1	▲5.6
Republican	Kenneth C. Brennan	16,260	21.3	▲5.9
Total votes		76,326	100.0	

New Jersey general election, 1973
Party	Candidate	Votes	%
Democratic	Joseph D. Patero	29,186	33.8
Democratic	William J. Hamilton, Jr.	29,150	33.7
Republican	Elizabeth T. Lyons	14,303	16.5
Republican	Bruce H. Williams	13,340	15.4
Independent United	Aaron G. Bode	454	0.5
Total votes		86,433	100.0
