= Bob Smith (New Jersey politician) =

American politician from New Jersey (born 1947)

Member of the New Jersey Senate from the 17th district
- Incumbent
- Assumed office January 8, 2002
- Preceded by: John Lynch

Member of the New Jersey General Assembly from the 17th district
- In office January 14, 1986 – January 8, 2002
- Preceded by: Angela L. Perun
- Succeeded by: Upendra Chivukula; Joseph V. Egan

Mayor of Piscataway
- In office January 1, 1981 – January 14, 1986

Member of Piscataway Township Council
- In office January 1, 1977 – December 31, 1980

Personal details
- Born: March 25, 1947 (age 79)
- Party: Democratic
- Spouse: Ellen
- Education: B.A. University of Scranton (History); M.S. University of Scranton (Chemistry); M.S. Rutgers University (Environmental Science); J.D. Seton Hall University School of Law
- Occupation: Attorney
- Website: Legislative Website

Bob Smith (born March 25, 1947) is an American Democratic Party politician, who has been serving in the New Jersey State Senate since 2002, where he represents the 17th Legislative District. Smith was elected to his first Senate term in November 2001 to fill the seat vacated by the retirement of John Lynch. Smith serves in the Senate on the Environment Committee (as Chair) and the Judiciary Committee.

== Early life ==
Smith received a B.A. degree in 1969 from the University of Scranton in History, an M.S. in 1970 from the University of Scranton in Chemistry, an M.S. in 1973 from Rutgers University in Environmental Science and was awarded a J.D. in 1981 from the Seton Hall University School of Law. Smith taught environmental science and chemistry at Middlesex County College for 15 years. By profession, Senator Smith is an attorney. Smith served as Mayor of Piscataway, New Jersey from 1981 to 1986, served on the Piscataway Township Council from 1977 to 1980, its Planning Board from 1975 to 1986 (as its Chair in 1976) and on the Piscataway Environmental Committee from 1971 to 1975.

== New Jersey Assembly ==
Before being elected to the State Senate, Smith served in the General Assembly, the lower house of the New Jersey Legislature, from 1986 to 2001. In the Assembly, Smith served as the Deputy Minority Leader from 1994 to 1995 and as the Parliamentarian from 1988 to 1989.

== New Jersey Senate ==
Smith sponsored and passed laws dealing with such matters as increasing penalties for violations of environmental laws, repairing outmoded combined sewer systems, and reforming the state's oil spill prevention efforts. Senator Smith's legislative accomplishments include authoring the Ocean Pollution Bounty Act, Sludge Management Act, Oil Spill Prevention Act, the Worker and Community Right to Know Act and the Clean Water Enforcement Act. He has sought the enactment of laws affording greater protection to child victims of abuse and sponsored bills to increase the penalties for carjacking.

In 2020, he was one of the co-sponsors of Assembly Bill 4454 (now N.J.S.A. 18A:35-4.36a) which requires that a curriculum on diversity and inclusion be part of the school curriculum for students in kindergarten through twelfth grade.

=== Committee assignments ===
Committee assignments for the 2024—2025 Legislative Session are:

- Environment and Energy (as chair)
- Judiciary

=== District 17 ===
Each of the 40 districts in the New Jersey Legislature has one representative in the New Jersey Senate and two members in the New Jersey General Assembly. The representatives from the 17th District for the 2024—2025 Legislative Session are:

- Senator Bob Smith (D)
- Assemblyman Joseph Danielsen (D)
- Assemblyman Kevin Egan (D)

== Electoral history ==
=== Senate ===
17th Legislative District General Election, 2023
Party	Candidate	Votes	%
Democratic	Bob Smith (incumbent)	20,643	72.8
Republican	William P. Mikita Jr.	7,718	27.2
Total votes		28,361	100.0
Democratic hold			

17th Legislative District general election, 2021
Party	Candidate	Votes	%
Democratic	Bob Smith (incumbent)	32,455	69.11
Republican	James A. Abate	14,505	30.89
Total votes		46,960	100.0
Democratic hold			

New Jersey general election, 2017
Party	Candidate	Votes	%	±%
Democratic	Bob Smith	29,816	71.4	▲11.6
Republican	Daryl J. Kipnis	11,921	28.6	▼11.6
Total votes		41,737	100.0	

New Jersey State Senate elections, 2013
Party	Candidate	Votes	%
Democratic	Bob Smith (incumbent)	22,920	59.8
Republican	Brian D. Levine	15,403	40.2
Democratic hold			

New Jersey State Senate elections, 2011
Party	Candidate	Votes	%
Democratic	Bob Smith (incumbent)	15,507	64.0
Republican	Jordan Rickards	8,715	36.0
Democratic hold			

New Jersey State Senate elections, 2007
Party	Candidate	Votes	%
Democratic	Bob Smith (incumbent)	16,898	61.7
Republican	John Costello	10,506	38.3
Democratic hold			

New Jersey State Senate elections, 2003
Party	Candidate	Votes	%
Democratic	Bob Smith (incumbent)	17,438	61.0
Republican	Jeffrey M. Orbach	11,168	39.0
Democratic hold			

New Jersey State Senate elections, 2001
Party	Candidate	Votes	%
Democratic	Bob Smith	29,290	68.9
Republican	Matthew "Skip" House	13,216	31.1
Democratic hold			

=== Assembly ===
New Jersey General Assembly elections, 1999
Party	Candidate	Votes	%
Democratic	Bob Smith (incumbent)	11,946	37.2
Democratic	Jerry Green (incumbent)	10,963	34.2
Republican	Tracy Ford	4,727	14.7
Republican	Daniel N. Epstein	4,463	13.9
Democratic hold			

New Jersey General Assembly elections, 1997
Party	Candidate	Votes	%
Democratic	Bob Smith (incumbent)	27,802	34.5
Democratic	Jerry Green (incumbent)	26,135	32.4
Republican	Phyllis A. Mason	13,310	16.5
Republican	Daniel N. Epstein	11,803	14.6
Independent	Pat M. Iurilli	802	1.0
Independent	Joy Norsworthy	778	1.0
Democratic hold			

New Jersey General Assembly elections, 1995
Party	Candidate	Votes	%
Democratic	Bob Smith (incumbent)	17,068	33.6
Democratic	Jerry Green (incumbent)	16,611	32.7
Republican	Michael De Nardo	7,367	14.5
Republican	Michael Ullnick	7,043	13.9
Independent	Richard Rutkowski	1,441	2.8
Independent	Erich Sturn	1,201	2.4
Democratic hold			

New Jersey General Assembly elections, 1993
Party	Candidate	Votes	%
Democratic	Bob Smith (incumbent)	26,480	32.0
Democratic	Jerry Green (incumbent)	25,633	31.0
Republican	Al Smith	15,463	18.7
Republican	John H. Bresnan	15,217	18.4
Democratic hold			

New Jersey General Assembly elections, 1991
Party	Candidate	Votes	%
Democratic	Bob Smith (incumbent)	17,206	26.1
Democratic	Jerry Green	16,449	24.9
Republican	Barbara "Bobbie" Weigel	15,165	23.0
Republican	Frank A. Santoro	14,827	22.5
Independent	Moses Williams	818	1.2
Independent	Al Olszewski	759	1.2
Independent	Joseph S. Ginn	728	1.1
Democratic hold			

New Jersey General Assembly elections, 1989
Party	Candidate	Votes	%
Democratic	Bob Smith (incumbent)	26,999	33.6
Democratic	David C. Schwartz (incumbent)	26,720	33.3
Republican	George B. Gore	13,155	16.4
Republican	Csilla Soproni	12,270	15.3
Independent	Joseph F. Scalera III	1,210	1.5
Democratic hold			

New Jersey General Assembly elections, 1987
Party	Candidate	Votes	%
Democratic	David C. Schwartz (incumbent)	18,455	31.9
Democratic	Bob Smith (incumbent)	18,047	31.2
Republican	Dorothy Sonnenberg	10,780	18.6
Republican	Peter J. Selesky	10,529	18.2
Democratic hold			

New Jersey General Assembly elections, 1985
Party	Candidate	Votes	%
Democratic	David C. Schwartz (incumbent)	21,174	28.1
Democratic	Bob Smith	19,556	26.0
Republican	Angela L. Perun (incumbent)	19,104	25.4
Republican	Francis J. Coury	15,503	20.6
Democratic hold			

New Jersey Senate
Preceded by John Lynch	Member of the New Jersey Senate for the 17th District; January 8, 2002 – present	Succeeded by Incumbent
New Jersey General Assembly
Preceded by Angela L. Perun	Member of the New Jersey General Assembly for the 17th District; January 14, 1986 – January 8, 2002; With: David C. Schwartz, Jerry Green	Succeeded by Upendra Chivukula; Joseph V. Egan
