= Upendra J. Chivukula =

American politician

Upendra Chivukula
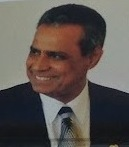

Member of the New Jersey Board of Public Utilities
- Incumbent
- Assumed office September 30, 2014
- Appointed by: Chris Christie
- Preceded by: Jeanne Fox

Member of the New Jersey General Assembly from the 17th district
- In office January 8, 2002 – September 30, 2014
- Preceded by: Jerry Green; Bob Smith
- Succeeded by: Joseph Danielsen

Mayor of Franklin Township, Somerset County, New Jersey
- In office January 1, 2000 – December 31, 2000

Deputy Mayor of Franklin Township
- In office January 1, 1998 – December 31, 1998

Member of the Franklin Township Council from the 5th Ward
- In office January 1, 1998 – December 31, 2005
- Preceded by: Jack Shreve
- Succeeded by: James Vassanella

Personal details
- Born: October 8, 1950 (age 75) Nellore, Madras State (now in Andhra Pradesh), India
- Party: Democratic
- Spouse: Lucrecia Dayci
- Education: B.E.E. Guindy Engineering College (Electrical Engineering); M.E.E. City College of New York (Electrical Engineering)
- Occupation: Engineer

Upendra Chivukula (born October 8, 1950) is an Indian-American Democratic politician currently serving on the New Jersey Board of Public Utilities, who previously represented New Jersey's 17th legislative district in the General Assembly from 2002 to 2014. He was the first Indian American elected to the New Jersey legislature and the fourth Indian American elected to state office anywhere in the United States. During his time in office, he was regarded as a progressive.

After immigrating to the United States from India, Chivukula served on the Franklin Township council from 1998 to 2005. In 2000, he served as mayor of Franklin. In 2001, he was elected to the New Jersey General Assembly, representing the 17th district. He was re-elected to six subsequent terms, rising to the position of deputy speaker from 2007 until his resignation in 2014.

Chivukula has run twice for the United States House of Representatives. In 2012, he was the Democratic nominee for New Jersey's 7th district but was defeated by incumbent Leonard Lance. In 2014, he ran instead for the open seat in New Jersey's 12th district which had been vacated by Rush Holt Jr. He finished third in the Democratic primary. After his defeat, he was appointed to the New Jersey Board of Public Utilities by Chris Christie and was sworn in on September 30, 2014.

== Early life ==
Upendra Chivukula was born on October 8, 1950 in Nellore, India.

In 1972, Chivukula received a bachelor of electrical engineering degree from College of Engineering, Guindy in Chennai (now part of Anna University). He received a master of engineering degree from City College of New York in 1976.

== Political career ==
Before running for public office, Chivukula was appointed by Governor of New Jersey James Florio to the New Jersey State Board of Social Work Examiners. He served on that body as a public member from 1994 to 1997.

=== Franklin Township ===
In 1997, Chivukula was elected to represent the Fifth Ward on the Franklin Township Council. He was re-elected to a second term in 2001.

In 1998, he served as deputy mayor of the township. He served as mayor in 2000.

In Franklin Township, he has also served on the Franklin Township Community Foundation, Finance Oversight Committee, Traffic Management Committee, Fire Prevention Board, Emergency Life Support Delivery, Integrated Communications Committee, Emergency Management, Franklin Township Planning Board, Economic Development Committee, Community / Senior Center Steering Committee and the Bicentennial Celebration Committee. Chivukula has served on the Somerset County Affordable Housing Board of Trustees and the Middlesex County Cultural and Historic Commission.

=== New Jersey General Assembly ===
In 2001, Chivukula was elected to a two-year term in the New Jersey General Assembly. He was re-elected in 2003, 2005, 2007, 2009, 2011, and 2013.

Chivukula served as the New Jersey General Assembly's deputy speaker from 2007 to 2014. Chivukula was noted for being a progressive legislator and, in coordination with Congressman Rush D. Holt Jr., pushed through reforms to invest in clean energy, infrastructure projects, and high-tech manufacturing jobs.

He was a delegate to the Democratic National Convention in 1996, 2000, 2008, and 2012 and was an alternate delegate in 2004.

Chivukula was one of New Jersey's presidential electors casting the state's Electoral College votes after the 2004 presidential election; New Jersey's electors cast their ballots on December 13, 2004, in the State House Annex in Trenton, where all 15 votes were cast for Democratic Party candidate John Kerry.

=== 2012 and 2014 congressional campaigns ===
In 2012, Chivukula ran for United States House of Representatives against Republican incumbent Leonard Lance in New Jersey's 7th congressional district. He was defeated in the heavily Republican district by a vote of 175,662 to 123,057.

In 2014, Chivukula ran for the House again, standing for the open seat created by Rush Holt Jr.'s retirement. He finished second behind assemblywoman Bonnie Watson Coleman and state senator Linda R. Greenstein.

=== Board of Public Utilities ===
On September 18, 2014, Chivukula was nominated by Governor Chris Christie to a seat on the New Jersey Board of Public Utilities, to replace retiring commissioner Jeanne Fox. The New Jersey Senate voted 35–1 to confirm Chivukula to a six-year term on the New Jersey Board of Public Utilities on September 22, and he was sworn in on September 30.

In 2015, Chivukula co-authored "The 3rd Way" with Veny Musum. The authors advocate for closing the broadening gap between the rich and the poor in America and worldwide through inclusive capitalism or economic democracy, via business initiatives such as increasing employee equity stakes and employee profit sharing.

== Election history ==
2014 U.S. House of Representatives 12th Congressional District Democratic Primary election
Party	Candidate	Votes	%
Democratic	Bonnie Watson Coleman	15,603	43.04
Democratic	Linda R. Greenstein	10,089	27.83
Democratic	Upendra J. Chivukula	7,890	21.77
Democratic	Andrew Zwicker	2,668	7.36
Democratic hold			

New Jersey General Assembly elections, 2013
Party	Candidate	Votes	%
Democratic	Joseph V. Egan (incumbent)	23,763	32.5
Democratic	Upendra J. Chivukula (incumbent)	23,331	31.9
Republican	Carlo DiLalla	13,762	18.8
Republican	Sanjay Patel	12,281	16.8
Democratic hold			

2012 U.S. House of Representatives 7th Congressional District election
Party	Candidate	Votes	%
Republican	Leonard Lance (incumbent)	175,662	57.16
Democratic	Upendra J. Chivukula	123,057	40.04
Independent	Dennis A. Breen	4,518	1.47
Libertarian	Patrick McKnight	4,078	1.33
Republican hold			

New Jersey General Assembly elections, 2011
Party	Candidate	Votes	%
Democratic	Joseph V. Egan (incumbent)	15,165	31.9
Democratic	Upendra J. Chivukula (incumbent)	14,862	31.3
Republican	Robert S. Mettler	8,876	18.7
Republican	Carlo A. DiLalla	8,627	18.2
Democratic hold			

New Jersey General Assembly elections, 2009
Party	Candidate	Votes	%
Democratic	Joseph V. Egan (incumbent)	29,876	32.4
Democratic	Upendra J. Chivukula (incumbent)	28,030	30.4
Republican	Anthony Mazzola	18,023	19.5
Republican	Salim A. Nathoo	16,419	17.8
Democratic hold			

New Jersey General Assembly elections, 2007
Party	Candidate	Votes	%
Democratic	Joseph V. Egan (incumbent)	16,456	31.2
Democratic	Upendra J. Chivukula (incumbent)	15,765	29.9
Republican	Matthew "Skip" House	10,324	19.6
Republican	Leonard Messineo	10,257	19.4
Democratic hold			

New Jersey General Assembly elections, 2005
Party	Candidate	Votes	%
Democratic	Joseph V. Egan (incumbent)	29,601	34.0
Democratic	Upendra J. Chivukula (incumbent)	28,239	32.4
Republican	Catherine J. Barrier	15,748	18.1
Republican	Salim A. Nathoo	13,507	15.5
Democratic hold			

New Jersey General Assembly elections, 2003
Party	Candidate	Votes	%
Democratic	Joseph V. Egan (incumbent)	16,143	28.8
Democratic	Upendra J. Chivukula (incumbent)	15,956	28.5
Republican	Catherine J. Barrier	10,988	19.6
Republican	Scott Johnkins	10,206	18.2
Democratic hold			

New Jersey General Assembly elections, 2001
Party	Candidate	Votes	%
Democratic	Joseph V. Egan	27,948	33.9
Democratic	Upendra J. Chivukula	26,374	31.9
Republican	Catherine J. Barrier	14,161	17.2
Republican	Anthony Mazzola	14,085	17.1
Democratic hold			

Franklin Township Council 5th Ward election, 2001
Party	Candidate	Votes	%
Democratic	Upendra J. Chivukula (incumbent)	1,332	64.6
Republican	Ormsby	731	35.4
Democratic hold			

Franklin Township Council 5th Ward election, 1997
Party	Candidate	Votes	%
Democratic	Upendra J. Chivukula	1,403	60.1
Republican	Patricia K. Daniel	899	39.9
Democratic hold			

== Personal life ==
As of 2007, he was a Hindu and lived in Somerset, New Jersey. He was married to Lucrecia Dayci, and they had two children.

== See also ==
- Indian Americans in New Jersey
