= David C. Schwartz =

American politician (1939–2022)

Member of the New Jersey General Assembly from the 17th district
- In office January 10, 1978 – January 14, 1992
- Preceded by: William J. Hamilton
- Succeeded by: Jerry Green

Personal details
- Born: February 27, 1939 New York City, U.S.
- Died: June 10, 2022 (aged 83)
- Party: Democratic

David C. Schwartz (February 27, 1939 – June 10, 2022) was an American politician who served in the New Jersey General Assembly from the 17th Legislative District from 1978 to 1992.

He died on June 10, 2022, at the age of 83.
