= Alene S. Ammond =

American politician (1933–2019)

Alene Susan Ammond

Member of the New Jersey Senate from the 6th district
- In office January 8, 1974 – January 10, 1978
- Preceded by: John L. Miller
- Succeeded by: Lee B. Laskin

Personal details
- Born: April 6, 1933 New York City, New York
- Died: June 4, 2019 (aged 86) Burlington, Vermont
- Party: Democratic, later Republican
- Spouse: Harold J. Ammond
- Children: 2
- Education: Pace College; Hunter College

Alene S. Ammond (April 6, 1933 – June 4, 2019) was an American housewife, activist, and politician who represented parts of Camden County, New Jersey in the New Jersey Senate from 1974 to 1978. She became known as an outspoken and unstoppable advocate for the public interest and public transparency, earning her the nickname "The Terror of Trenton" and opposition from her own party. She was defeated in an intraparty primary challenge in 1977.

== Early life ==
Ammond was born on April 6, 1933 in Jackson Heights, New York City. She attended Pace College and Hunter College while pursuing a career as a ballerina. She married Harold J. Ammond in 1957 and dropped out of college in order to start a family; they had two daughters and one son.

== Political career ==
In 1967, Ammond ran unsuccessfully for a seat on the Cherry Hill Township Council.

=== Cherry Hill League ===
In October 1968, with her family's urging, Ammond joined with Rosemarie Hodspoor and eleven others to form the "Cherry Hill League," a non-partisan group "dedicated to fighting city hall, examining public issues, and presenting them to the government." Ammond was motivated by her numerous failed attempts to have the public library moved to a larger location in a nicer part of the town. Ammond and Hodspoor registered as the state's first "public interest lobbyists." In that invented role, they sought to pressure legislators in Trenton through public information campaigns via newspapers and television. At the local level, they worked to reduce traffic, end a sanitation strike, abolish residency requirements for police officers, and campaign for ethics reform. In common with many other suburban activist groups of the time, the Cherry Hill League's primary focus was property tax reform following a 114 percent increase in rates from 1969 to 1970. Following a remark by the mayor that "the guys who don't pay up" were responsible for high rates, the Cherry Hill League focused on tax delinquent individuals and corporations. Within one week of Ammond publishing a list of such corporations, two-thirds of the outstanding accounts in Cherry Hill were paid in full.

From the start, Ammond received pushback from local political leadership, particularly the Camden County Democratic Party organization, where leaders told her that she "wasn't meant for politics." According to Ammond, both she and Hodspoor received slashed tires, obscene phone calls, and visits from intimidating men at their homes. These issues abated after Ammond testified to the United States Senate in May 1972 on the "uneven, erratic, and often unfair administration of the property tax," entitling her to federal law enforcement protection upon request. Ammond's testimony on New Jersey property taxes was compiled with the assistance of the Tax Reform Research Group, a think tank founded by Ralph Nader.

=== New Jersey Senate ===
In 1973, Ammond was endorsed by the Camden County Democratic chair to run for the New Jersey Senate in the newly formed 6th legislative district. She defeated John Jehr in the primary by about 500 votes out of over 8,000 cast. In the general election, she defeated Republican incumbent John L. Miller with 53 percent of the vote, carried by the strength of the reaction against the Watergate scandal and her reputation for opposing corruption.

As a senator, Ammond was vocal in opposing machine politics. For example, she used senatorial courtesy to block the appointment of a new Camden County prosecutor and clashed with Senate president Frank J. Dodd. In January 1975, she was expelled from the Democratic caucus for sharing caucus deliberations and publicly charging legislators with self-dealing. She sued in federal court, where Judge Mitchell Harry Cohen held that the expulsion violated her First Amendment rights and ordered her readmission to the caucus, to her colleagues' dismay. One senator publicly told her, "You're not part of the team," and she replied, "I have no intention of being part of your team, Senator. I don't like what it stands for. Besides, I have another team outside."

While in the Senate, she wrote a column for Family Circle Magazine based on her previous experience in public interest lobbying.

In 1977, Ammond was defeated in the Democratic primary by former Cherry Hill councilman Victor Pachter, who had the support of the party machine. Pachter went on to lose the general election to Lee Laskin.

=== Later campaigns ===
In 1980, she ran in the Democratic primary for New Jersey's 6th congressional district but placed last out of three candidates.

In 1993, Ammond ran as a third-party candidate for Governor of New Jersey under the slogan "For the People." She placed eighth out of 19 candidates, receiving 0.13 percent of the vote.

In 2002, she ran as the Republican nominee for mayor of Cherry Hill but was defeated by Bernie Platt.

== Later life and death ==
Ammond later moved to Voorhees Township, New Jersey. She died June 4, 2019, at the University of Vermont Medical Center from complications of pneumonia.
