= John A. Lynch Sr. =

American politician (1908–1978)

President of the New Jersey Senate
- In office 1966
- Preceded by: Charles W. Sandman
- Succeeded by: Sido L. Ridolfi

Member of the New Jersey Senate
- In office 1956 – March 3, 1978
- Preceded by: Bernard W. Vogel
- Succeeded by: William J. Hamilton
- Constituency: Middlesex (1956–1966); District 7 (1966–74); 17th district (1974–78)

Mayor of New Brunswick
- In office 1951–1955
- Preceded by: Chester W. Paulus
- Succeeded by: Chester W. Paulus

Personal details
- Born: March 10, 1908 New Brunswick, New Jersey, U.S.
- Died: March 3, 1978 (aged 69) Queens, New York City, New York, U.S.
- Political party: Democratic

John A. Lynch Sr. (March 10, 1908 – March 3, 1978) was an American politician of the Democratic Party who served in the New Jersey Senate for 22 years, where he represented the 17th legislative District, and as mayor of New Brunswick, New Jersey from 1951 to 1955.

== Biography ==
Lynch was born in New Brunswick, New Jersey, on March 10, 1908, to John T. Lynch and Margaret Corrigan. After graduating from St. Peter the Apostle High School in New Brunswick in 1925, he entered Fordham University. He transferred to Fordham University School of Law, graduating in 1929 with a Bachelor of Laws degree. He was admitted to the New Jersey bar in October 1929. He clerked with New Jersey Supreme Court Justice Peter F. Daly and became a trial lawyer in New Brunswick.

On October 13, 1934, Lynch married Evelyn Rooney, daughter of Joseph Rooney and Helen Ware. They had five children: Barbara Ann, John Jr., William J., Mary-Lynn, and Gerald M. Lynch. John A. Lynch Jr. would also serve as State Senator and Mayor of New Brunswick.

From 1935 to 1941 he served as police recorder of the city of New Brunswick. He then served as prosecutor of pleas for Middlesex County from 1941 to 1946. In 1946 he was elected to the New Brunswick Board of Commissioners, and then became mayor in 1951, serving until 1955.

In 1955 he was elected to the first of seven terms to the New Jersey Senate. In 1966 he was selected as Senate President, serving as Acting Governor in the absence of Governor Richard J. Hughes.

Lynch continued to serve in the Senate while suffering from cancer in the last four years of his life. He died at Whitestone Hospital in Queens, New York City, on March 3, 1978, a week before his 70th birthday.

== Legacy ==
The John A. Lynch Sr. Memorial Bridge, spanning the Raritan River on Route 18, is named in his honor.

Political offices
Preceded by Charles W. Sandman	President of the New Jersey Senate; 1966	Succeeded by Sido L. Ridolfi
Preceded by Chester W. Paulus	Mayor of New Brunswick, New Jersey; 1951–1955	Succeeded by Chester W. Paulus
