= New Jersey Board of Public Utilities =

Regulatory authority in New Jersey "with authority to oversee the regulated utilities"

State of New Jersey Board of Public Utilities

Agency overview
- Preceding agency: Board of Regulatory Commissioners
- Jurisdiction: New Jersey
- Headquarters: 44 S. Clinton Avenue, Trenton, NJ 08625
- Employees: 278
- Agency executive: Christine Guhl-Sadovy, President
- Parent agency: New Jersey Department of the Treasury
- Website: www.state.nj.us/bpu/

The New Jersey Board of Public Utilities (NJBPU) is a regulatory authority in New Jersey "with authority to oversee the regulated utilities, which in turn provide critical services such as natural gas, electricity, water, telecommunications and cable television. The law requires the Board to ensure safe, adequate, and proper utility services at reasonable rates for customers." NJBPU regulates natural gas, electricity, water, telecommunications and cable television services. NJBPU's five-member Board addresses issues of consumer protection, energy reform, deregulation of energy and telecommunications services and the restructuring of utility rates to encourage energy conservation and competitive pricing in the industry. NJBPU monitors utility service and responds to consumer complaints.

The Board of Public Utilities administers incentive programs that support the development of solar power in New Jersey and offshore wind power in New Jersey.

== History ==
NJBPU traces its roots back to 1910, with the formation of the Board of Public Utility Commissioners, which then covered gas, electricity, water and communications, as well as railroads and interstate commerce. In 1977, what was then the Department of Public Utilities was reorganized as the Department of Energy. The Department of Energy was abolished in 1988. In 1991 the energy responsibilities were moved the Department of Environmental Protection and Energy and renamed as the Board of Regulatory Commissioners. In 1994, the agency was renamed back to the Board of Public Utilities and placed in its current position within the New Jersey Department of the Treasury.

Commissioners are appointed to six-year terms and traditionally with partisan balance with no more than three members of the same party. The governor also selects one commissioner to serve as president and in the governor's cabinet. Commissioner Christine Guhl-Sadovy (since June 2023) was named the President of the New Jersey Board of Public Utilities after the death of Joseph L. Fiordaliso in September 2023. The other four commissioners are Zenon Christodoulou (since August 2022), Marian Abdou (since June 2023), Michael Bange (since January 2024), and a vacant seat (since September 2023).

Past commissioners include Joseph L. Fiordaliso (2006–2023, president 2018–2023), Barbara A. Curran (1980–1988, president 1982–1988), Upendra J. Chivukula (2014–2022), Richard Mroz (president 2014–2018), Nicholas Asselta (2008–2012), Jeanne Fox (2002–2014), Robert M. Hanna (2011–2014), Lee Solomon (2010–2011), Dianne Solomon (2013–2023, president 2014), Robert M. Gordon (2018-2023), and Mary-Anna Holden (2012–2023).
