= 1985 New Jersey General Assembly election =

- November 5, 1985

All 80 seats in the New Jersey General Assembly 41 seats needed for a majority
- Turnout: 52% (▲4pp)
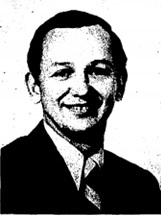

	Majority party	Minority party
Leader	Chuck Hardwick	Alan Karcher (stepped down)
Party	Republican	Democratic
Leader since	January 3, 1985	January 12, 1982
Leader's seat	21st (Westfield)	19th (New Brunswick)
Seats before	36	44
Seats won	50	30
Seat change	▲14	▼14
- Results: Republican gain Democratic gain Republican hold Democratic hold
Speaker before election
Alan Karcher
Democratic
Elected Speaker
Chuck Hardwick
Republican

The 1985 New Jersey General Assembly election was held on November 5, 1985.

The elections coincided with Governor Tom Kean's landslide re-election. The result was a historic victory for Kean's Republican Party, which gained 14 seats to retake the majority in the Assembly. As of 2026, this remains the only election since 1973 in which Republicans won any seats in the Senate or Assembly from Hudson County, where they carried four of six seats.

Republicans flipped one seat in districts 9, 10, and 14, as well as both seats in districts 3, 13, 30, 32, 33, and 36. Democrats flipped one seat in District 17.

== Incumbents not running for re-election ==
=== Democratic ===
- Thomas W. Long (District 20)
- Nicholas LaRocca (District 33)

== Summary of races ==
Voters in each legislative district elect two members to the New Jersey General Assembly.

District	Incumbent	Party	Elected	Party
1st Legislative District	Guy F. Muziani	Rep	Guy F. Muziani	Rep
1st Legislative District	Joseph W. Chinnici	Rep	Joseph W. Chinnici	Rep
2nd Legislative District	J. Edward Cline	Rep	J. Edward Cline	Rep
2nd Legislative District	Dolores G. Cooper	Rep	Dolores G. Cooper	Rep
3rd Legislative District	Martin A. Herman	Dem	Jack Collins	Rep
3rd Legislative District	Thomas A. Pankok	Dem	Gary Stuhltrager	Rep
4th Legislative District	Anthony S. Marsella	Dem	Anthony S. Marsella	Dem
4th Legislative District	Dennis L. Riley	Dem	Dennis L. Riley	Dem
5th Legislative District	Francis J. Gorman	Dem	Francis J. Gorman	Dem
5th Legislative District	Wayne R. Bryant	Dem	Wayne R. Bryant	Dem
6th Legislative District	John A. Rocco	Rep	John A. Rocco	Rep
6th Legislative District	Thomas J. Shusted	Rep	Thomas J. Shusted	Rep
7th Legislative District	Barbara Kalik	Dem	Barbara Kalik	Dem
7th Legislative District	Thomas P. Foy	Dem	Thomas P. Foy	Dem
8th Legislative District	Harold L. Colburn Jr. (Note: Colburn won a September 1984 special to complete the unexpired term of Assemblyman Robert J. Meyer, who died of a heart attack.)	Rep	Harold L. Colburn Jr.	Rep
8th Legislative District	Robert C. Shinn Jr. (Note: Shinn won a special election in February 1985 to complete the unexpired term of Assemblyman C. William Haines, who had been elevated to the Senate.)	Rep	Robert C. Shinn	Rep
9th Legislative District	John T. Hendrickson Jr.	Rep	John T. Hendrickson Jr.	Rep
9th Legislative District	Jorge A. Rod	Dem (Note: Rod was elected as a Republican in 1983, but switched parties on August 27, shortly before the election.)	Jeffrey Moran	Rep
10th Legislative District	John Paul Doyle	Dem	John Paul Doyle	Dem
10th Legislative District	Marlene Lynch Ford	Dem	Robert Singer	Rep
11th Legislative District	Joseph A. Palaia	Rep	Joseph A. Palaia	Rep
11th Legislative District	Anthony M. Villane	Rep	Anthony M. Villane	Rep
12th Legislative District	Marie Sheehan Muhler	Rep	Marie Sheehan Muhler	Rep
12th Legislative District	John O. Bennett	Rep	John O. Bennett	Rep
13th Legislative District	Jacqueline Walker	Dem	Joseph Azzolina	Rep
13th Legislative District	Bill Flynn	Dem	Joann H. Smith	Rep
14th Legislative District	Joseph L. Bocchini Jr.	Dem	Joseph L. Bocchini Jr.	Dem
14th Legislative District	Joseph D. Patero	Dem	John K. Rafferty	Rep
15th Legislative District	John S. Watson	Dem	John S. Watson	Dem
15th Legislative District	Gerald S. Naples	Dem	Gerald S. Naples	Dem
16th Legislative District	Walter J. Kavanaugh	Rep	Walter J. Kavanaugh	Rep
16th Legislative District	John S. Penn	Rep	John S. Penn	Rep
17th Legislative District	David C. Schwartz	Dem	David C. Schwartz	Dem
17th Legislative District	Angela L. Perun	Rep (Note: Perun switched parties on March 14.)	Bob Smith	Dem
18th Legislative District	Thomas H. Paterniti	Dem	Thomas H. Paterniti	Dem
18th Legislative District	Frank M. Pelly	Dem	Frank M. Pelly	Dem
19th Legislative District	George Otlowski	Dem	George J. Otlowski	Dem
19th Legislative District	Alan Karcher	Dem	Alan Karcher	Dem
20th Legislative District	Thomas J. Deverin	Dem	Thomas J. Deverin	Dem
20th Legislative District	Thomas W. Long	Dem	George Hudak	Dem
21st Legislative District	Chuck Hardwick	Rep	Chuck Hardwick	Rep
21st Legislative District	Peter J. Genova (Note: Genova won a March 1985 special election to complete the unexpired term of Assemblyman Edward K. Gill, who died of heart disease.)	Rep	Peter J. Genova	Rep
22nd Legislative District	Bob Franks	Rep	Bob Franks	Rep
22nd Legislative District	Maureen Ogden	Rep	Maureen Ogden	Rep
23rd Legislative District	Dick Zimmer	Rep	Dick Zimmer	Rep
23rd Legislative District	Karl Weidel	Rep	Karl Weidel	Rep
24th Legislative District	Robert E. Littell	Rep	Robert E. Littell	Rep
24th Legislative District	Chuck Haytaian	Rep	Chuck Haytaian	Rep
25th Legislative District	Rodney Frelinghuysen	Rep	Rodney Frelinghuysen	Rep
25th Legislative District	Arthur R. Albohn	Rep	Arthur R. Albohn	Rep
26th Legislative District	Robert J. Martin (Note: Martin won a January 1985 special election to complete the unexpired term of Assemblyman Dean Gallo, who resigned to join the U.S. House of Representatives.)	Rep	Robert J. Martin	Rep
26th Legislative District	Ralph A. Loveys	Rep	Ralph A. Loveys	Rep
27th Legislative District	Harry A. McEnroe	Dem	Harry A. McEnroe	Dem
27th Legislative District	Mildred Barry Garvin	Dem	Mildred Barry Garvin	Dem
28th Legislative District	Michael Adubato	Dem	Michael Adubato	Dem
28th Legislative District	James Zangari	Dem	James Zangari	Dem
29th Legislative District	Willie B. Brown	Dem	Willie B. Brown	Dem
29th Legislative District	Eugene H. Thompson	Dem	Eugene H. Thompson	Dem
30th Legislative District	Buddy Fortunato	Dem	John V. Kelly	Rep
30th Legislative District	Steve Adubato	Dem	Marion Crecco	Rep
31st Legislative District	Joe Doria	Dem	Joe Doria	Dem
31st Legislative District	Joseph Charles	Dem	Joseph Charles	Dem
32nd Legislative District	Paul Cuprowski	Dem	Frank J. Gargiulo	Rep
32nd Legislative District	Anthony P. Vainieri	Dem	Charles J. Catrillo	Rep
33rd Legislative District	Nicholas LaRocca	Dem	Ronald A. Dario	Rep
33rd Legislative District	Robert A. Ranieri	Dem	Jose Arango	Rep
34th Legislative District	Gerald Zecker	Rep	Gerald Zecker	Rep
34th Legislative District	Newton E. Miller	Rep	Newton E. Miller	Rep
35th Legislative District	John Girgenti	Dem	John Girgenti	Dem
35th Legislative District	Vincent O. Pellecchia	Dem	Vincent O. Pellecchia	Dem
36th Legislative District	Robert Hollenbeck	Dem	Kathleen Donovan	Rep
36th Legislative District	Richard Visotcky	Dem	Paul DiGaetano	Rep
37th Legislative District	D. Bennett Mazur	Dem	D. Bennett Mazur	Dem
37th Legislative District	Byron Baer	Dem	Byron Baer	Dem
38th Legislative District	Pat Schuber	Rep	Pat Schuber	Rep
38th Legislative District	Louis Kosco	Rep	Louis Kosco	Rep
39th Legislative District	John E. Rooney	Rep	John E. Rooney	Rep
39th Legislative District	Elizabeth Randall (Note: Randall won a March 1985 special election to complete the unexpired term of Assemblyman John W. Markert.)	Rep	Elizabeth Randall	Rep
40th Legislative District	Walter M. D. Kern	Rep	Walter M. D. Kern	Rep
40th Legislative District	Nicholas Felice	Rep	Nicholas R. Felice	Rep

=== Close races ===
Districts where the difference of total votes between the top-two parties was under 10%:

1. District 10, 0.2% gain R
2. District 14, 2.8% gain R
3. District 3, 3.8% gain
4. District 19, 4.0%
5. District 13, 4.0% gain
6. District 18, 5.6%
7. District 37, 7.8%
8. District 4, 8.2%
9. District 17, 8.2% gain D
10. District 30, 8.6% gain
11. District 36, 9.2% gain
12. District 32, 9.6% gain
13. District 33, 9.6% gain

== District 1 ==
=== Republican primary ===
==== Candidates ====
- Joseph W. Chinnici, incumbent Assembly member from Bridgeton since 1972 (Regular Republican Party)
- Guy F. Muziani, incumbent Assembly member from Wildwood since 1982 (Regular Republican Party)

==== Results ====
1985 Republican primary
Party	Candidate	Votes	%
Republican	Guy F. Muziani (incumbent)	8,500	50.15%
Republican	Joseph W. Chinnici (incumbent)	8,450	49.85%
Total votes		16,950	100.00%

=== Democratic primary ===
==== Candidates ====
- Peter L. Amico, forklift innovator from Vineland (Regular Democratic Organization)
- Raymond A. Batten, prosecutor (Regular Democratic Organization)

==== Results ====
1985 Democratic primary
Party	Candidate	Votes	%
Democratic	Raymond A. Batten	3,314	50.28%
Democratic	Peter L. Amico	3,277	49.72%
Total votes		6,591	100.00%

=== General election ===
==== Candidates ====
- Peter L. Amico, forklift innovator from Vineland (Democratic)
- Raymond A. Batten, prosecutor (Democratic)
- Joseph W. Chinnici, incumbent Assembly member from Bridgeton since 1972 (Republican)
- Guy F. Muziani, incumbent Assembly member from Wildwood since 1982 (Republican)

==== Results ====
1985 general election
Party	Candidate	Votes	%	±%
Republican	Joseph W. Chinnici (incumbent)	35,610	33.7	▲5.5
Republican	Guy F. Muziani (incumbent)	33,978	32.1	▲6.0
Democratic	Raymond A. Batten	18,794	17.8	▼8.0
Democratic	Peter L. Amico	17,407	16.5	▼3.4
Total votes		'105,789'	'100.0'	

== District 2 ==
=== Republican primary ===
==== Candidates ====
- Dolores G. Cooper, incumbent Assembly member from Brigantine since 1982 (Regular Republican)
- J. Edward Kline, incumbent Assembly member from Atlantic City since 1984 (Regular Republican)

==== Results ====
1985 Republican primary
Party	Candidate	Votes	%
Republican	J. Edward Kline (incumbent)	5,714	50.70%
Republican	Dolores G. Cooper (incumbent)	5,557	49.30%
Total votes		11,271	100.00%

=== Democratic primary ===
==== Candidates ====
- Lillian E. Bryant, daughter of Horace J. Bryant (Regular Democratic Organization)
- Joel Jacovitz, real estate developer (Regular Democratic Organization)
- Israel Mosee, community activist

==== Results ====
1985 Democratic primary
Party	Candidate	Votes	%
Democratic	Lillian E. Bryant	3,286	46.39%
Democratic	Joel Jacovitz	2,844	40.15%
Democratic	Israel Mosee	954	13.47%
Total votes		7,084	100.00%

=== General election ===
==== Candidates ====
- Lillian E. Bryant, daughter of Horace J. Bryant (Democratic)
- Dolores G. Cooper, incumbent Assembly member from Atlantic City since 1982 (Republican)
- Joel Jacovitz, real estate developer (Democratic)
- J. Edward Kline, incumbent Assembly member from Brigantine since 1984 (Republican)

==== Results ====
1985 general election
Party	Candidate	Votes	%	±%
Republican	J. Edward Kline (incumbent)	32,092	34.1	▲5.6
Republican	Dolores G. Cooper (incumbent)	27,395	29.1	▲2.0
Democratic	Joel Jacovitz	19,899	21.2	▼1.0
Democratic	Lillian E. Bryant	14,634	15.6	▼4.8
Total votes		'94,020'	'100.0'	

== District 3 ==
=== Democratic primary ===
==== Candidates ====
- Martin A. Herman, incumbent Assembly member from Mickleton since 1974 (Democratic)
- Thomas A. Pankok, incumbent Assembly member from Pennsville since 1982 (Democratic)

==== Results ====
1985 Democratic primary
Party	Candidate	Votes	%
Democratic	Martin A. Herman (incumbent)	6,107	50.66%
Democratic	Thomas A. Pankok (incumbent)	5,949	49.34%
Total votes		12,056	100.00%

=== Republican primary ===
==== Candidates ====
- Jack Collins, former Glassboro State College basketball coach and member of the Elmer Board of Education (Regular Republican Organization)
- Gary Stuhltrager, Gloucester County Freeholder (Regular Organization Republican)
- Douglas Zee, fruit grower and farmer (Regular Republican - the People's Choice)

==== Results ====
1985 Republican primary
Party	Candidate	Votes	%
Republican	Jack Collins	4,098	39.82%
Republican	Gary W. Stuhltrager	3,154	30.65%
Republican	Douglas Zee	3,039	29.53%
Total votes		10,291	100.00%

=== General election ===
==== Candidates ====
- Jack Collins, former Glassboro State College basketball coach and member of the Elmer Board of Education (Republican)
- Martin A. Herman, incumbent Assembly member from Mickleton since 1974 (Democratic)
- Thomas A. Pankok, incumbent Assembly member from Pennsville since 1982 (Democratic)
- Gary Stuhltrager, Gloucester County Freeholder (Republican)

==== Results ====
1985 general election
Party	Candidate	Votes	%	±%
Republican	Jack Collins	27,514	26.2	▲3.3
Republican	Gary W. Stuhltrager	27,032	25.7	▲3.5
Democratic	Martin A. Herman (incumbent)	25,699	24.5	▼3.7
Democratic	Thomas A. Pankok (incumbent)	24,796	23.6	▼3.1
Total votes		'105,041'	'100.0'	

== District 4 ==
=== General election ===
==== Candidates ====
- Anthony S. Marsella, incumbent Assembly member since 1982 (Democratic)
- Dennis L. Riley, incumbent Assembly member since 1980 (Democratic)
- Frank F. Senatore (Republican)
- William F. Thomson (Republican)

==== Results ====
1985 general election
Party	Candidate	Votes	%	±%
Democratic	Anthony S. Marsella (incumbent)	23,162	27.3	▼3.4
Democratic	Dennis L. Riley (incumbent)	22,703	26.8	▼3.4
Republican	Frank F. Senatore	19,621	23.1	▲2.8
Republican	William F. Thomson	19,307	22.8	▲3.9
Total votes		'84,793'	'100.0'	

== District 5 ==
=== General election ===
==== Candidates ====
- Charles E. Brimm (Republican)
- Wayne R. Bryant, incumbent Assembly member since 1982 (Democratic)
- Francis J. Gorman, incumbent Assembly member since 1972 (Democratic)
- William M. Terrell (Republican)

==== Results ====
1985 general election
Party	Candidate	Votes	%	±%
Democratic	Francis J. Gorman (incumbent)	22,828	30.9	▼2.8
Democratic	Wayne R. Bryant (incumbent)	22,691	30.7	▼3.6
Republican	Charles E. Brimm	14,514	19.6	▲3.3
Republican	William M. Terrell	13,872	18.8	▲3.2
Total votes		'73,905'	'100.0'	

== District 6 ==
=== General election ===
==== Candidates ====
- Harry Benn (Democratic)
- John A. Rocco, incumbent Assembly member since 1980 (Republican)
- Thomas J. Shusted, incumbent Assembly member since 1978 (Note: Shusted previously served in the Assembly from 1970 to 1971.) (Republican)
- Carl B. Viniar (Democratic)

==== Results ====
1985 general election
Party	Candidate	Votes	%	±%
Republican	John A. Rocco (incumbent)	32,812	32.7	▲4.9
Republican	Thomas J. Shusted (incumbent)	31,679	31.6	▲3.9
Democratic	Carl B. Viniar	18,425	18.4	▼4.8
Democratic	Harry Benn	17,382	17.3	▼4.0
Total votes		'100,298'	'100.0'	

== District 7 ==
=== General election ===
==== Candidates ====
- Charles J. Ansert (Republican)
- Renee L. Borstad (Republican)
- Thomas P. Foy, incumbent Assembly member since 1980 (Democratic)
- Barbara Kalik, incumbent Assembly member since 1978 (Democratic)

==== Results ====
1985 general election
Party	Candidate	Votes	%	±%
Democratic	Barbara Faith Kalik (incumbent)	26,452	29.4	▼1.3
Democratic	Thomas P. Foy (incumbent)	25,217	28.0	▼1.8
Republican	Renee L. Borstad	19,318	21.4	▲0.3
Republican	Charles J. Ansert	19,096	21.2	▲2.9
Total votes		'90,083'	'100.0'	

== District 8 ==
=== General election ===
==== Candidates ====
- Claire B. Cohen (Democratic)
- Harold L. Colburn Jr., incumbent Assembly member since 1984 (Republican)
- Bernardo S. Doganiero, perennial candidate (Socialist Labor)
- Paul Ferguson (Socialist Labor)
- Robert C. Shinn Jr., incumbent Assembly member since February 1985 (Republican)
- Harrison B. Slack (Democratic)

==== Results ====
1985 general election
Party	Candidate	Votes	%	±%
Republican	Harold L. Colburn Jr. (incumbent)	29,150	34.8	▲3.8
Republican	Robert C. Shinn Jr. (incumbent)	29,085	34.7	▲3.2
Democratic	Claire B. Cohen	12,971	15.5	▼3.6
Democratic	Harrison B. Slack	12,285	14.7	▼3.7
Socialist Labor	Bernardo S. Doganiero	189	0.2	N/A
Socialist Labor	Paul Ferguson	170	0.2	N/A
Total votes		'83,850'	'100.0'	

== District 9 ==
=== General election ===
==== Candidates ====
- Paul David Hedrich ("Time for Change")
- John T. Hendrickson Jr., incumbent Assembly member since 1982 (Republican)
- Warren E. Hickman (Democratic)
- Jeffrey Moran, member of the Ocean County Utilities Authority and former member of the Beachwood Borough Council (Republican)
- Jorge A. Rod, incumbent Assembly member since 1982 (Democratic)

==== Results ====
1985 general election
Party	Candidate	Votes	%	±%
Republican	John T. Hendrickson Jr. (incumbent)	39,031	32.4	▲0.9
Republican	Jeffrey Moran	37,877	31.4	▲1.2
Democratic	Jorge A. Rod (incumbent)	23,470	19.5	▲0.4 (▼10.7)
Democratic	Warren E. Hickman	19,420	16.1	▼2.2
"Time for Change"	Paul David Hedrich	708	0.6	N/A
Total votes		'120,506'	'100.0'	

== District 10 ==
=== General election ===
==== Candidates ====
- John Paul Doyle, incumbent Assembly member since 1974 and Assembly Majority Leader since 1982 (Democratic)
- Marlene Lynch Ford, incumbent Assembly member since 1984 (Democratic)
- Wallace Gluck (Libertarian)
- Roden S. Lightbody (Republican)
- Robert Singer, mayor of Lakewood Township (Republican)

==== Results ====
1985 general election
Party	Candidate	Votes	%	±%
Democratic	John Paul Doyle (incumbent)	30,055	25.9	▼3.3
Republican	Robert Singer	29,621	25.5	▲1.9
Republican	Roden S. Lightbody	28,179	24.2	▲3.5
Democratic	Marlene Lynch Ford (incumbent)	28,159	24.2	▼1.5
Libertarian	Wallace Gluck	217	0.2	N/A
Total votes		'116,231'	'100.0'	

== District 11 ==
=== General election ===
==== Candidates ====
- Craig Alan Frankel (Democratic)
- Daniel P. Jacobson, member of the Ocean Township Council (Democratic)
- Joseph A. Palaia, incumbent Assembly member since 1982 (Republican)
- Anthony M. Villane, incumbent Assembly member since 1976 (Republican)

==== Results ====
1985 general election
Party	Candidate	Votes	%	±%
Republican	Joseph A. Palaia (incumbent)	35,629	34.4	▲5.1
Republican	Anthony M. “Doc” Villane (incumbent)	35,291	34.1	▲4.9
Democratic	Craig Alan Frankel	16,298	15.8	▼5.0
Democratic	Daniel P. Jacobson	16,242	15.7	▼5.1
Total votes		'103,460'	'100.0'	

== District 12 ==
=== General election ===
==== Candidates ====
- John O. Bennett, incumbent Assembly member since 1980 (Republican)
- Michael L. Detzky (Democratic)
- Donald M. Lomurro (Democratic)
- Marie Sheehan Muhler, incumbent Assembly member since 1976 (Republican)

==== Results ====
1985 general election
Party	Candidate	Votes	%	±%
Republican	John O. Bennett (incumbent)	33,205	32.5	▲2.6
Republican	Marie Sheehan Muhler (incumbent)	32,346	31.6	▲2.0
Democratic	Donald M. Lomurro	18,584	18.2	▼2.3
Democratic	Michael L. Detzky	18,129	17.7	▼2.3
Total votes		'102,264'	'100.0'	

== District 13 ==
=== General election ===
==== Candidates ====
- Joseph Azzolina, former member of the New Jersey Senate and Assembly (Republican)
- William Flynn, incumbent Assembly member since 1974 (Democratic)
- Joann H. Smith, former member of the Old Bridge Township Council (Republican)
- Jacqueline Walker, incumbent Assembly member since 1984 (Democratic)

==== Results ====
1985 general election
Party	Candidate	Votes	%	±%
Republican	Joseph Azzolina	26,565	26.3	▲2.5
Republican	Joann H. Smith	25,970	25.7	▲4.1
Democratic	William E. Flynn (incumbent)	24,418	24.2	▼3.6
Democratic	Jacqueline Walker (incumbent)	24,058	23.8	▼3.0
Total votes		'101,011'	'100.0'	

== District 14 ==
=== General election ===
==== Candidates ====
- Joseph L. Bocchini Jr., incumbent Assembly member since 1982 (Democratic)
- Thomas Colitsas, West Windsor accountant and candidate for State Senate in 1981 (Republican)
- Joseph D. Patero, incumbent Assembly member since 1974 (Democratic)
- John K. Rafferty, mayor of Hamilton Township and candidate for Governor in 1981 (Republican)

==== Results ====
1985 general election
Party	Candidate	Votes	%	±%
Democratic	Joseph L. Bocchini, Jr. (incumbent)	28,476	26.5	▼2.0
Republican	John K. Rafferty	27,960	26.1	▲3.8
Democratic	Joseph D. Patero (incumbent)	26,707	24.9	▼3.2
Republican	Thomas Colitsas	24,189	22.5	▲1.4
Total votes		'107,332'	'100.0'	

== District 15 ==
=== General election ===
==== Candidates ====
- Barbara Marrow (Republican)
- Mary Ann McKee (Republican)
- Gerald S. Naples, incumbent Assembly member since 1982 (Democratic)
- John S. Watson, incumbent Assembly member since 1982 (Democratic)

==== Results ====
1985 general election
Party	Candidate	Votes	%	±%
Democratic	John S. Watson (incumbent)	25,173	28.2	▼3.0
Democratic	Gerald S. Naples (incumbent)	24,893	27.9	▼3.0
Republican	Barbara Marrow	19,818	22.2	▲3.0
Republican	Mary Ann McKee	19,413	21.7	▲3.0
Total votes		'89,297'	'100.0'	

== District 16 ==
=== General election ===
==== Candidates ====
- Stephen Friedlander (Libertarian)
- Walter J. Kavanaugh, incumbent Assembly member since 1976 (Republican)
- William R. Norris II (Democratic)
- John S. Penn, incumbent Assembly member since 1984 (Republican)
- Frank M. Reskin (Democratic)

==== Results ====
1985 general election
Party	Candidate	Votes	%	±%
Republican	Walter J. Kavanaugh (incumbent)	37,577	38.9	▲4.5
Republican	John S. Penn (incumbent)	35,258	36.5	▲5.5
Democratic	William R. Norris II	11,884	12.3	▼4.8
Democratic	Frank M. Reskin	11,596	12.0	▼4.3
Libertarian	Stephen Friedlander	363	0.4	▼0.8
Total votes		'96,678'	'100.0'	

== District 17 ==
=== General election ===
1985 general election
Party	Candidate	Votes	%	±%
Democratic	David C. Schwartz (incumbent)	21,174	28.1	▼4.4
Democratic	Bob Smith	19,556	26.0	▼6.1
Republican	Angela L. Perun (incumbent)	19,104	25.4	▲7.4 (▼6.7)
Republican	Francis J. Coury	15,503	20.6	▲4.1
Total votes		'75,337'	'100.0'	

== District 18 ==
=== General election ===
==== Candidates ====
- Michael Liebowitz (Republican)
- S. Elliott Mayo (Republican)
- Thomas H. Paterniti, incumbent Assembly member since 1980 (Democratic)
- Frank M. Pelly, incumbent Assembly member since 1982 (Democratic)

==== Results ====
1985 general election
Party	Candidate	Votes	%	±%
Democratic	Thomas H. Paterniti (incumbent)	30,169	26.7	▼1.8
Democratic	Frank M. Pelly (incumbent)	29,490	26.1	▼2.2
Republican	S. Elliott Mayo	27,101	24.0	▲2.1
Republican	Michael Leibowitz	26,280	23.2	▲1.9
Total votes		113,040	100.0	

== District 19 ==
=== General election ===
==== Candidates ====
- Robert De Santis (Republican)
- Alan Karcher, Speaker of the General Assembly since 1982 and incumbent Assembly member since 1974 (Democratic)
- George Otlowski, incumbent Assembly member since 1974 and mayor of Perth Amboy (Democratic)
- Emery Z. Toth (Republican)

==== Results ====
1985 general election
Party	Candidate	Votes	%	±%
Democratic	George J. Otlowski (incumbent)	26,187	26.7	▼3.3
Democratic	Alan J. Karcher (incumbent)	24,803	25.3	▼2.8
Republican	Emery Z. Toth	23,673	24.1	▲2.8
Republican	Robert De Santis	23,544	24.0	▲3.4
Total votes		'98,207'	'100.0'	

== District 20 ==
=== General election ===
==== Candidates ====
- Tom Dunn, mayor of Elizabeth and former member of the State Senate (Experienced-Competent-Courageous)
- Thomas J. Deverin, incumbent Assembly member since 1970 (Democratic)
- George Hudak, mayor of Linden (Democratic)
- Alice Holzapfel (Republican)
- Michael A. Posnock (Republican)
- Rose Zeidwerg Monyek, perennial candidate ("Inflation Fighting Housewife")

==== Results ====
1985 general election
Party	Candidate	Votes	%	±%
Democratic	Thomas J. Deverin (incumbent)	19,892	25.5	▼9.4
Democratic	George Hudak	18,085	23.1	▼11.7
Republican	Michael A. Posnock	14,617	18.7	▲3.3
Republican	Alice A. Holzapfel	13,134	16.8	▲1.8
Experienced-Competent-Courageous	Tom Dunn	10,174	13.0	N/A
"Inflation Fighting Housewife"	Rose Zeidwerg Monyek	2,240	2.9	N/A
Total votes		'78,142'	'100.0'	

== District 21 ==
=== General election ===
==== Candidates ====
- Peter J. Genova, incumbent Assembly member since February 1985 (Republican)
- Chuck Hardwick, Assembly Minority Leader and incumbent Assembly member since 1978 (Republican)
- Livio Mancino (Democratic)
- Fred Palensar III (Independent)
- Andrew Ruotolo, former Assistant United States Attorney for the District of New Jersey (Democratic)

==== Results ====
1985 general election
Party	Candidate	Votes	%	±%
Republican	Chuck Hardwick (incumbent)	36,474	32.9	▲5.9
Republican	Peter J. Genova (incumbent)	34,625	31.2	▲5.2
Democratic	Andrew K. Ruotolo, Jr.	20,526	18.5	▼5.3
Democratic	Livio Mancino	18,408	16.6	▼6.6
Independent	Fred Palensar III	818	0.7	N/A
Total votes		'110,851'	'100.0'	

== District 22 ==
=== General election ===
==== Candidates ====
- Bob Franks, incumbent Assembly member since 1980 (Republican)
- Florence Martone (Democratic)
- Maureen Ogden, incumbent Assembly member since 1982 (Republican)
- John F. Tully Jr. (Democratic)

==== Results ====
1985 general election
Party	Candidate	Votes	%	±%
Republican	Maureen Ogden (incumbent)	39,939	36.1	▲2.4
Republican	Bob Franks (incumbent)	39,284	35.5	▲2.4
Democratic	John F. Tully, Jr.	15,729	14.2	▼2.6
Democratic	Florence Martone	15,650	14.1	▼2.2
Total votes		'110,602'	'100.0'	

== District 23 ==
=== General election ===
==== Candidates ====
- Richard C. Allen (Democratic)
- Karl Weidel, incumbent Assembly member since 1970 (Republican)
- Dick Zimmer, incumbent Assembly member since 1982 (Republican)

==== Results ====
1985 general election
Party	Candidate	Votes	%	±%
Republican	Richard A. Zimmer (incumbent)	34,051	44.0	▲9.4
Republican	Karl Weidel (incumbent)	32,587	42.1	▲7.8
Democratic	Richard C. Allen	10,774	13.9	▼3.3
Total votes		'77,412'	'100.0'	

== District 24 ==
=== General election ===
==== Candidates ====
- Robert T. Davis (Democratic)
- Chuck Haytaian, incumbent Assembly member since 1982 (Republican)
- John P. Kilroy Jr. (Democratic)
- Robert E. Littell, incumbent Assembly member since 1968 (Republican)

==== Results ====
1985 general election
Party	Candidate	Votes	%	±%
Republican	Robert E. Littell (incumbent)	30,616	37.3	▲1.3
Republican	Garabed “Chuck” Haytaian (incumbent)	29,094	35.4	▲0.7
Democratic	Robert T. Davis	12,806	15.6	▲0.4
Democratic	John P. Kilroy, Jr.	9,617	11.7	▼2.3
Total votes		'82,133'	'100.0'	

== District 25 ==
=== General election ===
==== Candidates ====
- Arthur R. Albohn, incumbent Assembly member since 1980 (Republican)
- Donald Cresitello, former mayor of Morristown (Democratic)
- Rodney Frelinghuysen, incumbent Assembly member since 1984 (Republican)
- Carl A. Mottey (Democratic)

==== Results ====
1985 general election
Party	Candidate	Votes	%	±%
Republican	Rodney P. Frelinghuysen (incumbent)	31,695	37.1	▲5.4
Republican	Arthur R. Albohn (incumbent)	29,043	34.0	▲4.6
Democratic	Donald Cresitello	12,652	14.8	▼4.9
Democratic	Carl A. Mottey	11,955	14.0	▼5.2
Total votes		85,345	100.0	

== District 26 ==
=== General election ===
==== Candidates ====
- Ralph A. Loveys, incumbent Assembly member since 1984 (Republican)
- Robert Martin, incumbent Assembly member since February 1985 (Republican)
- Claude C. Post (Democratic)
- Joseph V. Vender (Democratic)

==== Results ====
1985 general election
Party	Candidate	Votes	%	±%
Republican	Robert J. Martin (incumbent)	31,943	37.6	▲1.4
Republican	Ralph A. Loveys (incumbent)	31,898	37.5	▲4.7
Democratic	Claude C. Post	10,697	12.6	▼3.0
Democratic	Joseph V. Vender	10,425	12.3	▼3.1
Total votes		'84,963'	'100.0'	

== District 27 ==
=== General election ===
==== Candidates ====
- Jean Brozyna (Republican)
- Chandler Dennis (Republican)
- Mildred Barry Garvin, incumbent Assembly member since 1978 (Democratic)
- Harry A. McEnroe, incumbent Assembly member since 1980 (Democratic)

==== Results ====
1985 general election
Party	Candidate	Votes	%	±%
Democratic	Harry A. McEnroe (incumbent)	20,780	31.5	▼5.4
Democratic	Mildred Barry Garvin (incumbent)	20,680	31.3	▼5.1
Republican	Jean Brozyna	12,345	18.7	▲4.9
Republican	Chandler Dennis	12,167	18.4	▲5.4
Total votes		'65,972'	'100.0'	

== District 28 ==
=== General election ===
==== Candidates ====
- Michael Adubato, incumbent Assembly member since 1974 (Democratic)
- Joe Imperiale
- Jose Linares, attorney (Republican)
- James Zangari, incumbent Assembly member since 1980 (Democratic)

==== Results ====
1985 general election
Party	Candidate	Votes	%	±%
Democratic	Michael F. Adubato (incumbent)	12,495	30.4	▼4.1
Democratic	James Zangari (incumbent)	12,092	29.4	▼3.0
Republican	Joe Imperiale	8,604	20.9	▲8.3
Republican	Jose Linares	7,896	19.2	▲8.5
Total votes		'41,087'	'100.0'	

== District 29 ==
=== General election ===
==== Candidates ====
- Willie B. Brown, incumbent Assembly member since 1974 (Democratic)
- Kurt A. Culbreath (Republican)
- Eugene H. Thompson, incumbent Assembly member since 1978 (Democratic)
- Della Moses Walker (Republican)

==== Results ====
1985 general election
Party	Candidate	Votes	%	±%
Democratic	Willie B. Brown (incumbent)	12,736	35.2	▼7.1
Democratic	Eugene H. Thompson (incumbent)	12,224	33.7	▼7.9
Republican	Della Moses Walker	5,852	16.2	▲7.6
Republican	Kurt A. Culbreath	5,420	15.0	▲7.5
Total votes		'36,232'	'100.0'	

== District 30 ==
=== General election ===
==== Candidates ====
- Steve Adubato Jr., incumbent Assembly member since 1984 (Democratic)
- Marion Crecco, advertising executive and chair of the Bloomfield Republican Party Committee (Republican)
- Buddy Fortunato, incumbent Assembly member since 1978 (Democratic)
- John V. Kelly, former Assembly member from Nutley (Republican)

==== Results ====
1985 general election
Party	Candidate	Votes	%	±%
Republican	John V. Kelly	30,820	28.3	▲3.1
Republican	Marion Crecco	28,268	26.0	▲8.4
Democratic	Stephen N. Adubato, Jr. (incumbent)	25,505	23.4	▼3.2
Democratic	Buddy Fortunato (incumbent)	24,290	22.3	▼6.0
Total votes		'108,883'	'100.0'	

== District 31 ==
=== General election ===
==== Candidates ====
- Nat Amadeo (Republican)
- Joseph Charles, incumbent Assembly member since 1982 (Democratic)
- Joseph Doria, incumbent Assembly member since 1980 (Democratic)
- Bruce M. Shipitofsky (Republican)

==== Results ====
1985 general election
Party	Candidate	Votes	%	±%
Democratic	Joseph V. Doria, Jr. (incumbent)	25,613	31.8	▼8.6
Democratic	Joseph Charles, Jr. (incumbent)	24,612	30.6	▼8.8
Republican	Nat S. Amadeo	15,380	19.1	▲9.1
Republican	Bruce M. Shipitofsky	14,942	18.6	▲9.5
Total votes		80,547	100.0	

== District 32 ==
=== General election ===
==== Candidates ====
- Charles J. Catrillo, director of water for Jersey City (Republican)
- Paul Cuprowski, incumbent Assembly member since 1983 (Democratic)
- Frank J. Gargiulo (Republican)
- Edith M. Shaw (Politicians Are Crooks)
- Herbert H. Shaw, perennial candidate (Politicians Are Crooks)
- Anthony P. Vanieri, incumbent Assembly member since 1984 (Democratic)

==== Results ====
1985 general election
Party	Candidate	Votes	%	±%
Republican	Frank J. Gargiulo	25,179	27.1	▲10.4
Republican	Charles J. Catrillo	24,798	26.7	▲10.4
Democratic	Paul Cuprowski (incumbent)	21,018	22.7	▼9.4
Democratic	Anthony P. Vainieri (incumbent)	19,977	21.5	▼10.0
Politicians Are Crooks	Edith M. Shaw	896	1.0	▼0.8
Politicians Are Crooks	Herbert H. Shaw	877	0.9	▼0.7
Total votes		'92,745'	'100.0'	

== District 33 ==
=== General election ===
==== Candidates ====
- Jose Arango (Republican)
- Ronald Dario, member of the Union City Commission (Republican)
- Mario R. Hernandez (Democratic)
- Robert Ranieri, incumbent Assembly member since 1984 (Democratic)

==== Results ====
1985 general election
Party	Candidate	Votes	%	±%
Republican	Ronald A. Dario	20,422	27.9	▲10.0
Republican	Jose O. Arango	19,748	26.9	▲9.7
Democratic	Robert A. Ranieri (incumbent)	17,443	23.8	▼8.9
Democratic	Mario R. Hernandez	15,671	21.4	▼10.8
Total votes		'73,284'	'100.0'	

== District 34 ==
=== General election ===
==== Candidates ====
- Elisa Leib (Democratic)
- Newton Edward Miller, incumbent Assembly member since 1980 (Republican)
- Joseph F. Palumbo (Democratic)
- Gerald H. Zecker, incumbent Assembly member since 1984 (Republican)

==== Results ====
1985 general election
Party	Candidate	Votes	%	±%
Republican	Gerald H. Zecker (incumbent)	32,025	32.3	▲6.1
Republican	Newton E. Miller (incumbent)	31,791	32.1	▲5.4
Democratic	Joseph F. Palumbo	17,784	18.0	▼5.5
Democratic	Elisa Leib	17,411	17.6	▼4.1
Total votes		'99,011'	'100.0'	

== District 35 ==
=== General election ===
==== Candidates ====
- John Girgenti, incumbent Assembly member since 1978 (Democratic)
- Vincent O. Pellecchia, incumbent Assembly member since 1972 (Democratic)
- Walter W. Porter Jr. (Republican)
- Kenneth Van Rye (Republican)

==== Results ====
1985 general election
Party	Candidate	Votes	%	±%
Democratic	John A. Girgenti (incumbent)	18,634	30.2	▼7.4
Democratic	Vincent “Ozzie” Pellecchia (incumbent)	16,204	26.3	▼8.8
Republican	Walter W. Porter, Jr.	13,538	21.9	▲8.0
Republican	Kenneth Van Rye	13,352	21.6	▲8.2
Total votes		'61,728'	'100.0'	

== District 36 ==
=== General election ===
==== Candidates ====
- Paul DiGaetano, member of the Passaic City Council (Republican)
- Kathleen Donovan, Lyndhurst public defender (Republican)
- Robert P. Hollenbeck, incumbent Assembly member since 1974 (Democratic)
- Richard F. Visotcky, incumbent Assembly member since 1974 (Democratic)

==== Results ====
1985 general election
Party	Candidate	Votes	%	±%
Republican	Kathleen A. Donovan	24,775	27.4	▲7.4
Republican	Paul DiGaetano	24,555	27.2	▲7.5
Democratic	Robert P. Hollenbeck (incumbent)	21,295	23.6	▼7.5
Democratic	Richard F. Visotcky (incumbent)	19,764	21.9	▼7.2
Total votes		'90,389'	'100.0'	

== District 37 ==
=== General election ===
==== Candidates ====
- Byron Baer, incumbent Assembly member since 1972 (Democratic)
- Nicholas Corbiscello (Republican)
- Martin Katz (Republican)
- D. Bennett Mazur, incumbent Assembly member since 1982 (Democratic)

==== Results ====
1985 general election
Party	Candidate	Votes	%	±%
Democratic	D. Bennett Mazur (incumbent)	27,376	27.0	▼3.9
Democratic	Byron Baer (incumbent)	27,335	26.9	▼4.5
Republican	Nicholas Corbiscello	24,300	23.9	▲5.0
Republican	Martin Katz	22,453	22.1	▲3.4
Total votes		'101,464'	'100.0'	

== District 38 ==
=== General election ===
==== Candidates ====
- Thomas K. Hynes (Democratic)
- Louis F. Kosco, incumbent Assembly member since 1980 (Republican)
- Richard Kraus (Libertarian)
- Pat Schuber, incumbent Assembly member since 1982 (Republican)
- David S. Turetsky (Democratic)

==== Results ====
1985 general election
Party	Candidate	Votes	%	±%
Republican	William P. Schuber (incumbent)	29,606	30.8	▲3.9
Republican	Louis F. Kosco (incumbent)	29,096	30.2	▲3.1
Democratic	Thomas K. Hynes	19,033	19.8	▼3.9
Democratic	David S. Turetsky	18,190	18.9	▼3.5
Libertarian	Richard Kraus	313	0.3	N/A
Total votes		'96,238'	'100.0'	

== District 39 ==
=== General election ===
==== Candidates ====
- Joe Ferriero, member of the Dumont Borough Council (Democratic)
- Elizabeth Randall, assistant counsel to Governor Thomas Kean (Republican)
- John E. Rooney, incumbent Assembly member since 1983 (Republican)
- Fay Yeager (Democratic)

==== Results ====
1985 general election
Party	Candidate	Votes	%	±%
Republican	Elizabeth E. Randall	35,172	33.3	▲4.4
Republican	John E. Rooney (incumbent)	33,358	31.6	▲2.9
Democratic	Joseph A. Ferriero	18,714	17.7	▼4.2
Democratic	Fay Yeager	18,257	17.3	▼3.2
Total votes		105,501	100.0	

== District 40 ==
=== General election ===
==== Candidates ====
- Carmine J. Cicchino (Democratic)
- Nicholas Felice, incumbent Assembly member since 1982 (Republican)
- Walter M. D. Kern, incumbent Assembly member since 1978 (Republican)
- Judy Miller (Democratic)

==== Results ====
1985 general election
Party	Candidate	Votes	%	±%
Republican	Walter M. D. Kern, Jr. (incumbent)	36,476	35.9	▲1.3
Republican	Nicholas R. Felice (incumbent)	36,369	35.8	▲1.9
Democratic	Judy Miller	14,590	14.4	▼1.6
Democratic	Carmine J. Cicchino	14,050	13.8	▼1.7
Total votes		'101,485'	'100.0'	
