= Frank C. Italiano =

American politician

Member of the New Jersey Senate from the 3rd district
- In office January 9, 1968 – January 8, 1974
- Preceded by: District created
- Succeeded by: John J. Horn; Redistricted to 5th district

Personal details
- Party: Republican

Frank C. Italiano is an American politician from New Jersey best known for being a State Senator for the 3rd district.

== Biography ==
Italiano was elected to the state senate in 1967 to the newly created 3rd district. Italiano was a supporter of the League of Women Voters during his time in office. Italiano worked an alliance with Camden City Democratic Chairman Angelo Errichetti to insulate him from Democratic opposition.

Despite this, in 1971 the New Jersey Democratic Party made a concerted effort to try and defeat Italiano's re-election bid, initially seeking James Florio, then a member of the General Assembly, to run against him, however, Florio declined due to Italiano's support from Errichetti. Despite this Italiano would only narrowly beat Thomas R. Bristow by a 50.7%-49.3% margin with just 697 votes separating the two.

Following the Watergate scandal and the defeat of incumbent Republican governor William T. Cahill in the primaries, Italiano declined to seek re-election to a third term in 1973. Instead, as one of his last acts in office, Cahill would appoint Italiano as a judge of the Camden County District Court. The third district would be re-districted to become the 5th district, with John J. Horn succeeding Italiano.
