= William K. Dickey =

American politician (1920–2008)

William K. Dickey (September 12, 1920 – November 3, 2008) was an American lawyer and Republican Party politician who served as Speaker of the New Jersey General Assembly and as chairman of the Delaware River Port Authority.

== Biography ==
Dickey was born in 1920 in the Westmont section of Haddon Township, New Jersey. He attended Collingswood High School, graduating in 1939. An eye injury at the age of 16 exempted him from active military service, but after graduating from high school he served in the United States Coast Guard Reserve. He also supported his family by working full-time on the night shift at the New York Shipbuilding Corporation in Camden.

Dickey graduated from the College of South Jersey (now Rutgers University–Camden) in 1941 and from the South Jersey Law School (now Rutgers School of Law - Camden) in 1944. He later earned an additional B.A. degree from the University of Pennsylvania.

He was admitted to the New Jersey Bar in 1945 and opened a legal practice in Collingswood in 1950. He maintained the office until his retirement in 2007. He served eight years as a municipal judge for Collingswood, Gibbsboro, and Medford. He was also elected president of the New Jersey Jaycees.

Dickey became active in Republican politics in Camden County, serving as chairman of the Collingswood Republican Club for 16 years. In 1962 he was named Camden County Republican Campaign Chairman. The following year he was elected to the first of five consecutive terms in the New Jersey General Assembly.

In the Assembly, Dickey was selected as Minority Leader in 1967, Majority Leader in 1968 and 1969, and Speaker in 1970. In 1973, he lost his bid for reelection in a statewide Democratic landslide in the wake of the Watergate scandal. He also ran unsuccessfully for the Assembly in 1975 and 1977.

In 1980, at the age of 60, Dickey married Irene Campbell, a divorcee with four children. They had known each other since high school.

In 1983, Governor Thomas Kean appointed Dickey to the Board of Commissioners for the Delaware River Port Authority. He served as chairman from 1985 to 1987, and remained on the board until 1994.

Dickey retired from his Collingswood legal practice in 2007. He died in 2008 at the age of 88 at his home in Haddonfield.

New Jersey General Assembly
Preceded by Frank E. Meloni; Robert W. Yost	Member of the New Jersey General Assembly from the Camden County district January 14, 1964–January 9, 1968; Served alongside: A. Donald Bigley, Francis J. Werner, Sidney P. McCord, Jr., Richard S. Hyland, John J. Horn, John L. Miller	Succeeded by Constituency abolished
Preceded by Constituency established	Member of the New Jersey General Assembly from the 3C district January 9, 1968–January 8, 1974; Served alongside: Eugene Raymond III	Succeeded by Constituency abolished
Political offices
Preceded by Peter Moraites	Speaker of the New Jersey General Assembly; 1970	Succeeded by Barry T. Parker
