= Lee B. Laskin =

American politician (1936–2024)

Judge of New Jersey Superior Court
- In office 1996 – June 2006 (Note: While Laskin retired in 2006, he had been recalled to judicial service every two years, with the last one beginning in 2014 and ending in 2016)

Member of the New Jersey Senate from the 6th district
- In office January 10, 1978 – January 14, 1992
- Preceded by: Alene S. Ammond
- Succeeded by: John Adler

Member of the Camden County Board of Chosen Freeholders
- In office 1970–1973

Member of the New Jersey General Assembly from District 3D
- In office January 9, 1968 – January 13, 1970 Serving with John J. Horn
- Preceded by: District created
- Succeeded by: James Florio

Personal details
- Born: June 30, 1936 Atlantic City, New Jersey, U.S.
- Died: April 18, 2024 (aged 87) Evesham Township, New Jersey, U.S.
- Party: Republican
- Other political affiliations: Democratic (formerly)
- Spouse: Andrea Solomon
- Children: 1
- Education: American University; Temple University; Rutgers School of Law–Camden
- Occupation: Attorney, politician

Lee B. Laskin (June 30, 1936 – April 18, 2024) was an American judge, politician and attorney from Camden, New Jersey who served in both chambers of the New Jersey Legislature from 1968 to 1992.

As a state senator, he cast the deciding vote to retain Robert Wilentz as chief justice of the New Jersey Supreme Court in 1986. He was considered a political renegade and earned the nickname "Dr. No" for frequently obstructing legislation.

After his surprising defeat in the 1991 election, Governor Christine Todd Whitman appointed him to serve on the New Jersey Superior Court. He reached the mandatory retirement age in 2006, though he was frequently recalled for service thereafter until 2016.

== Early life and education ==
Lee Laskin was born in Atlantic City, New Jersey on June 30, 1936.

Laskin graduated from Camden High School in 1954. He did his undergraduate studies at American University and Temple University.

He graduated from Rutgers Law School in 1960 and worked as a law clerk for U.S. representative William T. Cahill.

== Political career ==
In 1962, Laskin was appointed by the City of Camden as an assistant city solicitor. From 1964 to 1966, he was an Assistant U.S. Attorney for the District of New Jersey.

Beginning in 1966, Laskin entered private practice, working as a municipal attorney throughout Camden County and representing local boards of education, and non-profit organizations. He founded and served as chairman of Glendale National Bank. Among the organizations he represented as an attorney was a bipartisan coalition opposed to Democratic state senator Alfred R. Pierce.

=== New Jersey General Assembly (1968–70) ===
In 1967, Laskin sought to challenge Pierce as a Republican, but the party gave its primary endorsement to Frank Italiano, a former Camden city commissioner and local judge. Instead, Laskin chose to run for the General Assembly in a newly drawn district consisting of Camden, Audubon, Audubon Park, and Haddon Township. The district was drawn as a result of the New Jersey Supreme Court's decision in Jackman v. Bodine.

In the 1967 general election, Laskin and his running mate, local NAACP leader Gretchen Waples, faced Democratic incumbent John Horn and Camden councilman Elijah Perry. In a strong year for the Republican Party in New Jersey, Horn ran 350 votes ahead of Laskin, who won the district's second seat over Perry by 1,807 votes.

As a freshman legislator, Laskin launched a probe into the finances of independent agencies and helped establish the South Jersey Port Corporation. He also sought the repeal of a law giving the Delaware River Port Authority control over the redevelopment of the Camden Waterfront. In January 1968, Laskin was one of three Republicans who abstained when the majority voted 56–11 to repeal provisions providing unemployment benefits to workers during labor disputes.

In January 1969, Laskin was one of three legislators identified by assistant attorney general William J. Brennan III referred to him and two other legislators as being "too comfortable with members of organized crime", allegations Laskin called a "joke." Laskin was a regular patron at a Mafia-controlled bar, but he testified before an Assembly committee that he had been invited to the bar by a client without knowledge of its criminal connections. The Assembly's investigation committee concluded that there was no evidence to support the claims against Laskin and three other elected officials, though it chastised two other legislators.

=== Camden County freeholder (1970–73) ===
In 1969, Laskin chose not to seek re-election to the Assembly and declined to run for mayor of Camden. He instead ran for a three-year term on the Camden County Board of Chosen Freeholders, and he was succeeded in the Assembly by James Florio, a young Democratic attorney and future governor.

At the time, the board was unanimously Republican, but incumbent Thomas J. Shusted chose to run for Assembly and incumbent Peter Del Grande had lost party support for another term. Laskin was nominated and ran with former Voorhees Township mayor Barnaby McAuslan. With Laskin's former mentor William Cahill carrying the county in a landslide in the gubernatorial election, both Laskin and McAuslan were easily elected.

As a freeholder, Laskin feuded with the Republican Party county chairman, Henry Leiner, and did not seek re-election in 1972. After leaving office, he continued the feud by recruiting Dominick Spadea to challenge Leiner in 1973; Spadea lost by 48 votes. Laskin himself would be elected county chair in 1976, ousting incumbent Richard C. Hardenburgh.

=== New Jersey Senate (1977–92) ===
In 1977, Democratic incumbent Alene S. Ammond lost the support of her party to Victor S. Pachter, who defeated her narrowly in the primary. Republicans initially recruited William Cahill Jr. before settling on county parks commissioner Addison Bradley. After the primary, however, Bradley faced allegations that he had used his job to influence a private land deal and dropped out of the race. Laskin was chosen to run in his place, sidelining former Assembly speaker William Dickey and Cherry Hill mayor John Rocco. Rocco, who was elected to the Assembly in 1979, feuded with Laskin for much of their time in Trenton.

In the general election, Laskin defeated Pachter with 52 percent of the vote. Laskin was re-elected to the Senate in 1981 against Cherry Hill judge James Greenberg, 1983 against Audubon mayor Francis Ward, and 1987 against Cherry Hill mayor Maria Barnaby Greenwald. Greenwald was his closest challenger, winning 47 percent of the vote.

==== Wilentz retention ====
In 1986, Laskin cast the decisive vote to retain Robert N. Wilentz as chief justice of the Supreme Court of New Jersey.

Wilentz, a former Assembly speaker and leader of a Democratic political dynasty, had been reappointed by Republican governor Tom Kean but was opposed by many senators for his controversial Mount Laurel doctrine and for splitting his residence between New Jersey and New York while his wife was undergoing chemotherapy. In addition to Republicans Gerald Cardinale, who led the opposition, and Peter P. Garibaldi, whose invocation of senatorial courtesy forced Wilentz to list his residence as Deal rather than his native Perth Amboy, Wilentz faced opposition from five Democratic senators: Frank Pallone, Paul Contillo, Catherine Costa, Raymond Zane, and Daniel Dalton. As a result, Wilentz needed three Republican votes for his retention to survive. Kean lobbied Republican senators throughout the confirmation battle, threatening them with primary challenges and eventually convincing Bill Gormley and Wayne Dumont to flip.

Laskin, who had served in the Assembly with Wilentz, held out until the day of the official vote. Having extracted concessions from both Wilentz and Kean to ensure that all New Jersey judges live in the state, Laskin cast the deciding vote for Wilentz's retention as chief justice. Wilentz reassured Laskin and Kean that he would move back to New Jersey once his wife's condition improved. Laskin referred to the vote as "the most difficult day I've ever had in the legislature."

==== 1991 defeat ====
In 1988, Kean nominated labor leader George Norcross to the state racing commission, but Laskin used senatorial courtesy to block the appointment. As a result, when Norcross's son George III became Democratic county chairman in 1991, he sought revenge against Laskin.

Despite a Republican landslide in the 1991 elections fueled by voter anger at a $2.8 billion tax increase, Laskin was the sole incumbent Republican legislator defeated, although both of his Assembly running mates were re-elected. He faced a late blitz of television advertising in the Philadelphia media market attacking him and supporting his opponent, Cherry Hill councilman John Adler. The Adler campaign and the Democratic Party spent a record amount on the election, airing ads during a Philadelphia Eagles game on Monday Night Football and Game 7 of the 1991 World Series. Funded partly by a $250,000 person loan from George Norcross III, the Democratic campaign deliberately began late to catch Laskin off guard and viciously attacked his record, such as a mailer which referenced Laskin's vote against an assault weapons ban with a chalk outline reading, "You could be next."

Adler criticized Laskin directly for receiving "sweetheart patronage contracts" as a municipal attorney, calling the senator "parasitic and self-serving, the ultimate political hack." Laskin described Adler as "an absolute lunatic." Adler also charged that Laskin had used his office to distribute campaign advertising and cited Laskin's poor attendance record, which Adler claimed was related to his legal work.

== Judicial career ==
After his 1991 defeat, Laskin was widely expected to receive a judicial appointment as a compromise between Jim Florio and the new Republican senate majority. However, following allegations that the Republicans were blocking other Camden County nominees to force his nomination, Laskin had a heart attack in May 1993 and withdrew from consideration.

In July 1994, Republican governor Christine Todd Whitman nominated Laskin to a seven-year term on the New Jersey Superior Court, citing "his qualifications, his background... and things like temperament and demeanor." John Adler supported his nomination.

In September 1998, Laskin ruled that a set of seven embryos created by a couple while they were married should be destroyed after their divorce. The ex-husband had wanted the embryos retained so that they might possibly be implanted or donated, while the ex-wife petitioned for their destruction.

While retiring from the Superior Court in June 2006, Laskin was recalled multiple times to serve as a senior judge. He had been recalled every two years, with the final one beginning in 2014 and ending in 2016.

== Personal life and death ==
He and his wife Andrea had a daughter, Shari, and three grandchildren, Samantha, Molly and Matthew Tarnopol. They had a son who died at age three.

He lived in the Marlton section of Evesham Township, New Jersey and died at his home there from complications related to COVID-19 on April 18, 2024.
