= Raymond Zane =

American politician (1939–2024)

Member of the New Jersey Senate from the 3rd district
- In office January 8, 1974 – January 8, 2002
- Preceded by: James M. Turner
- Succeeded by: Stephen Sweeney

Personal details
- Born: Raymond John Zane; July 23, 1939 Woodbury, New Jersey, U.S.
- Died: January 8, 2024 (aged 84)
- Party: Democratic (before 2001); Republican (after 2001)
- Education: St. Joseph's College (BS); Rutgers University (JD)

Raymond John Zane (July 23, 1939 – January 8, 2024) was an American politician who served in the New Jersey State Senate from 1974 to 2002, where he represented the 3rd Legislative District. First elected in 1973 and re-elected seven times as a Democrat, Zane lost re-election in 2001 as a Republican. He ran for his seat as a Republican again in 2003 but ultimately dropped out. In later years, he rejoined the Democratic Party before dying on January 8, 2024, at the age of 84.

== Early life and education ==
Born on July 23, 1939, in Woodbury, Zane attended Woodbury Junior-Senior High School. A star pitcher on the school's baseball team, he was signed by the Pittsburgh Pirates and played until his professional career was ended by injury.

Zane earned his undergraduate degree from St. Joseph's College in New York with a major in business administration, then earned his J.D. from Rutgers School of Law–Camden. He was an attorney by profession with the firm of Zane and Lozuke.

== Elected office ==
Before serving in the New Jersey Legislature, Zane was a member of the Gloucester County, New Jersey Board of Chosen Freeholders from 1972 to 1974.

Zane served in the Senate as the Assistant Majority Leader from 1986 to 1989, as the Deputy Assistant Minority Leader from 1992 to 1998 and as Deputy Minority Leader starting in 1998. He served there on the Judiciary Committee and the Legislative Oversight Committee.

Zane had been elected to eight terms in office as a Democrat and announced his switch to the Republican Party in February 2001 at a news conference where he was joined by Acting Governor of New Jersey Donald T. DiFrancesco and other party leaders. In a refer back to Ronald Reagan, Zane said that "I didn't leave the Democratic Party, but outgrew it." Zane criticized Democratic Party bosses in Camden County and what he perceived as their efforts to bring "boss-style politics" into Gloucester County. Zane had been feuding with Gloucester County Democratic Party head Michael A. Angelini, and the feud had escalated to the point that Zane faced the prospect of a challenge in the Democratic primary from Stephen M. Sweeney, then director of the Gloucester County Board of Chosen Freeholders. In response to Zane's departure from the Democratic Party, Angelini stated that "Ray Zane's career has always been about money", and claimed that Zane had switched parties because his law firm had lost county contracts to service municipalities and school districts. Zane had been earning close to $95,000 a year from contracts with the Deptford Township Schools, the Gloucester County Vocational-Technical School District, the Gloucester County Board of Social Services, and with the municipalities of Greenwich Township, Paulsborp and Penns Grove. Starting in 2000, Zane's paid positions were gradually stripped away from him, including a $40,000 a year position with the Gloucester County Improvement Authority. The New York Times reported on speculation that Angelini's opposition to Zane stemmed from Zane's relationship with Republican Assembly Speaker Jack Collins and that Zane only offered "lukewarm support" to the Democratic challengers in the 3rd Legislative District.

Zane went unchallenged in the Republican primary, but was defeated by Sweeney in the 2001 general elections by a margin of 51.5%-48.5%. Sweeney was aided by the strong support of Camden County Democratic head George Norcross III in the Camden portion of the district. The race was the most expensive in New Jersey history at the time, totaling $2.4 million, with Sweeney spending $1.8 million to Zane's $624,000. It was the most expensive legislative race in the state until $4 million was spent in Fred H. Madden's successful race to unseat George Geist in 2003.
