= New Jersey's 3rd legislative district =

American legislative district

- Senator: John Burzichelli (D)
- Assembly members: Heather Simmons (D); Dave Bailey (D)
- Registration: 33.74% Democratic; 30.75% Republican; 34.24% unaffiliated
- Demographics: 66.9% White; 14.4% Black/African American; 0.8% Native American; 2.0% Asian; 0.0% Hawaiian/Pacific Islander; 8.4% Other race; 7.6% Two or more races; 15.0% Hispanic
- Population: 233,238
- Voting-age population: 180,926
- Registered voters: 159,457

New Jersey's 3rd legislative district is one of 40 in the state. As of the 2021 apportionment the district covers the Cumberland County municipalities of Deerfield Township, Greenwich Township, Hopewell Township, Shiloh Borough, Stow Creek Township, and Upper Deerfield Township; the Gloucester County municipalities of Clayton, East Greenwich Township, Elk Township, Glassboro, Greenwich Township, Harrison Township, Logan Township, Mantua Township, National Park, Paulsboro, Pitman, South Harrison Township, Swedesboro, Wenonah Borough, West Deptford Township, Westville, and Woolwich Township, and all of Salem County.

== Demographic characteristics ==
As of the 2020 United States census, the district had a population of 233,238, of whom 180,926 (77.6%) were of voting age. The racial makeup of the district was 155,956 (66.9%) White, 33,610 (14.4%) African American, 1,819 (0.8%) Native American, 4,611 (2.0%) Asian, 57 (0.0%) Pacific Islander, 19,499 (8.4%) from some other race, and 17,686 (7.6%) from two or more races. Hispanic or Latino people of any race were 34,897 (15.0%) of the population.

The district had 159,457 registered voters as of December 1, 2021, of whom 58,474 (36.7%) were registered as unaffiliated, 57,390 (36.0%) were registered as Democrats, 41,186 (25.8%) were registered as Republicans, and 2,407 (1.5%) were registered to other parties.

== Political representation ==
For the 2026–2027 session, the 3rd legislative district of the New Jersey Legislature is represented in the State Senate by John Burzichelli (D, Paulsboro) and in the General Assembly by David Bailey (D, Woodstown) and Heather Simmons (D, Glassboro).

The legislative district overlaps with New Jersey's 1st and 2nd congressional districts.

== 1965–1973 ==
The 1964 Supreme Court decision in Reynolds v. Sims required legislative districts' populations be equal as possible. As an interim measure, the 3rd District in the 1965 State Senate election encompassed all of Camden County and elected two members to the Senate. In this case, Republican Frederick Scholz and Democrat A. Donald Bigley were sent to Trenton for a two-year term beginning in 1966.

For the next three elections, the 3rd District became made up of all of Camden, Gloucester, and Salem counties and was further divided into four Assembly districts (Districts 3A, 3B, 3C, and 3D). In the 1967 and 1971 Senate elections, a total of four Senators were elected from the district but candidates were nominated by Assembly district and were elected by only the residents of the respective district. Each Assembly district elected two members in each election.

The members elected to the Senate from each district are as follows:

Session	District 3A	District 3B	District 3C	District 3D
1968–1969	John L. White (R)	Hugh A. Kelly Jr. (R)	John L. Miller (R)	Frank C. Italiano (R)
1970–1971	John L. White (R)	Hugh A. Kelly Jr. (R)	John L. Miller (R)	Frank C. Italiano (R)
1972–1973	James M. Turner (R) (Note: Removed from the Senate on June 28, 1973 after being convicted for conspiring to place drugs in Assemblyman Kenneth A. Gewertz's home mailbox)	Joseph A. Maressa (D)	John L. Miller (R)	Frank C. Italiano (R) (Note: Resigned November 29, 1973 to become a judge in the District Court in Camden County)

The members elected to the Assembly from each district are as follows:

Session	District 3A	District 3B	District 3C	District 3D
1968–1969	Joseph H. Enos (R)	Walter E. Pedersen (R)	William K. Dickey (R)	John J. Horn (D)
1968–1969	Kenneth A. Black Jr. (R)	Leonard H. Kaser (R)	Eugene Raymond III (R)	Lee B. Laskin (R)
1970–1971	Joseph H. Enos (R) (Note: Resigned July 1, 1971, to accept a position at the Delaware Valley Regional Planning Commission)	James M. Turner (R)	William K. Dickey (R)	John J. Horn (D)
1970–1971	Kenneth A. Black Jr. (R)	Thomas J. Shusted (R) (Note: Resigned March 9, 1971)	Eugene Raymond III (R)	James Florio (D)
1972–1973	Kenneth A. Black Jr. (R)	Francis J. Gorman (D)	William K. Dickey (R)	John J. Horn (D)
1972–1973	H. Donald Stewart (D)	Kenneth A. Gewertz (D)	Eugene Raymond III (R)	James Florio (D)

== District composition since 1973 ==
Starting in 1973 with the creation of 40 equal-population districts statewide, the 3rd District was made up of all of Salem County and most of Gloucester County. Some southeastern Gloucester County municipalities were removed from the District in the 1981 redistricting but several sparsely populated Cumberland County townships along the Delaware Bay were added. The Cumberland County city of Bridgeton and some adjacent townships were added in the 1991 redistricting but the boroughs of Pitman and Glassboro were moved out. The only changes made during the 2001 redistricting were the removal of Woodbury and the addition of Elk Township and Clayton borough.

The 2011 reapportionment added Franklin Township (from 4th District), Glassboro (4th), Newfield (4th) and Woodbury Heights (5th). Municipalities that had been in the 3rd District as part of the 2001 apportionment that were shifted out of the district are Commercial Township, Downe Township, Fairfield Township, Greenwich Township, Hopewell Township, Lawrence Township, Shiloh and Stow Creek Township (all to the 1st District); and Harrison Township, Mantua Township and Wenonah (all to the 5th District). Under the 2021 apportionment, Bridgeton, Franklin Township, Newfield, and Woodbury Heights were removed while numerous Cumberland and Gloucester County townships and boroughs were added comprising 22% of the district.

== Election history ==
Session	Senate	General Assembly	
1974–1975	Raymond Zane (D)	H. Donald Stewart (D)	Martin A. Herman (D)
1976–1977	Raymond Zane (D)	H. Donald Stewart (D)	Martin A. Herman (D)
1978–1979	Raymond Zane (D)	H. Donald Stewart (D)	Martin A. Herman (D)
1980–1981	Raymond Zane (D)	H. Donald Stewart (D)	Martin A. Herman (D)
1982–1983	Raymond Zane (D)	Thomas A. Pankok (D)	Martin A. Herman (D)
1984–1985	Raymond Zane (D)	Thomas A. Pankok (D)	Martin A. Herman (D)
1986–1987	Raymond Zane (D)	Jack Collins (R)	Gary Stuhltrager (R)
1988–1989	Raymond Zane (D)	Jack Collins (R)	Gary Stuhltrager (R)
1990–1991	Raymond Zane (D)	Jack Collins (R)	Gary Stuhltrager (R)
1992–1993	Raymond Zane (D)	Jack Collins (R)	Gary Stuhltrager (R)
1994–1995	Raymond Zane (D)	Jack Collins (R)	Gary Stuhltrager (R)
1996–1997	Raymond Zane (D)	Jack Collins (R)	Gary Stuhltrager (R)
1998–1999	Raymond Zane (D)	Jack Collins (R)	Gary Stuhltrager (R)
2000–2001	Raymond Zane (D)	Jack Collins (R)	Gary Stuhltrager (R)
2000–2001	Raymond Zane (R) (Note: Switched parties on February 22, 2001)	Jack Collins (R)	Gary Stuhltrager (R)
2002–2003	Stephen Sweeney (D)	Douglas H. Fisher (D)	John J. Burzichelli (D)
2004–2005	Stephen Sweeney (D)	Douglas H. Fisher (D)	John J. Burzichelli (D)
2006–2007	Stephen Sweeney (D)	Douglas H. Fisher (D)	John J. Burzichelli (D)
2008–2009	Stephen Sweeney (D)	Douglas H. Fisher (D) (Note: Resigned March 9, 2009 to become Secretary of Agriculture)	John J. Burzichelli (D)
2008–2009	Stephen Sweeney (D)	Celeste Riley (D) (Note: Appointed March 19, 2009)	John J. Burzichelli (D)
2010–2011	Stephen Sweeney (D)	Celeste Riley (D)	John J. Burzichelli (D)
2012–2013	Stephen Sweeney (D)	Celeste Riley (D)	John J. Burzichelli (D)
2014–2015	Stephen Sweeney (D)	Celeste Riley (D) (Note: Resigned January 2, 2015 to become Cumberland County Clerk)	John J. Burzichelli (D)
2014–2015	Stephen Sweeney (D)	Adam Taliaferro (D) (Note: Appointed January 29, 2015)	John J. Burzichelli (D)
2016–2017	Stephen Sweeney (D)	Adam Taliaferro (D)	John J. Burzichelli (D)
2018–2019	Stephen Sweeney (D)	Adam Taliaferro (D)	John J. Burzichelli (D)
2020–2021	Stephen Sweeney (D)	Adam Taliaferro (D)	John J. Burzichelli (D)
2022–2023	Edward Durr (R)	Beth Sawyer (R)	Bethanne McCarthy-Patrick (R)
2024–2025	John J. Burzichelli (D)	Heather Simmons (D)	David Bailey (D)
2026-2027	John J. Burzichelli (D)	Heather Simmons (D)	David Bailey (D)

== Election results, 1973–present ==
=== Senate ===
2021 New Jersey general election
Party	Candidate	Votes	%	±%
Republican	Edward Durr	33,761	51.7	▲10.5
Democratic	Steve Sweeney	31,562	48.3	▼10.5
Total votes		65,323	100.0	

New Jersey general election, 2017
Party	Candidate	Votes	%	±%
Democratic	Steve Sweeney	31,822	58.8	▲4.0
Republican	Fran Grenier	22,336	41.2	▼4.0
Total votes		54,158	100.0	

New Jersey general election, 2013
Party	Candidate	Votes	%	±%
Democratic	Stephen M. Sweeney	31,045	54.8	▼0.8
Republican	Niki A. Trunk	25,599	45.2	▲0.8
Total votes		56,644	100.0	

2011 New Jersey general election
Party	Candidate	Votes	%
Democratic	Stephen M. Sweeney	25,299	55.6
Republican	Michael M. Mulligan	20,197	44.4
Total votes		45,496	100.0

2007 New Jersey general election
Party	Candidate	Votes	%	±%
Democratic	Stephen M. Sweeney	29,908	57.3	▲3.3
Republican	Mark Cimino	20,645	39.6	▼6.4
Get a Grip	William F. Mead	1,635	3.1	N/A
Total votes		52,188	100.0	

2003 New Jersey general election
Party	Candidate	Votes	%	±%
Democratic	Stephen M. Sweeney	29,051	54.0	▲2.5
Republican	Phillip S. Rhudy	24,698	46.0	▼2.5
Total votes		53,749	100.0	

2001 New Jersey general election
Party	Candidate	Votes	%
Democratic	Stephen M. Sweeney	29,873	51.5
Republican	Raymond J. Zane	28,138	48.5
Total votes		58,011	100.0

1997 New Jersey general election
Party	Candidate	Votes	%	±%
Democratic	Raymond J. Zane	46,551	84.5	▲16.9
Conservative	Mary A. Whittam	8,121	14.7	N/A
Republican	No nomination made	415	0.8	▼31.6
Total votes		55,087	100.0	

1993 New Jersey general election
Party	Candidate	Votes	%	±%
Democratic	Raymond J. Zane	40,940	67.6	▲6.7
Republican	Edward J. Reynolds	19,622	32.4	▲0.4
Total votes		60,562	100.0	

1991 New Jersey general election
Party	Candidate	Votes	%
Democratic	Raymond J. Zane	31,648	60.9
Republican	G. Erwin Sheppard	16,600	32.0
No Party Deals	Frank L. Sorrentino	3,683	7.1
Total votes		51,931	100.0

1987 New Jersey general election
Party	Candidate	Votes	%	±%
Democratic	Raymond J. Zane	32,720	63.0	0.0
Republican	John A. Ward	19,224	37.0	0.0
Total votes		51,944	100.0	

1983 New Jersey general election
Party	Candidate	Votes	%	±%
Democratic	Raymond J. Zane	30,179	63.0	▼0.2
Republican	Mary Ruth Talley	17,743	37.0	▲0.2
Total votes		47,922	100.0	

1981 New Jersey general election
Party	Candidate	Votes	%
Democratic	Raymond J. Zane	37,613	63.2
Republican	D. Paul McMahon, Jr.	21,903	36.8
Total votes		59,516	100.0

1977 New Jersey general election
Party	Candidate	Votes	%	±%
Democratic	Raymond J. Zane	37,199	65.8	▼14.1
Republican	Robert C. Hendrickson, Jr.	19,328	34.2	▲14.1
Total votes		56,527	100.0	

1973 New Jersey general election
Party	Candidate	Votes	%
Democratic	Raymond J. Zane	34,266	79.9
Republican	James M. Turner	8,598	20.1
Total votes		42,864	100.0

=== General Assembly ===
2021 New Jersey general election
Party	Candidate	Votes	%	±%
Republican	Beth Sawyer	33,878	26.2	▲3.1
Republican	Bethanne McCarthy Patrick	33,735	26.1	▲4.2
Democratic	John J. Burzichelli	31,024	24.0	▼3.9
Democratic	Adam Taliaferro	30,537	23.6	▼3.5
Total votes		129,174	100.0	

2019 New Jersey general election
Party	Candidate	Votes	%	±%
Democratic	John J. Burzichelli	23,811	27.9	▼2.4
Democratic	Adam Taliaferro	23,179	27.1	▼2.1
Republican	Beth Sawyer	19,704	23.1	▲2.4
Republican	Edward Durr Jr.	18,724	21.9	▲2.7 (▲21.3)
Total votes		85,418	100.0	

New Jersey general election, 2017
Party	Candidate	Votes	%	±%
Democratic	John J. Burzichelli	31,853	30.3	▲1.8
Democratic	Adam Taliaferro	30,733	29.2	▲2.1
Republican	Philip J. Donohue	21,758	20.7	▼1.6
Republican	Linwood H. Donelson III	20,181	19.2	▼1.2
One for All	Edward R. Durr	589	0.6	N/A
Total votes		105,114	100.0	

New Jersey general election, 2015
Party	Candidate	Votes	%	±%
Democratic	John Burzichelli	20,507	28.5	▲0.5
Democratic	Adam Taliaferro	19,480	27.1	▲0.2
Republican	Samuel J. Maccarone Jr.	16,063	22.3	▼0.3
Republican	Leroy P. Pierce III	14,715	20.4	▼2.0
The Peoples Voice	John Kalnas	1,223	1.7	N/A
Total votes		71,988	100.0	

New Jersey general election, 2013
Party	Candidate	Votes	%	±%
Democratic	John J. Burzichelli	31,049	28.0	0.0
Democratic	Celeste M. Riley	29,870	26.9	▲0.3
Republican	Larry Wallace	25,094	22.6	▼0.2
Republican	Bob Vanderslice	24,823	22.4	▼0.1
Total votes		110,836	100.0	

New Jersey general election, 2011
Party	Candidate	Votes	%
Democratic	John J. Burzichelli	25,172	28.0
Democratic	Celeste M. Riley	23,960	26.6
Republican	Bob Villare	20,528	22.8
Republican	Domenick DiCicco	20,268	22.5
Total votes		89,928	100.0

New Jersey general election, 2009
Party	Candidate	Votes	%	±%
Democratic	John J. Burzichelli	35,423	28.3	▼1.2
Democratic	Celeste M. Riley	31,888	25.5	▼3.8
Republican	Robert Villare	30,526	24.4	▲5.4
Republican	Lee Lucas	27,316	21.8	▲3.4
Total votes		125,153	100.0	

New Jersey general election, 2007
Party	Candidate	Votes	%	±%
Democratic	John J. Burzichelli	30,222	29.5	▼0.1
Democratic	Douglas H. Fisher	30,078	29.3	▼0.2
Republican	Phil Donohue	19,534	19.0	▼1.2
Republican	Jeffrey Stepler	18,927	18.4	▼1.1
Green	Margie MacWilliams	2,078	2.0	N/A
Green	Charles Woodrow	1,755	1.7	N/A
Total votes		102,594	100.0	

New Jersey general election, 2005
Party	Candidate	Votes	%	±%
Democratic	John Burzichelli	35,339	29.6	▲4.3
Democratic	Douglas H. Fisher	35,265	29.5	▲4.1
Republican	Phillip S. Rhudy	24,140	20.2	▼3.2
Republican	James W. Zee III	23,297	19.5	▼3.0
Constitution	John Leone	1,535	1.3	N/A
Total votes		119,576	100.0	

New Jersey general election, 2003
Party	Candidate	Votes	%	±%
Democratic	Douglas H. Fisher	27,178	25.4	▼2.7
Democratic	John J. Burzichelli	27,110	25.3	▼1.3
Republican	Susan Bestwick	25,056	23.4	▲0.6
Republican	Douglas Sorantino	24,069	22.5	0.0
Green	Peggy Murphy	1,951	1.8	N/A
Green	Charles Woodrow	1,627	1.5	N/A
Total votes		106,991	100.0	

New Jersey general election, 2001
Party	Candidate	Votes	%
Democratic	Douglas H. Fisher	31,886	28.1
Democratic	John J. Burzichelli	30,213	26.6
Republican	Michael H. Facemyer	25,823	22.8
Republican	Harold U. Johnson	25,509	22.5
Total votes		113,431	100.0

New Jersey general election, 1999
Party	Candidate	Votes	%	±%
Republican	Jack Collins	28,609	31.0	▼5.3
Republican	Gary Stuhltrager	24,573	26.6	▼7.5
Democratic	John J. Burzichelli	20,658	22.4	▲1.6
Democratic	Ron Brittin	15,440	16.7	▲15.4
Conservative	Jan McFetridge	1,599	1.7	▼2.0
Conservative	Bob McFetridge	1,333	1.4	▼2.5
Total votes		92,212	100.0	

New Jersey general election, 1997
Party	Candidate	Votes	%	±%
Republican	Jack Collins	39,046	36.3	▲5.3
Republican	Gary W. Stuhltrager	36,686	34.1	▲3.8
Democratic	Harry L. Rink	22,350	20.8	▲3.4
Conservative	Bob McFetridge	4,160	3.9	▲2.2
Conservative	Jan McFetridge	3,982	3.7	▲2.1
Democratic	No nomination made	1,376	1.3	▼16.7
Total votes		107,600	100.0	

New Jersey general election, 1995
Party	Candidate	Votes	%	±%
Republican	Jack Collins	27,171	31.0	▼1.2
Republican	Gary W. Stuhltrager	26,595	30.3	▼1.1
Democratic	John J. Gentile	15,761	18.0	▼0.6
Democratic	Harry L. Rink	15,292	17.4	▼0.4
Conservative	Robert J. McFetridge	1,494	1.7	N/A
Conservative	William A. Junghans	1,417	1.6	N/A
Total votes		87,730	100.0	

New Jersey general election, 1993
Party	Candidate	Votes	%	±%
Republican	Jack Collins	38,013	32.2	▲2.8
Republican	Gary W. Stuhltrager	37,021	31.4	▲2.8
Democratic	Joseph J. Riley	21,959	18.6	▼1.2
Democratic	Amelia B. Kressler	21,062	17.8	▼1.9
Total votes		118,055	100.0	

1991 New Jersey general election
Party	Candidate	Votes	%
Republican	Jack Collins	30,117	29.4
Republican	Gary W. Stuhltrager	29,314	28.6
Democratic	Benjamin W. Timberman	20,241	19.8
Democratic	Nancy L. Sungenis	20,147	19.7
Populist	James H. Orr, Jr.	1,354	1.3
Populist	Albert S. Fogg, III	1,302	1.3
Total votes		102,475	100.0

1989 New Jersey general election
Party	Candidate	Votes	%	±%
Republican	Jack Collins	33,680	28.0	▲1.3
Republican	Gary W. Stuhltrager	31,526	26.2	▼0.9
Democratic	Thomas A. Pankok	27,165	22.6	▼0.5
Democratic	Robert P. Wooton	26,351	21.9	▼1.2
Independent	James H. Orr, Jr.	1,680	1.4	N/A
Total votes		120,402	100.0	

1987 New Jersey general election
Party	Candidate	Votes	%	±%
Republican	Gary W. Stuhltrager	27,819	27.1	▲1.4
Republican	Jack Collins	27,411	26.7	▲0.5
Democratic	James G. Waddington	23,779	23.1	▼1.4
Democratic	Paul A. Oland	23,755	23.1	▼0.5
Total votes		102,764	100.0	

1985 New Jersey general election
Party	Candidate	Votes	%	±%
Republican	Jack Collins	27,514	26.2	▲3.3
Republican	Gary W. Stuhltrager	27,032	25.7	▲3.5
Democratic	Martin A. Herman	25,699	24.5	▼3.7
Democratic	Thomas A. Pankok	24,796	23.6	▼3.1
Total votes		105,041	100.0	

New Jersey general election, 1983
Party	Candidate	Votes	%	±%
Democratic	Martin A. Herman	26,642	28.2	▼0.4
Democratic	Thomas A. Pankok	25,248	26.7	▲0.5
Republican	Russell E. Paul	21,593	22.9	▲0.2
Republican	Edmund "Duke" Downer	20,976	22.2	▼0.3
Total votes		94,459	100.0	

New Jersey general election, 1981
Party	Candidate	Votes	%
Democratic	Martin A. Herman	32,860	28.6
Democratic	Thomas A. Pankok	30,035	26.2
Republican	G. Erwin Sheppard	26,010	22.7
Republican	David F. Liddle	25,876	22.5
Total votes		114,781	100.0

New Jersey general election, 1979
Party	Candidate	Votes	%	±%
Democratic	H. Donald Stewart	28,739	27.5	▼2.6
Democratic	Martin A. Herman	26,786	25.7	▼1.2
Republican	Jeffrey G. Albertson	25,690	24.6	▲2.4
Republican	F. Dean Kimmel	23,165	22.2	▲1.4
Total votes		104,380	100.0	

New Jersey general election, 1977
Party	Candidate	Votes	%	±%
Democratic	H. Donald Stewart	32,870	30.1	▲0.2
Democratic	Martin A. Herman	29,400	26.9	▲1.2
Republican	Douglas Zee	24,305	22.2	▼0.3
Republican	Thomas P. Haaf	22,804	20.8	▼1.1
Total votes		109,379	100.0	

New Jersey general election, 1975
Party	Candidate	Votes	%	±%
Democratic	H. Donald Stewart	30,054	29.9	▼2.1
Democratic	Martin A. Herman	25,786	25.7	▼2.9
Republican	Douglas Zee	22,608	22.5	▲2.7
Republican	Donald A. Smith, Jr.	22,016	21.9	▲2.3
Total votes		100,464	100.0	

New Jersey general election, 1973
Party	Candidate	Votes	%
Democratic	H. Donald Stewart	35,106	32.0
Democratic	Martin A. Herman	31,340	28.6
Republican	Edmund E. Downer	21,782	19.8
Republican	Lester Harris	21,507	19.6
Total votes		109,735	100.0

== Election results, 1965–1973 ==
=== Senate ===
==== District 3 At-large ====
1965 New Jersey general election
Party	Candidate	Votes	%
Republican	Frederick J. Scholz	66,509	25.8
Democratic	A. Donald Bigley	62,396	24.2
Democratic	Alfred R. Pierce	61,285	23.8
Republican	John H. Mohrfeld, III	59,359	23.0
Independent	Francis J. Werner	5,252	2.0
Independent	Joseph E. Reilly	1,891	0.7
Socialist Labor	Dominic W. Doganiero	933	0.4
Total votes		257,625	100.0

==== District 3A ====
1967 New Jersey general election
Party	Candidate	Votes	%
Republican	John L. White	28,456	54.6
Democratic	John A. Waddington	23,635	45.3
Socialist Labor	Albert Ronis	28	0.1
Total votes		52,119	100.0

1971 New Jersey general election
Party	Candidate	Votes	%
Republican	James M. Turner	26,424	50.010
Democratic	Louis J. Damminger, Jr.	26,413	49.990
Total votes		52,837	100.0

==== District 3B ====
1967 New Jersey general election
Party	Candidate	Votes	%
Republican	Hugh A. Kelly	30,514	55.7
Democratic	Joseph M. Sandone	24,285	44.3
Total votes		54,799	100.0

1971 New Jersey general election
Party	Candidate	Votes	%
Democratic	Joseph A. Maressa	27,347	56.3
Republican	George E. Lord	21,266	43.7
Total votes		48,613	100.0

==== District 3C ====
1967 New Jersey general election
Party	Candidate	Votes	%
Republican	John L. Miller	29,483	61.5
Democratic	Richard S. Hyland	18,454	38.5
Total votes		47,937	100.0

1971 New Jersey general election
Party	Candidate	Votes	%
Republican	John L. Miller	28,345	57.2
Democratic	Morton H. Rappaport	21,168	42.8
Total votes		49,513	100.0

==== District 3D ====
1967 New Jersey general election
Party	Candidate	Votes	%
Republican	Frank C. Italiano	18,735	52.6
Democratic	Alfred R. Pierce	16,690	46.9
Socialist Labor	Dominic W. Doganiero	171	0.5
Total votes		35,596	100.0

1971 New Jersey general election
Party	Candidate	Votes	%
Republican	Frank C. Italiano	22,312	50.8
Democratic	Thomas R. Bristow	21,615	49.2
Total votes		43,927	100.0

=== General Assembly ===
==== District 3A ====
New Jersey general election, 1967
Party	Candidate	Votes	%
Republican	Joseph H. Enos	27,635	27.4
Republican	Kenneth A. Black, Jr.	26,888	26.7
Democratic	John W. Davis	24,142	23.9
Democratic	Harris Y. Cotton	22,188	22.0
Total votes		100,853	100.0

New Jersey general election, 1969
Party	Candidate	Votes	%
Republican	Joseph H. Enos	32,583	28.8
Republican	Kenneth A. Black, Jr.	32,484	28.7
Democratic	Alvin G. Shpeen	24,359	21.5
Democratic	Norman Telsey	23,296	20.6
Independent Party	Tom Newman	181	0.2
Independent Party	Nicholas Halkias	154	0.1
Total votes		113,057	100.0

New Jersey general election, 1971
Party	Candidate	Votes	%
Republican	Kenneth A. Black, Jr.	27,384	26.5
Democratic	H. Donald Stewart	26,137	25.3
Republican	Harold C. Thompson	25,491	24.6
Democratic	Martin A. Herman	24,469	23.6
Total votes		103,481	100.0

==== District 3B ====
New Jersey general election, 1967
Party	Candidate	Votes	%
Republican	Walter E. Pedersen	28,193	26.3
Republican	Leonard H. Kaser	27,025	25.3
Democratic	LeRoy P. Wooster	26,791	25.0
Democratic	William F. Milam	25,011	23.4
Total votes		107,020	100.0

New Jersey general election, 1969
Party	Candidate	Votes	%
Republican	James M. Turner	30,970	27.9
Republican	Thomas J. Shusted	30,598	27.6
Democratic	Thomas A. Lunn	26,014	23.4
Democratic	Joseph J. Master	22,588	20.3
Independent	Joseph Calabrese	582	0.5
Independent	Joseph M. Young	274	0.2
Total votes		111,026	100.0

New Jersey general election, 1971
Party	Candidate	Votes	%
Democratic	Francis J. Gorman	25,569	27.2
Democratic	Kenneth A. Gewertz	24,981	26.5
Republican	William D. Dilks	21,954	23.3
Republican	Anthony L. Esgro	21,591	22.9
Total votes		94,095	100.0

==== District 3C ====
New Jersey general election, 1967
Party	Candidate	Votes	%
Republican	William K. Dickey	30,694	32.6
Republican	Eugene Raymond, III	29,590	31.4
Democratic	Mary Ellen Talbott	17,144	18.2
Democratic	Gordon H. Beckhart	16,788	17.8
Total votes		94,216	100.0

New Jersey general election, 1969
Party	Candidate	Votes	%
Republican	William K. Dickey	41,123	32.1
Republican	Eugene Raymond III	40,140	31.3
Democratic	Ira Rabkin	23,890	18.6
Democratic	Eugene S. Obidinski	22,373	17.5
Independent Party	Robert R. Huntsinger	630	0.5
Total votes		128,156	100.0

New Jersey general election, 1971
Party	Candidate	Votes	%
Republican	William K. Dickey	28,770	29.5
Republican	Eugene Raymond III	26,987	27.7
Democratic	Thomas J. McCart	21,197	21.7
Democratic	John J. Shirk	20,547	21.1
Total votes		97,501	100.0

==== District 3D ====
New Jersey general election, 1967
Party	Candidate	Votes	%
Democratic	John J. Horn	18,349	26.8
Republican	Lee B. Laskin	17,999	26.3
Democratic	Elijah Perry	16,192	23.7
Republican	Gretchen B. Waples	15,827	23.2
Total votes		68,367	100.0

New Jersey general election, 1969
Party	Candidate	Votes	%
Democratic	John J. Horn	19,687	26.7
Democratic	James J. Florio	18,303	24.8
Republican	John H. Mohrfeld III	17,922	24.3
Republican	Gretchen B. Waples	17,244	23.4
Socialist Labor	Dominic W. Doganiero	317	0.4
Socialist Labor	Louis Iuliucci	295	0.4
Total votes		73,768	100.0

New Jersey general election, 1971
Party	Candidate	Votes	%
Democratic	John J. Horn	25,003	28.9
Democratic	James J. Florio	24,897	28.7
Republican	Edward C. Yeager	17,095	19.7
Republican	Eugene V. Hinski	16,909	19.5
Lower Property Taxes	Thomas S. Watson, Jr.	2,729	3.2
Total votes		86,633	100.0
