= Gary Stuhltrager =

American politician (born 1955)

Member of the New Jersey General Assembly from the 3rd Legislative District
- In office January 14, 1986 – January 8, 2002
- Preceded by: Martin A. Herman; Thomas A. Pankok
- Succeeded by: John J. Burzichelli; Douglas H. Fisher

Personal details
- Born: May 25, 1955 (age 70); Camden, New Jersey
- Political party: Republican

Gary W. Stuhltrager (born May 25, 1955) is an American attorney and Republican Party politician who served eight terms in the New Jersey General Assembly from 1986 to 2002, where he represented the 3rd Legislative District.

== Biography ==
Stuhltrager earned his undergraduate degree from Rutgers University and was awarded a J.D. degree from Rutgers School of Law–Camden. An attorney by profession, Stuhltrager served on the Board of Education of the Deptford Township Schools in 1979 and 1980 and on the Gloucester County Board of Chosen Freeholders from 1984 to 1986.

Riding the coattails of Governor of New Jersey Thomas Kean in 1985, Stuhltrager and his running mate Jack Collins knocked off Democratic incumbents Martin A. Herman and Thomas A. Pankok, helping give the Republicans control of the General Assembly for the first time in more than a decade. Stuhltrager was re-elected to seven additional two-year terms, each time together with Collins. He served in the Assembly on the Policy and Regulatory Oversight and was the Majority Parliamentarian starting in 1996.

As part of a series of bills introduced in the Assembly in 1992 to make it harder for New Jersey courts to overturn death sentence convictions when imposing capital punishment in New Jersey, Stuhltrager introduced legislation that would prevent the introduction of evidence regarding the method used for capital punishment during trials, as part of an effort to close off "another avenue for overturning death-penalty sentences". In May 1996, Stuhltrager criticized efforts to delay the imposition of the death penalty, saying "If you're going to have it, do it".
