= Joseph H. Enos =

American politician (1910–1973)

Member of the New Jersey General Assembly from District 3A
- In office January 9, 1968 – July 1, 1971 Serving with Kenneth A. Black Jr.
- Preceded by: District created
- Succeeded by: H. Donald Stewart

Personal details
- Born: March 10, 1910 Paulsboro, New Jersey, U.S.
- Died: March 22, 1973 (aged 63) Clearwater, Florida, U.S.
- Party: Republican

Joseph H. Enos Sr. (March 13, 1910 – March 22, 1973) was an American politician who represented the District 3A in the New Jersey General Assembly for two terms from 1968 to 1971.

== Biography ==
Enos was born in Paulsboro, New Jersey, on March 13, 1910, and graduated in 1928 from Paulsboro High School. After earning an undergraduate degree from Pennsylvania State University in 1933, he completed his law degree in 1940 from South Jersey Law School (since renamed as Rutgers Law School).

He would win election to district 3A in 1967 as a Republican with 27,635 votes alongside Kenneth A. Black Jr.. Enos and Black were re-elected in 1969.

Enos resigned from the legislature in July 1971 before his term ended to accept a position at the Delaware Valley Regional Planning Commission; as state law provided no mechanism to fill a vacancy, the seat remained vacant until H. Donald Stewart was elected in November 1971.

== Personal life ==
He died at the age of 63 after an automobile accident in Clearwater, Florida, on March 22, 1973.

== Electoral history ==
New Jersey general election, 1967
Party	Candidate	Votes	%
Republican	Joseph H. Enos	27,635	27.4
Republican	Kenneth A. Black Jr.	26,888	26.7
Democratic	John W. Davis	24,142	23.9
Democratic	Harris Y. Cotton	22,188	22.0
Total votes		100,853	100.0

New Jersey general election, 1969
Party	Candidate	Votes	%
Republican	Joseph H. Enos	32,583	28.8
Republican	Kenneth A. Black Jr.	32,484	28.7
Democratic	Alvin G. Shpeen	24,359	21.5
Democratic	Norman Telsey	23,296	20.6
Independent Party	Tom Newman	181	0.2
Independent Party	Nicholas Halkias	154	0.1
Total votes		113,057	100.0
