= H. Donald Stewart =

American politician (born 1939)

Member of the New Jersey General Assembly from the 3rd Legislative District
- In office January 8, 1974 – January 12, 1982 Serving with Martin A. Herman
- Preceded by: District created
- Succeeded by: Thomas A. Pankok

Member of the New Jersey General Assembly from District 3A
- In office January 11, 1972 – January 8, 1974 Serving with Kenneth A. Black Jr.
- Preceded by: Joseph H. Enos
- Succeeded by: District abolished

Personal details
- Born: 1939 (age 86–87) Woodbury, New Jersey
- Party: Democratic

H. Donald Stewart (born 1939) is an American Democratic Party politician who served in the New Jersey General Assembly from 1972 to 1982.

A resident of Woodstown, New Jersey, Stewart was born in 1939 in Woodbury, New Jersey. He attended Saint James High School, graduating in 1957, and earned an undergraduate degree in 1961 from the University of Dayton.
