= Kenneth A. Black Jr. =

American politician (1932–2019)

Member of the New Jersey General Assembly from District 3A
- In office January 9, 1968 – January 8, 1974 Serving with Joseph H. Enos (1968-1971); H. Donald Stewart (1971-1974)
- Preceded by: District created
- Succeeded by: District abolished

Personal details
- Born: December 23, 1932 Swedesboro, New Jersey, U.S.
- Died: January 29, 2019 (aged 86) Wildwood Crest, New Jersey, U.S.
- Party: Republican
- Education: Penns Grove High School; Rutgers University

Kenneth Algernon Black Jr. (December 23, 1932 – January 29, 2019) was an American Republican Party politician who served in the New Jersey General Assembly from District 3A from 1968 to 1974.

Born in Swedesboro, New Jersey and raised in Penns Grove, New Jersey, Black graduated from Penns Grove High School and Rutgers University.

A resident of Wildwood Crest, New Jersey, since 1984, he died there on January 29, 2019, at age 86.
