= Leonard H. Kaser =

American politician (born 1931)

Member of the New Jersey House of Representatives from the 3B district
- In office 1968–1969 Serving with Walter E. Pedersen
- Preceded by: Office created
- Succeeded by: John L. Miller; Thomas J. Shusted

Personal details
- Born: October 9, 1931 Franklinville, New Jersey, US
- Party: Republican
- Education: La Salle University; Georgetown University Law Center
- Profession: Lawyer

Leonard H. Kaser (born October 9, 1931) was an American lawyer and politician who represented the 3rd legislative district in the New Jersey General Assembly from 1968 to 1969 as a Republican.

== Biography ==
Kaser was born on October 9, 1931, in the Franklinville section of Franklin Township, Gloucester County, New Jersey, and graduated from Clayton High School. He received a bachelor's degree from La Salle College (since renamed as La Salle University) and completed his legal education at Georgetown University Law Center. A resident of Williamstown in Monroe Township, he practiced law as a partner at Kaser & Kagan.

In 1967 the 3rd legislative district was redrawn into four sub-districts with Kaser standing for election in seat 3B as a Republican. Kaser would be elected alongside Walter E. Pedersen on the Republican slate with 25.3% of the vote, narrowly ahead of Democrat LeRoy P. Wooster with 25%.

Kaser introduced a bill just days before leaving office that would allow divorce after a couple had been separated for a year, seeking to replace the standing legislation that requires one of the two members of the marriage to have "willfully deserted" the other for two years before a divorce could be granted by the state, which was heavily opposed by the state's Catholic population due to its "no-fault" nature.

Kaser chose not to stand for re-election in 1969, being succeeded by James M. Turner and instead returned to practicing law where he specialized in challenging the state's divorce laws in court.
