= James M. Turner (politician) =

American politician (1928–1981)

Member of the New Jersey General Assembly from Legislative District 3B
- In office January 13, 1970 – January 11, 1972 Serving with Francis J. Gorman
- Preceded by: Leonard H. Kaser and Walter E. Pedersen
- Succeeded by: Kenneth A. Gewertz and Francis J. Gorman

Member of the New Jersey Senate from Legislative District 3A
- In office January 11, 1972 – June 28, 1973
- Preceded by: John L. White
- Succeeded by: District dissolved

Personal details
- Born: November 8, 1928
- Died: July 20, 1981 (aged 52)
- Party: Republican
- Spouse: Cynthia
- Occupation: Private detective

James M. Turner (November 8, 1928 – July 20, 1981) was an American Republican Party politician who served in both houses of the New Jersey Legislature, serving one term in the New Jersey General Assembly from 1970 to 1972, and in the New Jersey Senate from 1972 until he was forced to resign from office in June 1973, after being convicted for his role leading a conspiracy to place drugs in the home of a Democratic Party political rival. Despite being evicted from his seat, Turner ran a quixotic campaign to be elected to a second term in the Senate.

== Public service ==
Before being elected to office in the state legislature, Turner served on the Gloucester County Board of Chosen Freeholders.

=== General Assembly ===
In the 1969 general election, Turner and his Republican running mate Thomas J. Shusted were elected to represent District 3B of the General Assembly, one of four pairs of representatives from the 3rd Legislative District, which was further divided into four Assembly districts (Districts 3A, 3B, 3C, and 3D); District 3B included portions of Camden and Gloucester counties.

=== State Senate ===
In the 1971 general election, Turner ran for Senate in District 3A and won by a margin of 11 votes over Democrat Louis J. Damminger. With Damminger trailing by 40 votes on election day, a recount was demanded which took until late December to certify the final 11-vote margin. The challenges that election officials encountered with the recount was one of the key factors convincing Gloucester County to announce in May 1974 that it was going to switch from paper ballots to a computerized system.

=== First Conviction ===
Turner was removed from the Senate on June 28, 1973, after being convicted for his role in a conspiracy in which a pair of bags filled with 6,500 amphetamine tablets were placed in the home of his Democratic Party rival Kenneth A. Gewertz by Turner's confederates, as part of an effort to destroy Gewertz's political career; with his conviction, Turner was barred from running for office or serving in any state office. Testimony from a Deputy Attorney General during the trial indicated that Turner had pressured him to conduct a police raid on Gewertz's home after bags containing the drug phendimetrazine had been planted in Gewertz's home by one of Turner's co-conspirators; the nature and urgency of the pleas – as well as Turner's certainty that drugs would be found – only raised suspicions and led to the conspiracy unraveling. Turner was sentenced to serve five years in prison.

After his sentencing on the charge of planting drugs on Gewertz, Turner stated that he had no intention of dropping out of the race, saying "I intend to win, and I expect the Senate to seat me", despite the probability that the Senate would deny him the right to serve in office, even if he won the seat. An appeal to a judge to remove Turner from the 1973 Republican Party primary failed and the official party organization ran a campaign to get voters to elect Gloucester County Sheriff Walter Fish through a write-in campaign. Despite his ban on serving in public office and being sentenced to serve five years in prison, Turner won a spot on the November ballot, with 5,545 votes, while Fish received 4,678 and Robert E. Boakes received 3,277 votes. Turner was defeated by Democrat Raymond Zane in the general election, but was still able to garner just over 20% of the vote.

=== Second Conviction ===
Turner was free on bail pending his appeal, which allowed him to run for office. But in August 1973, a grand jury indicted Turner again, this time on bribery charges, alleging that he had accepted $2,000 as part of an effort to use his connections with the state parole board to arrange parole for a prisoner serving a term of up to eight years.
