= Saint James High School (New Jersey) =

Defunct Catholic high school in Salem County, New Jersey, US

Saint James High School was a Roman Catholic high school located in Carneys Point Township, in Salem County, in the U.S. state of New Jersey, that operated under the auspices of the Roman Catholic Diocese of Camden. It closed at the end of the 1999-2000 school year. Colors: Green & Gold; Mascot: Spartans

== History ==
The high school opened in the late 1920s at St. James Church in Penns Grove and a new high school building was later constructed at 350 Georgetown Road in Carneys Point Township.

The school, the last Catholic high school in Salem County, was closed in 2000 by the Diocese of Camden as part of a retrenchment in which two elementary schools in Salem County were also closed. Starting in the 2000-2001 school year, Bishop Guilfoyle Regional Catholic School was created in the former Saint James High School building, to serve elementary school students from across the county. With enrollment declining from the peak of 373 students reach in 2001-02 to the 111 students enrolled in 2008-09 and with an annual deficit of $400,000 per year, the school was closed by the diocese at the end of the 2009-10 school year, ending Catholic education in the county.

== Athletics ==
Baseball The baseball team won the Non-Public C South state championship in 1959, 1961, 1963, 1964 and 1965. The team won the Non-Public B state championship in 1988, using seven runs in the seventh inning to defeat Pope John XXIII Regional High School by a score of 8-2 in the tournament final.

Football The undefeated 1981 football team was awarded the Parochial B South championship as the only school eligible to qualify.

Wrestling The wrestling team won the Parochial B South sectional championship in 1989, 1990 and 1992.

== Notable alumni ==
- H. Donald Stewart (born 1939), politician who served in the New Jersey General Assembly from 1972 to 1982
