= Thomas A. Pankok =

American politician (1931–2022)

Member of the New Jersey General Assembly from the 3rd district
- In office January 12, 1982 – January 14, 1986 Serving with Martin A. Herman
- Preceded by: H. Donald Stewart
- Succeeded by: Jack Collins and Gary Stuhltrager

Personal details
- Born: July 9, 1931 Salem, New Jersey, U.S.
- Died: January 31, 2022 (aged 90) Newark, Delaware, U.S.
- Party: Democratic
- Spouse: Alma Land

Thomas A. Pankok (July 9, 1931 – January 31, 2022) was an American Democratic Party politician who served in the New Jersey General Assembly from 1982 to 1986, where he represented the 3rd Legislative District.

Born on July 9, 1931, in Salem, Pankok graduated from Salem High School in 1950. He served in the United States Navy for four years during the Korean War and was hired by the Bell Telephone Company in 1956, where he was employed for 30 years. He served on the Salem City Council and for 15 years on the Salem County, New Jersey Board of Chosen Freeholders.

Then a resident of Pennsville Township, he was elected to the General Assembly in 1981 together with Martin A. Herman and served two terms in office representing the 3rd Legislative District, which then covered all of Salem County and portions of both Cumberland County and Gloucester County.

A resident of Mannington Township, Pankok spent about ten years as secretary to the board of commissioners of the Delaware River and Bay Authority, a bi-state agency that oversees transportation infrastructure in Delaware and New Jersey.

Pankok died on January 31, 2022, in Newark, Delaware, at the age of 90.

New Jersey General Assembly
Preceded by H. Donald Stewart	Member of the New Jersey General Assembly for the 3rd District; January 1982 - January 1986; With: Martin A. Herman	Succeeded by Jack Collins and Gary Stuhltrager
