= John J. Horn =

American politician (1917–1999)

Commissioner of the New Jersey Department of Labor and Industry
- In office September 1976 (acting) / January 19, 1978 (confirmed) – January 25, 1982
- Preceded by: Joseph A. Hoffman
- Succeeded by: Roger Bodman

Member of the New Jersey Senate from the 5th Legislative District
- In office January 10, 1974 – September 22, 1976
- Preceded by: District created
- Succeeded by: Angelo Errichetti

Member of the New Jersey General Assembly from the Legislative District 3D
- In office January 9, 1968 – January 10, 1974 Serving with Lee B. Laskin and James Florio
- Preceded by: District created
- Succeeded by: District dissolved

Personal details
- Born: November 2, 1917 Camden, New Jersey
- Died: January 6, 1999 (aged 81) Brick Township, New Jersey
- Party: Democratic
- Spouse: Frances P. Hartmann
- Children: 2
- Education: Rutgers University–Camden
- Occupation: Labor leader

John J. Horn (November 2, 1917 – January 6, 1999) was an American labor leader and Democratic Party politician. He served in both houses of the New Jersey Legislature, serving in the New Jersey General Assembly from 1968 to 1974 and in the New Jersey Senate from 1974 to 1976. He was then nominated by Governor of New Jersey Brendan Byrne to join his cabinet as commissioner of the New Jersey Department of Labor and Industry, a position he held from 1976 until 1982.

== Personal life ==
Horn was born in Philadelphia on November 2, 1917. Raised in Camden, he played football at Woodrow Wilson High School and went on to graduate from Rutgers University–Camden. He worked for Ruberoid Company in Camden to help pay for his college education and was named as shop steward based on his ability to build cooperative relations with both workers and company management. In 1971, the United Rubber Workers named him to serve as a regional director for the union.

After leaving office as Labor Commissioner in January 1982 when Thomas Kean took office as governor, Horn headed straight to Newark Airport for a flight to Florida and apparent retirement, having made arrangements to have a representative of his office retrieve his car from the parking lot.

A 20-year resident of Seaside Park, Horn died on January 6, 1999, at Ocean County Medical Center in Brick Township. He was survived by his two daughters, Lori and Sherry. He was predeceased by his wife, Frances (née Hartmann) Horn.

== Public service ==
Horn served on the Board of Education of the Camden City School District for nine years starting in the 1950s, including two years in office as the board's president. He was a member of the Camden City Council in the 1960s.

Horn was elected in 1967 together with Republican Lee B. Laskin to serve in the New Jersey General Assembly to represent Legislative District 3D, one of four pairs of representatives from the 3rd Legislative District, which was further divided into four Assembly districts (Districts 3A, 3B, 3C, and 3D); District 3D included portions of Camden County. In the Assembly, Horn served as assistant minority leader during his first term in the Assembly and was Democratic leader in the 1972-73 session. Horn was re-elected to the Assembly in both 1969 and 1971, each time with Democratic running mate James Florio, who had served Horn as a legislative aide while he was still in law school.

In January 1969, Horn was one of three legislators who had been identified by officials in the office of the New Jersey Attorney General as being "too comfortable with members of organized crime"; Horn refused to comment on the allegations and said that he would demand a public hearing to address the charges. An informant alleged that Horn had met with a mobster and a representative of the county prosecutor's office in an effort to have charges against the mobster's brother dropped. He denied ever having met with the mobster and stated that "I know nothing about organized crime. All this must be a complete fantasy". The assembly's special investigation committee chastised two legislators, but found that there was no evidence to support the claims against Horn and three other elected officials.

Upon the creation of a 40-district legislative map in 1973 in response to the one-man-one-vote system mandated by the 1964 Supreme Court decision in Reynolds v. Sims, the new 5th Legislative District consisted of portions of Camden County, including the city of Camden and its suburbs. Horn was elected to the New Jersey Senate in the new district in the 1973 general election, defeating Republican Richard C. Hardenbergh by a 65%-35% margin, with running mates James Florio and Ernest F. Schuck winning the district's two General Assembly seats. He resigned from office on September 22, 1976, and was succeeded by Angelo Errichetti, who won a November 1976 special election, and was sworn in to take Horn's former Senate seat on November 8, 1976.

Governor Brendan Byrne nominated Horn to succeed Joseph A. Hoffman as head of the Department of Labor and Industry (since renamed as the New Jersey Department of Labor and Workforce Development). He served as commissioner on an acting basis starting in September 1976 and was commissioner from January 19, 1978, until January 25, 1982. In December 1976, acting commissioner Horn advocated on behalf of passage of a proposed Illegal Alien Employment Prohibition Act that was being considered by a committee in the New Jersey Senate under which fines would be imposed on companies that hired undocumented workers; Horn cited data showing that the state had 360,000 people out of work and an unemployment rate of 11.3% that was one of the nation's highest, while an estimate from the federal government's Immigration and Naturalization Service found that the state had 200,000 undocumented workers, and he stated that "the estimated number of illegal aliens holding jobs represent more than half of our total unemployed". Governor Byrne also supported the bill, saying that "must take every step possible to eliminate this situation that in the end, not one single worker in New Jersey is being deprived of employment by an illegal alien illegally holding a job".

After leaving his office in the executive branch, Horn worked as a lobbyist in the 1980s and was named to the Mid-Atlantic Fishing Commission in 1989 by President Bill Clinton.
