= New Jersey Department of Agriculture =

State agency of New Jersey, United States

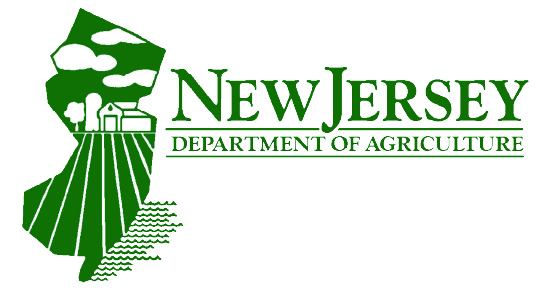
- Logo of the NJDA

Department overview
- Formed: March 29, 1916; 110 years ago
- Jurisdiction: Government of New Jersey
- Headquarters: 200 Riverview Plaza 3rd Floor Trenton, New Jersey 08611
- Annual budget: US$1.3 billion (FY2027) (90% federal)
- Department executive: Ed Wengryn, Secretary
- Website: nj.gov/agriculture

The New Jersey Department of Agriculture (NJDA) is a state governmental agency that is responsible for the promotion and protection of agriculture and agribusiness in the state of New Jersey. The department oversees school meal programs, distributes surplus food from federal programs, oversees soil and water resources, maintains farmland for agricultural uses, assists in development of overseas markets for New Jersey products from its farms and fisheries, and administers agricultural education programs.

Ed Wengryn was named New Jersey secretary of agriculture in March 2024.

== Organization ==
The department is jointly managed by the secretary of agriculture and the State Board of Agriculture. The secretary is responsible for managing and directing the work of the department. In addition, the secretary is the department’s executive officer, serves as secretary to the State Board of Agriculture and is a member of the governor's cabinet. The secretary is appointed by the State Board of Agriculture and is approved by the governor. New Jersey is the only state in the nation where the farmer constituents of the Department of Agriculture set policy and actively manage the department and select its secretary.

The State Board of Agriculture, an eight-member body created by statute in 1887, serves as the policy-making and general head of the department. The board is charged with setting policies which direct the secretary and the department in carrying out its duties and responsibilities. Each member serves a four-year term, with two members replaced annually by new members elected at the State Agricultural Convention and appointed by the governor with the approval of the State Senate. By law, at least four of the members must represent the top four commodity groups in the state based on a two-year average of the gross value of production.

- State Board of Agriculture
- Secretary of Agriculture
  - Office of the Secretary
  - Agricultural and Natural Resources Division
  - Animal Health Division
  - Food and Nutrition Division
  - Marketing and Development Division
  - Plant Industry Division

== Agricultural Education ==
Also found at the New Jersey Department of Agriculture is the Agricultural Education Division, led by Mrs. Nancy Trivette. The division oversees all agricultural education programs in New Jersey, as well as leading the New Jersey FFA Association. There are currently over 3,500 FFA members in the state of New Jersey spanning across 37 chapters.

== Commodities Councils ==
The Division works closely with seven commodity councils to help them publicize their products and bring the benefits of grower-sponsored research to consumers. The funds are used by each council for product research and improvement, promotional point-of-purchase materials and special promotional events. These councils are funded by taxes levied on farmers, growers, and producers based on the quantity of goods produced. Grower-funded commodity councils have been established for apples, blueberries, milk, poultry, sweet potatoes, white potatoes, and wine. These include:

- New Jersey Apple Industry Advisory Council
- New Jersey Dairy Industry Advisory Council
- New Jersey Poultry Products Promotion Council
- New Jersey Wine Industry Advisory Council

== List of Secretaries ==
Democratic Republican

New Jersey secretaries of agriculture
No.	Name	Took office	Left office	Governor
1.	Alva Agee	1916	1925	James Fielder
1.	Alva Agee	1916	1925	Walter Evans Edge
1.	Alva Agee	1916	1925	William Nelson Runyan
1.	Alva Agee	1916	1925	Clarence E. Case
1.	Alva Agee	1916	1925	Edward I. Edwards
1.	Alva Agee	1916	1925	George Sebastian Silzer
2.	William Duryee	1925	1938	George Sebastian Silzer
2.	William Duryee	1925	1938	A. Harry Moore
2.	William Duryee	1925	1938	Morgan Foster Larson
2.	William Duryee	1925	1938	A. Harry Moore
2.	William Duryee	1925	1938	Clifford Ross Powell
2.	William Duryee	1925	1938	Horace Griggs Prall
2.	William Duryee	1925	1938	Harold G. Hoffman
3.	Willard H. Allen	1938	1956	A. Harry Moore
3.	Willard H. Allen	1938	1956	Charles Eddison
3.	Willard H. Allen	1938	1956	Walter Evans Edge
3.	Willard H. Allen	1938	1956	Alfred E. Driscoll
3.	Willard H. Allen	1938	1956	Robert B. Meyner
4.	Philip Alampi	1956	1982	Robert B. Meyner
4.	Philip Alampi	1956	1982	Richard J. Hughes
4.	Philip Alampi	1956	1982	William T. Cahill
4.	Philip Alampi	1956	1982	Brendan Byrne
5.	Arthur R. Brown Jr.	1982	2002	Thomas Kean
5.	Arthur R. Brown Jr.	1982	2002	James Florio
5.	Arthur R. Brown Jr.	1982	2002	Christine Todd Whitman
5.	Arthur R. Brown Jr.	1982	2002	Donald DiFrancesco
6.	Charles M. Kuperus	2002	2008	John Farmer Jr.
6.	Charles M. Kuperus	2002	2008	John O. Bennett
6.	Charles M. Kuperus	2002	2008	Richard Codey
6.	Charles M. Kuperus	2002	2008	Jim McGreevey
6.	Charles M. Kuperus	2002	2008	Richard Codey
6.	Charles M. Kuperus	2002	2008	Jon Corzine
7.	Douglas H. Fisher	2008	2023	Jon Corzine
7.	Douglas H. Fisher	2008	2023	Chris Christie
7.	Douglas H. Fisher	2008	2023	Phil Murphy
	Joe Atchison III (Interim Secretary)	2023	2024	Phil Murphy
8.	Edward D. Wengryn (Acting Secretary)	2024	Incumbent	Phil Murphy

== Related legislation ==
- 1916: Act of March 29, 1916, P.L. 1916, c. 268
- 1948: Department of Agriculture Act of 1948, P.L. 1948, c. 447
