= Douglas H. Fisher =

American politician

Secretary of Agriculture of New Jersey
- In office February 10, 2009 – July 1, 2023
- Governor: Jon Corzine; Chris Christie; Phil Murphy
- Preceded by: Charles M. Kuperus
- Succeeded by: Joe Atchinson III

Member of the New Jersey General Assembly from the 3rd district
- In office January 8, 2002 – March 9, 2009 Serving with John J. Burzichelli
- Preceded by: Jack Collins
- Succeeded by: Celeste Riley

Personal details
- Born: April 28, 1947 (age 79) Bridgeton, New Jersey
- Party: Democratic

Douglas H. Fisher (born April 28, 1947) is an American Democratic Party politician who has served as the New Jersey Secretary of Agriculture, having been initially confirmed by Governor Jon Corzine and carried over by both Chris Christie and Phil Murphy. He served in the New Jersey General Assembly from 2002 to 2009, representing the 3rd legislative district.

== Education ==
Fisher graduated with a B.S. Business Administration from Bryant University in Rhode Island.

== Career ==
=== Early career ===
Fisher served on the South Jersey Economic Development District from 1995-2001 and the South Jersey Transportation Planning Organization, also from 1995-2001. Fisher served on the Cumberland County Board of Chosen Freeholders from 1996-2000, and was President of the South Jersey Freeholder Association in 1999. He served on the Bridgeton City Council from 1990-1992. Fisher is the former President of the Bridgeton Historical and Cultural Commission. Fisher served in the New Jersey National Guard from 1969-1975.

=== General Assembly ===
Fisher served in the Assembly on the Agriculture and Natural Resources (as Chair), the Regulated Professions Committee, Budget, the Telecommunications and Utilities Committee and the Intergovernmental Relations Commission.

=== New Jersey Secretary of Agriculture ===
The New Jersey Board of Agriculture voted in February 2009 to nominate Fisher for the position of New Jersey Secretary of Agriculture, 6-2. Governor Jon S. Corzine confirmed the nomination and Fisher was sworn in on March 7, 2009. Fisher served as chair of the New Jersey state soil conservation committee and was a member of the State Planning Committee from 2009-2023. He was also past Present President of The Northeast State Departments of Agriculture and Past treasurer and Vice-President of the National Associations of Departments of Agriculture(NSADA)He additionally serves as President of Food Export Northeast. Mr Fisher was Chairman of The State Soil Conservation Committee. Fisher retained the role during the governorship of Chris Christie and was also chosen by incoming governor Phil Murphy to continue in the position; the position of Agriculture Secretary.
