= Horace J. Bryant =

American politician

Horace J. Bryant, Jr. (June 29, 1909 – April 13, 1983) was an African American civil rights activist, banking commissioner, and politician from New Jersey. As Commissioner of Banking and Insurance under Governor Richard J. Hughes, he was the first African American to serve in a State Cabinet position in the New Jersey government.

== Early life and career ==
Bryant was born and raised in the predominantly African American community of Lawnside, New Jersey. He was the son of Horace J. Bryant, Sr., a onetime carpenter who succeeded as a builder and real estate developer. His father also served as the New Jersey General Assembly's first African American calendar clerk, responsible for billing and scheduling.

He earned a bachelor's degree in accounting from Temple University in 1929. In 1930, he joined state service as a junior bank examiner in the New Jersey Department of Banking and Insurance.

== Political career ==
In 1939, Bryant moved to Atlantic City and became involved in local Republican Party politics. He ran for local office in Atlantic City in 1948, the first African American to do so, and again in 1952. He was unsuccessful in both races, having been frozen out by Atlantic County political boss Frank S. Farley.

Bryant then joined the Democratic Party and became active at the local and state levels. He was a life member of the NAACP and spoke out on civil rights issues in Atlantic City. He led efforts to integrate Atlantic City's movie theatres in the 1950s, and he founded the Northside Union League Federal Credit Union, the city's first African American financial institution.

Bryant worked his way up in the state Department of Banking and Insurance, becoming deputy commissioner in 1965. In 1969, he was appointed commissioner by Governor Richard J. Hughes, becoming the first African American to hold a cabinet-level position in New Jersey.

He retired from state office in 1970 at the end of the Hughes administration and returned to Atlantic City. In 1972, he was elected to the Atlantic City Commission, and he served as City Commissioner of Revenue and Finance until 1980. He also founded the Atlantic City Municipal Utilities Authority.

Bryant and his wife Lillian Weekes had a daughter also named Lillian, who served on the Atlantic County Board of Chosen Freeholders from 1975 to 1990. He was the uncle of Wayne R. Bryant, who served in the New Jersey General Assembly and State Senate before his conviction on corruption charges, and Mark Bryant, who served as mayor of Lawnside, New Jersey.

He died in 1983 at a nursing home in Linwood, New Jersey at the age of 73. Horace J. Bryant Drive in Atlantic City is named after him. A bronze bust of Bryant, celebrating his achievements as a civil rights pioneer, sits in the Carnegie Library Center in Stockton University.
