= Eugene Raymond III =

American politician

Member of the New Jersey General Assembly from District 3C
- In office January 9, 1968 – January 8, 1974
- Preceded by: District created
- Succeeded by: District abolished

Personal details
- Born: March 16, 1916 Philadelphia, Pennsylvania
- Died: June 17, 2014 (aged 98) Pennsauken Township, New Jersey
- Party: Republican

Eugene Raymond III (March 16, 1916 – June 17, 2014) was an American politician who served in the New Jersey General Assembly from 1968 to 1974.

He died on June 17, 2014, at age 98.
