= James Florio =

American politician (1937–2022)

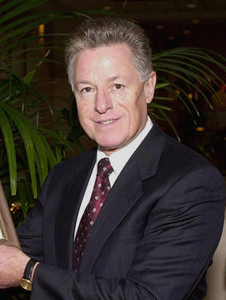

49th Governor of New Jersey
- In office January 16, 1990 – January 18, 1994
- Preceded by: Thomas Kean
- Succeeded by: Christine Todd Whitman

Member of the U.S. House of Representatives from New Jersey's 1st district
- In office January 3, 1975 – January 16, 1990
- Preceded by: John E. Hunt
- Succeeded by: Rob Andrews

Member of the New Jersey General Assembly
- In office January 13, 1970 – January 3, 1975 Serving with John J. Horn (1970–1974), Ernest F. Schuck (1974–1975)
- Preceded by: Lee B. Laskin
- Succeeded by: Ronald Casella
- Constituency: 3rd district (1970–1974); 5th district (1974–1975)

Personal details
- Born: James Joseph Florio; August 29, 1937 New York City, New York, U.S.
- Died: September 25, 2022 (aged 85) Voorhees, New Jersey, U.S.
- Party: Democratic
- Spouses: Maryanne Spaeth (m. 1960; div. 1985) Lucinda Coleman (m. 1988)
- Children: 3
- Education: Trenton State College (BA); Columbia University; Rutgers University, Camden (JD)

Military service
- Branch/service: United States Navy
- Years of service: 1955–1975
- Rank: Lieutenant commander

James Joseph Florio (August 29, 1937 – September 25, 2022) was an American lawyer and politician who served as the 49th governor of New Jersey from 1990 to 1994. He was previously the U.S. representative for New Jersey's 1st congressional district from 1975 to 1990 and served in the New Jersey General Assembly from 1970 to 1975. He was a member of the Democratic Party.

== Early life and education ==
Florio was born in Brooklyn, New York, on August 29, 1937. Florio was one of three children (all sons) born to Lillian Ellen (née Hazell) Florio (June 18, 1917 – May 2, 2000) and Vincenzo [later Vincent Joseph] Florio (May 12, 1914 – April 7, 1994), who wed in 1936. Florio and his brothers were raised in Brooklyn. His father was of Italian descent and his mother was of Scottish, Irish, and German descent. Florio's father was a shipyard painter who also used his poker winnings to help support his family. Florio attended Erasmus Hall High School in Flatbush. He dropped out of high school following his junior year, joined the U.S. Navy, became a weatherman, and earned a high school equivalency degree.

Florio received a Bachelor of Arts in social studies from Trenton State College in 1962 and started graduate studies in public law and government at Columbia University on a Woodrow Wilson Fellowship before earning a Juris Doctor from Rutgers School of Law–Camden in 1967.

== Career ==
After graduating from law school, Florio volunteered to work for the Democratic Party and was mentored by past Camden Mayor Angelo Errichetti. Florio was an amateur boxer. He served as an enlisted member of the United States Navy from 1955 to 1958 and continued to serve in the United States Naval Reserve as a commissioned officer until 1975, ultimately achieving the rank of lieutenant commander. After being admitted to the bar, he became the assistant city attorney for the City of Camden, a position he would hold until 1971. He was the borough solicitor for the New Jersey towns of Runnemede, Woodlynne, and Somerdale from 1969 to 1974.

=== New Jersey General Assembly ===
In both 1969 and 1971, Florio was elected to represent the 3rd Legislative District in the New Jersey General Assembly, covering portions of Camden County, each time with Democratic running mate John J. Horn, whom Florio had served as a legislative aide while he was still in law school. He was elected in 1973, together with Ernest F. Schuck, to represent the 5th Legislative District in the General Assembly, which covered portions of Camden County and Gloucester County. In 1975, Florio resigned after being elected to the U.S House of Representatives.

=== U.S. Representative ===
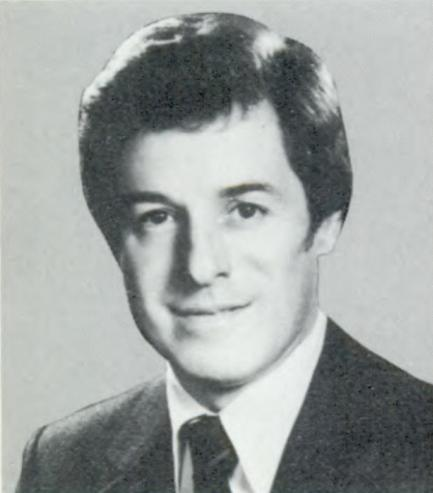
Florio's congressional portrait, 1983

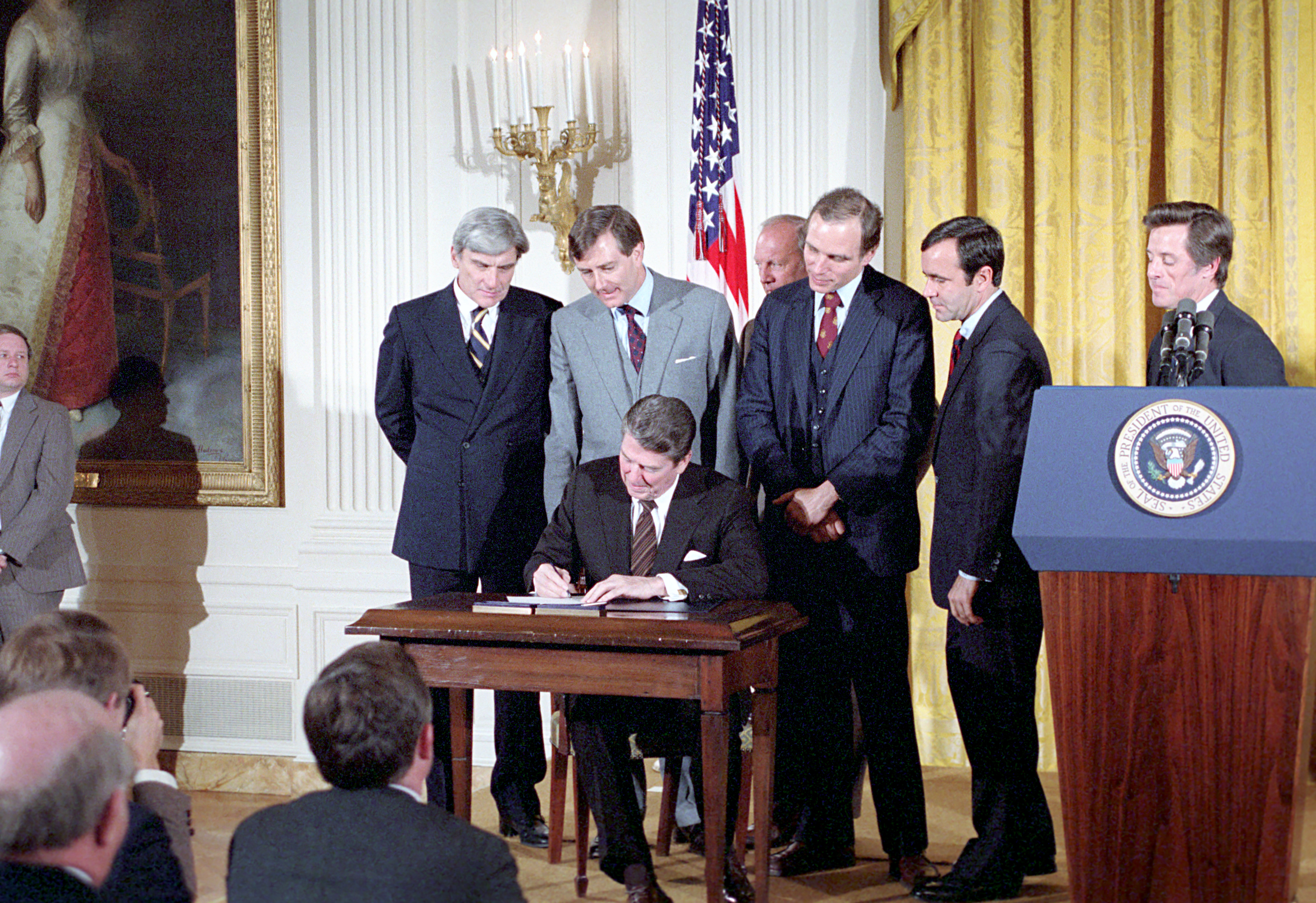
Florio at the White House with President Ronald Reagan in 1984

In November 1974, Florio was elected to the United States House of Representatives from New Jersey's 1st congressional district, defeating incumbent John E. Hunt. He served in the House from January 3, 1975, until January 16, 1990, when he resigned to serve as governor of New Jersey.

In Congress, Florio authored the Superfund legislation to clean up the most polluted sites in the country in 1980. He was the author of the Railroad Deregulation Law which saved the nation's freight railroads, including Conrail. He was also cosponsor of the Exon-Florio Amendment, which created the Treasury Department's Committee on Foreign Investment in the United States. This legislation was a factor in the Dubai Ports World controversy in 2006. As Congressman, Florio was a key supporter in gaining federal funds to refurbish rail tracks and stations along what would become the Atlantic City Line. This saw Amtrak service to Atlantic City begin in 1989, and NJTransit service across South Jersey in 1990.

=== Unsuccessful gubernatorial candidacies ===
While in Congress, Florio ran for Governor of New Jersey in 1977, 1981, and 1989. Florio was defeated by incumbent Democrat Brendan Byrne in 1977. In 1981, he won the Democratic nomination, but then lost a controversial general election to Thomas Kean. The involvement of the Republican National Committee in the 1981 general election received significant subsequent attention, with the RNC accused of having created a Ballot Security Task Force made up of off-duty police officers to engage in voter suppression. The 1981 gubernatorial general election was the closest in New Jersey history, and the outcome of the election was not decided with certainty until several weeks after Election Day.

=== Governorship ===
In the 1989 New Jersey gubernatorial election, Florio won both the nomination and the general election. During his campaign, Florio said: "You can write this statement down: 'Florio feels there is no need for new taxes'". Florio defeated Republican Jim Courter with 61% of the vote, becoming the first American of Italian descent to become Governor of New Jersey.

Florio took office during the late 1980s recession and thus faced a budget deficit. Also, Florio wished to increase education aid to New Jersey's low-wealth school districts. Faced with a projected 1991 deficit of $3 billion, Florio asked for a $2.8 billion tax increase, most in the way of a sales tax increase and an increase in the state excise taxes on various goods. Florio signed the tax package into law in June 1990. It was the largest state tax increase in the history of the United States. The money generated balanced the budget, increased property tax relief programs, and increased education spending in the Abbott districts. Florio also eliminated 1,500 government jobs and cut perks for state officials.

Florio redistributed hundreds of millions of dollars of school aid away from suburban districts to urban districts (see the Abbott case) and rural districts. Under Florio's plan, known as the Quality Education Act, 151 suburban districts would lose almost all of their education funding and have to assume pension costs, Social Security payments, and retiree health costs; another 71 districts would have large reductions in aid and have to assume smaller portions of retiree benefits; and about 350 districts would see increases in aid. The aid cuts fell the most heavily in North Jersey.

A grassroots taxpayer revolt sprouted in 1990, spearheaded by a citizens' group named "Hands Across New Jersey" founded by John Budzash, a postal worker from Howell Township. Budzash was a frequent guest on radio and television shows throughout New Jersey, New York, and Pennsylvania speaking out against the new taxes. Florio was a regular topic on active anti-tax broadcasting from talk radio stations New Jersey 101.5 to Curtis Sliwa's AM radio talk show and Bob Grant's AM radio talk show, both based in New York City. Sliwa, Grant, and John and Ken from New Jersey 101.5, along with Alan Keyes (who in later years was a presidential candidate in the Republican primary), were guest speakers at two rallies held by Hands Across New Jersey protesting both George H. W. Bush and Florio's tax increases. Bumper stickers with "Impeach Florio" were seen around the state.

Prior to the 1991 New Jersey elections, Democrats held majorities in both the New Jersey General Assembly and the New Jersey State Senate. But voter anger was so great that after the 1991 election, Republicans were to win veto-proof majorities in both houses. An example of Republican strength at this time was their promise to roll back the sales tax, which was raised by one percentage point during the first two years of the Florio administration. The rollback was passed in both houses, only to be vetoed by Florio. Republicans then overrode Florio's veto and the rollback was passed.

In order to pay for the increased aid in rural and urban districts and maintain suburban school aid, Florio and the legislature passed the "Pension Reevaluation Act". The Pension Reevaluation Act changed the actuarial calculations used to calculate the State's pension contributions; instead of using the book value of pension assets (a conservative approach), the state would use a market-related value. The Act also increased the assumed rate of return for investments from 7 percent to 8.75 percent. The Pension Reevaluation Act reduced New Jersey's pension contributions by $1.5 billion in 1992.

Florio also signed a 20% reduction of auto insurance premiums. In May 1990, Florio enacted the stiffest laws in the U.S. on owning or selling semi-automatic firearms; in 1993, he vetoed a repeal bill passed by the Republican-led legislature. The National Rifle Association lobbied hard to override the governor's veto, and the Assembly voted to override it. However, the Senate voted unanimously to uphold Florio's veto. According to Time, New Jerseyans had swamped lawmakers' offices with calls supporting the ban after Florio stumped the state, appealing to voters to voice their feelings" about semi-automatic firearms.

==== 1993 election ====
In 1991, the Democrats lost their majority in both chambers of the state legislature, for the first time in 20 years (Republicans controlled the state assembly after the 1985 and 1987 elections). The governor's approval ratings were as low as 18% but stabilized to roughly 50% by 1993. He made an effort for conservative support by putting in place tighter restrictions on welfare payments to mothers and enjoyed the strong support of President Bill Clinton. Clinton advisers James Carville and Paul Begala worked on his campaign. One campaign slogan against the governor was "Florio-free in '93." Due in large part to the tax hikes, Florio lost his bid for re-election to Republican Somerset County freeholder Christine Todd Whitman and became the first Democratic governor since the adoption of the state's current constitution in 1947 to lose a re-election vote. (Republican William T. Cahill, elected in 1969, became the first governor to lose reelection when he was defeated in the Republican primary in 1973.) Whitman prevailed by a narrow margin of 26,093 votes out of 2,505,964 votes cast. Florio was the last politician from South Jersey to win statewide office until Andy Kim was elected to the U.S. Senate in 2024.

=== Cabinet and administration ===
The Florio Cabinet
Office	Name	Term
Governor	James Florio	January 16, 1990 – January 18, 1994
Secretary of Agriculture	Arthur R. Brown Jr.	July 1, 1982 – January 15, 2002
Attorney General	Robert Del Tufo	January 16, 1990 – August 24, 1993
Frederick P. DeVesa	August 25, 1993 – January 18, 1994
Commissioner of Banking	Robert M. Jaworski	January 16, 1990 – April 9, 1990
Geoffrey M. Connor	April 9, 1990 – January 18, 1994
Commissioner of Commerce and Economic Development	George M. Zoffinger	March 14, 1990 – December 13, 1991
Barbara McConnell	December 13, 1991 – January 18, 1994
Commissioner of Community Affairs	Randy Primas	January 18, 1990 – September 18, 1992
Stephanie R. Bush	September 22, 1992 – January 18, 1994
Commissioner of Corrections	William H. Fauver	June 15, 1978 – December 31, 1997
Commissioner of Education	Saul Cooperman	July 7, 1982 – June 30, 1990
John Ellis	July 3, 1990 – December 31, 1992
Mary Lee Fitzgerald	January 4, 1993 – January 18, 1994
Commissioner of Environmental Protection	Judith A. Yaskin	January 18, 1990 – February 15, 1991
Scott A. Weiner	February 15, 1991 – July 31, 1993
Jeanne Fox	August 1, 1993 – January 18, 1994
Commissioner of Health	Frances J. Dunston	April 2, 1990 – October 15, 1992
Bruce Siegel	October 16, 1992 – January 18, 1994
Chancellor of Higher Education	T. Edward Hollinder	August 9, 1977 – June 30, 1990
Edward D. Goldberg	July 1, 1990 – June 30, 1994
Commissioner of Human Services	William Waldman	September 8, 1989 – March 26, 1990
Alan J. Gibbs	March 26, 1990 – November 30, 1992
William Waldman	December 1, 1992 – June 30, 1998
Commissioner of Insurance	Jasper J. Jackson	January 16, 1990 – April 9, 1990
Samuel F. Fortunato	April 9, 1990 – July 6, 1994
Commissioner of Labor and Workforce; Development	Raymond L. Bramucci	January 17, 1990 – January 18, 1994
Adjutant General	Major General Francis R. Gerard	February 10, 1982 – April 9, 1990
Major General Vito Morgano	April 9, 1990 – April 4, 1994
Personnel Commissioner	Andrew Weber	January 18, 1990 – October 12, 1990
William G. Scheuer	October 12, 1990 – January 15, 1992
Anthony J. Cimino	January 15, 1992 – January 18, 1994
Public Advocate	Thomas S. Smith	January 16, 1990 – April 9, 1990 (acting)
Wilfredo Caraballo	April 9, 1990 – July 31, 1992
Zulima Farber	August 18, 1992 – January 18, 1994
Secretary of State	Joan M. Haberle	January 16, 1990 – January 31, 1992
Daniel Dalton	January 31, 1992 – January 18, 1994
Commissioner of Transportation	Robert A. Innocenzi	July 7, 1989 – March 26, 1990 (acting)
Thomas M. Downs	March 26, 1990 – December 6, 1993
Kathy A. Stanwick	December 7, 1993 – December 31, 1993 (acting)
State Treasurer	Douglas C. Berman	January 18, 1990 – January 10, 1992
Samuel F. Crane	January 10, 1992 – January 18, 1994

=== Post-governorship ===
In 2000, Florio ran for the Democratic nomination for the United States Senate seat that was being vacated by Frank Lautenberg. His opponent was businessman Jon Corzine, former chairman and CEO of Goldman Sachs. In the most expensive Senate primary in history to that point, Corzine won with 246,472 votes, or 58%, while Florio had 179,059 votes, or 42%.

Florio served as the chairman of the New Jersey Pinelands Commission from November 2002 to June 2005. As a congressman in the late 1970s, he was instrumental in shaping the legislation that established the New Jersey Pinelands National Reserve. He was a critic of the George W. Bush administration and the Iraq War. In a letter to the editor of The New York Times, he made a connection between the war and Bush's energy policy saying, "the nation's right to know has never been more important".

Florio supported Hillary Clinton in the 2008 Democratic primaries for president.

Florio served on the board of directors of Trump Entertainment Resorts until he and other board members were forced to resign following the company's entry into its third bankruptcy. He also served on the board of Plymouth Financial Company, Inc. He was a founding partner and of counsel to the law firm of Florio, Perrucci, Steinhardt, Cappelli, Tipton & Taylor.

Florio taught at the Edward J. Bloustein School of Planning and Public Policy at Rutgers University.

== Personal life ==
Florio was married twice. His first marriage to Maryanne Spaeth ended in divorce. In 1984, Florio met his second wife, Lucinda Coleman, a school teacher, while both were living in the same apartment complex in Pine Hill, New Jersey. Jim and Lucinda Florio married on Valentine's Day in 1988, and remained together until his death in September 2022. Jim Florio had three children from his first marriage - Chris, Gregory, and Catherine - while Lucinda Florio also had one son from her first marriage, Mark Rowe.

== Death ==
Florio died on September 25, 2022, from heart failure at a hospital in Voorhees, New Jersey, at age 85. He is buried in Arlington National Cemetery in Arlington County, Virginia. His wife, former New Jersey First Lady Lucinda Florio, died on November 16, 2022, just 52 days later.

== Honors ==
In 1993, Florio was awarded the John F. Kennedy Profile in Courage Award, for his support for gun control. In 2014, he was inducted into the New Jersey Hall of Fame. The Camden County Board of Chosen Freeholders named the Governor James J. Florio Center for Public Service, a primary county administrative building, in Florio's honor in 2017.

New Jersey General Assembly
Preceded by Lee B. Laskin	Member of the New Jersey General Assembly from the 3D district 1970–1974; Served alongside: John J. Horn	Succeeded by Constituency abolished
New constituency	Member of the New Jersey General Assembly from the 5th district 1974–1975; Served alongside: Ernest F. Schuck	Succeeded by Ronald Casella
U.S. House of Representatives
Preceded by John E. Hunt	Member of the U.S. House of Representatives from New Jersey's 1st congressional district 1975–1990	Succeeded by Rob Andrews
Party political offices
Preceded by Brendan Byrne	Democratic nominee for Governor of New Jersey; 1981	Succeeded by Peter Shapiro
Preceded by Peter Shapiro	Democratic nominee for Governor of New Jersey; 1989, 1993	Succeeded by Jim McGreevey
Political offices
Preceded by Thomas Kean	Governor of New Jersey; 1990–1994	Succeeded by Christine Todd Whitman
