= Martin A. Herman =

American politician (born 1939)

Member of the New Jersey General Assembly from the 3rd Legislative District
- In office January 8, 1974 – January 7, 1986 Serving with H. Donald Stewart and Thomas A. Pankok
- Preceded by: Newly created
- Succeeded by: Jack Collins and Gary Stuhltrager

Judge of New Jersey Superior Court
- In office October 1986 – June 30, 2019
- Preceded by: Sidney Granite

Personal details
- Born: June 30, 1939 (age 87) Philadelphia, Pennsylvania, U.S.
- Party: Democratic
- Children: 2

Martin A. Herman (born June 30, 1939) is an American Democratic Party politician who served in the New Jersey General Assembly, where he represented the 3rd Legislative District from 1974 to 1986, and was later appointed as a judge in New Jersey Superior Court in Gloucester County.

== Personal life ==
Born in Philadelphia on June 30, 1939, Herman graduated from the Temple University Beasley School of Law in 1963 after receiving an undergraduate degree at Temple in 1960. After entering private practice, he became the solicitor of Deptford Township, New Jersey in 1969, and served as the secretary to the Gloucester County Bar Association.

Herman had been a partner at the firm of Herman, Pearson & Crass in Woodbury for 18 years, and ended his legal practice in 1986 after being appointed as a judge.

== Public service ==
A resident of West Deptford Township, Herman and his Democratic running mate H. Donald Stewart were elected to represent the 3rd Legislative District in the New Jersey General Assembly in 1973, the first election in which the 40-district legislature was established under the terms of the 1964 U.S. Supreme Court decision in Reynolds v. Sims, which required the populations of legislative districts to be as equal as possible. In the Assembly, Herman served two terms as an assistant majority leader, as chairman of both the Legislative Oversight Committee and the Judiciary, Law, Public Safety and Defense Committee, as vice chairman of the Joint Commission on Economy and Efficiency in Government, and headed the Judiciary Committee Task Force on Juvenile Justice.

In 1976, Herman sponsored legislation allowing the substitution by pharmacists of generic drugs for their brand-name equivalents and permitting price-based advertising for medications, proposals that were opposed by the pharmaceutical industry, many of whose largest companies were based in New Jersey and brought in $2 billion in revenue a year to the state. Martin cited the opportunities to offer New Jersey residents "high quality drugs at lower cost", with savings estimated up to $15 million annually; while opponents argued that reduced profit margins could lead pharmaceutical firms to cut research and cause drug companies to leave the state.

Herman endorsed a 1977 bill defining obscenity and allowing municipalities greater control in regulating and prohibiting pornography, arguing that the only way to allow communities to bring in "legitimate businesses" is if they have the power to ban those businesses specializing in pornography.

Herman was the primary sponsor of a series of bills signed into law by Governor Kean in July 1982 relating to juvenile offenders that included proposals to allow offenders between 14 and 18 years old to be tried as adults and that established a separate Family Court system to address offenses by juveniles. In the November 1983 general election, voters passed a referendum question allowing judges to be transferred to serve in the Family Court section.

Herman was reelected in 1975, 1977 and 1979 with H. Donald Stewart, and in 1981 and 1983 with Thomas A. Pankok in the 3rd District, which included all of Salem County and most of Gloucester County from 1973 until the 1979 elections, and from 1981 forward included all of Salem County and portions of both Cumberland County and Gloucester County. In the 1985 general election, Herman and Pankok lost to Republicans Jack Collins and Gary Stuhltrager by margins of 2,000 votes, as the victors rode the coattails of Governor of New Jersey Thomas Kean's strong election victory that gave the Republicans control of the General Assembly for the first time in more than a decade.

A resident of the Mickelton section of East Greenwich Township, Herman was nominated by Governor Kean in October 1986 to serve as a Judge of the New Jersey Superior Court in Gloucester County, succeeding Sidney Granite as one of the nine judges serving in the county. Samuel G. DeSimone, the county's Assignment Judge, designated Herman for service in Family Court, "since he wrote the book on it." He was required to retire from regular service in 2004, when he turned 65. However, judges in New Jersey are allowed to keep working after their official retirements by agreeing to "recall" appointments, and Herman continued to do so until reaching a mandatory retirement on his 80th birthday.
