= Deptford Township Schools =

School district in Gloucester County, New Jersey, US

Address
- 890 Bankbridge Road Sewell, Gloucester County, New Jersey, 08080; United States
- Coordinates: 39.808488°N 75.092322°W

District information
- Grades: PreK-12
- Superintendent: Kevin Kanauss
- Business administrator: Ron Latham
- Schools: 8

Students and staff
- Enrollment: 3,942 (as of 2020–21)
- Faculty: 329.8 FTEs
- Student–teacher ratio: 12.0:1

Other information
- District Factor Group: CD
- Website: www.deptfordschools.org
| Ind. | Per pupil | District spending | Rank (*) | K-12 average | %± vs. average |
|---|---|---|---|---|---|
| 1A | Total Spending | $15,396 | 6 | $18,891 | −18.5% |
| 1 | Budgetary Cost | 12,750 | 18 | 14,783 | −13.8% |
| 2 | Classroom Instruction | 7,769 | 15 | 8,763 | −11.3% |
| 6 | Support Services | 1,690 | 14 | 2,392 | −29.3% |
| 8 | Administrative Cost | 1,409 | 45 | 1,485 | −5.1% |
| 10 | Operations & Maintenance | 1,564 | 44 | 1,783 | −12.3% |
| 13 | Extracurricular Activities | 149 | 14 | 268 | −44.4% |
| 16 | Median Teacher Salary | 58,521 | 20 | 64,043 |
Data from NJDoE 2014 Taxpayers' Guide to Education Spending. *Of K-12 districts with more than 3,500 students. Lowest spending=1; Highest=103

The Deptford Township Schools is a comprehensive community public school district, comprising eight school facilities, that serves students in pre-kindergarten through twelfth grade in Deptford Township, in Gloucester County, in the U.S. state of New Jersey.

As of the 2020–21 school year, the district, comprising eight schools, had an enrollment of 3,942 students and 329.8 classroom teachers (on an FTE basis), for a student–teacher ratio of 12.0:1.

The district participates in the Interdistrict Public School Choice Program, which allows non-resident students to attend school in the district at no cost to their parents, with tuition covered by the resident district. Available slots are announced annually by grade.

The district had been classified by the New Jersey Department of Education as being in District Factor Group "CD", the sixth-highest of eight groupings. District Factor Groups organize districts statewide to allow comparison by common socioeconomic characteristics of the local districts. From lowest socioeconomic status to highest, the categories are A, B, CD, DE, FG, GH, I and J.

== Schools ==
Schools in the district (with 2020–21 enrollment data from the National Center for Education Statistics) are:

Early childhood

- Central Early Childhood Center with 489 PreK students
  - Shelli Jones, principal
- Pine Acres Early Childhood Center with 240 kindergarten students
  - Reminka Williams, principal

Elementary schools

- Good Intent School with 334 students in grades 1-5
  - Jason Strouse, principal
- Lake Tract School with 382 students in grades 1-5
  - Danielle Lehman, principal
- Oak Valley School with 354 students in grades 1-5
  - Robert Rambo, principal
- Shady Lane School with 361 students in grades 1-5
  - John Merulla, principal

Middle school

- Deptford Township Middle School with 704 students in grades 6-8
  - John Schilling, principal

High school

- Deptford Township High School with 1,009 students in grades 9-12
  - Jonathan Maxson, principal

Special education

- Deptford Transitional Learning Academy which helps students with developmental or cognitive disabilities ages 14 to 21 learn life and career skills.
  - Michael Nicely, principal

== Administration ==
Core members of the district's administration are:

- Kevin Kanauss, superintendent
- Ron Latham, business administrator and board secretary

== Board of education ==
The district's board of education is composed of nine members who set policy and oversee the operation of the district by its administration. As a Type II school district, the members are directly elected by voters to three-year terms of office on a staggered basis, so that three seats are up for election each year held as part of the November general election since 2012. The board appoints a superintendent to oversee the district's day-to-day operations and a business administrator to supervise the business functions of the district.
