= Jack Collins (politician) =

American politician (born 1943)

Speaker of the New Jersey General Assembly
- In office January 9, 1996 – January 8, 2002
- Preceded by: Chuck Haytaian
- Succeeded by: Albio Sires

Member of the New Jersey General Assembly from the 3rd district
- In office January 14, 1986 – January 8, 2002 Serving with Gary Stuhltrager
- Preceded by: Martin A. Herman; Thomas A. Pankok
- Succeeded by: John J. Burzichelli; Douglas H. Fisher

Personal details
- Born: June 25, 1943 (age 83) Atlantic City, New Jersey
- Party: Republican
- Spouse: Betsy
- Children: 4
- Education: Glassboro State College (BA, MA); Rutgers University, Camden (JD)

John Collins (born June 25, 1943) is an American educator, lawyer, former college basketball coach, and a Republican Party politician from New Jersey. He was Speaker of the New Jersey General Assembly from 1996 until 2002. As of 2025, he is the last Republican to be Assembly Speaker.

== Biography ==
Collins was born in Atlantic City and moved to Gloucester City at a young age. He attended Gloucester Catholic High School, where he excelled at basketball. He went on to Glassboro State College (now Rowan University), receiving a B.A. degree in science education in 1964 and a master's degree in student personnel services in 1967. With the Glassboro Profs basketball team, Collins scored 1,038 points in his career, earning him a place in the South Jersey Basketball Hall of Fame.

After graduation, he taught science and coached basketball at Sterling High School. The following year he was invited to become basketball coach at the newly established Camden County College. A year later he became head coach at Glassboro State, and at 26 was one of the youngest head basketball coaches in the country. As coach he racked up 131 victories and three consecutive conference titles. At Glassboro State he also served in the Admissions Office and worked as executive assistant to college president Herman James.

After retiring from his coaching career, Collins studied law at Rutgers School of Law–Camden, receiving his Juris Doctor degree in 1982. After a term on his local school board, the chairman of the Salem County Republican party asked him to run for the New Jersey General Assembly. Riding the coattails of Governor of New Jersey Thomas Kean in 1985, Collins and his running mate Gary Stuhltrager knocked off Democratic incumbents Martin A. Herman and Thomas A. Pankok, helping give the Republicans control of the General Assembly for the first time in more than a decade. He took office in 1986, representing the 3rd Legislative District.

When Republicans lost control of the Assembly in 1989, Collins was chosen by minority leader Chuck Haytaian to be his deputy. He became majority leader two years later when Republicans regained control of the Assembly and Haytaian was elected Speaker. In 1996, after Haytaian decided not to run for reelection following his unsuccessful 1994 campaign against Senator Frank Lautenberg, Collins succeeded Haytaian as speaker.

For six years he served as Assembly speaker with Donald DiFrancesco serving as New Jersey Senate President. Collins explored a campaign for Governor of New Jersey in the 2001 Republican primary against DiFrancesco (then Acting Governor) but ultimately decided against running. DiFrancesco would be forced to withdraw from the primary after questions about his business dealings.

Collins retired from the General Assembly in January 2002 after serving 16 years. He joined the Princeton Public Affairs Group, a prominent lobbying firm, as senior counsel.

Collins and his wife Betsy have resided on a 3-acre (12,000 m^{2}) farm in Pittsgrove Township since 1974. He has four children and ten grandchildren.

New Jersey General Assembly
Preceded by Martin A. Herman; Thomas A. Pankok	Member of the New Jersey General Assembly from the 3rd district 1986–2002; Served alongside: Gary Stuhltrager	Succeeded by John J. Burzichelli; Douglas H. Fisher
Political offices
Preceded by Chuck Haytaian	Speaker of the New Jersey General Assembly; 1996–2002	Succeeded by Albio Sires
