= Surf City, New Jersey =

Borough in Ocean County, New Jersey, US

- Borough
- Borough of Surf City
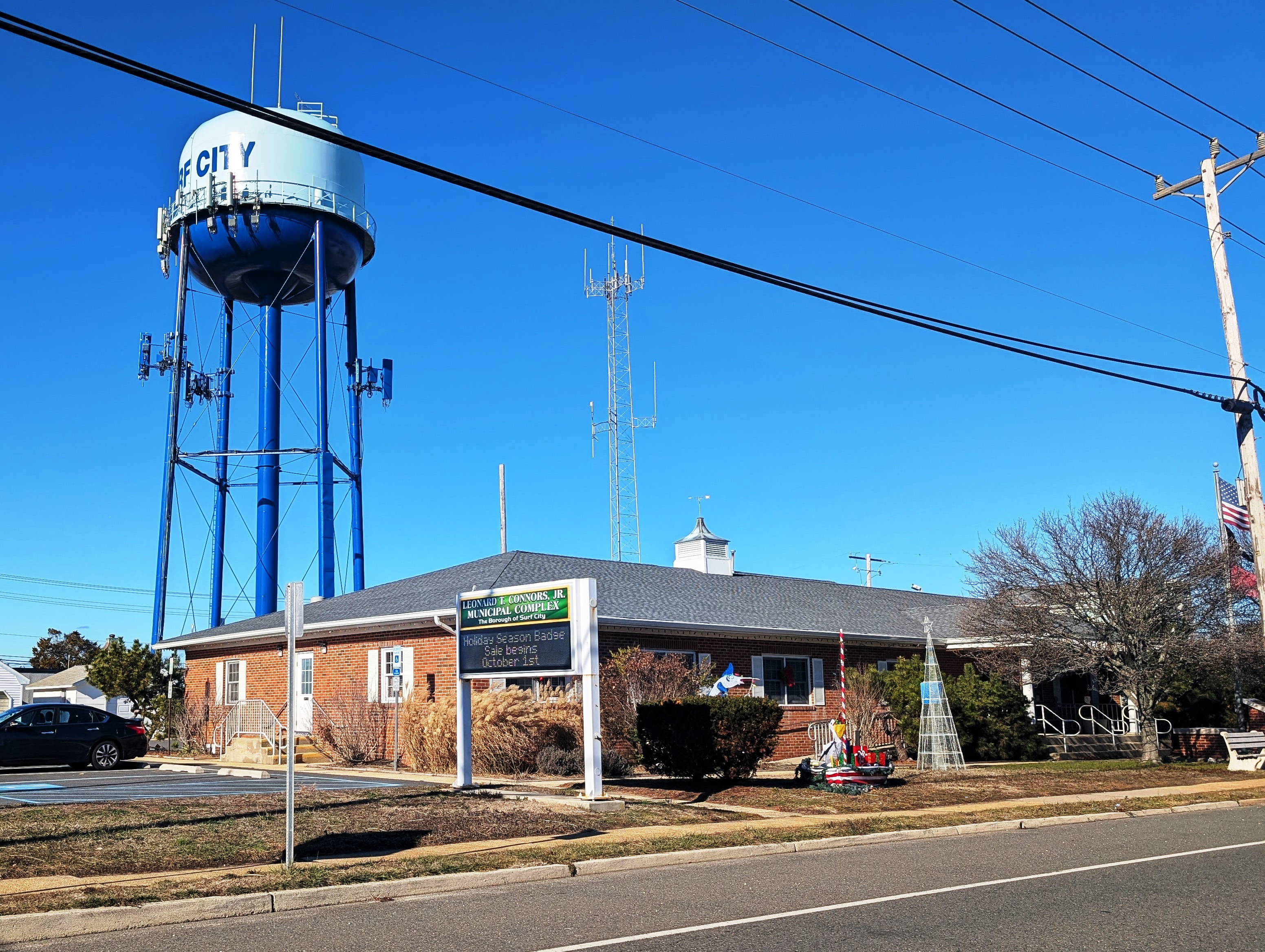
- Leonard T. Connors Jr. Municipal Complex and borough water tower

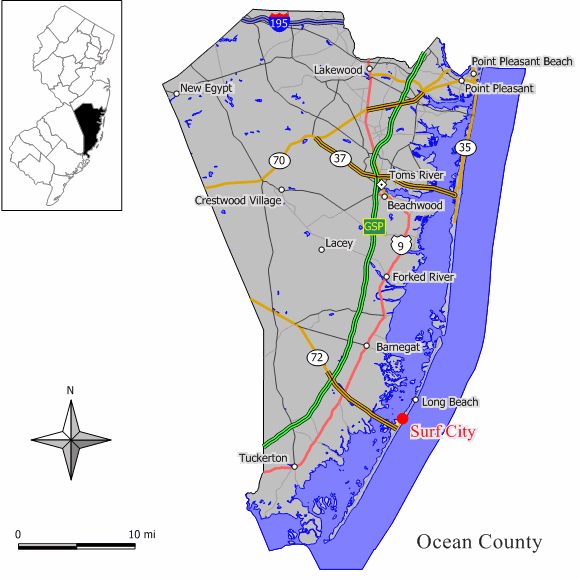
- Map of Surf City in Ocean County. Inset: Location of Ocean County highlighted in the State of New Jersey.

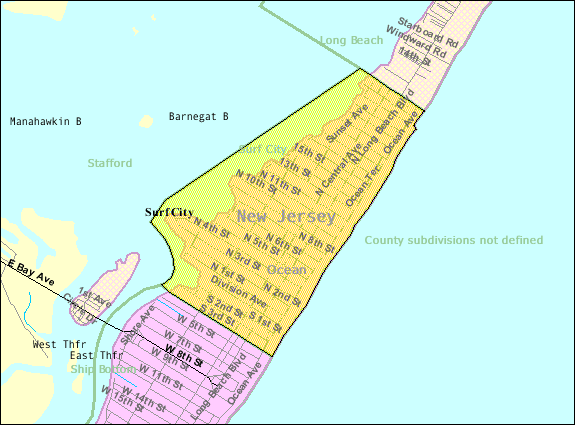
- Census Bureau map of Surf City, New Jersey

- Location in Ocean County Location in New Jersey Location in the United States
- Coordinates: 39°39′31″N 74°10′06″W
- Country: United States
- State: New Jersey
- County: Ocean
- Incorporated: September 19, 1894 as Long Beach City
- Renamed: May 26, 1899 as Surf City

Government
  - Type: Borough
  - Body: Borough Council
  - Mayor: Francis R. Hodgson Sr. (R, term ends December 31, 2027)
  - Administrator / Municipal clerk: Christine Hannemann

Area
  - Total: 1.32 sq mi (3.43 km^{2})
  - Land: 0.75 sq mi (1.93 km^{2})
  - Water: 0.58 sq mi (1.50 km^{2}) 43.94%
  - Rank: 468th of 565 in state 20th of 33 in county
- Elevation: 3 ft (0.91 m)

Population (2020)
  - Total: 1,243
  - Estimate (2023): 1,288
  - Rank: 523rd of 565 in state 27th of 33 in county
  - Density: 1,670.6/sq mi (645.0/km^{2})
  - Rank: 323rd of 565 in state 15th of 33 in county
- Time zone: UTC−05:00 (Eastern (EST))
  - Summer (DST): UTC−04:00 (Eastern (EDT))
- ZIP Code: 08008 – Beach Haven
- Area code: 609
- FIPS code: 3402971640
- GNIS feature ID: 0885413
- Website: surfcitynj.org

Surf City is a borough situated on the Jersey Shore in southern Ocean County, within the U.S. state of New Jersey. As of the 2020 United States census, the borough's population was 1,243, an increase of 38 (+3.2%) from the 2010 census count of 1,205, which in turn had reflected a decline of 237 (−16.4%) from the 1,442 counted in the 2000 census. The borough borders the Atlantic Ocean on Long Beach Island.

What is now Surf City was originally formed as Long Beach City borough by an act of the New Jersey Legislature on September 19, 1894, from portions of Stafford Township, based on the results of a referendum held the previous day. The borough was renamed Surf City by a resolution of the Borough Council as of May 26, 1899. The name was changed to avoid confusion with other places on the island and along the Jersey Shore.

== History ==
Present-day Surf City was home to one of the earliest big boarding hotels on the Jersey Shore, called the Mansion of Health, one of whose owners was Hudson Buzby. In the 1830s and 1840s, the area surrounding this hotel was called "Buzby's Place". The Mansion of Health burned down in 1874, but some old-timers still call the cove at the foot of South First Street on the bay side "Mansion Cove."

In 1875, the 20 or so permanent residents of the area decided to call the area Long Beach City, even though the area was still part of Stafford Township. In 1894, Surf City was incorporated, changing its name to Surf City in 1899 after the United States Postal Service required a name change before the town could incorporate, preventing it from being confused with Long Branch in Monmouth County.

== Geography ==
According to the United States Census Bureau, the borough had a total area of 1.32 square miles (3.43 km^{2}), including 0.74 square miles (1.93 km^{2}) of land and 0.58 square miles (1.5 km^{2}) of water (43.94%).

The borough is located 57 miles (92 km) east-southeast of Philadelphia and 71 miles (114 km) south of New York City. Surf City is also 60 miles (97 km) from the capitol of New Jersey, Trenton.

The borough borders the Ocean County municipalities of Long Beach Township, Ship Bottom and Stafford Township.

== Climate ==
According to the Köppen climate classification system, Surf City has a humid subtropical climate (Cfa) with hot, moderately humid summers, cool winters and year-around precipitation. Cfa climates are characterized by all months having an average mean temperature above 32.0 °F (0.0 °C), at least four months with an average mean temperature at or above 50.0 °F (10.0 °C), at least one month with an average mean temperature at or above 71.6 °F (22.0 °C) and no significant precipitation difference between seasons. During the summer months in Surf City, a cooling afternoon sea breeze is present on most days, but episodes of extreme heat and humidity can occur with heat index values at or above 95.0 °F (35.0 °C). During the winter months, episodes of extreme cold and wind can occur with wind chill values below 0.0 °F (−17.8 °C). The plant hardiness zone at Surf City Beach is 7a with an average annual extreme minimum air temperature of 3.7 °F (−15.7 °C). The average seasonal (November–April) snowfall total is 12 to 18 in (30 to 46 cm) and the average snowiest month is February which corresponds with the annual peak in nor'easter activity.

Climate data for Surf City Beach, NJ (1981–2010 Averages)
Month	Jan	Feb	Mar	Apr	May	Jun	Jul	Aug	Sep	Oct	Nov	Dec	Year
Mean daily maximum °F (°C)	40.2 (4.6)	42.5 (5.8)	49.2 (9.6)	57.8 (14.3)	68.1 (20.1)	77.2 (25.1)	82.7 (28.2)	81.5 (27.5)	75.6 (24.2)	65.0 (18.3)	55.0 (12.8)	45.2 (7.3)	61.8 (16.6)
Daily mean °F (°C)	33.1 (0.6)	35.2 (1.8)	41.5 (5.3)	50.3 (10.2)	60.3 (15.7)	69.6 (20.9)	75.3 (24.1)	74.2 (23.4)	67.9 (19.9)	56.8 (13.8)	47.5 (8.6)	37.9 (3.3)	54.2 (12.3)
Mean daily minimum °F (°C)	25.9 (−3.4)	27.9 (−2.3)	33.9 (1.1)	42.8 (6.0)	52.4 (11.3)	62.0 (16.7)	68.0 (20.0)	67.0 (19.4)	60.2 (15.7)	48.6 (9.2)	39.9 (4.4)	30.6 (−0.8)	46.7 (8.2)
Average precipitation inches (mm)	3.35 (85)	3.01 (76)	4.11 (104)	3.62 (92)	3.13 (80)	3.03 (77)	3.97 (101)	4.24 (108)	3.12 (79)	3.54 (90)	3.19 (81)	3.59 (91)	41.90 (1,064)
Average relative humidity (%)	66.6	64.7	63.2	64.3	67.3	71.6	70.9	72.5	71.1	69.9	68.6	67.5	68.2
Average dew point °F (°C)	23.2 (−4.9)	24.5 (−4.2)	29.9 (−1.2)	38.7 (3.7)	49.4 (9.7)	60.0 (15.6)	65.2 (18.4)	64.8 (18.2)	58.2 (14.6)	47.1 (8.4)	37.7 (3.2)	28.1 (−2.2)	44.0 (6.7)
Source: PRISM

Climate data for Atlantic City, NJ Ocean Water Temperature (25 SW Surf City)
Month	Jan	Feb	Mar	Apr	May	Jun	Jul	Aug	Sep	Oct	Nov	Dec	Year
Daily mean °F (°C)	37 (3)	35 (2)	42 (6)	48 (9)	56 (13)	63 (17)	70 (21)	73 (23)	70 (21)	61 (16)	53 (12)	44 (7)	54 (12)
Source: NOAA

== Ecology ==
According to the A. W. Kuchler U.S. potential natural vegetation types, Surf City would have a dominant vegetation type of Northern Cordgrass (73) with a dominant vegetation form of Coastal Prairie (20).

== Demographics ==
Historical population
Census	Pop.	Note	%±
1900	9		—
1910	40		344.4%
1920	43		7.5%
1930	76		76.7%
1940	129		69.7%
1950	291		125.6%
1960	419		44.0%
1970	1,129		169.5%
1980	1,571		39.1%
1990	1,375		−12.5%
2000	1,442		4.9%
2010	1,205		−16.4%
2020	1,243		3.2%
2023 (est.)	1,288	▲	3.6%
Population sources: 1900–2000 1900–1920; 1900–1910 1910–1930; 1940–2000 2000; 2010 2020

=== 2010 census ===
The 2010 United States census counted 1,205 people, 622 households, and 366 families in the borough. The population density was 1,616.5 inhabitants per square mile (624.1/km^{2}). There were 2,566 housing units at an average density of 3,442.4 per square mile (1,329.1/km^{2}). The racial makeup was 95.52% (1,151) White, 1.33% (16) Black or African American, 0.00% (0) Native American, 0.58% (7) Asian, 0.33% (4) Pacific Islander, 1.41% (17) from other races, and 0.83% (10) from two or more races. Hispanic or Latino of any race were 5.06% (61) of the population.

Of the 622 households, 10.5% had children under the age of 18; 48.6% were married couples living together; 5.9% had a female householder with no husband present and 41.2% were non-families. Of all households, 35.9% were made up of individuals and 22.7% had someone living alone who was 65 years of age or older. The average household size was 1.94 and the average family size was 2.45.

9.4% of the population were under the age of 18, 4.5% from 18 to 24, 14.6% from 25 to 44, 32.9% from 45 to 64, and 38.6% who were 65 years of age or older. The median age was 59.4 years. For every 100 females, the population had 95.6 males. For every 100 females ages 18 and older there were 96.4 males.

The Census Bureau's 2006–2010 American Community Survey showed that (in 2010 inflation-adjusted dollars) median household income was $63,375 (with a margin of error of +/− $12,908) and the median family income was $74,479 (+/− $16,901). Males had a median income of $58,750 (+/− $18,197) versus $51,000 (+/− $27,120) for females. The per capita income for the borough was $42,677 (+/− $4,230). About 2.9% of families and 5.0% of the population were below the poverty line, including 11.7% of those under age 18 and 4.8% of those age 65 or over.

=== 2000 census ===
As of the 2000 United States census there were 1,442 people, 706 households, and 420 families residing in the borough. The population density was 1,990.4 inhabitants per square mile (768.5/km^{2}). There were 2,621 housing units at an average density of 3,617.9 per square mile (1,396.9/km^{2}). The racial makeup of the borough was 98.06% White, 0.14% African American, 0.21% Native American, 0.35% Asian, 0.42% Pacific Islander, 0.55% from other races, and 0.28% from two or more races. Hispanic or Latino of any race were 1.94% of the population.

There were 706 households, out of which 13.0% had children under the age of 18 living with them, 48.6% were married couples living together, 7.1% had a female householder with no husband present, and 40.4% were non-families. 34.8% of all households were made up of individuals, and 19.4% had someone living alone who was 65 years of age or older. The average household size was 2.04 and the average family size was 2.61.

In the borough the population was spread out, with 12.4% under the age of 18, 5.1% from 18 to 24, 21.6% from 25 to 44, 26.8% from 45 to 64, and 34.1% who were 65 years of age or older. The median age was 53 years. For every 100 females, there were 90.5 males. For every 100 females age 18 and over, there were 88.8 males.

The median income for a household in the borough was $38,190, and the median income for a family was $50,268. Males had a median income of $40,625 versus $25,208 for females. The per capita income for the borough was $26,632. About 5.6% of families and 7.5% of the population were below the poverty line, including 22.1% of those under age 18 and 3.9% of those age 65 or over.

== Sports ==
The Surf City Yacht Club participates in weekly races against other yacht clubs throughout the Island, with many sailors and swimmers ranging in age dedicating their summers to the Yacht Club.

The Surf City Beach Patrol won the Surf City Epic, Lavallette, Ortley Beach, Island Beach State Park, the Midway Beach, and "Islands" Tournaments in 2008, narrowly missing out on victories at Sandy Hook (2nd) and the Ship Bottom (2nd) "State Tournament" losing by only a combined 4.5 points. The SCBP squad were back-to-back LBIBPA Island Champions (2007 & 2008) for the first time in the last 25+ years. The high point of the season came during the IBSP tournament when Surf City won by 23 points.

== Government ==
=== Local government ===
Surf City is governed under the borough form of New Jersey municipal government, which is used in 218 municipalities (of the 564) statewide, making it the most common form of government in New Jersey. The governing body is comprised of the mayor and the borough council, with all positions elected at-large on a partisan basis as part of the November general election. The mayor is elected directly by the voters to a four-year term of office. The borough council includes six members elected to serve three-year terms on a staggered basis, with two seats coming up for election each year in a three-year cycle. The borough form of government used by Surf City is a "weak mayor / strong council" government in which council members act as the legislative body with the mayor presiding at meetings and voting only in the event of a tie. The mayor can veto ordinances subject to an override by a two-thirds majority vote of the council. The mayor makes committee and liaison assignments for council members, and most appointments are made by the mayor with the advice and consent of the council.

As of 2025, the mayor of Surf City Borough is Republican Francis R. Hodgson Sr., whose term of office ends December 31, 2027. After serving 46 years on the borough council, Hodgson succeeded Leonard T. Connors Jr., who had served as the state senator from the 9th Legislative District and spent 50 years as mayor. With the death of Tinton Falls mayor Vito Perillo in 2025, Hodgson is currently the oldest incumbent mayor in New Jersey at the age of 92. Members of the Surf City Borough Council are Council President John H. Klose (R, 2024), Peter M. Hartney (R, 2022), William D. Hodgson (R, 2023), John D. McMenamin (R, 2023; appointed to serve an unexpired term), James B. Russell (R, 2024) and Jacqueline L. Siciliano (R, 2022). All of the seats on the borough council have been held by Republicans since Democrat Donald Cummings served on the council in the early 1960s; the last major electoral performance by a Democrat in a borough council election was in 1969 when Hodgson Sr. defeated Cummings' comeback bid by 200 votes.

John D. McMenamin was appointed to fill the council seat expiring in December 2023 that was vacant following the resignation of John G. Hadash III that same month.

In January 2016, John G. Hadash III was appointed to fill the seat expiring in December 2017 that had been held by Francis R. Hodgson Sr., until he stepped down in January 2016 to take office as mayor. Hadash served on an interim basis until the November 2016 general election, when voters chose him to serve the balance of the term of office.

=== Federal, state and county representation ===
Surf City is located in the 2nd Congressional District and is part of New Jersey's 9th state legislative district.

For the 119th United States Congress, New Jersey's 2nd congressional district is represented by Jeff Van Drew (R, Dennis Township). New Jersey is represented in the United States Senate by Democrats Cory Booker (Newark, term ends 2027) and Andy Kim (Moorestown, term ends 2031).

For the 2026–2027 session, the 9th legislative district of the New Jersey Legislature is represented in the State Senate by Carmen Amato (R, Berkeley Township) and in the General Assembly by Greg Myhre (R, Stafford Township) and Brian E. Rumpf (R, Little Egg Harbor Township).

Ocean County is governed by a Board of County Commissioners composed of five members who are elected on an at-large basis in partisan elections and serving staggered three-year terms of office, with either one or two seats coming up for election each year as part of the November general election. At an annual reorganization held in the beginning of January, the board chooses a director and a deputy director from among its members. As of 2025, Ocean County's Commissioners (with party affiliation, term-end year and residence) are:

John P. Kelly (R, 2025, Eagleswood Township), Virginia E. Haines (R, 2025, Toms River), Robert Arace (R, Manchester Township, 2027) Jennifer Bacchione (R, Berkeley Township, 2027) and Frank Sadeghi (R, 2026, Toms River).

Constitutional officers elected on a countywide basis are: Clerk Scott M. Colabella (R, 2025, Barnegat Light), Sheriff Michael G. Mastronardy (R, 2025; Toms River) and Surrogate Jeffrey Moran (R, 2028, Beachwood).

=== Politics ===
As of March 2011, there were a total of 1,030 registered voters in Surf City, of which 166 (16.1%) were registered as Democrats, 433 (42.0%) were registered as Republicans and 427 (41.5%) were registered as Unaffiliated. There were 4 voters registered as Libertarians or Greens. Among the borough's 2010 Census population, 85.5% (vs. 63.2% in Ocean County) were registered to vote, including 94.3% of those ages 18 and over (vs. 82.6% countywide).

Gubernatorial election results for Surf City
Year	Republican		Democratic		Third party(ies)	
Year	No.	%	No.	%	No.	%
2025	477	57.82%	348	42.18%	0	0.00%
2021	428	61.58%	262	37.70%	5	0.72%
2017	363	63.80%	196	34.45%	10	1.76%
2013	448	82.81%	86	15.90%	7	1.29%
2009	417	62.24%	211	31.49%	42	6.27%
2005	358	62.81%	193	33.86%	19	3.33%

In the 2012 presidential election, Republican Mitt Romney received 61.8% of the vote (402 cast), ahead of Democrat Barack Obama with 37.8% (246 votes), and other candidates with 0.3% (2 votes), among the 655 ballots cast by the city's 1,108 registered voters (5 ballots were spoiled), for a turnout of 59.1%. In the 2008 presidential election, Republican John McCain received 60.9% of the vote (485 cast), ahead of Democrat Barack Obama with 37.5% (299 votes) and other candidates with 1.0% (8 votes), among the 797 ballots cast by the borough's 1,078 registered voters, for a turnout of 73.9%. In the 2004 presidential election, Republican George W. Bush received 60.8% of the vote (511 ballots cast), outpolling Democrat John Kerry with 38.0% (320 votes) and other candidates with 0.4% (5 votes), among the 841 ballots cast by the borough's 1,153 registered voters, for a turnout percentage of 72.9.

Presidential Elections Results
Year	Republican	Democratic	Third Parties
2024	52.8% 493	45.2% 422	2.0% 15
2020	54.1% 504	44.4% 413	1.5% 11
2016	56.4% 440	40.4% 315	3.2% 25
2012	61.8% 402	37.8% 246	0.3% 2
2008	60.9% 485	37.5% 299	1.0% 8
2004	60.8% 511	38.0% 320	0.4% 5

In the 2013 gubernatorial election, Republican Chris Christie received 82.8% of the vote (448 cast), ahead of Democrat Barbara Buono with 15.9% (86 votes), and other candidates with 1.3% (7 votes), among the 559 ballots cast by the city's 1,070 registered voters (18 ballots were spoiled), for a turnout of 52.2%. In the 2009 gubernatorial election, Republican Chris Christie received 61.2% of the vote (417 ballots cast), ahead of Democrat Jon Corzine with 31.0% (211 votes), Independent Chris Daggett with 5.9% (40 votes) and other candidates with 0.3% (2 votes), among the 681 ballots cast by the borough's 1,043 registered voters, yielding a 65.3% turnout.

United States Senate election results for Surf City1
Year	Republican		Democratic		Third party(ies)	
Year	No.	%	No.	%	No.	%
2024	499	54.90%	399	43.89%	11	1.21%
2018	433	63.40%	232	33.97%	18	2.64%
2012	384	60.76%	221	34.97%	27	4.27%
2006	358	64.27%	189	33.93%	10	1.80%

United States Senate election results for Surf City2
Year	Republican		Democratic		Third party(ies)	
Year	No.	%	No.	%	No.	%
2020	524	57.39%	375	41.07%	14	1.53%
2014	309	65.19%	159	33.54%	6	1.27%
2013	234	63.76%	131	35.69%	2	0.54%
2008	466	61.24%	284	37.32%	11	1.45%

== Education ==
From pre-kindergarten through sixth grade, public school students attend the Long Beach Island Consolidated School District, which also serves students from Barnegat Light, Harvey Cedars, Long Beach Township and Ship Bottom. As of the 2020–21 school year, the district, comprised of two schools, had an enrollment of 215 students and 30.7 classroom teachers (on an FTE basis), for a student–teacher ratio of 7.0:1. Schools in the district (with 2020–21 enrollment data from the National Center for Education Statistics) are Ethel Jacobsen School in Surf City with 111 students in pre-kindergarten to second grade and Long Beach Island Grade School in Ship Bottom with 125 students in grades 3–6. The district's board of education is comprised of nine members who are directly elected from the constituent municipalities on a staggered basis, with three members elected each year. Of the nine seats, one is elected from Surf City.

Students in public school for the seventh through twelfth grades attend the Southern Regional School District, which serves the five municipalities in the Long Beach Island Consolidated School District, along with students from Beach Haven and Stafford Township, as well as students from Ocean Township (including its Waretown section) who attend as part of a sending/receiving relationship. Schools in the district (with 2020–21 enrollment data from the National Center for Education Statistics) are Southern Regional Middle School with 902 students in grades 7–8 and Southern Regional High School with 1,975 students in grades 9–12. Both schools are in the Manahawkin section of Stafford Township.

== Transportation ==
=== Roads and highways ===
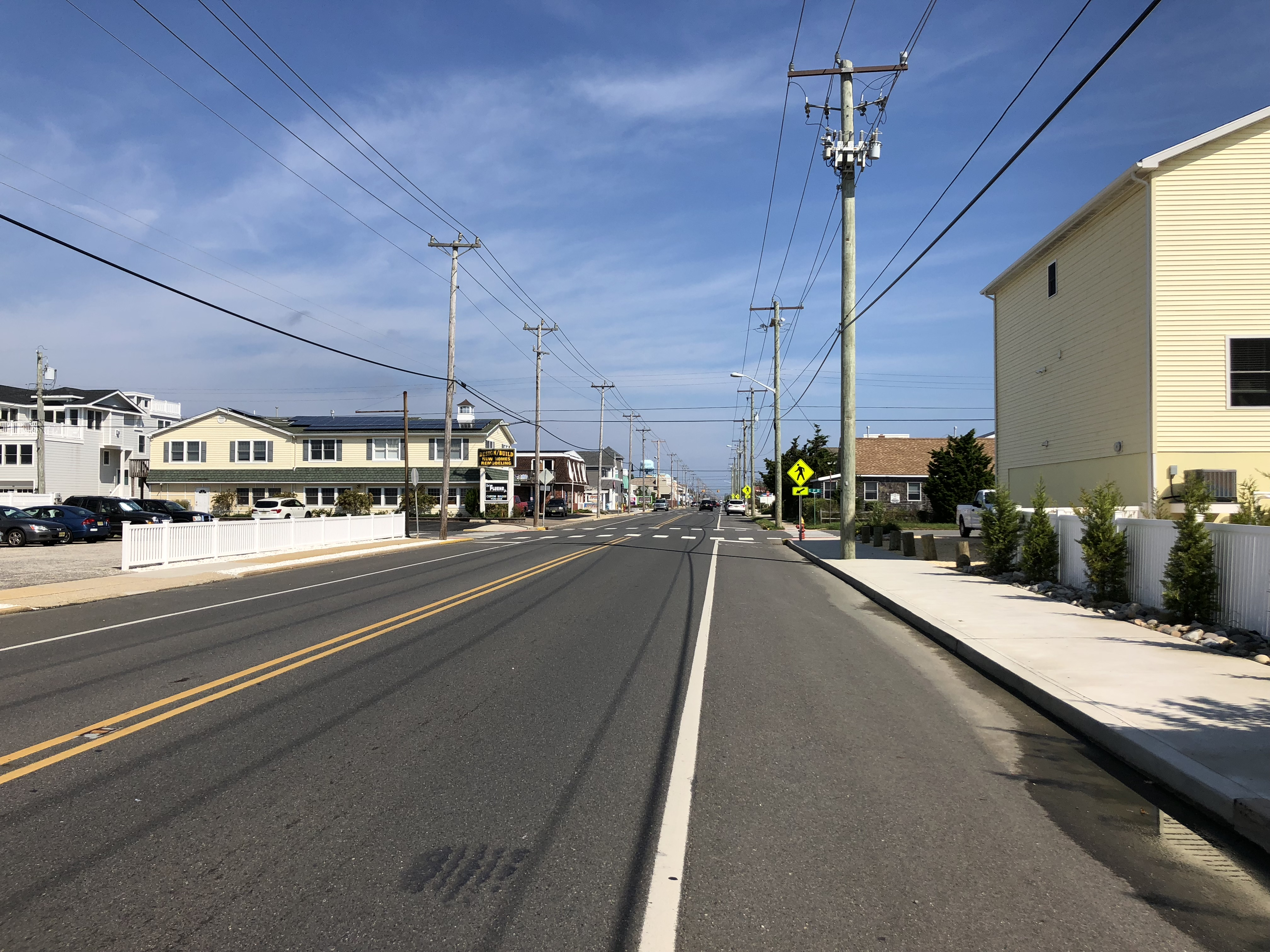
Northbound County Route 607 (Long Beach Boulevard) in Surf City

As of May 2010, the borough had a total of 16.97 mi (27.31 km) of roadways, of which 15.30 mi (24.62 km) were maintained by the municipality and 1.67 mi (2.69 km) by Ocean County.

No Interstate, U.S. or state highways serve Surf City. The main road serving the borough is County Route 607 (Long Beach Boulevard).

=== Public transportation ===
TransportAzumah offers weekend service during the summer season between Midtown Manhattan in New York City and Long Beach Island with a stop at Newark Liberty International Airport.

Ocean Ride local service is provided on the OC9 Long Beach Island route.

The LBI Shuttle operates along Long Beach Boulevard, providing free service every 5 to 20 minutes from 10:00 AM to 10:00 PM. It serves the Long Beach Island municipalities / communities of Barnegat Light, Loveladies, Harvey Cedars, North Beach, Surf City, Ship Bottom, Long Beach Township, Beach Haven and Holgate.

== Media ==
Surf City is served primarily by Philadelphia and New York television stations, Atlantic City and Philadelphia-based radio stations and two daily newspapers, The Press of Atlantic City and Asbury Park Press.

== Notable people ==
People who were born in, residents of, or otherwise closely associated with Surf City include:

- Francis L. Bodine (1936–2023), politician who represented the 8th Legislative District in the New Jersey General Assembly from 1994 to 2008
- Christopher J. Connors (born 1956), member of the New Jersey Senate from the 9th Legislative District since 2008, when he succeeded his father
- Leonard T. Connors (1929–2016), politician who served in the state senate from 1982 to 2008 representing the 9th Legislative District, and served for nearly 50 years as mayor of Surf City, from 1966 to 2015

== Sources ==
- Lloyd, John Bailey. Eighteen Miles of History on Long Beach Island., Down The Shore Publishing and The SandPaper, Inc., 1994. ISBN 9780945582175.

Preceded by North Beach	Beaches of New Jersey	Succeeded by Ship Bottom
