= Southern Regional High School =

High school in Ocean County, New Jersey, US

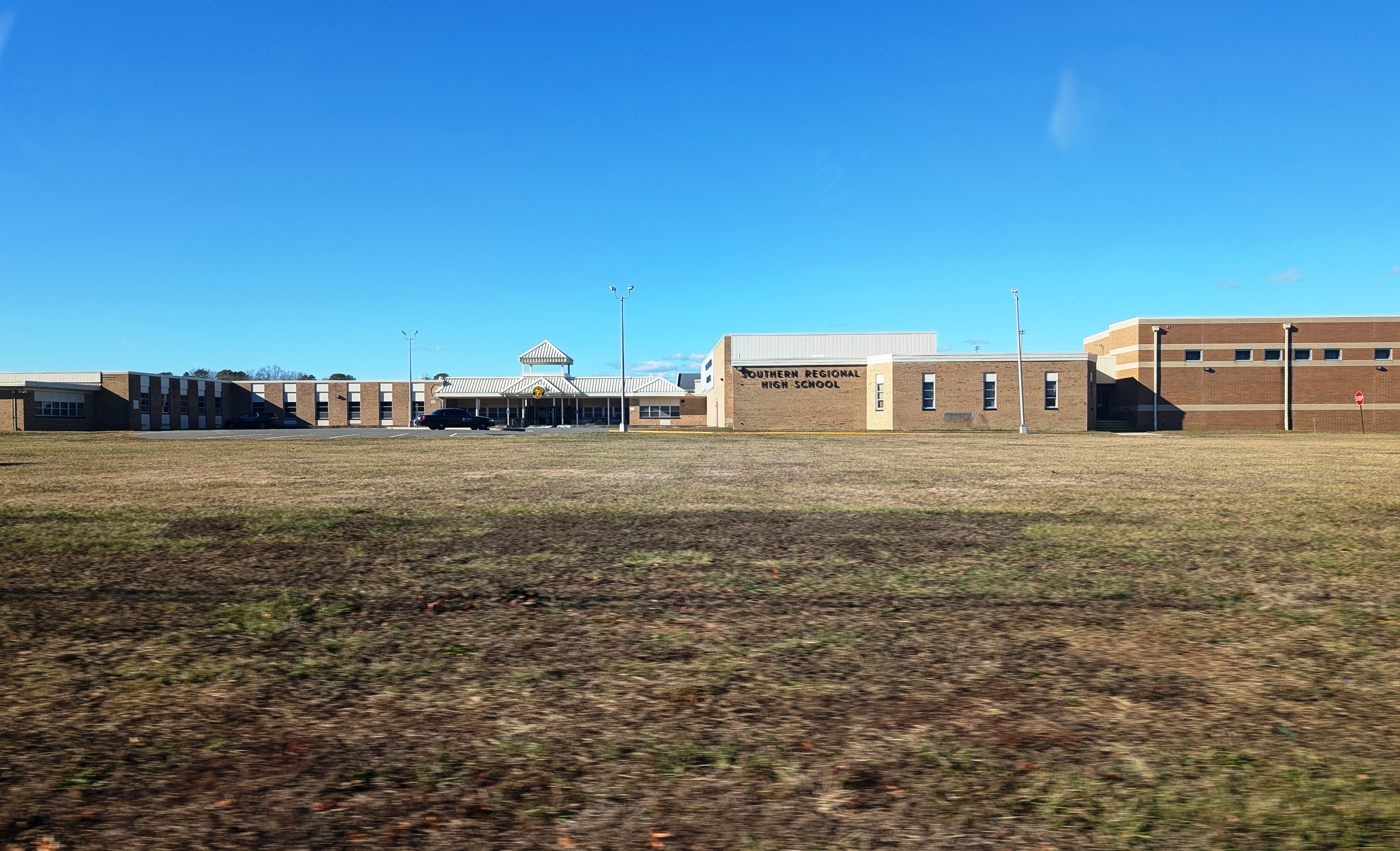

Location
- 90 Cedar Bridge Road; Stafford Township, Ocean County, New Jersey 08050; United States; 39°42′43″N 74°15′14″W

Information
- Type: Public high school
- Motto: "Committed to Excellence"
- Established: 1957
- School district: Southern Regional School District
- Superintendent: Craig Henry
- NCES School ID: 341548004710
- Principal: Joseph Medica
- Faculty: 149.0 FTEs
- Grades: 9-12
- Enrollment: 1,820 (as of 2024–25)
- Student to teacher ratio: 12.2:1
- Campus: 550 acres (220 ha)
- Colors: Black and Gold
- Athletics conference: Shore Conference
- Team name: Rams
- Rival: Toms River High School North, Brick Township Memorial High School, Jackson Memorial High School
- Publication: Rampage
- Website: www.srsd.net/HighSchool

Southern Regional High School is a regional comprehensive public high school located in the Manahawkin section of Stafford Township in Ocean County, in the U.S. state of New Jersey, serving students in the ninth through twelfth grades and operating as part of the Southern Regional School District. The school is located on a 550-acre (220 ha) wooded campus. The district serves the five municipalities in the Long Beach Island Consolidated School District — Barnegat Light, Harvey Cedars, Long Beach Township, Ship Bottom, and Surf City — along with students from Beach Haven and Stafford Township, and additionally the sending district of Ocean Township (including its Waretown section).

As of the 2024–25 school year, the school had an enrollment of 1,820 students and 149.0 classroom teachers (on an FTE basis), for a student–teacher ratio of 12.2:1. There were 372 students (20.4% of enrollment) eligible for free lunch and 77 (4.2% of students) eligible for reduced-cost lunch.

== History ==
In May 1956, voters approved by a better than 100-1 margin the construction of a building designed to accommodate 1,500 students in a building on a 45-acre (18 ha) site that would cost $1.5 million (equivalent to $17.8 million in 2025). Prior to the opening of Southern Regional, students from Barnegat, Ocean Township, and Long Beach Island attended the former Barnegat High School, while students from Stafford, Eagleswood, Tuckerton, Little Egg Harbor, and Bass River attended the former Tuckerton High School, which currently houses Tuckerton's elementary school.

Southern Regional High School opened in 1957 as a junior-senior high school, housing students from Stafford Township, Barnegat Township, Ocean Township, Tuckerton, Little Egg Harbor, Eagleswood Township, Bass River Township, and all six municipalities of Long Beach Island.

At first, the school only had two sports; boys' baseball and boys' basketball. Football was added in 1958, and wrestling came two years later. Girls had "Sports Nights" instead of competitive teams. It would not be until the 1960s when women's sports would first appear at Southern. Due to the quick growth of the area, a new wing and expanded gymnasium were added in 1966.

In 1970, Southern Regional Middle School opened its doors to 7th and 8th graders. However, it soon became overcrowded. Starting in 1979, students from Tuckerton, Little Egg Harbor, Bass River, and Eagleswood, would attend the newly opened Pinelands Regional High School in Tuckerton. At the same time, an expansion was built onto the middle school, all ninth graders were moved from the high school to the middle school.

The high school went through several changes throughout the 1990s. In December 1991, maintenance crews installing a heating system sparked the fire that damaged the guidance area and several science labs, which were later remodeled. The school also caught fire two years later after an explosion occurred in the school's main electric panel. While a new wing of classrooms was added to the high school in 1996, a new two-story building was opened in 1998 adjacent to the existing high school, with the old high school building housing ninth and tenth graders known as the "9/10 building", and the new building which houses eleventh and twelfth graders being known as the "11/12 building. At the same time, the middle school went back to housing the seventh and eighth graders.

In 2004, the Barnegat High School opened, starting with only a freshman class. Each year, a new year was added to Barnegat High School. June 2007 marked Southern Regional's last graduating class with students from Barnegat. Barnegat High School became a full 9-12 high school in September 2007 and graduated its first seniors in June 2008. Prior to the termination of the sending relationship with Barnegat, the Southern district had received as much as $30 million for students attending the school.

== Awards, recognition and rankings ==
The school was the 192nd-ranked public high school in New Jersey out of 339 schools statewide in New Jersey Monthly magazine's September 2014 cover story on the state's "Top Public High Schools", using a new ranking methodology. The school had been ranked 236th in the state of 328 schools in 2012, after being ranked 154th in 2010 out of 322 schools listed. The magazine ranked the school 192nd in 2008 out of 316 schools. The school was ranked 213th in the magazine's September 2006 issue, which surveyed 316 schools across the state. Schooldigger.com ranked the school tied for 175th out of 381 public high schools statewide in its 2011 rankings (an increase of 20 positions from the 2010 ranking) which were based on the combined percentage of students classified as proficient or above proficient on the mathematics (79.4%) and language arts literacy (94.2%) components of the High School Proficiency Assessment (HSPA).

== Academic programs ==
Southern Regional offers over 202 courses from which students can select. For the 2026–27 school year, Southern Regional High School offers Honors, Advanced, and College Preparatory course pathways, with Advanced Placement courses available in subjects including English, mathematics, science, social studies, and world languages. The courses are designed to appeal to a wide variety of student interests. Advanced Placement (AP) courses offered include AP English Language and Composition, AP English Literature and Composition, AP United States History, AP Biology, AP Chemistry, AP Music Theory, AP Studio Art, Spanish Language AP United States Government and Politics, AP Statistics and AP Calculus (AB and BC are both offered). Several AP classes can be taken as independent study courses if a student is very adept at that subject, and or has completed previous AP courses. Courses such as, AP Comparative Government and Politics, is the most commonly taken. There are also honors classes such as Honors Wind Ensemble and Honors Select Choir.

The health and physical education program are required courses. Project Adventure, an outdoor education program, and behind-the-wheel driver education are also offered. Additionally, Southern Regional has an "Honor Unit" Air Force Junior ROTC program, which concentrates on aerospace science, leadership training, and community service. The special needs of students are addressed as well, through self-contained, resource, adaptive success, and in-class support programs. Mainsail (alternative) and ESL (English as a Second Language) programs are offered for eligible students. In addition to the academic programs, Southern Regional offers students over 70 co-curricular and interscholastic programs.

== Athletics ==
The Southern Regional High School Rams compete in Division A South of the Shore Conference, an athletic conference comprised of public and private high schools in Monmouth and Ocean counties along the Jersey Shore. The conference operates under the jurisdiction of the New Jersey State Interscholastic Athletic Association (NJSIAA). With 1,438 students in grades 10–12, the school was classified by the NJSIAA for the 2019–20 school year as Group IV for most athletic competition purposes, which included schools with an enrollment of 1,060 to 5,049 students in that grade range. The school was classified by the NJSIAA as Group V South for football for 2024–2026, which included schools with 1,333 to 2,324 students.

The school was recognized as the Group IV winner of the NJSIAA ShopRite Cup in 2006–07. The award recognized the school for achieving first place in girls indoor track and field relays, indoor track and field, and girls track and field; second place in wrestling and boys volleyball; and third place in girls volleyball.

The school was also recognized as the Group IV winner of the ShopRite Cup in 2008–09. Southern was recognized for achieving first place in girls volleyball, girls winter track relays, girls winter track, boys volleyball and girls outdoor track, second place in football and wrestling, and third place in boys cross-country and boys outdoor track, plus bonus points for having no disqualifications in the winter and spring seasons.

The boys' wrestling team won the South Jersey Group IV state sectional championship in 1997, 2005–2009, 2011–2014, and the South Jersey Group V title in 2016 and 2018–2020 and 2022-2025; the team won the Group IV state championship in 2005, and the Group V title in 2016, 2019, 2020 and 2023-2025. The team won the 2007 South, Group IV state sectional championship with a 51–12 win against Toms River High School East.

The girls' track team won the Group IV indoor relay state championship in 2007, 2009 and 2010.

The Southern football team had its most successful season in 2007. The team became the winningest team in school history by going 8–3. They also advanced to the NJSIAA South Jersey Group IV state playoffs where they won their first playoff game in school history defeating Washington Township High School by 21–7 in the first round before falling to top-seeded Toms River High School North 33–0 in the tournament semifinal. The 2008 team became the winningest team in school history by going 10–2. They also advanced to the NJSIAA South Jersey Group IV state finals where they lost to Mainland High School 21–14. In 2012, the Southern Regional football team went 9–3 with playoff victories over Washington Township High School and Eastern Regional High School before falling to Williamstown High School by a score of 43–20 in the South Jersey Group V Final.

The girls' outdoor track and field team won the Group IV state championship in 2007–2009.

Southern is also home to one of the most successful volleyball programs in the state. Both the boys and girls volleyball teams, coached by Eric Maxwell, routinely compete for state championships; Maxwell won his 300th boys coaching victory in May 2011. The girls volleyball team won the Group IV state championship in 2008 after defeating Hunterdon Central Regional High School in three sets (25-19, 13–25, 25–20) in the playoff's final match. The boys volleyball team won the overall state championship in 2009 (defeating St. Peter's Preparatory School in the final match of the tournament), 2010 (vs. St. Peter's), 2013 (vs. St. Joseph High School of Metuchen), 2014 (vs. St. Peter's), 2016 (vs. Harrison High School) and 2017 (vs. Fair Lawn High School). The program's six state titles are ranked second among all schools in the state.

The ice hockey team won the Dowd Cup in 2016.

The boys' outdoor track team won the Group IV state championship in 2021.

== Extracurricular activities ==
The school's marching band was Tournament of Bands Chapter One Champions from 2001 to 2005 (Group 4) and 2011 (Group 2). The marching band was also New Jersey State Champions in 2011 for Group 2. The marching band was Atlantic Coast Champions in Group 4 in 2003, 2004 and in 2005 was the co-champion, in Group 3 in 2013 and 2017, in Group 2 in 2011, 2022, and in 2024. The marching band was also Atlantic Coast Champions in Group 2 in 2011. Prior to 2017, the marching band also competed in another circuit called Cavalcade of Bands. The marching band was Cavalcade of Bands Champions for the Liberty division in 2010 and 2011. The Jazz Ensemble has also won state championships and has received many top honors. Both the Symphonic Band and Wind Ensemble have been ranked in the top four bands in the region for the past ten years and have been selected for the State Concert Band Gala every year since its inception. Southern Regional is known for having one of the premier music departments in the state.

The school came in second place in the Consumer Bowl 2007 state championship, a program that evaluates the skills of students as informed consumers.

== Administration ==
The school's principal is Joseph Medica. His core administration team includes four assistant principals.

== Notable alumni ==
- Mary Birdsong (born 1968, class of 1986), actress best known for playing Deputy Cherisha Kimball on Reno 911!
- Glenn Carson (born 1990, class of 2009), former NFL linebacker who played for the Arizona Cardinals
- Christopher J. Connors (born 1956), member of the New Jersey Senate from the 9th Legislative District from 2008 to 2024
- Matt Cook (born 1984, class of 2002), actor known mostly for his roles on the TBS sitcom Clipped and on the CBS sitcom Man with a Plan
- Joseph D'Agostino (born 1988, class of 2006), co-founder and current lead singer and guitarist of Cymbals Eat Guitars
- Mike Gesicki (born 1995, class of 2014), tight end who plays for the Cincinnati Bengals, and previously for the Miami Dolphins and the New England Patriots
- DiAnne Gove (born 1951, class of 1969), politician who represented the 9th Legislative District in the New Jersey General Assembly from 2009 to 2024, served as Mayor of Long Beach Township and was a teacher at Southern Regional for 32 years.
- Clark Harris (born 1984, class of 2002), football long snapper and tight end who played professionally for the Green Bay Packers, Detroit Lions, Houston Texans and most recently for the Cincinnati Bengals
- Paul Johnson (1955-2004, class of 1973), Lockheed Martin helicopter engineer who was abducted and beheaded by Al-Qaeda in Saudi Arabia
- Kareem Rashad Sultan Khan (1987-2007, class of 2005), Muslim-American U.S. Army Specialist who died in Operation Iraqi Freedom and was awarded a Purple Heart and a Bronze Star
- Matt Kmosko (born 1972, class of 1990), former U.S. soccer defender who earned three caps playing on the United States men's national soccer team and played three and a half seasons in Major League Soccer playing for the Colorado Rapids, Miami Fusion and Columbus Crew
- Matt McAndrew (born 1990, class of 2009), singer-songwriter best known for his appearance in Season 7 of NBC's reality TV singing competition The Voice where he finished as the runner-up
- Matthew Miller (born 1987, class of 2006), co-founder and current drummer of Cymbals Eat Guitars
- Frank Molinaro (born 1988, class of 2007), wrestler who competed as a member of the U.S. team at the 2016 Summer Olympics
- Martin Truex Jr. (born 1980, class of 1998), Monster Energy NASCAR Cup Series 2017 Champion who drives the No. 19 Toyota Camry for Joe Gibbs Racing
- Ryan Truex (born 1992, class of 2010), NASCAR Xfinity Series driver who currently drives the No. 11 Chevrolet Camaro for Kaulig Racing and previously drove the No. 16 Toyota Tundra for Hattori Racing Enterprises in the NASCAR Camping World Truck Series
