= Henrickson =

Henrickson is a surname. Notable people with the surname include:

- Bonnie Henrickson, the head women's college basketball coach at the University of Kansas
- Clifford A. Henricksen, musician, inventor and audio technologist
- James Solberg Henrickson (born 1940), American botanist
- Lance Henriksen (born 1940), American actor and artist

Fictional characters on the HBO series Big Love

- Barbara Henrickson
- Ben Henrickson
- Sarah Henrickson

== See also ==
- Hendrickson (disambiguation)
- Henrikson
