= Eagleswood Township, New Jersey =

Township in Ocean County, New Jersey, US

- Township
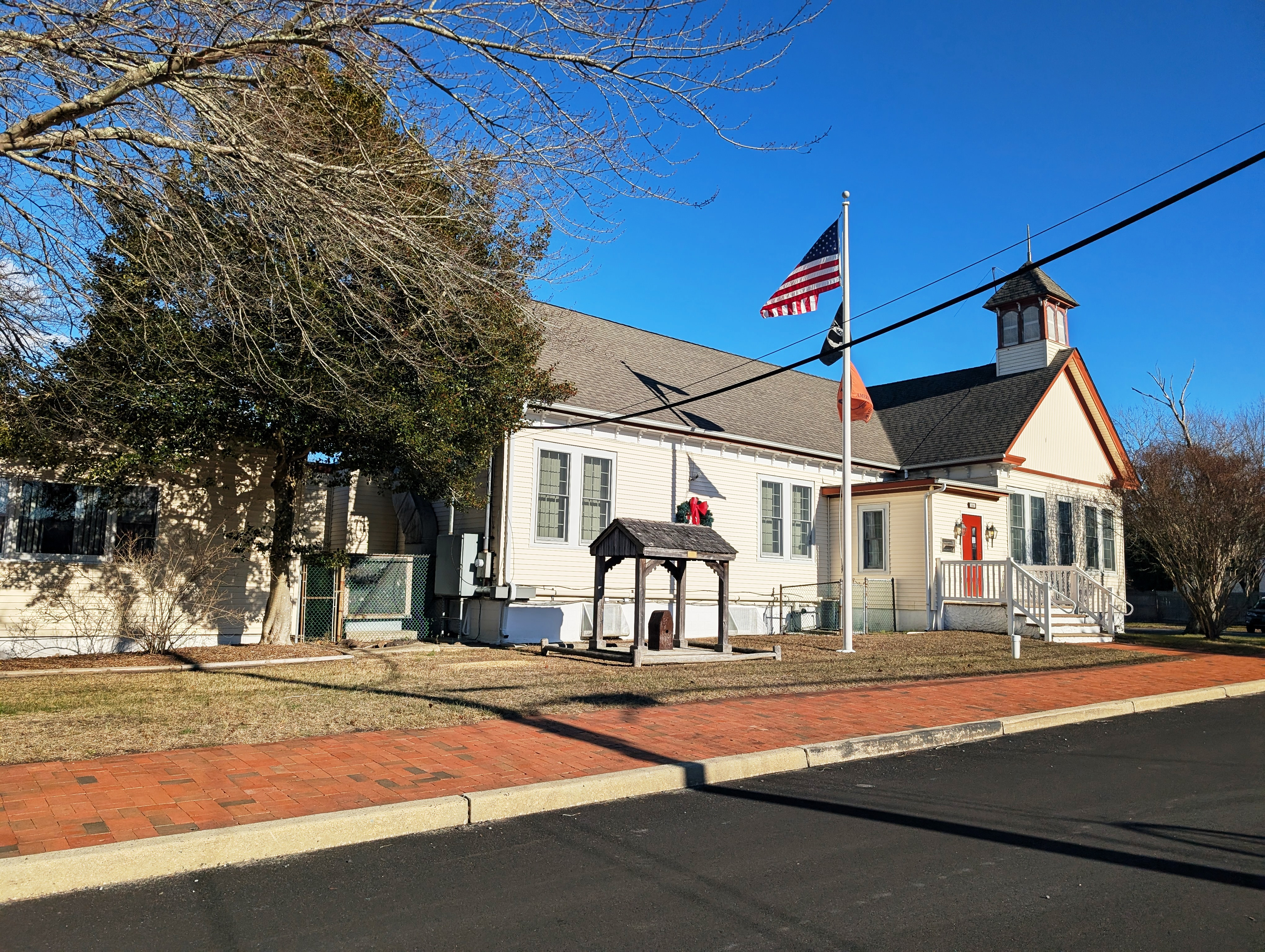
- Municipal building

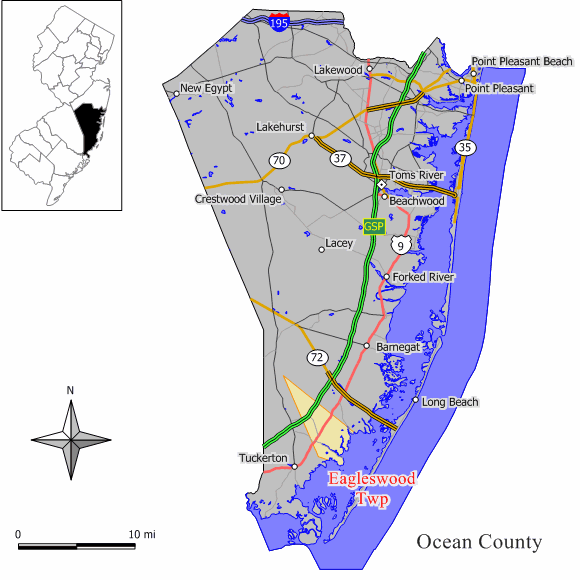
- Location of Eagleswood Township in Ocean County highlighted in yellow (right). Inset map: Location of Ocean County in New Jersey highlighted in black (left).

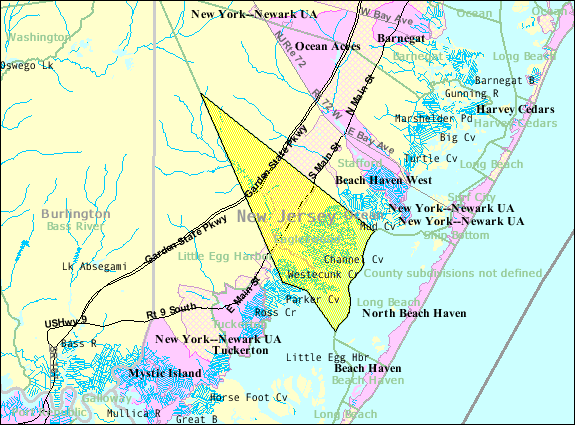
- Census Bureau map of Eagleswood Township, New Jersey

- Location in Ocean County Location in New Jersey Location in the United States
- Coordinates: 39.647182°N 74.284599°W
- Country: United States
- state: New Jersey
- County: Ocean
- Incorporated: March 17, 1874

Government
  - Type: Township
  - Body: Township Committee
  - Mayor: Michael J. Pasternak (R, term ends December 31, 2026)
  - Administrator / Municipal clerk: Destiny Reynolds

Area
  - Total: 18.96 sq mi (49.11 km^{2})
  - Land: 16.10 sq mi (41.71 km^{2})
  - Water: 2.86 sq mi (7.41 km^{2}) 15.08%
  - Rank: 149th of 565 in state 14th of 33 in county
- Elevation: 13 ft (4.0 m)

Population (2020)
  - Total: 1,722
  - Estimate (2023): 1,783
  - Rank: 499th of 565 in state 24th of 33 in county
  - Density: 106.9/sq mi (41.3/km^{2})
  - Rank: 537th of 565 in state 33rd of 33 in county
- Time zone: UTC−05:00 (Eastern (EST))
  - Summer (DST): UTC−04:00 (Eastern (EDT))
- ZIP Code: 08092 – West Creek
- Area code: 609 Exchanges: 294, 296, 697, 812, 978
- FIPS code: 3402918670
- GNIS feature ID: 0882068
- Website: www.eagleswoodtwpnj.us

Eagleswood Township is a township in Ocean County, in the U.S. state of New Jersey. As of the 2020 United States census, the township's population was 1,722, the highest recorded in any decennial count and an increase of 119 (+7.4%) from the 2010 census count of 1,603, which in turn reflected an increase of 162 (+11.2%) from the 1,441 counted in the 2000 census.

Eagleswood Township was incorporated as a township by an act of the New Jersey Legislature on March 17, 1874, from portions of Stafford Township. Portions of the township were taken to form Beach Haven (November 11, 1890) and Long Beach Township (March 23, 1899).

== Geography ==
According to the United States Census Bureau, the township had a total area of 18.96 square miles (49.11 km^{2}), including 16.10 square miles (41.71 km^{2}) of land and 2.86 square miles (7.41 km^{2}) of water (15.08%).

Unincorporated communities, localities and place names located partially or completely within the township include Coxs, Cox's Crossing, Coxstown, Dinner Point, Horse Point, Mud Cove, Parker Cove, Spraguetown, Stafford Forge, Staffordville and West Creek.

The township borders the Ocean County municipalities of Little Egg Harbor Township, Long Beach Township and Stafford Township.

== Demographics ==
Historical population
Census	Pop.	Note	%±
1880	592		—
1890	791		33.6%
1900	563	*	−28.8%
1910	550		−2.3%
1920	420		−23.6%
1930	483		15.0%
1940	551		14.1%
1950	623		13.1%
1960	766		23.0%
1970	823		7.4%
1980	1,009		22.6%
1990	1,476		46.3%
2000	1,441		−2.4%
2010	1,603		11.2%
2020	1,722		7.4%
2023 (est.)	1,783		3.5%
Population sources: 1880–2000; 1880–1920 1880–1890; 1890–1910 1910–1930; 1940–2000 2000; 2010 2020 * = Lost territory in previous decade.

=== 2010 census ===
The 2010 United States census counted 1,603 people, 621 households, and 454 families in the township. The population density was 99.8 inhabitants per square mile (38.5/km^{2}). There were 760 housing units at an average density of 47.3 per square mile (18.3/km^{2}). The racial makeup was 96.44% (1,546) White, 0.87% (14) Black or African American, 0.06% (1) Native American, 0.62% (10) Asian, 0.00% (0) Pacific Islander, 1.00% (16) from other races, and 1.00% (16) from two or more races. Hispanic or Latino of any race were 3.37% (54) of the population.

Of the 621 households, 30.0% had children under the age of 18; 58.6% were married couples living together; 8.2% had a female householder with no husband present and 26.9% were non-families. Of all households, 22.7% were made up of individuals and 7.9% had someone living alone who was 65 years of age or older. The average household size was 2.58 and the average family size was 3.00.

21.7% of the population were under the age of 18, 8.3% from 18 to 24, 23.1% from 25 to 44, 33.3% from 45 to 64, and 13.5% who were 65 years of age or older. The median age was 43.1 years. For every 100 females, the population had 107.6 males. For every 100 females ages 18 and older there were 102.4 males.

The Census Bureau's 2006–2010 American Community Survey showed that (in 2010 inflation-adjusted dollars) median household income was $60,221 (with a margin of error of +/− $4,757) and the median family income was $70,313 (+/− $11,006). Males had a median income of $49,875 (+/− $7,215) versus $38,036 (+/− $8,952) for females. The per capita income for the borough was $28,135 (+/− $2,836). About 4.8% of families and 6.2% of the population were below the poverty line, including 5.5% of those under age 18 and 1.4% of those age 65 or over.

=== 2000 census ===
As of the 2000 United States census there were 1,441 people, 546 households, and 394 families residing in the township. The population density was 88.0 inhabitants per square mile (34.0/km^{2}). There were 693 housing units at an average density of 42.3 per square mile (16.3/km^{2}). The racial makeup of the township was 98.96% White, 0.07% African American, 0.28% Native American, 0.21% Asian, and 0.49% from two or more races. Hispanic or Latino of any race were 1.11% of the population.

There were 546 households, out of which 32.2% had children under the age of 18 living with them, 60.3% were married couples living together, 8.1% had a female householder with no husband present, and 27.7% were non-families. 22.3% of all households were made up of individuals, and 10.6% had someone living alone who was 65 years of age or older. The average household size was 2.64 and the average family size was 3.11.

In the township the population was spread out, with 24.7% under the age of 18, 6.7% from 18 to 24, 29.5% from 25 to 44, 24.7% from 45 to 64, and 14.4% who were 65 years of age or older. The median age was 39 years. For every 100 females, there were 101.5 males. For every 100 females age 18 and over, there were 100.2 males.

The median income for a household in the township was $38,625, and the median income for a family was $49,453. Males had a median income of $36,375 versus $26,654 for females. The per capita income for the township was $20,617. About 2.2% of families and 3.5% of the population were below the poverty line, including 3.2% of those under age 18 and 5.7% of those age 65 or over.

== Government ==
=== Local government ===
Eagleswood Township is governed under the Township form of New Jersey municipal government, one of 141 (of the 564) municipalities statewide that use this form, the second-most commonly used form of government in the state. The governing body is a three-member Township Committee, whose members are elected directly by the voters at-large in partisan elections to serve three-year terms of office on a staggered basis, with one seat coming up for election each year as part of the November general election in a three-year cycle. At an annual reorganization meeting, the Township Committee selects one of its members to serve as Mayor and another as Deputy Mayor.

As of 2024, members of the Eagleswood Township Committee are Mayor Debra A. Rivas (R, term on committee and as mayor ends December 31, 2024), Deputy Mayor Michael J. Pasternak (R, term on committee ends 2025; term as deputy mayor ends 2024) and Michelle Sysol (R, 2026).

==== Emergency services ====
Eagleswood Township is served by Great Bay Regional Volunteer EMS, which also provides primary 911 emergency medical services for the residents of Little Egg Harbor Township and Bass River Township.

Since Eagleswood Township does not maintain its own police department, police services are provided by troopers from the New Jersey State Police Troop C, which maintains a barrack within the township.

=== Federal, state and county representation ===
Eagleswood Township is located in the 2nd Congressional District and is part of New Jersey's 9th state legislative district. Prior to the 2010 Census, Eagleswood Township had been part of the 3rd Congressional District, a change made by the New Jersey Redistricting Commission that took effect in January 2013, based on the results of the November 2012 general elections.

For the 119th United States Congress, New Jersey's 2nd congressional district is represented by Jeff Van Drew (R, Dennis Township). New Jersey is represented in the United States Senate by Democrats Cory Booker (Newark, term ends 2027) and Andy Kim (Moorestown, term ends 2031).

For the 2026–2027 session, the 9th legislative district of the New Jersey Legislature is represented in the State Senate by Carmen Amato (R, Berkeley Township) and in the General Assembly by Greg Myhre (R, Stafford Township) and Brian E. Rumpf (R, Little Egg Harbor Township).

Ocean County is governed by a Board of County Commissioners composed of five members who are elected on an at-large basis in partisan elections and serving staggered three-year terms of office, with either one or two seats coming up for election each year as part of the November general election. At an annual reorganization held in the beginning of January, the board chooses a director and a deputy director from among its members. As of 2025, Ocean County's Commissioners (with party affiliation, term-end year and residence) are:

John P. Kelly (R, 2025, Eagleswood Township), Virginia E. Haines (R, 2025, Toms River), Robert Arace (R, Manchester Township, 2027) Jennifer Bacchione (R, Berkeley Township, 2027) and Frank Sadeghi (R, 2026, Toms River).

Constitutional officers elected on a countywide basis are: Clerk Scott M. Colabella (R, 2025, Barnegat Light), Sheriff Michael G. Mastronardy (R, 2025; Toms River) and Surrogate Jeffrey Moran (R, 2028, Beachwood).

=== Politics ===
As of March 2011, there were a total of 1,115 registered voters in Eagleswood Township, of which 165 (14.8%) were registered as Democrats, 466 (41.8%) were registered as Republicans and 482 (43.2%) were registered as Unaffiliated. There were 2 voters registered as Libertarians or Greens. Among the township's 2010 Census population, 69.6% (vs. 63.2% in Ocean County) were registered to vote, including 88.8% of those ages 18 and over (vs. 82.6% countywide).

Gubernatorial election results for Eagleswood Township
Year	Republican		Democratic		Third party(ies)	
Year	No.	%	No.	%	No.	%
2025	574	70.95%	230	28.43%	5	0.62%
2021	518	75.51%	163	23.76%	5	0.73%
2017	310	65.26%	148	31.16%	17	3.58%
2013	345	72.63%	116	24.42%	14	2.95%
2009	351	63.82%	149	27.09%	50	9.09%
2005	271	53.66%	198	39.21%	36	7.13%

In the 2012 presidential election, Republican Mitt Romney received 61.7% of the vote (455 cast), ahead of Democrat Barack Obama with 37.1% (274 votes), and other candidates with 1.2% (9 votes), among the 742 ballots cast by the township's 1,180 registered voters (4 ballots were spoiled), for a turnout of 62.9%. In the 2008 presidential election, Republican John McCain received 58.8% of the vote (473 cast), ahead of Democrat Barack Obama with 38.7% (311 votes) and other candidates with 0.9% (7 votes), among the 804 ballots cast by the township's 1,169 registered voters, for a turnout of 68.8%. In the 2004 presidential election, Republican George W. Bush received 62.6% of the vote (456 ballots cast), outpolling Democrat John Kerry with 35.8% (261 votes) and other candidates with 0.8% (8 votes), among the 729 ballots cast by the township's 997 registered voters, for a turnout percentage of 73.1.

Presidential Elections Results
Year	Republican	Democratic	Third Parties
2024	73.2% 765	25.6% 267	1.2% 14
2020	68.4% 702	29.3% 301	2.3% 19
2016	69.9% 585	26.3% 220	3.8% 32
2012	61.7% 455	37.1% 274	1.2% 9
2008	58.8% 473	38.7% 311	0.9% 7
2004	62.6% 456	35.8% 261	0.8% 8

In the 2013 gubernatorial election, Republican Chris Christie received 72.6% of the vote (345 cast), ahead of Democrat Barbara Buono with 24.4% (116 votes), and other candidates with 2.9% (14 votes), among the 482 ballots cast by the township's 1,144 registered voters (7 ballots were spoiled), for a turnout of 42.1%. In the 2009 gubernatorial election, Republican Chris Christie received 62.1% of the vote (351 ballots cast), ahead of Democrat Jon Corzine with 26.4% (149 votes), Independent Chris Daggett with 6.5% (37 votes) and other candidates with 2.3% (13 votes), among the 565 ballots cast by the township's 1,154 registered voters, yielding a 49.0% turnout.

United States Senate election results for Eagleswood Township1
Year	Republican		Democratic		Third party(ies)	
Year	No.	%	No.	%	No.	%
2024	715	72.44%	265	26.85%	7	0.71%
2018	472	68.80%	187	27.26%	27	3.94%
2012	429	61.99%	245	35.40%	18	2.60%
2006	276	59.61%	169	36.50%	18	3.89%

United States Senate election results for Eagleswood Township2
Year	Republican		Democratic		Third party(ies)	
Year	No.	%	No.	%	No.	%
2020	695	69.22%	298	29.68%	11	1.10%
2014	253	65.89%	124	32.29%	7	1.82%
2013	180	70.59%	75	29.41%	0	0.00%
2008	436	59.16%	288	39.08%	13	1.76%

== Education ==
The Eagleswood Township School District serves students in public school for grades pre-kindergarten through sixth grade at Eagleswood Township Elementary School. As of the 2022–23 school year, the district, comprised of one school, had an enrollment of 143 students and 16.6 classroom teachers (on an FTE basis), for a student–teacher ratio of 8.6:1. In the 2016–17 school year, Eagleswood had the 20th smallest enrollment of any school district in the state, with 141 students.

Public school students in seventh through twelfth grades attend the schools of the Pinelands Regional School District, which also serves students from Bass River Township, Little Egg Harbor Township and Tuckerton Borough. Schools in the district (with 2022–23 enrollment data from the National Center for Education Statistics) are Pinelands Regional Junior High School with 520 students in grades 7-8 and Pinelands Regional High School with 1,069 students in grades 9-12.

== Transportation ==
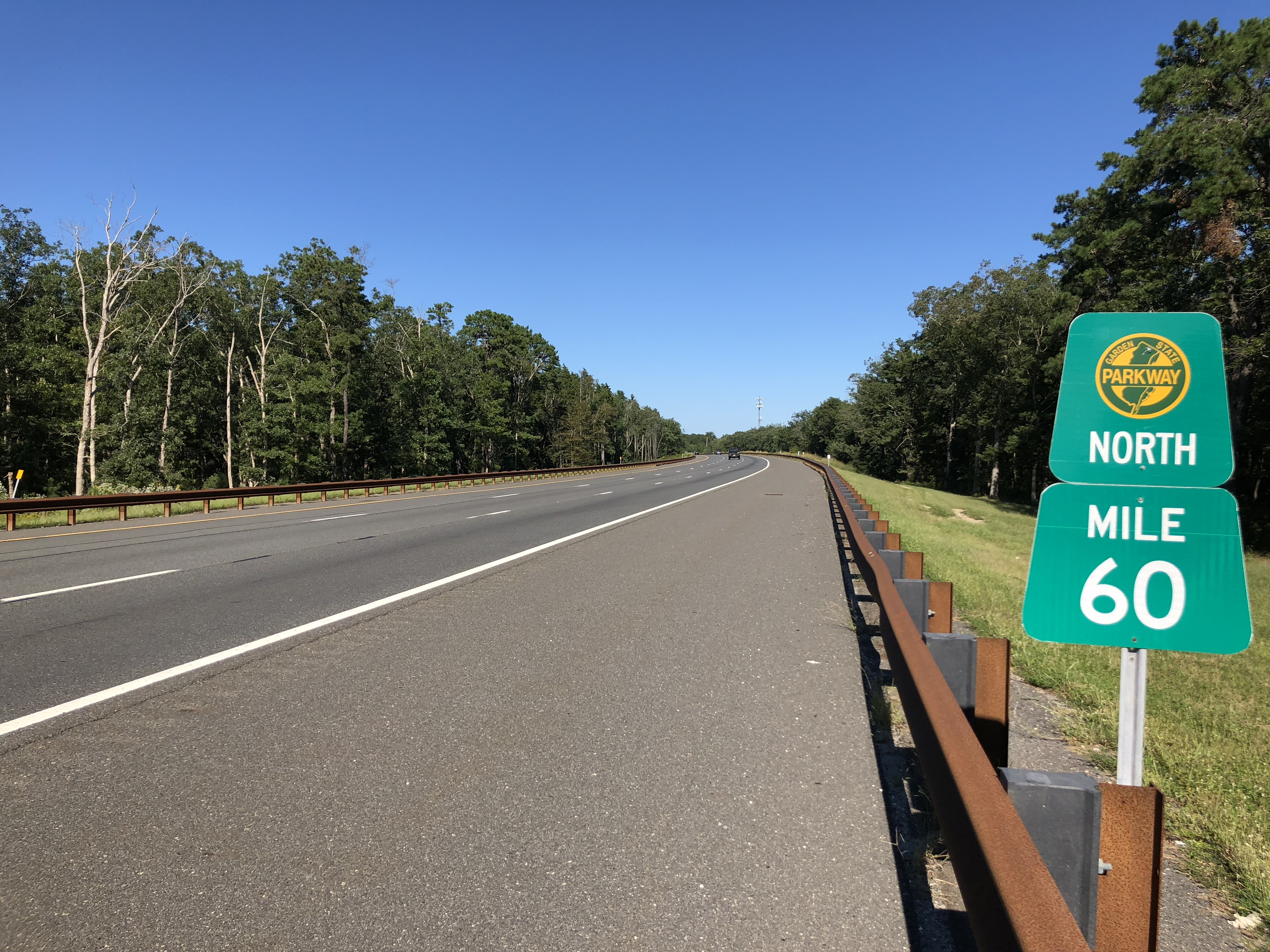
The northbound Garden State Parkway in Eagleswood Township

=== Roads and highways ===
As of May 2010, the township had a total of 25.04 miles (40.30 km) of roadways, of which 11.19 miles (18.01 km) were maintained by the municipality, 8.87 miles (14.27 km) by Ocean County, 3.01 miles (4.84 km) by the New Jersey Department of Transportation and 1.97 miles (3.17 km) by the New Jersey Turnpike Authority.

The Garden State Parkway is the most prominent road passing through Eagleswood Township. However, there are no exits within the township, with the nearest access points being at Interchange 58 (County Route 539) in Little Egg Harbor Township and Interchange 63 (New Jersey Route 72) in Stafford Township. U.S. Route 9 is the main highway directly serving Eagleswood.

=== Public transportation ===
NJ Transit offers local bus service between the township and Atlantic City on the 559 route.

Ocean Ride local service is offered on route OC6.

== Notable people ==
People who were born in, residents of, or otherwise closely associated with Eagleswood Township include:

- John T. Hendrickson Jr. (1923–1999), politician who represented the 9th Legislative District in the New Jersey General Assembly from 1982 to 1989
- George Inness (1825–1894), landscape painter
- Paul Marshall Johnson Jr. (1955–2004), helicopter engineer who was taken hostage by militants in 2004 and had his murder in Saudi Arabia by Al-Qaeda in the Arabian Peninsula recorded on video tape
