= Great Bay Regional Volunteer EMS =

Great Bay Regional Volunteer EMS "Squad 85"
- The Star of Life
- Established: 1999
- Headquarters: Squad 85 - Little Egg Harbor, NJ
- Jurisdiction: Little Egg Harbor, Bass River, Eagleswood
- Employees: 54
- BLS or ALS: BLS
- Ambulances: 4
- Responses: approx 3000
- Website: www.greatbayems.org

Great Bay Regional Volunteer Emergency Medical Services (EMS) is a Volunteer Emergency Medical Services in the southern Ocean County area and part of Burlington County in New Jersey, United States. Great Bay EMS provides primary 911 services for the residents of Little Egg Harbor Township, Bass River Township and Eagleswood Township.

== History ==
Great Bay Regional Volunteer EMS, was created in May 1999 from the previous Tuckerton First Aid Squad in Tuckerton, New Jersey. The agency worked out of a small construction trailer on Little Egg Harbor Township property for two years before moving onto its permanent property in the township's West Tuckerton Section. Great Bay Regional Volunteer EMS celebrated the grand opening of its building on June 18, 2005, with a parade and ceremony.

== Staff ==
Great Bay Regional Volunteer EMS has 54 members including Emergency Medical Technicians, First Responders, and other support staff. As listed on the Great Bay Regional Volunteer EMS website. These are categorized as follows:

- EMTs - 39 position(s).
- Drivers - 14 position(s).

They are led by Chief David Inman Jr., the first leader in the history of the organization elected into the position by membership instead of being appointed by a board of trustees without due regard to the operation of the organization.

== Operations ==
Service is provided to a residential population of approximately 22,413 people.

Great Bay Regional EMS serves three townships in 9-1-1 emergency calls, and in town events such as: boat races, parades, and various other types of events.

The service also provides Fire Department Rehabilitation for firefighters performing their functions.

== Community involvement ==
Great Bay Regional Volunteer EMS provides a Senior Expo every year to assist the area's senior citizens with keeping track of their medications, giving them positive reinforcement and providing free blood pressure screenings.

The service also provides the local area opportunities to become certified and trained in all levels of Cardiopulmonary resuscitation (CPR) and First Aid.
