= Charles J. Irwin =

American politician (1930–2005)

Member of the New Jersey General Assembly from the 9th at-large district
- In office January 9, 1968 – April 5, 1971
- Preceded by: District created
- Succeeded by: District abolished

Personal details
- Born: June 9, 1930 Brooklyn, New York, U.S.
- Died: March 12, 2005 (aged 74) Toms River, New Jersey, U.S.
- Party: Republican

Charles Julian Irwin (June 9, 1930 – March 12, 2005) was an American Republican Party politician who served in the New Jersey General Assembly from the 9th at-large district from 1968 to April 5, 1971. He had resigned to become the executive director of the New Jersey Office of Consumer Protection.

== Early life and education ==
Born in Brooklyn, New York, on June 9, 1930, he grew up in Jersey City and Bergen County. After graduating from Teaneck High School in 1948, he attended the Insurance Society of New York and the New York State College of Forestry. He first received a bachelor of arts in economics from Syracuse University in 1955. He then served in the U.S. Army for two years becoming a captain. Following his military service, Irwin graduated from Harvard Law School receiving a J.D in 1960. An attorney by trade, he worked mainly on environmental law.

== Political career ==
A resident of Mountainside, New Jersey, he was elected in 1967 to an at-large seat in the New Jersey General Assembly representing Union County, New Jersey, and was re-elected in 1969. He resigned from office on April 5, 1971, after being nominated by Governor William T. Cahill to become the first executive director of the New Jersey Office of Consumer Protection. He stepped down from office at the end of 1972 to resume his legal career and was succeeded by Millicent Fenwick.

In 1990, Democratic governor James Florio appointed Irwin to a seat on the Casino Reinvestment Development Authority. Following his term, returned to practice law. He died on March 12, 2005.

== Death ==
A resident of Toms River, New Jersey, he died at his home there on March 12, 2005, due to multiple myeloma.

== Election results ==
New Jersey general election, 1967
Party	Candidate	Votes	%
Republican	Charles J. Irwin	84,750	58.3
Democratic	Everett C. Lattimore	57,427	39.5
No Unnecessary Taxes	Eugene Daddio	3,188	2.2
Total votes		145,365	100.0

New Jersey general election, 1969
Party	Candidate	Votes	%
Republican	Charles J. Irwin	88,195	49.7
Democratic	John T. Connor, Jr.	87,061	49.0
National Conservative	Harold J. Kauffmann	2,311	1.3
Total votes		177,567	100.0
