= Roger Bodman =

American politician

Roger A. Bodman

New Jersey Commissioner of Labor
- In office 1982–1985

New Jersey Commissioner of Transportation
- In office 1985–1986
- Preceded by: John Sheridan
- Succeeded by: Hazel Gluck

Personal details
- Spouse: Laura Slomka
- Education: Ohio University (1974)

Roger A. Bodman (born 1952) is an American Republican Party politician and political strategist who served in the cabinet of New Jersey Governor Thomas Kean.

Early in his career, Bodman served as district office manager for the late New Jersey Congresswoman Millicent Fenwick and as chief of staff for former New Jersey Congressman James Courter. In 1981, he was selected as manager of Tom Kean's campaign for governor. Following Governor Kean's victory, Bodman was named to two cabinet posts. As the State Commissioner of Labor, he implemented extensive legislative reforms of the unemployment insurance program. Later, as the State Commissioner of Transportation, he was the chief advisor to the governor on transportation matters. He also served as chairman of New Jersey Transit.

In 1987, Bodman was appointed by the governor to chair the Study Commission on Regulatory Efficiency, a role that earned him the Alliance for Action's Eagle Award. In 1988, he served as vice chairman of the New Jersey Bush for President committee. A native of Bernardsville, New Jersey, Bodman graduated cum laude from Ohio University in 1974 with a degree in political science. Bodman is also a visiting professor at Rutgers University's Eagleton Institute of Politics.

== Career ==
Bodman grew up in Bernardsville, New Jersey, near where his father worked for AT&T as an engineer. He graduated in 1970 from Bernardsville High School.

He is a 1974 graduate of Ohio University. Bodman began his political career as a driver for U.S. Rep. Millicent Fenwick in her first campaign for Congress in 1974. He later ran Fenwick's District Office. In 1978, Bodman managed the successful campaign of Jim Courter for Congress against two-term Democratic Rep. Helen Meyner, the wife of former New Jersey Governor Robert Meyner. Bodman later became Courter's Chief of Staff. In 1981, Bodman was the campaign manager for Thomas Kean in his winning campaign for Governor of New Jersey. Bodman served in Kean's cabinet, first as the Commissioner of Labor from 1982 to 1985, and then as Commissioner of Transportation from 1985 to 1986. He resigned from the cabinet in 1987 to start a lobbying firm.
