= Christopher J. Connors =

Member of the New Jersey Senate

Member of the New Jersey Senate from the 9th district
- In office January 8, 2008 – January 9, 2024
- Preceded by: Leonard T. Connors
- Succeeded by: Carmen Amato

Member of the New Jersey General Assembly from the 9th district
- In office January 9, 1990 – January 8, 2008 Serving with Jeffrey Moran and Brian E. Rumpf
- Preceded by: John T. Hendrickson Jr.
- Succeeded by: Daniel Van Pelt

Personal details
- Born: June 26, 1956 (age 70) Ridgewood, New Jersey
- Party: Republican
- Spouse: Deborah
- Children: 2
- Education: Stockton State College (BS); Rutgers University, Newark (MPA); Rutgers University, Camden (JD)
- Occupation: Attorney
- Website: Legislative Website

Christopher J. Connors (born June 26, 1956) is a New Jersey Republican Party politician, who served in the Senate from January 8, 2008 to January 9, 2024, where he represented the 9th Legislative District. He served in the General Assembly from January 9, 1990 to January 8, 2008.

== Early life ==
Born in Ridgewood, New Jersey on June 26, 1956, Connors graduated from Southern Regional High School. He received a B.S. degree in 1978 from Stockton State College (now Stockton University) in Business Administration, an M.P.A. in 1988 from Rutgers University in Public Administration and was awarded a J.D. in 1995 from the Rutgers School of Law - Camden in Camden. He resides in the Forked River section of Lacey Township. Connors is an attorney and is a partner at Dasti, Murphy, McGuckin, Ulaky, Koutsouris & Connors.

== Early Political Career ==
The son of Leonard T. Connors, he grew up in Surf City, New Jersey and gained his first exposure to politics as a child while helping his father run for city council. He moved to Toms River in 1978 and to Lacey Township four years later, where he was first encouraged to run on his own for elected office. Though initially reluctant to run for election, Connors said that "perhaps the urge to enter politics was a latent kind of urge for me". Connors served on the Lacey Township Committee from 1985 to 1990 and was Mayor of Lacey Township from 1986 to 1989. Connors was Executive Director from 1988 to 1989 and was Deputy Executive Director from 1982 to 1988 of the New Jersey Commission on Capital Budgeting and Planning during the Administration of former Governor Thomas Kean.

== New Jersey Assembly ==
Connors was elected to the Assembly in 1989 and was sworn in on January 9, 1990. He served as Assistant Majority Leader of the Assembly from 1992 to 1996. He sponsored a law enacted in January 2000 requiring installation of ignition interlock devices in cars of repeat drunk driving offenders and of a 1998 law requiring criminal background checks for nurse aides and home personal care licensing applicants.

== New Jersey Senate ==
Connors succeeded his father, Leonard T. Connors, who served in the New Jersey Senate from 1982 to 2008.

In January 2023, Connors announced that he would not be a candidate for reelection after 33 years of service in the New Jersey Legislature.

== Electoral history ==
=== Senate ===
New Jersey general election, 2017
Party	Candidate	Votes	%	±%
Republican	Christopher J. Connors	41,438	64.6	▼6.2
Democratic	Brian Corley White	22,717	35.4	▲6.2
Total votes		'64,155'	'100.0'	

New Jersey State Senate elections, 2013
Party	Candidate	Votes	%
Republican	Christopher J. Connors (incumbent)	46,949	70.8
Democratic	Anthony Mazella	19,365	29.2
Republican hold			

New Jersey State Senate elections, 2011
Party	Candidate	Votes	%
Republican	Christopher J. Connors (incumbent)	32,027	64.9
Democratic	Dorothy A. Ryan	17,320	35.1
Republican hold			

New Jersey State Senate elections, 2007
Party	Candidate	Votes	%
Republican	Christopher J. Connors	35,504	62.3
Democratic	Russell K. Corby	21,524	37.7
Republican hold			

=== Assembly ===
New Jersey general election, 2005
Party	Candidate	Votes	%	±%
Republican	Christopher J. Connors	47,863	32.1	▼0.6
Republican	Brian E. Rumpf	44,761	30.0	▲1.3
Democratic	Dolores J. Coulter	29,365	19.7	▲0.2
Democratic	James Den Uyl	27,060	18.2	▼0.9
Total votes		'149,049'	'100.0'	

New Jersey general election, 2003
Party	Candidate	Votes	%	±%
Republican	Christopher J. Connors	35,580	32.7	▲2.6
Republican	Brian E. Rumpf	31,307	28.7	▼0.9
Democratic	Dolores J. Coulter	21,282	19.5	▼1.3
Democratic	Peter A. Terranova	20,763	19.1	▼0.4
Total votes		'108,932'	'100.0'	

New Jersey general election, 2001
Party	Candidate	Votes	%
Republican	Christopher J. Connors	44,004	30.1
Republican	Jeffrey W. Moran	43,178	29.6
Democratic	John F. Ryan	30,385	20.8
Democratic	Robert DiBella	28,521	19.5
Total votes		146,088	100.0

New Jersey general election, 1999
Party	Candidate	Votes	%	±%
Republican	Christopher J. Connors	31,492	30.6	▼1.3
Republican	Jeffrey W. Moran	31,182	30.3	▼1.6
Democratic	S. Karl Mohel	18,698	18.2	▲1.1
Democratic	Jack Ryan	18,640	18.1	▲1.7
Conservative	John N. Cardello	1,548	1.5	▲0.1
Conservative	James W. Eissing	1,335	1.3	▼0.1
Total votes		'102,895'	'100.0'	

New Jersey general election, 1997
Party	Candidate	Votes	%	±%
Republican	Jeffrey W. Moran	47,232	31.9	▼0.5
Republican	Christopher J. Connors	47,205	31.9	▼0.8
Democratic	Sharon Fumei	25,398	17.1	▲2.5
Democratic	Michael G. Carrig	24,298	16.4	▲1.8
Conservative	James W. Eissing	2,015	1.4	▼1.4
Conservative	Nancy L. Eissing	2,009	1.4	▼1.5
Total votes		'148,157'	'100.0'	

New Jersey general election, 1995
Party	Candidate	Votes	%	±%
Republican	Christopher J. Connors	33,394	32.7	▲0.2
Republican	Jeffrey W. Moran	33,113	32.4	▲0.2
Democratic	Miriam Wolkofsky	14,979	14.6	▼3.0
Democratic	Matt Cutano	14,959	14.6	▼3.0
Conservative	Nancy L. Eissing	2,992	2.9	N/A
Conservative	Leonard P. Marshall	2,835	2.8	N/A
Total votes		'102,272'	'100.0'	

New Jersey general election, 1993
Party	Candidate	Votes	%	±%
Republican	Christopher J. Connors	49,885	32.5	▼2.2
Republican	Jeffrey W. Moran	49,363	32.2	▼2.4
Democratic	Thomas Woolsey	27,046	17.6	▲2.1
Democratic	Robert K. Smith	26,979	17.6	▲2.4
Total votes		'153,273'	'100.0'	

New Jersey general election, 1989
Party	Candidate	Votes	%	±%
Republican	Christopher J. Connors	38,013	25.8	▼5.9
Republican	Jeffrey W. Moran	37,604	25.5	▼5.2
Democratic	Lawrence J. Williams	35,933	24.4	▲5.3
Democratic	Joseph Meglino	35,753	24.3	▲5.7
Total votes		'147,303'	'100.0'	

New Jersey Senate
Preceded by Leonard T. Connors	Member of the New Jersey Senate for the 9th District; January 8, 2008–January 9, 2024	Succeeded by Carmen Amato
New Jersey General Assembly
Preceded by John T. Hendrickson Jr.	Member of the New Jersey General Assembly for the 9th District; January 9, 1990–January 8, 2008; With: Jeffrey Moran, Brian E. Rumpf	Succeeded by Daniel Van Pelt
