= Hendrickson =

Hendrickson is a surname meaning "Son of Hendrick, Son of Henry, and Son of Hendrie," It may refer to:

== Things ==
- Hendrickson Holdings, a United States manufacturer of truck suspensions
- 20317 Hendrickson, a main-belt asteroid
- Hendrickson Organ Company, a manufacturer of pipe organs
- Hendrickson Publishers, an academic Christian publisher

== Places ==
- Hendrickson Township, Hubbard County, Minnesota, United States
- Hendrickson, Missouri, United States

== People ==
- Adam Hendrickson, New York City Ballet soloist
- Ben Hendrickson (born 1981), American baseball pitcher
- Benjamin Hendrickson (1950–2006), American actor
- Craig Hendrickson (born 1968), Canadian-American football player
- Darby Hendrickson (born 1972), American ice hockey centre
- Darin Hendrickson, American baseball coach
- Dwight Hendrickson, fictional character in Haven
- Elizabeth Hendrickson (born 1979), American actress
- Ezra Hendrickson (born 1972), Vincentian footballer
- Horace Hendrickson (1910–2004), American football coach
- Jack Hendrickson (1936–2016), Canadian ice hockey player
- John Hendrickson (disambiguation), several people
- Mark Hendrickson (born 1974), American professional athlete
- Robert C. Hendrickson (1898–1964), American politician
- Robert Hendrickson (director) (1944–2016), American documentary filmmaker
- Scott Hendrickson (born 1970), Canadian football player
- Steve Hendrickson (1966–2021), American football linebacker
- Sue Hendrickson (born 1949), American paleontologist
- Trey Hendrickson (born 1994), American football player
- Virginia Hendrickson Irvin (née Virginia Gray Hendrickson; 1904–1992), American painter
- Waino Edward Hendrickson (1896–1983), American politician
