= John Hendrickson =

John Hendrickson may refer to:

- John H. Hendrickson (1872–1925), American sport shooter
- John T. Hendrickson Jr. (1923–1999), American politician in the New Jersey General Assembly
- John Hendrickson (businessman), American businessman
- Jack Hendrickson (1936–2016), Canadian ice hockey player
