= Surf City Yacht Club =

- Burgee
- Short name: SCYC
- Founded: 1940
- Location: 399 N 9th St, Surf City, New Jersey 08008
- Website: scyc-nj.org

The Surf City Yacht Club (SCYC) is a private yacht club located on Long Beach Island (Surf City, New Jersey), on Barnegat Bay.

== History ==
The Surf City Yacht Club was formally incorporated as a non-profit club under the laws of New Jersey on September 26, 1940, after a group of young men had been getting together since 1894 to create an informal organization to promote aquatic sports. They purchased lot 36 fronting south side of 9th street in 1937 for $200, acquiring lots 34 and 35 in 1939 to expand their space.

== Fleets ==
Junior sailing and interclubs racing fleets include Optimist, Sunfish, Laser, 420 and Windsurfing. There are also Lightning, Snipe and Mariner senior fleets.

== Regattas ==
SCYC is the usual site of the Snipe Atlantic Coast Championships.
