= Daniel Van Pelt =

American politician

Member of the New Jersey General Assembly from the 9th district
- In office January 8, 2008 – July 31, 2009 Serving with Brian E. Rumpf
- Preceded by: Christopher J. Connors
- Succeeded by: DiAnne Gove

Personal details
- Born: September 4, 1964 (age 62) Elizabeth, New Jersey
- Party: Republican
- Education: The College of New Jersey (BS); Regent University (MA)

Daniel M. Van Pelt (born September 4, 1964) is an American Republican politician, who served in the New Jersey General Assembly from January 8, 2008, until July 31, 2009, when he resigned after being arrested in connection with Operation Bid Rig on federal corruption charges for allegedly accepting a $10,000 bribe. He was later convicted and sentenced to 41 months in prison. In the Assembly, he represented the 9th legislative district.

== Education and career ==
Born in Elizabeth, New Jersey, Van Pelt graduated in 1982 from Toms River High School East. He received a B.S. from The College of New Jersey with a major in Criminal Justice and an M.A. from Regent University in Public Policy and Government. He was the Township Administrator of Lumberton Township, New Jersey, a position that paid him an annual salary of $85,000. The Lumberton Township Committee fired him on July 25, 2009, in the wake of his arrest on federal corruption charges.

== Government service ==
Van Pelt served on the governing body of Ocean Township from 1998 until February 2009, most of those years as the township's mayor.

He simultaneously held a seat in the New Jersey General Assembly and as Mayor in 2008. This dual position, often called double dipping, is allowed under a grandfather clause in the state law enacted by the New Jersey Legislature and signed into law by Governor of New Jersey Jon Corzine in September 2007 that prevents dual-office-holding but allows those who had held both positions as of February 1, 2008, to retain both posts.

Van Pelt had served on the Assembly's Environment and Solid Waste Committee and the Military and Veterans' Affairs Committee. Assembly Speaker Joseph J. Roberts removed him from those positions the day of Van Pelt's arrest.

== Operation Bid Rig ==
Van Pelt was one of 44 individuals arrested on July 23, 2009, as part of Operation Bid Rig, a joint operation of the FBI, IRS, and the United States Attorney for the District of New Jersey into corruption and money laundering that began with investigations into counterfeit merchandise and international money laundering. Van Pelt was charged with accepting a $10,000 bribe.

Van Pelt resigned from the Assembly on July 31, more than a week after his arrest. He maintained his innocence, but said that his "current situation would only serve as a distraction, and I would do a disservice to those who elected me to do a job." Van Pelt also withdrew from his re-election bid.

On August 12, Republican county committee members selected Long Beach Township Commissioner DiAnne C. Gove to fill the remainder of Van Pelt's term and to take his spot on the ballot.

Van Pelt was convicted on May 19, 2010, of accepting a $10,000 bribe to provide environmental permits for an Ocean Township development project. On November 19, 2010, he was sentenced to 41 months in federal prison. He was released in December 2013.
