= New Jersey's 9th legislative district =

American legislative district

- Senator: Carmen Amato (R)
- Assembly members: Brian E. Rumpf (R); Greg Myhre (R)
- Registration: 41.59% Republican; 22.40% Democratic; 34.81% unaffiliated
- Demographics: 83.2% White; 3.8% Black/African American; 0.2% Native American; 2.8% Asian; 0.0% Hawaiian/Pacific Islander; 3.1% Other race; 6.9% Two or more races; 9.1% Hispanic
- Population: 235,539
- Voting-age population: 194,652
- Registered voters: 193,047

New Jersey's 9th legislative district is one of 40 in the New Jersey Legislature, covering the Ocean County municipalities of Barnegat Township, Barnegat Light Borough, Beach Haven Borough, Beachwood Borough, Berkeley Township, Eagleswood Township, Harvey Cedars Borough, Lacey Township, Lakehurst, New Jersey, Little Egg Harbor Township, Long Beach Township, Manchester, Ocean Township, Ocean Gate Borough, Pine Beach Borough, Ship Bottom Borough, Stafford Township, Surf City Borough and Tuckerton Borough.

== Demographic characteristics ==
As of the 2020 United States census, the district had a population of 235,539, of whom 194,652 (82.6%) were of voting age. The racial makeup of the district was 195,976 (83.2%) White, 9,031 (3.8%) African American, 564 (0.2%) Native American, 6,500 (2.8%) Asian, 71 (0.0%) Pacific Islander, 7,247 (3.1%) from some other race, and 16,150 (6.9%) from two or more races. Hispanic or Latino of any race were 21,473 (9.1%) of the population.

The district had 193,047 registered voters as of December 1, 2021, of whom 73,377 (38.0%) were registered as unaffiliated, 70,287 (36.4%) were registered as Republicans, 46,730 (24.2%) were registered as Democrats, and 2,653 (1.4%) were registered to other parties.

== Political representation ==
For the 2026–2027 session, the 9th legislative district of the New Jersey Legislature is represented in the State Senate by Carmen Amato (R, Berkeley Township) and in the General Assembly by Greg Myhre (R, Stafford Township) and Brian E. Rumpf (R, Little Egg Harbor Township).

The legislative district overlaps with New Jersey's 2nd and New Jersey's 4th congressional districts.

== 1965–1973 ==
During the period of time after the 1964 Supreme Court decision in Reynolds v. Sims and before the establishment of a 40-district legislature in 1973, the 9th district encompassed the entirety of Union County. Two Senators were elected in the 1965 election (Republican Nelson Stamler and Democrat Mildred Barry Hughes) while three were elected in the 1967 and 1971 elections. Republicans Nicholas S. LaCorte, Frank X. McDermott, and Matthew John Rinaldo won the 1967 election though LaCorte would resign on December 7, 1970 to become a tax appeals judge. Democrat Jerry Fitzgerald English would win a 1971 special election to complete LaCorte's term. Republicans would win the three seats in the regular 1971 election with Rinaldo, McDermott, and Jerome Epstein receiving the most votes in that election. Following Rinaldo's election to Congress in 1972 elections, Democrat William J. McCloud would be elected to complete Rinaldo's term in the Senate.

In the Assembly, for the 1967, 1969, and 1971 elections, Union County was divided into three districts (9A, 9B, and 9C) that each elected two members of the Assembly. In addition, in the 1967 and 1969 elections, one additional member of the Assembly was elected county-wide.

The members elected to the Assembly from each district are as follows:

Session	District 9A	District 9B	District 9C	District 9 at-large
1968–1969	Joseph J. Higgins (D)	Herbert J. Heilmann (R)	Peter McDonough (R)	Charles J. Irwin (R)
1968–1969	Henry F. Gavan (D)	Herbert H. Kiehn (R)	Hugo Pfaltz (R)	Charles J. Irwin (R)
1970–1971	Joseph J. Higgins (D)	Herbert J. Heilmann (R) (Note: Resigned to become Assistant Commissioner of Labor on December 1, 1970)	Peter McDonough (R)	Charles J. Irwin (R) (Note: Resigned April 5, 1971 to become executive director of the New Jersey Office of Consumer Protection)
1970–1971	Joseph J. Higgins (D)	Elizabeth Cox (R) (Note: Elected in 1971 special election to complete Heilmann's unexpired term)	Peter McDonough (R)	Charles J. Irwin (R)
1970–1971	Henry F. Gavan (D)	Hugo Pfaltz (R)	Herbert H. Kiehn (R)	Charles J. Irwin (R)
1972–1973	Joseph J. Higgins (D)	C. Louis Bassano (R)	Peter McDonough (R)	Seat eliminated
1972–1973	Alexander J. Menza (D)	Herbert H. Kiehn (R)	Arthur Manner (R)	Seat eliminated

== District composition since 1973 ==
Since the creation of 40 equal-population districts statewide in 1973, the 9th district has been based in and around Ocean County. For the 1973 district, the 9th consisted of most of Ocean County (all municipalities except Little Egg Harbor Township, Tuckerton, Manchester Township, Lakehurst, Point Pleasant, and Point Pleasant Beach), Woodland Township in Burlington County, and Millstone Township in Monmouth County. In the 1981 redistricting, the large townships of Lakewood, Brick, and Dover and other nearby small boroughs were removed but the remainder of Ocean County municipalities were added as well as Bass River Township and Burlington County's New Hanover Township, Wrightstown, and North Hanover. Jackson Township and Plumsted Township and the northern Burlington municipalities were shifted out of the 9th in the 1991 redistricting; more of southern Burlington was added including Tabernacle, Woodland, Washington, and Bass River townships and Egg Harbor City in Atlantic County were also added to the district for this decade. In the 2001 redistricting, the Ocean County portion of the district barely changed but only Washington and Bass River townships remained in Burlington County and the municipalities that made up the Atlantic County portion of the district were Hammonton and Folsom.

== Election history ==
Session	Senate	General Assembly	
1974–1975	John F. Russo (D)	John Paul Doyle (D)	Daniel F. Newman (D)
1976–1977	John F. Russo (D)	John Paul Doyle (D)	Daniel F. Newman (D)
1978–1979	John F. Russo (D)	John Paul Doyle (D)	Daniel F. Newman (D)
1980–1981	John F. Russo (D)	John Paul Doyle (D)	Hazel Gluck (R)
1982–1983	Leonard T. Connors (R)	John T. Hendrickson Jr. (R)	Jorge A. Rod (R)
1984–1985	Leonard T. Connors (R)	John T. Hendrickson Jr. (R)	Jorge A. Rod (R)
1984–1985	Leonard T. Connors (R)	John T. Hendrickson Jr. (R)	Jorge A. Rod (D) (Note: Switched parties on August 27, 1985)
1986–1987	Leonard T. Connors (R)	John T. Hendrickson Jr. (R)	Jeffrey Moran (R)
1988–1989	Leonard T. Connors (R)	John T. Hendrickson Jr. (R) (Note: Resigned September 1, 1989 to become part of the Department of Community Affairs)	Jeffrey Moran (R)
1990–1991	Leonard T. Connors (R)	Christopher J. Connors (R)	Jeffrey Moran (R)
1992–1993	Leonard T. Connors (R)	Christopher J. Connors (R)	Jeffrey Moran (R)
1994–1995	Leonard T. Connors (R)	Christopher J. Connors (R)	Jeffrey Moran (R)
1996–1997	Leonard T. Connors (R)	Christopher J. Connors (R)	Jeffrey Moran (R)
1998–1999	Leonard T. Connors (R)	Christopher J. Connors (R)	Jeffrey Moran (R)
2000–2001	Leonard T. Connors (R)	Christopher J. Connors (R)	Jeffrey Moran (R)
2002–2003	Leonard T. Connors (R)	Christopher J. Connors (R)	Jeffrey Moran (R) (Note: Resigned June 17, 2003 to become Ocean County Surrogate)
2002–2003	Leonard T. Connors (R)	Christopher J. Connors (R)	Brian E. Rumpf (R) (Note: Appointed June 23, 2003)
2004–2005	Leonard T. Connors (R)	Christopher J. Connors (R)	Brian E. Rumpf (R)
2006–2007	Leonard T. Connors (R)	Christopher J. Connors (R)	Brian E. Rumpf (R)
2008–2009	Christopher J. Connors (R)	Daniel Van Pelt (R) (Note: Resigned on July 31, 2009 following his arrest in relation to Operation Bid Rig)	Brian E. Rumpf (R)
2008–2009	Christopher J. Connors (R)	DiAnne Gove (R) (Note: Appointed December 7, 2009)	Brian E. Rumpf (R)
2010–2011	Christopher J. Connors (R)	DiAnne Gove (R)	Brian E. Rumpf (R)
2012–2013	Christopher J. Connors (R)	DiAnne Gove (R)	Brian E. Rumpf (R)
2014–2015	Christopher J. Connors (R)	DiAnne Gove (R)	Brian E. Rumpf (R)
2016–2017	Christopher J. Connors (R)	DiAnne Gove (R)	Brian E. Rumpf (R)
2018–2019	Christopher J. Connors (R)	DiAnne Gove (R)	Brian E. Rumpf (R)
2020–2021	Christopher J. Connors (R)	DiAnne Gove (R)	Brian E. Rumpf (R)
2022–2023	Christopher J. Connors (R)	DiAnne Gove (R)	Brian E. Rumpf (R)
2024–2025	Carmen Amato (R)	Greg Myhre (R)	Brian E. Rumpf (R)
2026–2027	Carmen Amato (R)	Greg Myhre (R)	Brian E. Rumpf (R)

== Election results, 1973–present ==
=== Senate ===
2021 New Jersey general election
Party	Candidate	Votes	%	±%
Republican	Christopher J. Connors	62,401	69.4	▲4.8
Democratic	David T. Wright	26,818	29.8	▼5.6
Unaffiliated Best Choice	Regina C. Discenza	701	0.8	N/A
Total votes		89,920	100.0	

New Jersey general election, 2017
Party	Candidate	Votes	%	±%
Republican	Christopher J. Connors	41,438	64.6	▼6.2
Democratic	Brian Corley White	22,717	35.4	▲6.2
Total votes		64,155	100.0	

New Jersey general election, 2013
Party	Candidate	Votes	%	±%
Republican	Christopher J. Connors	46,949	70.8	▲5.9
Democratic	Anthony Mazzella	19,365	29.2	▼5.9
Total votes		66,314	100.0	

2011 New Jersey general election
Party	Candidate	Votes	%
Republican	Christopher J. Connors	32,027	64.9
Democratic	Dorothy A. Ryan	17,320	35.1
Total votes		49,347	100.0

2007 New Jersey general election
Party	Candidate	Votes	%	±%
Republican	Christopher J. Connors	35,504	62.3	▼3.3
Democratic	Russell K. Corby	21,524	37.7	▲3.3
Total votes		57,028	100.0	

2003 New Jersey general election
Party	Candidate	Votes	%	±%
Republican	Leonard T. Connors, Jr.	36,539	65.6	▲6.9
Democratic	Aviva Twersky-Glasner	18,995	34.4	▼6.1
Total votes		55,534	100.0	

2001 New Jersey general election
Party	Candidate	Votes	%
Republican	Leonard T. Connors, Jr.	43,303	58.7
Democratic	Peter A. Terranova	29,885	40.5
Common Sense Independent	Mark Schreckenstein	588	0.8
Total votes		73,776	100.0

1997 New Jersey general election
Party	Candidate	Votes	%	±%
Republican	Leonard T. Connors, Jr.	45,880	60.0	▼5.2
Democratic	Bill Zimmermann, Jr.	28,508	37.3	▲2.5
Conservative	Leonard P. Marshall	2,139	2.8	N/A
Total votes		76,527	100.0	

1993 New Jersey general election
Party	Candidate	Votes	%	±%
Republican	Leonard T. Connors, Jr.	50,464	65.2	▼4.7
Democratic	Joseph Meglino	26,947	34.8	▲4.7
Total votes		77,411	100.0	

1991 New Jersey general election
Party	Candidate	Votes	%
Republican	Leonard T. Connors, Jr.	42,914	69.9
Democratic	Joseph Meglino	18,448	30.1
Total votes		61,362	100.0

1987 New Jersey general election
Party	Candidate	Votes	%	±%
Republican	Leonard T. Connors, Jr.	35,456	64.0	▲0.7
Democratic	Joan M. Tredy	19,964	36.0	▼0.7
Total votes		55,420	100.0	

1983 New Jersey general election
Party	Candidate	Votes	%	±%
Republican	Leonard T. Connors, Jr.	31,028	63.3	▼1.1
Democratic	Anthony M. Sellitto, Jr.	17,989	36.7	▲1.1
Total votes		49,017	100.0	

1981 New Jersey general election
Party	Candidate	Votes	%
Republican	Leonard T. Connors, Jr.	40,656	64.4
Democratic	Wesley K. Bell	22,441	35.6
Total votes		63,097	100.0

1977 New Jersey general election
Party	Candidate	Votes	%	±%
Democratic	John F. Russo	53,309	63.7	▲9.2
Republican	James J. Mancini	28,673	34.3	▼11.2
Libertarian	Leonard T. Flynn	1,153	1.4	N/A
Independent	Donald Knause	494	0.6	N/A
Total votes		83,629	100.0	

1973 New Jersey general election
Party	Candidate	Votes	%
Democratic	John F. Russo	38,388	54.5
Republican	Benjamin H. Mabie	32,010	45.5
Total votes		70,398	100.0

=== General Assembly ===
2021 New Jersey general election
Party	Candidate	Votes	%	±%
Republican	Brian E. Rumpf	61,980	35.1	▲0.6
Republican	DiAnne C. Gove	60,798	34.5	▲0.7
Democratic	Alexis Jackson	26,975	15.3	▼1.1
Democratic	Kristen Henninger-Holland	26,700	15.1	▼0.2
Total votes		176,453	100.0	

2019 New Jersey general election
Party	Candidate	Votes	%	±%
Republican	Brian E. Rumpf	36,537	34.5	▲2.6
Republican	DiAnne C. Gove	35,808	33.8	▲2.4
Democratic	Sarah J. Collins	17,320	16.4	▼2.3
Democratic	Wayne Lewis	16,247	15.3	▼2.7
Total votes		105,912	100.0	

New Jersey general election, 2017
Party	Candidate	Votes	%	±%
Republican	Brian E. Rumpf	40,158	31.9	▼1.5
Republican	DiAnne C. Gove	39,523	31.4	▼1.1
Democratic	Jill Dobrowansky	23,534	18.7	▲1.3
Democratic	Ryan Young	22,721	18.0	▲1.3
Total votes		125,936	100.0	

New Jersey general election, 2015
Party	Candidate	Votes	%	±%
Republican	Brian E. Rumpf	24,325	33.4	▼2.1
Republican	DiAnne C. Gove	23,676	32.5	▼1.5
Democratic	Fran Zimmer	12,638	17.4	▲1.6
Democratic	John Bingham	12,171	16.7	▲2.0
Total votes		72,810	100.0	

New Jersey general election, 2013
Party	Candidate	Votes	%	±%
Republican	Brian E. Rumpf	45,690	35.5	▲3.2
Republican	DiAnne C. Gove	43,695	34.0	▲2.8
Democratic	Christopher J. McManus	20,354	15.8	▼2.6
Democratic	Peter Ferwerda III	18,872	14.7	▼3.4
Total votes		128,611	100.0	

New Jersey general election, 2011
Party	Candidate	Votes	%
Republican	Brian E. Rumpf	30,896	32.3
Republican	DiAnne C. Gove	29,898	31.2
Democratic	Carla Kearney	17,648	18.4
Democratic	Bradley Billhimer	17,338	18.1
Total votes		95,780	100.0

New Jersey general election, 2009
Party	Candidate	Votes	%	±%
Republican	Brian E. Rumpf	54,311	34.2	▲3.9
Republican	DiAnne Gove	52,667	33.2	▲4.7
Democratic	Richard P. Visotcky	26,482	16.7	▼4.2
Democratic	Robert E. Rue	25,365	16.0	▼4.3
Total votes		158,825	100.0	

New Jersey general election, 2007
Party	Candidate	Votes	%	±%
Republican	Brian E. Rumpf	33,281	30.3	▲0.3
Republican	Daniel M. Van Pelt	31,321	28.5	▼3.6
Democratic	Michele F. Rosen	22,954	20.9	▲1.2
Democratic	William Coulter	22,295	20.3	▲2.1
Total votes		109,851	100.0	

New Jersey general election, 2005
Party	Candidate	Votes	%	±%
Republican	Christopher J. Connors	47,863	32.1	▼0.6
Republican	Brian E. Rumpf	44,761	30.0	▲1.3
Democratic	Dolores J. Coulter	29,365	19.7	▲0.2
Democratic	James Den Uyl	27,060	18.2	▼0.9
Total votes		149,049	100.0	

New Jersey general election, 2003
Party	Candidate	Votes	%	±%
Republican	Christopher J. Connors	35,580	32.7	▲2.6
Republican	Brian E. Rumpf	31,307	28.7	▼0.9
Democratic	Dolores J. Coulter	21,282	19.5	▼1.3
Democratic	Peter A. Terranova	20,763	19.1	▼0.4
Total votes		108,932	100.0	

New Jersey general election, 2001
Party	Candidate	Votes	%
Republican	Christopher J. Connors	44,004	30.1
Republican	Jeffrey W. Moran	43,178	29.6
Democratic	John F. Ryan	30,385	20.8
Democratic	Robert DiBella	28,521	19.5
Total votes		146,088	100.0

New Jersey general election, 1999
Party	Candidate	Votes	%	±%
Republican	Christopher J. Connors	31,492	30.6	▼1.3
Republican	Jeffrey W. Moran	31,182	30.3	▼1.6
Democratic	S. Karl Mohel	18,698	18.2	▲1.1
Democratic	Jack Ryan	18,640	18.1	▲1.7
Conservative	John N. Cardello	1,548	1.5	▲0.1
Conservative	James W. Eissing	1,335	1.3	▼0.1
Total votes		102,895	100.0	

New Jersey general election, 1997
Party	Candidate	Votes	%	±%
Republican	Jeffrey W. Moran	47,232	31.9	▼0.5
Republican	Christopher J. Connors	47,205	31.9	▼0.8
Democratic	Sharon Fumei	25,398	17.1	▲2.5
Democratic	Michael G. Carrig	24,298	16.4	▲1.8
Conservative	James W. Eissing	2,015	1.4	▼1.4
Conservative	Nancy L. Eissing	2,009	1.4	▼1.5
Total votes		148,157	100.0	

New Jersey general election, 1995
Party	Candidate	Votes	%	±%
Republican	Christopher J. Connors	33,394	32.7	▲0.2
Republican	Jeffrey W. Moran	33,113	32.4	▲0.2
Democratic	Miriam Wolkofsky	14,979	14.6	▼3.0
Democratic	Matt Cutano	14,959	14.6	▼3.0
Conservative	Nancy L. Eissing	2,992	2.9	N/A
Conservative	Leonard P. Marshall	2,835	2.8	N/A
Total votes		102,272	100.0	

New Jersey general election, 1993
Party	Candidate	Votes	%	±%
Republican	Christopher J. Connors	49,885	32.5	▼2.2
Republican	Jeffrey W. Moran	49,363	32.2	▼2.4
Democratic	Thomas Woolsey	27,046	17.6	▲2.1
Democratic	Robert K. Smith	26,979	17.6	▲2.4
Total votes		153,273	100.0	

1991 New Jersey general election
Party	Candidate	Votes	%
Republican	Christopher J. Connors	41,977	34.7
Republican	Jeffrey W. Moran	41,928	34.6
Democratic	Len Morano	18,821	15.5
Democratic	Edward W. Frydendahl, Jr.	18,388	15.2
Total votes		121,114	100.0

1989 New Jersey general election
Party	Candidate	Votes	%	±%
Republican	Christopher J. Connors	38,013	25.8	▼5.9
Republican	Jeffrey W. Moran	37,604	25.5	▼5.2
Democratic	Lawrence J. Williams	35,933	24.4	▲5.3
Democratic	Joseph Meglino	35,753	24.3	▲5.7
Total votes		147,303	100.0	

1987 New Jersey general election
Party	Candidate	Votes	%	±%
Republican	John T. Hendrickson, Jr.	34,525	31.7	▼0.7
Republican	Jeffrey W. Moran	33,433	30.7	▼0.7
Democratic	Judy Anderson	20,772	19.1	▼0.4
Democratic	Harry F. Schmoll, Jr.	20,288	18.6	▲2.5
Total votes		109,018	100.0	

1985 New Jersey general election
Party	Candidate	Votes	%	±%
Republican	John T. Hendrickson, Jr.	39,031	32.4	▲0.9
Republican	Jeffrey W. Moran	37,877	31.4	▲1.2
Democratic	Jorge A. Rod	23,470	19.5	▲0.4 (▼10.7)
Democratic	Warren E. Hickman	19,420	16.1	▼2.2
"Time for Change"	Paul David Hedrich	708	0.6	N/A
Total votes		120,506	100.0	

New Jersey general election, 1983
Party	Candidate	Votes	%	±%
Republican	John T. Hendrickson, Jr.	30,427	31.5	0.0
Republican	Jorge A. Rod	29,206	30.2	▲0.3
Democratic	Lawrence Scott Reynolds	18,501	19.1	▲0.2
Democratic	Joseph J. Bloom, Jr.	17,656	18.3	▼0.4
Equality for All	Donald J. Knause	875	0.9	▲0.2
Total votes		96,665	100.0	

New Jersey general election, 1981
Party	Candidate	Votes	%
Republican	John T. Hendrickson, Jr.	38,908	31.5
Republican	Jorge A. Rod	36,890	29.9
Democratic	Charles Goodman	23,303	18.9
Democratic	Anges A. Gill	23,085	18.7
"Equality For All"	Donald J. Knause	818	0.7
Libertarian	Milos Formanek	227	0.2
Libertarian	Charlene Gaudette	225	0.2
Total votes		123,456	100.0

New Jersey general election, 1979
Party	Candidate	Votes	%	±%
Democratic	John Paul Doyle	37,238	24.9	▼5.8
Republican	Hazel Gluck	37,221	24.9	▲6.3
Democratic	Daniel F. Newman	36,524	24.4	▼6.0
Republican	H. George Buckwald	34,503	23.0	▲4.6
Libertarian	Virginia A. Flynn	1,560	1.0	N/A
Libertarian	Cindy Kretchman	1,317	0.9	N/A
Down With Lawyers	Bill Gahres	872	0.6	▲0.2
True Justice	Elizabeth Ann Silverstein	250	0.2	N/A
True Justice	Marc David Silverstein	220	0.1	N/A
Total votes		149,705	100.0	

New Jersey general election, 1977
Party	Candidate	Votes	%	±%
Democratic	John Paul Doyle	49,960	30.7	▲5.3
Democratic	Daniel F. Newman	49,387	30.4	▲5.3
Republican	Stephen A. Pepe	30,173	18.6	▼5.0
Republican	John T. Hendrickson, Jr.	29,858	18.4	▼5.0
Independents for Independence	William A. Hall	1,285	0.8	N/A
Independents for Independence	John J. Conard	1,199	0.7	▲0.3
Right To Die	Bill Gahres	688	0.4	▼0.8
Total votes		162,550	100.0	

New Jersey general election, 1975
Party	Candidate	Votes	%	±%
Democratic	John Paul Doyle	35,707	25.4	▼0.4
Democratic	Daniel F. Newman	35,337	25.1	0.0
Republican	Franklin V. Fischer	33,174	23.6	▼0.6
Republican	James M. Havey	32,847	23.4	▼0.4
Very Independent Candidate	Bill Gahres	1,693	1.2	N/A
Libertarian	John J. Conard	603	0.4	N/A
Independent Non-Political	Donna Serber	437	0.3	N/A
Independent	David Lyon	291	0.2	N/A
Jeffersonian	Albert Shaia	238	0.2	N/A
Service To Mankind	Arthur John Ahrens, Jr.	188	0.1	N/A
Total votes		140,515	100.0	

New Jersey general election, 1973
Party	Candidate	Votes	%
Democratic	John Paul Doyle	35,319	25.8
Democratic	Daniel F. Newman	34,381	25.1
Republican	Joseph E. Buckelew	33,097	24.2
Republican	Franklin H. Berry, Jr.	32,579	23.8
American	John L. Deckert	758	0.6
Independent	Patrick R. McKee	590	0.4
Total votes		136,724	100.0

== Election results, 1965–1973 ==
=== Senate ===
1965 New Jersey general election
Party	Candidate	Votes	%
Republican	Nelson F. Stamler	99,327	27.4
Democratic	Mildred Barry Hughes	92,102	25.4
Republican	Peter J. McDonough	90,261	24.9
Democratic	William P. Hourihan	81,226	22.4
Total votes		362,916	100.0

1967 New Jersey general election
Party	Candidate	Votes	%
Republican	Nicholas S. LaCorte	89,036	20.0
Republican	Frank X. McDermott	88,378	19.8
Republican	Matthew J. Rinaldo	86,656	19.4
Democratic	Mildred Barry Hughes	65,999	14.8
Democratic	Lester Weiner	54,364	12.2
Democratic	James J. Kinneally, Sr.	52,347	11.7
No Unnecessary Taxes	Alexander G. Wrigley	5,508	1.2
Union Conservative	Kenneth Allardice	3,854	0.9
Total votes		446,142	100.0

Special election, November 2, 1971
Party	Candidate	Votes	%
Democratic	Jerry F. English	73,314	50.8
Republican	Van Dyke J. Pollitt	64,798	44.9
Independent Coalition	Elmer L. Sullivan	6,305	4.4
Total votes		144,417	100.0

1971 New Jersey general election
Party	Candidate	Votes	%
Republican	Matthew J. Rinaldo	93,608	20.6
Republican	Francis X. McDermott	77,536	17.1
Republican	Jerome M. Epstein	68,531	15.09
Democratic	Carmine J. Liotta	68,131	15.00
Democratic	Christopher Dietz	64,487	14.2
Democratic	John T. Connor, Jr.	63,884	14.1
Independent Coalition	Elmer L. Sullivan	6,451	1.4
Independent Coalition	Arnold Gold	6,047	1.3
Independent Coalition	Richard Avant	5,406	1.2
Total votes		454,081	100.0

Special election, November 6, 1973
Party	Candidate	Votes	%
Democratic	William J. McCloud	86,071	58.7
Republican	Elizabeth L. Cox	60,679	41.3
Total votes		146,750	100.0

=== General Assembly ===
==== District 9A ====
New Jersey general election, 1967
Party	Candidate	Votes	%
Democratic	Joseph J. Higgins	24,191	28.9
Democratic	Henry F. Gavan	22,306	26.6
Republican	Jacqueline Paterson	17,926	21.4
Republican	Valentino D. Imbriaco	16,979	20.3
Union Conservative	Elizabeth Anne Dering	1,178	1.4
Union Conservative	Jerome M. Acquisto, Jr.	1,120	1.3
Total votes		83,700	100.0

New Jersey general election, 1969
Party	Candidate	Votes	%
Democratic	Joseph J. Higgins	31,654	31.1
Democratic	Henry F. Gavan	31,004	30.4
Republican	Joseph P. Locascio	20,327	19.9
Republican	Alan Coen	17,291	17.0
National Conservative	William J. O’Grady	866	0.8
National Conservative	James J. Molloy	771	0.8
Total votes		101,913	100.0

New Jersey general election, 1971
Party	Candidate	Votes	%
Democratic	Joseph J. Higgins	23,497	28.4
Democratic	Alexander J. Menza	22,457	27.2
Republican	Leonard Genova	17,177	20.8
Republican	Thomas T. Buckley	15,019	18.2
Independent Coalition	Wilbert Blackshear	1,909	2.3
Independent Coalition	Richard Mathisen	1,783	2.2
No New Taxes	Philip R. Nicolaus	753	0.9
Total votes		82,595	100.0

==== District 9B ====
New Jersey general election, 1967
Party	Candidate	Votes	%
Republican	Herbert J. Heilmann	31,542	29.6
Republican	Herbert H. Kiehn	31,490	29.5
Democratic	Albert S. Parsonnet	21,410	20.1
Democratic	Herbert Blaustein	20,618	19.3
Union Conservative	Alexander E. Maleski	1,605	1.5
Total votes		106,665	100.0

New Jersey general election, 1969
Party	Candidate	Votes	%
Republican	Herbert J. Heilmann	40,376	29.9
Republican	Hugo M. Pfaltz, Jr.	40,093	29.7
Democratic	Michael J. Mehr	27,106	20.1
Democratic	Peter G. Humanik	26,636	19.7
National Conservative	Forster G. Ruhl	918	0.7
Total votes		135,129	100.0

Special election, November 2, 1971
Party	Candidate	Votes	%
Republican	Elizabeth L. Cox	33,825	59.1
Democratic	Harry W. Foskey	20,712	36.2
Independent Coalition	David K. McGuire	2,649	4.6
Total votes		57,186	100.0

New Jersey general election, 1971
Party	Candidate	Votes	%
Republican	C. Louis Bassano	28,419	25.0
Republican	Herbert H. Kiehn	28,115	24.8
Democratic	Henry F. Gavan	25,847	22.8
Democratic	Donald Lan	25,798	22.7
Independent Coalition	David K. McGuire	3,191	2.8
Independent Coalition	Melvin Charles	2,089	1.8
Total votes		113,459	100.0

==== District 9C ====
New Jersey general election, 1967
Party	Candidate	Votes	%
Republican	Peter J. McDonough	39,390	38.5
Republican	Hugo M. Pfaltz	36,738	35.9
Democratic	George Perselay	13,750	13.4
Democratic	Joseph A. Gannon	12,411	12.1
Total votes		102,289	100.0

New Jersey general election, 1969
Party	Candidate	Votes	%
Republican	Peter J. McDonough	36,116	30.2
Republican	Herbert H. Kiehn	34,165	28.6
Democratic	Thomas H. Hannen	24,684	20.6
Democratic	John F. Allaire, Jr.	24,647	20.6
Total votes		119,612	100.0

New Jersey general election, 1971
Party	Candidate	Votes	%
Republican	Peter J. McDonough	32,463	33.9
Republican	Arthur A. Manner	28,913	30.2
Democratic	Eugene Campbell	17,559	18.3
Democratic	A. Charles Walano	16,893	17.6
Total votes		95,828	100.0

==== District 9 at-large ====
New Jersey general election, 1967
Party	Candidate	Votes	%
Republican	Charles J. Irwin	84,750	58.3
Democratic	Everett C. Lattimore	57,427	39.5
No Unnecessary Taxes	Eugene Daddio	3,188	2.2
Total votes		145,365	100.0

New Jersey general election, 1969
Party	Candidate	Votes	%
Republican	Charles J. Irwin	88,195	49.7
Democratic	John T. Connor, Jr.	87,061	49.0
National Conservative	Harold J. Kauffmann	2,311	1.3
Total votes		177,567	100.0
