= Hazel Gluck =

American politician and lobbyist

Hazel Frank Gluck
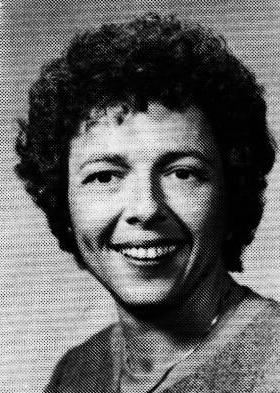

New Jersey Commissioner of Transportation
- In office 1986–1989
- Preceded by: Roger Bodman
- Succeeded by: Thomas Downs

New Jersey Commissioner of Insurance
- In office 1985–1986
- Preceded by: Kenneth Merin
- Succeeded by: Kenneth Merin

Executive Director, New Jersey Lottery Commission
- In office 1982–1985
- Preceded by: Gloria Decker

Member of the New Jersey General Assembly from the 9th district
- In office January 12, 1980 – January 10, 1982 Serving with John Paul Doyle
- Preceded by: Daniel F. Newman
- Succeeded by: John T. Hendrickson Jr. Jorge A. Rod

Personal details
- Born: September 6, 1934 (age 92) New York, New York
- Spouse(s): Joseph Gluck, M.D. (divorced)
- Children: Deborah Gluck, Michael Gluck
- Education: University of Michigan (1956)

Hazel Sara Frank Gluck (born September 6, 1934) is an American Republican Party politician and lobbyist who served in the New Jersey General Assembly and held several posts in the cabinet of Governor Thomas Kean. She was a top advisor to NJ Governor Christine Todd Whitman as well as a founding member of one of NJ's largest lobbying firms.

== Early life ==
Gluck was born in New York City, the only daughter of Jewish immigrants from the United Kingdom. She was raised in Brooklyn and Westchester, and graduated from A.B. Davis High School in Mount Vernon, New York. She is a 1956 graduate of the University of Michigan in Ann Arbor. She married Joseph Gluck, a physician, and had two children: Deborah (born 1957) and Michael (born 1959).

== Political career ==
A resident of Lakewood Township, New Jersey, Gluck became active in the League of Women Voters and served as President of the chapter in Lakewood. She became active in Ocean County Republican politics as a protege of Joseph Buckalew, who had served as Lakewood Mayor, Ocean County Freeholder and Republican County Chairman. She was later appointed Director of the Ocean County Department of Consumer Affairs.

In 1976, Gluck was elected to the Ocean County Board of Freeholders. She defeated a Democratic incumbent who was elected in the 1973 Watergate landslide. Her election gave the Republicans control of the Freeholder Board, which they have held since then.

Gluck gave up her Freeholder seat to run for the New Jersey General Assembly in 1979. She defeated three-term Democratic Assemblyman Daniel F. Newman by 697 votes, 37,221-36,524.

In 1981, Gluck gave up her Assembly seat and challenged two-term Democratic State Senator John F. Russo. Russo won easily, defeating Gluck by 11,233 votes, 38,166 (59%) to 26,933 (41%). Gluck later called her Senate bid a "stupid" mistake, saying that Russo had done a good job and there was no reason to throw him out.

For a brief time in late 1981 and early 1982, Gluck served as the Ocean County Administrator, as the replacement for Frank B. Holman, who had become executive director of the New Jersey Republican State Committee.

== Kean administration ==
After taking office in January 1982, Governor Tom Kean appointed Gluck to serve as executive director of the New Jersey Lottery Commission. She was appointed Commissioner of Insurance in 1985, and Commissioner of Transportation in 1987. She also served as a Commissioner of the Port Authority of New York and New Jersey from 1987 to 1993.

== Gubernatorial candidate ==
Toward the end of Kean's second term, Gluck began to explore a possible bid for the Republican nomination for Governor of New Jersey in 1989. She was considered a potential gubernatorial candidate in 1993, but instead backed Christine Todd Whitman, who won. She was a top advisor to Whitman, both in her campaign and in her administration.

== Lobbyist ==
Gluck resigned as state Transportation Commissioner on July 7, 1989, to form a lobbying firm, Public Policy Advisors, Inc., with former state Department of Environmental Protection Assistant Commissioner Sidney Ytkin. She later formed GluckShaw in a partnership with Judy Shaw. Shaw resigned from the firm in 1994 to become Governor Whitman's Chief of Staff. In 2003, the firm merged with Martin-Bontempo-Matacera-Bartlett, Inc., to become MBI-GluckShaw, which became one of the state's largest lobbying firms. She is now retired.

== Gay rights activist ==
Gluck was married to Joseph Gluck, M.D. for 25 years before divorcing in 1981. In 2013, at age 78, she announced that she was gay. In 2013, she attempted to lobby New Jersey Governor Chris Christie to support marriage equality.
