= Jorge A. Rod =

American politician

Member of the New Jersey General Assembly from the 9th district
- In office January 12, 1982 – January 14, 1986
- Preceded by: John Paul Doyle; Hazel Gluck
- Succeeded by: Jeffrey Moran

Personal details
- Born: 1947 (age 78–79) Colombia
- Party: Democratic (since 1985)
- Other political affiliations: Republican (until 1985)

Jorge A. Rod (born 1947) is an American politician who represented the 9th Legislative District in the New Jersey General Assembly from 1982 to 1986.

Born in Colombia, Rod attended Hackensack High School. He served in the United States Army for three years, from 1965 to 1968, attaining the rank of sergeant. He then attended Ocean County College and Trenton State College (since renamed as The College of New Jersey).

A Lacey Township, New Jersey resident, Rod served on the Township Council and was selected as mayor in 1981.

During most of his tenure in the General Assembly, he was a Republican. However, on August 27, 1985, he switched his party registration to Democratic. In the June Republican Primary, he was defeated by Jeffrey Moran and his previous running mate, John T. Hendrickson Jr.. He joined the Democratic ticket for the seat that November but lost to both Republicans.
