= Joseph J. Higgins =

American politician

Member of the New Jersey General Assembly from District 9A
- In office January 9, 1968 – January 8, 1974
- Preceded by: District created
- Succeeded by: District abolished

Member of the New Jersey General Assembly from the Union district
- In office January 11, 1966 – January 9, 1968
- Preceded by: Multi-member district
- Succeeded by: District abolished

Personal details
- Born: October 12, 1929; Elizabeth, New Jersey
- Died: July 20, 2007 (aged 77); Fort Lauderdale, Florida
- Political party: Democratic

Joseph J. Higgins (October 12, 1929 – July 20, 2007) was an American politician who served in the New Jersey General Assembly from 1966 to 1974.

Born and raised in Elizabeth, Higgins played prep baseball at St. Patrick's High School. He graduated from Seton Hall University and earned a law degree from Georgetown University Law Center after completing military service in the United States Navy during the Korean War. He died on July 20, 2007, in Fort Lauderdale, Florida at age 77.
