= Leonard T. Connors =

American politician (1929–2016)

Mayor of Surf City
- In office January 1, 1966 – December 31, 2015
- Succeeded by: Francis R. Hodgson Sr.

Member of the New Jersey Senate from the 9th district
- In office January 12, 1982 – January 8, 2008
- Preceded by: John F. Russo
- Succeeded by: Christopher J. Connors

Personal details
- Born: April 11, 1929 Jersey City, New Jersey, U.S.
- Died: December 4, 2016 (aged 87) Little Egg Harbor Township, New Jersey, U.S.
- Party: Republican

Leonard T. Connors Jr. (April 11, 1929 – December 4, 2016) was an American Republican Party politician who represented the 9th Legislative District in the New Jersey Senate from 1982 to 2008. Previously, he served on the Ocean County Board of Chosen Freeholders from 1977 to 1982, and was the Mayor of Surf City, New Jersey from 1966 to 2015.

Born in Jersey City and raised in Wood-Ridge, New Jersey, Connors graduated from Wood-Ridge High School before serving for two years in the United States Air Force.

Connors died on December 4, 2016, at the age of 87 at his home in Seacrest nursing home.

== Career ==
In the 209th session, Connors sponsored Senate Bill No. 692, prohibiting possession or consumption of alcoholic beverages on private property by persons under legal drinking age. This bill amended P.L. 1979, c.264 (C.2C:33-15), which had banned underage consumption and possession only in motor vehicles and other public areas. In the 2006-08 session, Connors served on the Senate's State Government Committee and the Community & Urban Affairs Committee.

He announced in January 2007 that he would be retiring and would not be a candidate in 2007. Connors' son, Christopher J. Connors served in the New Jersey General Assembly where he also represents the 9th District, and succeeded him in the Senate in 2008.

== See also ==
- List of longest-serving United States mayors
