= Daniel F. Newman =

American politician

Daniel Francis Newman, Sr. (July 25, 1935 – March 13, 2009) was an American Democratic Party politician who served in the New Jersey General Assembly and as Mayor of Brick Township, New Jersey.

Newman was born in Bayonne, New Jersey, the son of John and Bertha (McGee) Newman, and moved to Brick in 1959. He owned two gas stations, a tire company, and a plumbing business. He served on the Board of Education of the Brick Public Schools, the Brick Planning Board, and the Brick Zoning Board of Adjustment.

In 1973, Newman was elected to the State Assembly. He was re-elected in 1975 and 1977. He was an unsuccessful candidate for re-election to a fourth term in 1979, losing to Republican Hazel Gluck by 697 votes, 37,221-36,524.

Newman served as Chairman of the Assembly Education Committee.

He was elected Mayor of Brick in 1981 and re-elected in 1985.

He lost a bid for a third term in 1989.
