= Henrikson =

Henrikson is a surname. Notable people with the surname include:

- Alf Henrikson (1905–1995), Swedish writer, poet, and translator
- Anders Henrikson (1896–1965), Swedish actor and film director
- C. Robert Henrikson (born 1947), American corporate executive
- Elna Henrikson, Swedish figure skater
