= John T. Hendrickson Jr. =

American politician

Member of the New Jersey General Assembly from the 9th Legislative District
- In office January 12, 1982 – September 1, 1989 Serving with Jorge A. Rod and Jeffrey Moran
- Preceded by: John Paul Doyle; Hazel Gluck
- Succeeded by: Christopher J. Connors

Personal details
- Born: January 30, 1923 Elizabeth, New Jersey, US
- Died: September 25, 1999 (aged 76)
- Party: Republican

John T. Hendrickson Jr. (January 30, 1923 – September 25, 1999) was an American politician who served in the New Jersey General Assembly from the 9th Legislative District from 1982 to 1989. He served as Mayor of Eagleswood Township, New Jersey.

Born in Elizabeth, New Jersey. Hendrickson graduated from Linden High School in nearby Linden.

One of Hendrickson's legislative priorities was sustaining commercial and recreational clam harvesting activities in New Jersey.

Hendrickson served as Mayor of Eagleswood Township for 12 years, part of his continuous service on the Township Committee from 1961 to 1984. He also served the community in a number of other ways, including membership on the Planning Board and the Volunteer Fire Company. He was a real estate appraiser, and past president of the Atlantic-Cape May Chapter of the American Society of Appraisers.

Hendrickson was in the United States Army from 1943 to 1946, serving with an artillery unit in Europe in World War II. He was a former president of the Board of Education of the Ocean County Vocational Technical School. He also served as the Ocean County representative on the Pinelands Commission. Hendrickson was a charter board member of Southern Ocean County Hospital in Manahawkin.

Hendrickson and his wife Adeline are buried at West Creek Cemetery in Eagleswood Township.
