= Carmen Amato =

American politician from New Jersey

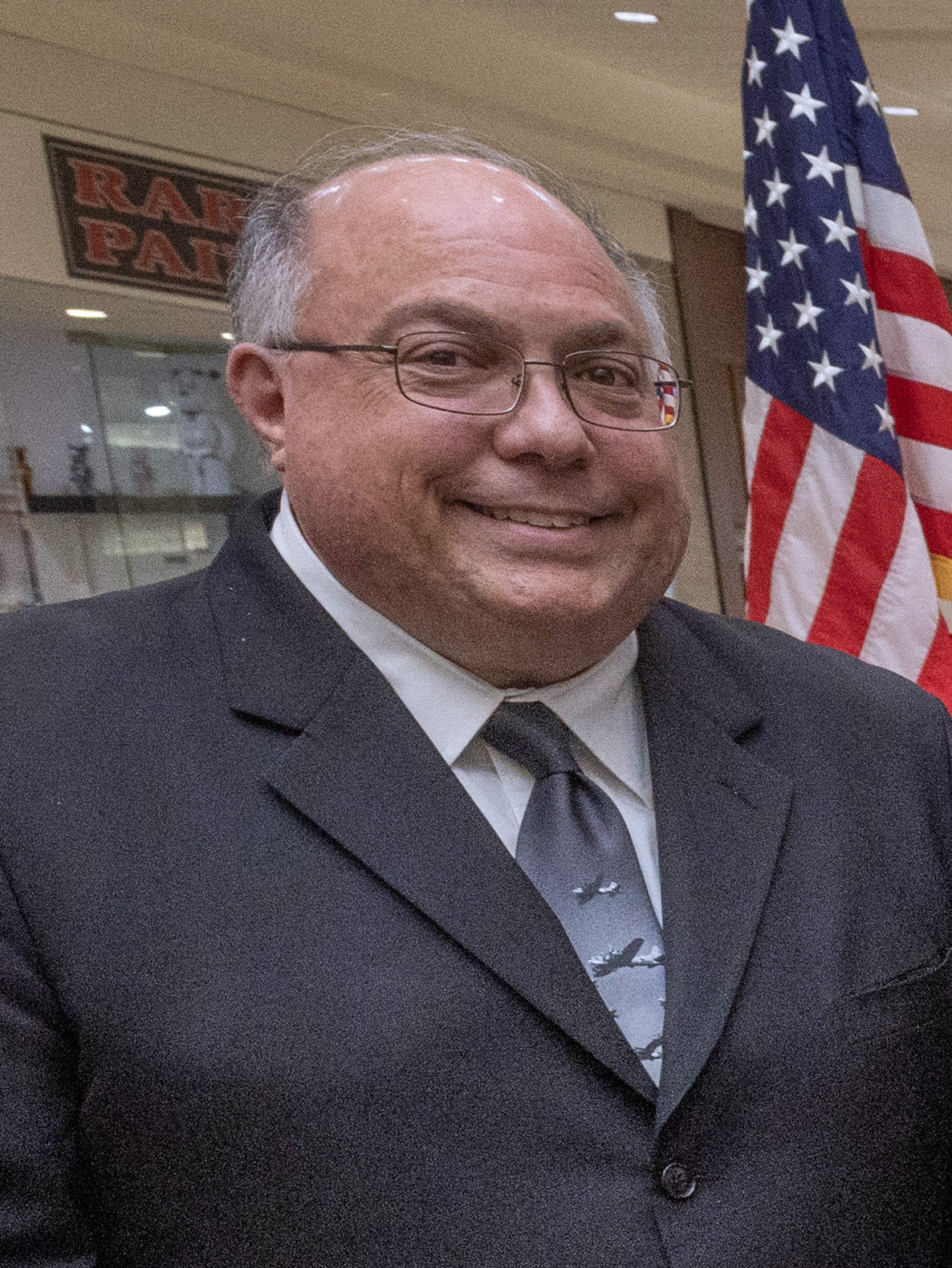
- Amato in 2025

Member of the New Jersey Senate from the 9th district
- Incumbent
- Assumed office January 9, 2024
- Preceded by: Christopher Connors

Personal details
- Party: Republican
- Education: Ocean County College
- Website: Legislative webpage

Carmen F. Amato Jr. is an American Republican Party politician serving as a member of the New Jersey Senate for the 9th legislative district, having taken office on January 9, 2024.

== Biography ==
A resident of the Bayville section of Berkeley Township, New Jersey, Amato attended Central Regional High School and Ocean County College.

== Elective office ==
Amato served as a member on the local board of education of the Berkeley Township School District from 1993 to 2000 and of the Central Regional School District from 2000 to 2005. He represented Ward 2 on the Berkeley Township Council from 2006 to 2011 and served as the township's mayor from 2012 to 2023.

=== New Jersey Senate ===
With Christopher Connors not running for re-election after 16 years in the Senate in a district that he and his father Leonard T. Connors had represented in the Senate for more than four decades, Amato stepped in and sought the Republican nomination. Amato defeated Democrat Gabriel Franco in the 2023 New Jersey Senate election. Amato was one of 10 members elected for the first time in 2023 to serve in the Senate, one quarter of all seats.

=== Committees ===
Committee assignments for the 2024-2025 session are:

- Budget and Appropriations
- Community and Urban Affairs
- Higher Education

=== District 9 ===
Each of the 40 districts in the New Jersey Legislature has one representative in the New Jersey Senate and two members in the New Jersey General Assembly. The representatives from the 9th District for the 2024—2025 Legislative Session are:

- Senator Carmen Amato (R)
- Assemblyman Greg Myhre (R)
- Assemblyman Brian E. Rumpf (R)

== Electoral history ==
=== Senate ===
9th Legislative District General Election, 2023
Party	Candidate	Votes	%
Republican	Carmen F. Amato Jr.	38,124	67.9
Democratic	Gabriel Franco	17,986	32.1
Total votes		56,110	100.0
Republican hold			
