= Jeffrey Moran =

American politician

Member of the New Jersey General Assembly from the 9th Legislative District
- In office January 14, 1986 – June 17, 2003 Serving with John T. Hendrickson Jr. and Christopher J. Connors
- Preceded by: Jorge A. Rod
- Succeeded by: Brian E. Rumpf

Personal details
- Born: December 23, 1946 (age 79) Winfield Township, New Jersey
- Party: Republican

Jeffrey W. Moran (born December 23, 1946, Winfield Township, New Jersey) is an American Republican politician, who served in the New Jersey General Assembly from 1986 to 2003, where he represented the 9th Legislative District.

== Biography ==
Moran born and raised in Winfield Township, New Jersey and graduated from Rahway High School in 1970. He received a B.A. from Alma White College in English, and was awarded an M.A. from Kean College in Administration.

From 1966 to 1967, served as a Quartermaster in the United States Coast Guard. From 1970 to 1972, he was a member of the Beachwood Borough Council and served on the borough's Planning Board. He served on the Beachwood Sewerage Authority since 1973 and on the Ocean County Utilities Authority from 1980 to 1985. He served as Assistant Superintendent in the Toms River Regional Schools from 1999 to 2001. He served in the Assembly on the Regulated Professions & Independent Authorities Committee.

Brian E. Rumpf was selected by a special Republican convention in June 2003 to fill the vacancy in the Assembly created upon Moran's resignation to accept appointment on June 17, 2003, by Governor of New Jersey Jim McGreevey to serve as Ocean County Surrogate.
