= Brian E. Rumpf =

Member of the New Jersey General Assembly

Brian Rumpf
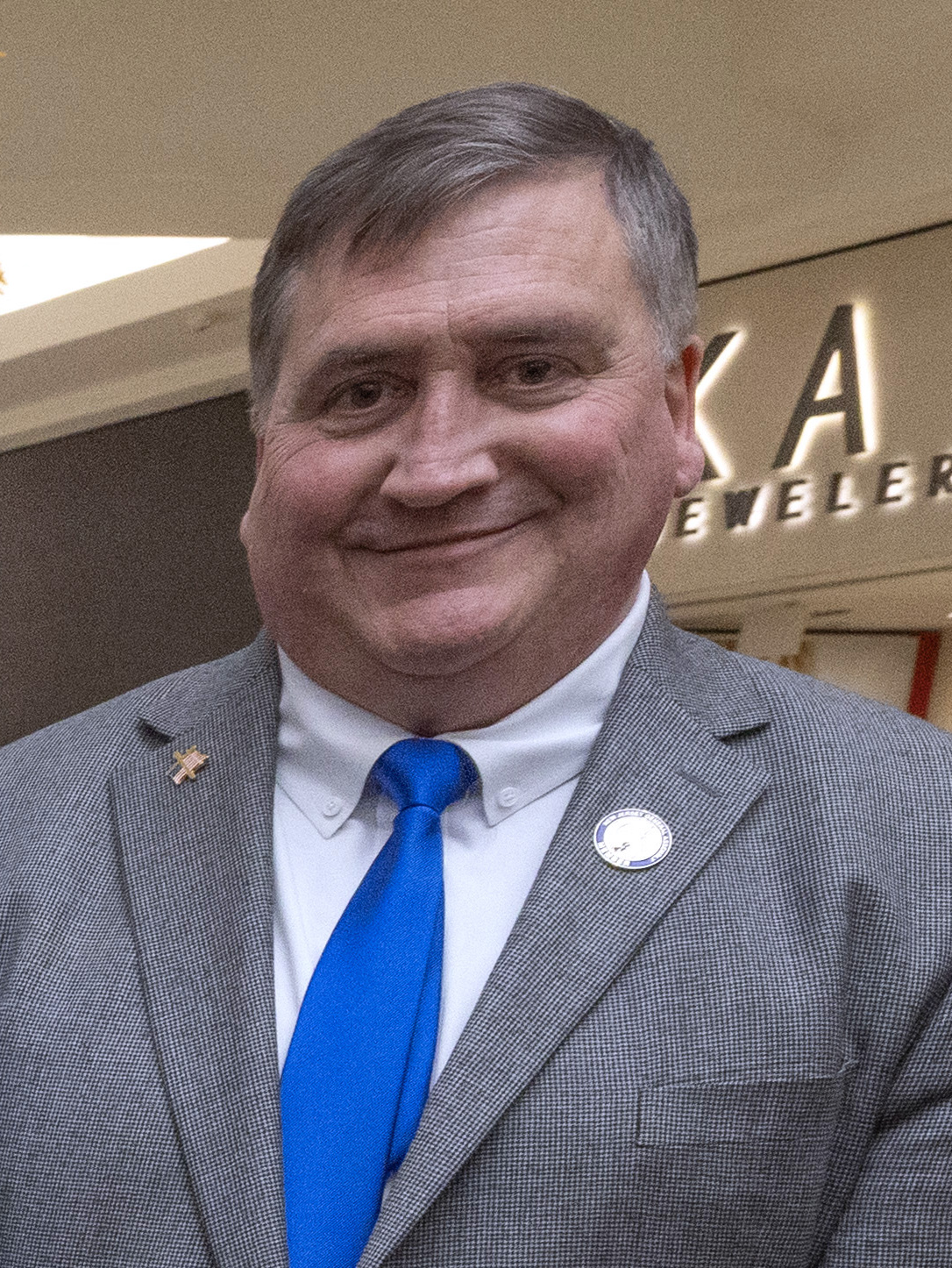

Member of the New Jersey General Assembly from the 9th district
- Incumbent
- Assumed office June 23, 2003 Serving with Christopher J. Connors (2003-2008); Daniel Van Pelt (2008-2009); DiAnne Gove (2009-2024); Greg Myhre (2024-present)
- Preceded by: Jeffrey Moran

Mayor of Little Egg Harbor, New Jersey
- In office January 1, 2000 – December 31, 2003
- Preceded by: John Adair
- Succeeded by: Raymond Gormley

Personal details
- Born: May 11, 1964 (age 62) Somerville, New Jersey
- Party: Republican
- Spouse: Debra Rumpf
- Education: B.A. The Catholic University of America (politics); J.D. Washington and Lee University School of Law
- Occupation: Attorney
- Website: Legislative Website

Brian E. Rumpf (born May 11, 1964) is an American Republican politician, who has represented the 9th Legislative District in the New Jersey General Assembly since taking office on June 23, 2003. He has been the Minority Policy Co-Chair in the General Assembly since 2014.

== Early life ==
He was born in Somerville, New Jersey, on May 11, 1964, and graduated from St. Joseph High School. Rumpf received a B.A. in Politics from The Catholic University of America in 1986 and was awarded a Juris Doctor degree from the Washington and Lee University School of Law in 1989. Rumpf served on the Little Egg Harbor Township Committee from 1997 to 2005, serving as its Mayor from 2000 - 2003. He serves as a member of the Little Egg Harbor Township Planning Board.

== New Jersey Assembly ==
Rumpf was selected by a special Republican convention in June 2003 to fill a vacancy in the Assembly created upon the resignation of Assemblyman Jeffrey Moran to accept appointment as Ocean County Surrogate.

=== Committees ===
Committee assignments for the current session are:

- Budget
- Health

=== District 9 ===
Each of the 40 districts in the New Jersey Legislature has one representative in the New Jersey Senate and two members in the New Jersey General Assembly. The representatives from the 9th District for the 2024—2025 Legislative Session are:

- Senator Carmen Amato (R)
- Assemblyman Greg Myhre (R)
- Assemblyman Brian E. Rumpf (R)

== Personal life ==
He currently resides in Little Egg Harbor Township where he and his wife Debra are partners at the law firm Rumpf, Rumpf and Reid. They have two children.

He also works full-time for the Ocean County Health Department as director of personnel and program development, a $139,000 position supplementing his $49,000 salary as Assemblyman. It is unclear how much additional income Rumpf earns from his law firm.

== Electoral history ==
=== Assembly ===
9th Legislative District General Election, 2023
Party	Candidate	Votes	%
Republican	Brian E. Rumpf (incumbent)	37,559	34.0
Republican	Greg Myhre	36,342	32.9
Democratic	Sarah Collins	18,374	16.6
Democratic	Joseph Atura	17,205	15.6
Green	Barry Bendar	979	0.8
Total votes		110,459	100.0
Republican hold			
Republican hold			

9th Legislative District General Election, 2021
Party	Candidate	Votes	%
Republican	Brian E. Rumpf (incumbent)	61,980	35.13%
Republican	DiAnne C. Gove (incumbent)	60,798	34.46%
Democratic	Alexis Jackson	26,975	15.29%
Democratic	Kristen Henninger-Holland	26,700	15.13%
Total votes		176,453	100.0
Republican hold			

9th Legislative District General Election, 2019
Party	Candidate	Votes	%
Republican	Brian Rumpf (incumbent)	35,190	34.8%
Republican	DiAnne Gove (incumbent)	34,462	34.08%
Democratic	Sarah Collins	16,246	16.07%
Democratic	Wayne Lewis	15,211	15.04%
Total votes		101,109	100%
Republican hold			

New Jersey general election, 2017
Party	Candidate	Votes	%	±%
Republican	Brian E. Rumpf	40,158	31.9	▼1.5
Republican	DiAnne C. Gove	39,523	31.4	▼1.1
Democratic	Jill Dobrowansky	23,534	18.7	▲1.3
Democratic	Ryan Young	22,721	18.0	▲1.3
Total votes		'125,936'	'100.0'	

New Jersey general election, 2015
Party	Candidate	Votes	%	±%
Republican	Brian E. Rumpf	24,325	33.4	▼2.1
Republican	DiAnne C. Gove	23,676	32.5	▼1.5
Democratic	Fran Zimmer	12,638	17.4	▲1.6
Democratic	John Bingham	12,171	16.7	▲2.0
Total votes		'72,810'	'100.0'	

New Jersey general election, 2013
Party	Candidate	Votes	%	±%
Republican	Brian E. Rumpf	45,690	35.5	▲3.2
Republican	DiAnne C. Gove	43,695	34.0	▲2.8
Democratic	Christopher J. McManus	20,354	15.8	▼2.6
Democratic	Peter Ferwerda III	18,872	14.7	▼3.4
Total votes		'128,611'	'100.0'	

New Jersey general election, 2011
Party	Candidate	Votes	%
Republican	Brian E. Rumpf	30,896	32.3
Republican	DiAnne C. Gove	29,898	31.2
Democratic	Carla Kearney	17,648	18.4
Democratic	Bradley Billhimer	17,338	18.1
Total votes		95,780	100.0

New Jersey general election, 2009
Party	Candidate	Votes	%	±%
Republican	Brian E. Rumpf	54,311	34.2	▲3.9
Republican	DiAnne Gove	52,667	33.2	▲4.7
Democratic	Richard P. Visotcky	26,482	16.7	▼4.2
Democratic	Robert E. Rue	25,365	16.0	▼4.3
Total votes		'158,825'	'100.0'	

New Jersey general election, 2007
Party	Candidate	Votes	%	±%
Republican	Brian E. Rumpf	33,281	30.3	▲0.3
Republican	Daniel M. Van Pelt	31,321	28.5	▼3.6
Democratic	Michele F. Rosen	22,954	20.9	▲1.2
Democratic	William Coulter	22,295	20.3	▲2.1
Total votes		'109,851'	'100.0'	

New Jersey general election, 2005
Party	Candidate	Votes	%	±%
Republican	Christopher J. Connors	47,863	32.1	▼0.6
Republican	Brian E. Rumpf	44,761	30.0	▲1.3
Democratic	Dolores J. Coulter	29,365	19.7	▲0.2
Democratic	James Den Uyl	27,060	18.2	▼0.9
Total votes		'149,049'	'100.0'	

New Jersey general election, 2003
Party	Candidate	Votes	%	±%
Republican	Christopher J. Connors	35,580	32.7	▲2.6
Republican	Brian E. Rumpf	31,307	28.7	▼0.9
Democratic	Dolores J. Coulter	21,282	19.5	▼1.3
Democratic	Peter A. Terranova	20,763	19.1	▼0.4
Total votes		'108,932'	'100.0'	

New Jersey General Assembly
Preceded by Jeffrey Moran	Member of the New Jersey General Assembly for the 9th District; June 23, 2003 – present With: Christopher J. Connors, Daniel Van Pelt, DiAnne Gove	Succeeded by Incumbent
