= 1987 New Jersey Senate election =

1987 New Jersey Senate elections
- November 3, 1987

All 40 seats in the New Jersey State Senate 21 seats needed for a majority
- Turnout: 47% (▼1pp)
	Majority party	Minority party
Leader	John F. Russo	S. Thomas Gagliano (stepped down)
Party	Democratic	Republican
Leader since	January 14, 1986	January 8, 1985
Leader's seat	10th (Toms River)	12th (Holmdel)
Last election	23	17
Seats before	23	17
Seats won	24	16
Seat change	▲1	▼1
- Results by district Democratic hold Democratic gain Republican hold
Senate President before election
John F. Russo
Democratic
Elected Senate President
John F. Russo
Democratic

The 1987 New Jersey Senate election was held on November 3.

The election took place mid-way through the second term of Governor Thomas Kean. The elections were marked by extreme stability; only one seat, that of Peter P. Garibaldi in the 18th district, did not return its incumbent Senator. Multiple Senators were re-elected unopposed.

Contents
Incumbents not running • Summary of results
By District: 1 • 2 • 3 • 4 • 5 • 6 • 7 • 8 • 9 • 10 • 11 • 12 • 13 • 14 • 15 • 16 • 17 • 18 • 19 • 20 • 21 • 22 • 23 • 24 • 25 • 26 • 27 • 28 • 29 • 30 • 31 • 32 • 33 • 34 • 35 • 36 • 37 • 38 • 39 • 40

== Incumbents not running for re-election ==
Every incumbent Senator ran for re-election.

== Summary of results by State Senate district ==
District	Incumbent	Party	Elected Senator	Party
1st Legislative District	James R. Hurley	Rep	James R. Hurley	Rep
2nd Legislative District	William Gormley	Rep	William Gormley	Rep
3rd Legislative District	Raymond Zane	Dem	Raymond Zane	Dem
4th Legislative District	Daniel Dalton	Dem	Daniel Dalton	Dem
5th Legislative District	Walter Rand	Dem	Walter Rand	Dem
6th Legislative District	Lee Laskin	Rep	Lee Laskin	Rep
7th Legislative District	Catherine A. Costa	Dem	Catherine A. Costa	Dem
8th Legislative District	C. William Haines (Note: Haines won a 1984 special election to complete the term of Jim Saxton, who resigned to take a seat in the U.S. House of Representatives.)	Rep	C. William Haines	Rep
9th Legislative District	Leonard T. Connors	Rep	Leonard T. Connors	Rep
10th Legislative District	John F. Russo	Dem	John F. Russo	Dem
11th Legislative District	Frank Pallone	Dem	Frank Pallone	Dem
12th Legislative District	S. Thomas Gagliano	Rep	S. Thomas Gagliano	Rep
13th Legislative District	Richard Van Wagner	Dem	Richard Van Wagner	Dem
14th Legislative District	Francis J. McManimon	Dem	Francis J. McManimon	Dem
15th Legislative District	Gerald R. Stockman	Dem	Gerald R. Stockman	Dem
16th Legislative District	John H. Ewing	Rep	John H. Ewing	Rep
17th Legislative District	John A. Lynch Jr.	Dem	John A. Lynch Jr.	Dem
18th Legislative District	Peter P. Garibaldi	Rep	Thomas H. Paterniti	Dem
19th Legislative District	Laurence Weiss	Dem	Laurence Weiss	Dem
20th Legislative District	Raymond Lesniak	Dem	Raymond Lesniak	Dem
21st Legislative District	C. Louis Bassano	Rep	C. Louis Bassano	Rep
22nd Legislative District	Donald DiFrancesco	Rep	Donald DiFrancesco	Rep
23rd Legislative District	Dick Zimmer (Note: Zimmer won a March special election to complete the unexpired term of Senator Walter E. Foran, who died in December 1986.)	Rep	Dick Zimmer	Rep
24th Legislative District	Wayne Dumont	Rep	Wayne Dumont	Rep
25th Legislative District	John H. Dorsey	Rep	John H. Dorsey	Rep
26th Legislative District	Leanna Brown	Rep	Leanna Brown	Rep
27th Legislative District	Richard Codey	Dem	Richard Codey	Dem
28th Legislative District	Ronald Rice (Note: Rice won a special November 1986 election to complete the unexpired term of John P. Caufield, who died in August 1986.)	Dem	Ronald Rice	Dem
29th Legislative District	Wynona Lipman	Dem	Wynona Lipman	Dem
30th Legislative District	Carmen Orechio	Dem	Carmen Orechio	Dem
31st Legislative District	Edward T. O'Connor Jr.	Dem	Edward T. O'Connor Jr.	Dem
32nd Legislative District	Thomas F. Cowan	Dem	Thomas F. Cowan	Dem
33rd Legislative District	Christopher Jackman	Dem	Christopher Jackman	Dem
34th Legislative District	Joseph Bubba	Rep	Joseph Bubba	Rep
35th Legislative District	Frank X. Graves Jr.	Dem	Frank X. Graves Jr.	Dem
36th Legislative District	Gabriel M. Ambrosio (Note: Ambrosio won a March special election to complete the unexpired term of Joseph Hirkala, who died in January.)	Dem	Gabriel M. Ambrosio	Dem
37th Legislative District	Matthew Feldman	Dem	Matthew Feldman	Dem
38th Legislative District	Paul Contillo	Dem	Paul Contillo	Dem
39th Legislative District	Gerald Cardinale	Rep	Gerald Cardinale	Rep
40th Legislative District	Henry McNamara (Note: McNamara won a November 1985 special election to complete the unexpired term of Senator Garrett Hagedorn, who died in August 1985.)	Rep	Henry McNamara	Rep

=== Close races ===
Seats where the margin of victory was under 10%:

1. District 13, 2.0%
2. District 36, 2.4%
3. District 38, 5.2%
4. District 25, 5.4%
5. District 30, 5.9%
6. District 1, 6.8%
7. District 6, 6.4%
8. District 21, 7.6%
9. District 34, 7.8%

== District 1 ==
New Jersey general election, 1987
Party	Candidate	Votes	%	±%
Republican	James R. Hurley (incumbent)	29,272	53.4%	▼6.4
Democratic	Donald H. Rainear	25,512	46.6%	▲6.4
Total votes		54,784	100.00%	

== District 2 ==
1987 general election
Party	Candidate	Votes	%	±%
Republican	William Gormley (incumbent)	30,665	73.4%	▲16.6
Democratic	William J. Polistina	11,119	26.6%	▼14.4
Total votes		41,784	100.00%	

== District 3 ==
New Jersey general election, 1987
Party	Candidate	Votes	%	±%
Democratic	Raymond Zane (incumbent)	32,720	63.0%	0.0
Republican	John A. Ward	19,224	37.0%	0.0
Total votes		51,944	100.00%	

== District 4 ==
New Jersey general election, 1987
Party	Candidate	Votes	%	±%
Democratic	Daniel Dalton (incumbent)	24,574	58.9%	▼5.0
Republican	William F. Thomson	17,148	41.1%	▲5.0
Total votes		41,722	100.00%	

== District 5 ==
New Jersey general election, 1987
Party	Candidate	Votes	%	±%
Democratic	Walter Rand (incumbent)	24,784	68.3%	▲2.3
Republican	Mary Jo Tate	11,477	31.7%	▼2.3
Total votes		36,261	100.00%	

== District 6 ==
New Jersey general election, 1987
Party	Candidate	Votes	%	±%
Republican	Lee B. Laskin (incumbent)	31,162	53.2%	▼10.1
Democratic	Maria Barnaby Greenwald	27,444	46.8%	▲10.1
Total votes		58,606	100.00%	

== District 7 ==
New Jersey general election, 1987
Party	Candidate	Votes	%	±%
Democratic	Catherine A. Costa (incumbent)	27,244	63.4%	▲0.3
Republican	James A. Bristow	15,745	36.6%	▼0.3
Total votes		42,989	100.00%	

== District 8 ==
New Jersey general election, 1987
Party	Candidate	Votes	%	±%
Republican	C. William Haines (incumbent)	28,731	66.5%	▼5.2
Democratic	James B. Smith	14,444	33.5%	▲5.2
Total votes		43,175	100.00%	

== District 9 ==
New Jersey general election, 1987
Party	Candidate	Votes	%	±%
Republican	Leonard T. Connors (incumbent)	35,456	64.0%	▲0.7
Democratic	Joan M. Tredy	19,964	36.0%	▼0.7
Total votes		55,420	100.00%	

== District 10 ==
New Jersey general election, 1987
Party	Candidate	Votes	%	±%
Democratic	John F. Russo (incumbent)	30,655	58.4%	▼4.9
Republican	Tom Blomquist	21,876	41.6%	▲4.9
Total votes		52,531	100.00%	

== District 11 ==
New Jersey general election, 1987
Party	Candidate	Votes	%	±%
Democratic	Frank Pallone (incumbent)	28,223	60.1%	▲9.7
Republican	Gerri Chappell Popkin	18,751	39.9%	▼8.6
Total votes		46,974	100.00%	

== District 12 ==
New Jersey general election, 1987
Party	Candidate	Votes	%	±%
Republican	S. Thomas Gagliano (incumbent)	31,188	67.6%	▲16.7
Democratic	Bernard B. Finan	14,965	32.4%	▼16.7
Total votes		46,153	100.00%	

== District 13 ==
New Jersey general election, 1987
Party	Candidate	Votes	%	±%
Democratic	Richard Van Wagner (incumbent)	24,155	51.0%	▼3.1
Republican	Joseph Azzolina	23,244	49.0%	▲3.1
Total votes		47,399	100.00%	

== District 14 ==
New Jersey general election, 1987
Party	Candidate	Votes	%	±%
Democratic	Francis J. McManimon (incumbent)	30,873	64.2%	▲0.7
Republican	Michael S. Richmond	17,222	35.8%	▼0.7
Total votes		48,095	100.00%	

== District 15 ==
New Jersey general election, 1987
Party	Candidate	Votes	%	±%
Democratic	Gerald R. Stockman (incumbent)	29,747	71.0%	▲3.7
Republican	Norbert E. Donelly	12,132	29.0%	▼3.7
Total votes		41,879	100.00%	

== District 16 ==
New Jersey general election, 1987
Party	Candidate	Votes	%	±%
Republican	John H. Ewing (incumbent)	28,433	70.7%	▲3.3
Democratic	Frank M. Reskin	11,764	29.3%	▼3.3
Total votes		40,197	100.00%	

== District 17 ==
New Jersey general election, 1987
Party	Candidate	Votes	%	±%
Democratic	John A. Lynch Jr. (incumbent)	18,585	63.4%	▼1.9
Republican	James J. Spera	10,729	36.6%	▲1.9
Total votes		29,314	100.00%	

== District 18 ==
New Jersey general election, 1987
Party	Candidate	Votes	%	±%
Democratic	Thomas H. Paterniti	30,790	59.2%	▲12.5
Republican	Peter P. Garibaldi (incumbent)	21,253	40.8%	▼7.1
Total votes		52,043	100.00%	

== District 19 ==
New Jersey general election, 1987
Party	Candidate	Votes	%	±%
Democratic	Laurence S. Weiss (incumbent)	25,997	58.3%	▼0.7
Republican	John G. O’Sullivan	18,570	41.7%	▲0.7
Total votes		44,567	100.00%	

== District 20 ==
New Jersey general election, 1987
Party	Candidate	Votes	%	±%
Democratic	Raymond Lesniak (incumbent)	23,183	100.00%	▲35.5
Total votes		23,183	100.00%	

== District 21 ==
New Jersey general election, 1987
Party	Candidate	Votes	%	±%
Republican	C. Louis Bassano (incumbent)	28,663	53.8%	▲3.3
Democratic	Anthony E. Russo	24,656	46.2%	▼3.3
Total votes		53,319	100.00%	

== District 22 ==
New Jersey general election, 1987
Party	Candidate	Votes	%	±%
Republican	Donald DiFrancesco (incumbent)	27,502	67.5%	▲0.9
Democratic	Thomas J. Gartland	13,267	32.5%	▼0.9
Total votes		40,769	100.00%	

== District 23 ==
New Jersey general election, 1987
Party	Candidate	Votes	%	±%
Republican	Dick Zimmer (incumbent)	27,699	100.00%	▲19.1
Total votes		27,699	100.00%	

== District 24 ==
New Jersey general election, 1987
Party	Candidate	Votes	%	±%
Republican	Wayne Dumont	34,617	100.0%	▲24.4
Total votes		34,617	100.00%	

== District 25 ==
New Jersey general election, 1987
Party	Candidate	Votes	%	±%
Republican	John H. Dorsey (incumbent)	20,463	52.7%	▼12.7
Democratic	Gordon MacInnes	18,381	47.3%	▲12.7
Total votes		38,844	100.00%	

== District 26 ==
New Jersey general election, 1987
Party	Candidate	Votes	%	±%
Republican	Leanna Brown (incumbent)	25,260	74.1%	▲5.9
Democratic	Helen Litwin	8,839	25.9%	▼5.9
Total votes		34,099	100.00%	

== District 27 ==
New Jersey general election, 1987
Party	Candidate	Votes	%	±%
Democratic	Richard Codey (incumbent)	17,064	76.4%	▲1.2
Republican	Felix (Phil) Graziano	5,270	23.6%	▼1.2
Total votes		22,334	100.00%	

== District 28 ==
New Jersey general election, 1987
Party	Candidate	Votes	%	±%
Democratic	Ronald Rice (incumbent)	10,327	77.3%	▲3.2
Republican	Michael J. Volk	3,040	22.7%	▲11.5
Total votes		13,367	100.00%	

== District 29 ==
New Jersey general election, 1987
Party	Candidate	Votes	%	±%
Democratic	Wynona M. Lipman (incumbent)	10,678	100.0%	▲14.5
Total votes		10,678	100.00%	

== District 30 ==
New Jersey general election, 1987
Party	Candidate	Votes	%	±%
Democratic	Carmen A. Orechio (incumbent)	20,949	50.1%	▼3.7
Republican	Thomas P. Zampino	18,455	44.2%	0.0
Independent	John W. Kinder	2,371	5.7%	N/A
Total votes		41,775	100.00%	

== District 31 ==
New Jersey general election, 1987
Party	Candidate	Votes	%	±%
Democratic	Edward T. O'Connor Jr. (incumbent)	22,980	78.1%	▼2.6
Republican	William V. Connelly	6,437	21.9%	▲2.6
Total votes		29,417	100.00%	

== District 32 ==
New Jersey general election, 1987
Party	Candidate	Votes	%	±%
Democratic	Thomas F. Cowan (incumbent)	27,065	66.4%	▲2.6
Republican	Charles J. Catrillo	13,241	32.5%	▼0.1
Politicians Are Crooks	Herbert H. Shaw	451	1.1%	▼2.5
Total votes		40,757	100.00%	

== District 33 ==
New Jersey general election, 1987
Party	Candidate	Votes	%	±%
Democratic	Christopher Jackman (incumbent)	19,944	60.6%	▼5.9
Republican	Ronald Dario	12,668	38.5%	▲5.0
"Pride-Responsibility"	Hector Morales	282	0.9%	N/A
Total votes		32,894	100.00%	

== District 34 ==
New Jersey general election, 1987
Party	Candidate	Votes	%	±%
Republican	Joseph Bubba (incumbent)	24,622	53.9%	▲2.9
Democratic	Donald P. Hetchka	21,053	46.1%	▼2.9
Total votes		45,675	100.00%	

== District 35 ==
New Jersey general election, 1987
Party	Candidate	Votes	%	±%
Democratic	Frank X. Graves Jr. (incumbent)	21,793	100.00%	▲25.7
Total votes		21,793	100.00%	

== District 36 ==
New Jersey general election, 1987
Party	Candidate	Votes	%	±%
Democratic	Gabriel M. Ambrosio (incumbent)	22,746	51.2%	▼8.4
Republican	Kathleen A. Donovan	21,716	48.8%	▲8.4
Total votes		44,462	100.00%	

== District 37 ==
New Jersey general election, 1987
Party	Candidate	Votes	%	±%
Democratic	Matthew Feldman (incumbent)	31,342	66.6%	▲2.3
Republican	Shel Haas	15,731	33.4%	▼2.3
Total votes		47,073	100.00%	

== District 38 ==
New Jersey general election, 1987
Party	Candidate	Votes	%	±%
Democratic	Paul Contillo (incumbent)	23,574	52.6%	▲1.9
Republican	Louis F. Kosco	21,206	47.4%	▼1.9
Total votes		44,780	100.00%	

== District 39 ==
New Jersey general election, 1987
Party	Candidate	Votes	%	±%
Republican	Gerald Cardinale (incumbent)	31,585	67.1%	▲15.9
Democratic	Louis B. Redisch	15,499	32.9%	▼15.9
Total votes		47,084	100.00%	

== District 40 ==
New Jersey general election, 1987
Party	Candidate	Votes	%	±%
Republican	Henry McNamara	29,365	71.9%	▲3.2
Democratic	Terry R. Driller	11,453	28.1%	▼3.2
Total votes		40,818	100.00%	

== See also ==
- 1987 New Jersey General Assembly election
