= 1981 New Jersey Senate election =

1981 New Jersey Senate elections
- November 3, 1981

All 40 seats in the New Jersey State Senate 21 seats needed for a majority
- Turnout: 64% (▲5pp)
| | Majority party | Minority party |
|---|---|---|
| Leader | Carmen A. Orechio | Garrett Hagedorn (stepped down) |
| Party | Democratic | Republican |
| Leader since | January 10, 1978 | January 10, 1978 |
| Leader's seat | 13th (Nutley) | 40th (Midland Park) |
| Last election | 27 | 13 |
| Seats before | 24 | 13 |
| Seats won | 22 | 18 |
| Seat change | ▼2 | ▲5 |
| Popular vote | 1,083,244 | 1,069,236 |
| Percentage | 50.1% | 49.5% |
- Results by district Democratic hold Democratic gain Republican hold Republican gain
Senate President before election
Joseph P. Merlino
Democratic
Elected Senate President
Carmen Orechio
Democratic

The 1981 New Jersey Senate elections were held on November 3. The New Jersey legislature reapportioned its state legislative districts in advance of the 1981 election. The new districts resulted in many senators running for re-election in newly re-numbered districts. The election coincided with a tightly contested gubernatorial election between Thomas Kean and James Florio. Republicans gained five seats, narrowing the Democratic majority to 22–18. Democrats flipped districts 10, 14, and 15, while Republicans flipped districts 9, 12, 13, 21, 26, 34, 38, and 39.

A Federal Bureau of Investigation investigation resulted in the retirements of Senators Joseph A. Maressa and Angelo Errichetti, both of whom accepted bribes from the FBI under the guise of Arab oil sheikhs. Errichetti was convicted; Maressa was not prosecuted but opted to retire.

Contents
Incumbents not running • Summary of results
By District: 1 • 2 • 3 • 4 • 5 • 6 • 7 • 8 • 9 • 10 • 11 • 12 • 13 • 14 • 15 • 16 • 17 • 18 • 19 • 20 • 21 • 22 • 23 • 24 • 25 • 26 • 27 • 28 • 29 • 30 • 31 • 32 • 33 • 34 • 35 • 36 • 37 • 38 • 39 • 40

== Incumbents not running for re-election ==
=== Democratic ===
- Joseph A. Maressa (District 4)
- Angelo Errichetti (District 5)
- Charles B. Yates (District 7)
- Joseph P. Merlino (District 13) (ran for governor)
- William J. Hamilton (District 17) (ran for governor)
- Frank J. Dodd (District 26) (ran for governor)
- James A. Galdieri (District 32)

=== Republican ===
- James Cafiero (District 1)
- Barry T. Parker (District 8) (ran for governor)
- James Wallwork (District 25) (ran for governor)

1974–82

1982–1992

New Jersey Legislature before (left) and after (right) the 1981 redistricting

== Summary of results by State Senate district ==
| District | Incumbent | Party | Elected Senator | Party |
|---|---|---|---|---|
| 1st Legislative District | James Cafiero | Rep | James R. Hurley | Rep |
| 2nd Legislative District | Steven P. Perskie | Dem | Steven P. Perskie | Dem |
| 3rd Legislative District | Raymond Zane | Dem | Raymond Zane | Dem |
| 4th Legislative District | Joseph A. Maressa | Dem | Daniel Dalton | Dem |
| 5th Legislative District | Vacant (Note: The seat was left vacant by the expulsion of Angelo Errichetti following his conviction for federal bribery charges.) | | Walter Rand | Dem |
| 6th Legislative District | Lee Laskin | Rep | Lee Laskin | Rep |
| 7th Legislative District | Charles B. Yates | Dem | Herman T. Costello | Dem |
| 8th Legislative District | Barry T. Parker | Rep | H. James Saxton | Rep |
| 9th Legislative District | John F. Russo (Note: Redistricted to 10th district.) | Dem | Leonard T. Connors | Rep |
| 10th Legislative District | Brian T. Kennedy (Note: Redistricted to 11th district.) | Rep | John F. Russo | Dem |
| 11th Legislative District | S. Thomas Gagliano (Note: Redistricted to 12th district.) | Rep | Brian T. Kennedy | Rep |
| 12th Legislative District | Eugene Bedell (Note: Redistrict to 13th district.) | Dem | S. Thomas Gagliano | Rep |
| 13th Legislative District | Joseph P. Merlino (Note: Redistricted to 15th district.) | Dem | John P. Gallagher | Rep |
| 14th Legislative District | Walter E. Foran (Note: Redistricted to 23rd district.) | Rep | Francis J. McManimon | Dem |
| 15th Legislative District | Wayne Dumont (Note: Redistricted to 24th district.) | Rep | Gerald R. Stockman | Dem |
| 16th Legislative District | John H. Ewing | Rep | John H. Ewing | Rep |
| 17th Legislative District | William J. Hamilton | Dem | John A. Lynch Jr. | Dem |
| 18th Legislative District | Vacant (Note: The seat had been vacant since Bernard J. Dwyer resigned to take his seat in the United States House of Representatives.) | | James Bornheimer | Dem |
| 19th Legislative District | Laurence Weiss | Dem | Laurence Weiss | Dem |
| 20th Legislative District | Anthony E. Russo (Note: Redistricted to 21st district.) | Dem | John Gregorio | Dem |
| 21st Legislative District | John Gregorio (Note: Redistricted to 20th district.) | Dem | C. Louis Bassano | Rep |
| 22nd Legislative District | Donald DiFrancesco | Rep | Donald DiFrancesco | Rep |
| 23rd Legislative District | John H. Dorsey (Note: Redistricted to 25th district.) | Rep | Walter E. Foran | Rep |
| 24th Legislative District | James P. Vreeland (Note: Redistricted to 26th district.) | Rep | Wayne Dumont | Rep |
| 25th Legislative District | James Wallwork | Rep | John H. Dorsey | Rep |
| 26th Legislative District | Frank J. Dodd | Dem | James P. Vreeland | Rep |
| 27th Legislative District | Carmen Orechio (Note: Redistricted to 30th district.) | Dem | Richard Codey | Dem |
| 28th Legislative District | John P. Caufield | Dem | John P. Caufield | Dem |
| 29th Legislative District | Wynona Lipman | Dem | Wynona Lipman | Dem |
| 30th Legislative District | Frank E. Rodgers (Note: Redistricted to 32nd district.) | Dem | Carmen Orechio | Dem |
| 31st Legislative District | Wally Sheil | Dem | Edward T. O'Connor Jr. | Dem |
| 32nd Legislative District | James A. Galdieri | Dem | Frank E. Rodgers | Dem |
| 33rd Legislative District | William Musto | Dem | William Musto | Dem |
| 34th Legislative District | Joseph Hirkala (Note: Redistricted to 36th district.) | Dem | Joseph Bubba | Rep |
| 35th Legislative District | Frank X. Graves Jr. | Dem | Frank X. Graves Jr. | Dem |
| 36th Legislative District | Vacant (Note: This seat had been vacant since the resignation of Anthony Scardino to join the Hackensack Meadowlands Development Commission.) | | Joseph Hirkala | Dem |
| 37th Legislative District | Matthew Feldman | Dem | Matthew Feldman | Dem |
| 38th Legislative District | John Skevin | Dem | John Paolella | Rep |
| 39th Legislative District | Frank Herbert | Dem | Gerald Cardinale | Rep |
| 40th Legislative District | Garrett W. Hagedorn | Rep | Garrett Hagedorn | Rep |

=== Close races ===
Seats where the margin of victory was under 10%:

1. District 30, 1.7%
2. District 33, 3.2%
3. District 2, 3.4%
4. District 21, 3.8% gain
5. District 18, 4.2%
6. District 38, 4.5% gain
7. District 20, 4.6%
8. District 34, 5.4% gain
9. District 1, 7.6%

== District 1 ==
The first district consisted of all of Cape May County and the Cumberland municipalities of Vineland, Millville, Bridgeton, Upper Deerfield, Deerfield, and Maurice River. Prior to redistricting, it had contained all of Cumberland County.

Incumbent Senator James Cafiero retired.

=== Republican primary ===
==== Candidates ====
- James R. Hurley, Assemblyman from Millville (Regular Organization Republican-Pat Kramer Team)

==== Results ====
1981 Republican primary
| Party | Candidate | Votes | % |
|---|---|---|---|
| Republican | James R. Hurley | 11,809 | 100.00% |
| Total votes | | 11,809 | 100.00% |

=== Democratic primary ===
==== Candidates ====
- Edward H. Salmon, Cumberland County Freeholder and former mayor of Millville (Sound Off for South Jersey)

==== Results ====
1981 Democratic primary
| Party | Candidate | Votes | % |
|---|---|---|---|
| Democratic | Edward H. Salmon | 6,961 | 100.00% |
| Total votes | | 6,961 | 100.00% |

=== General election ===
==== Candidates ====
- James R. Hurley, Assemblyman from Millville (Republican)
- Edward H. Salmon, Cumberland County Freeholder and former mayor of Millville (Democratic)

==== Results ====
1981 general election
| Party | Candidate | Votes | % |
|---|---|---|---|
| Republican | James R. Hurley | 32,443 | 53.8% |
| Democratic | Edward H. Salmon | 27,862 | 46.2% |
| Total votes | | 60,305 | 100.0% |

== District 2 ==
The second district consisted of Atlantic County except for the municipalities of Folsom, Buena, and Buena Vista, which were removed in redistricting. Redistricting also removed Bass River and Washington in Burlington County and Tuckerton and Little Egg Harbor in Ocean County.

=== Democratic primary ===
==== Candidates ====
- Richard "Reds" Lavin, labor organizer and state government liaison for the Atlantic City Department of Parks and Public Property (The Alternative)
- Steven Perskie, incumbent Senator since 1978 (Endorsed By Atlantic County Democratic Convention)

==== Results ====
1981 Democratic primary
| Party | Candidate | Votes | % |
|---|---|---|---|
| Democratic | Steven P. Perskie (inc.) | 5,400 | 83.79% |
| Democratic | Reds Lavin | 1,045 | 16.21% |
| Total votes | | 6,445 | 100.00% |

=== Republican primary ===
==== Candidates ====
- Joseph McGahn, former Democratic Senator (Regular Republican)

==== Results ====
1981 Republican primary
| Party | Candidate | Votes | % |
|---|---|---|---|
| Republican | Joseph McGahn | 8,941 | 100.00% |
| Total votes | | 8,941 | 100.00% |

=== General election ===
==== Candidates ====
- Joseph McGahn, former Democratic Senator (Republican)
- Steven Perskie, incumbent Senator since 1978 (Democratic)

==== Results ====
1981 general election
| Party | Candidate | Votes | % |
|---|---|---|---|
| Democratic | Steven P. Perskie (incumbent) | 29,843 | 51.7 |
| Republican | Joseph L. McGahn | 27,890 | 48.3 |
| Total votes | | 57,733 | 100.0 |

== District 3 ==
=== Democratic primary ===
==== Candidates ====
- Raymond Zane, incumbent Senator (Regular Democratic Organization)

==== Results ====
1981 Democratic primary
| Party | Candidate | Votes | % |
|---|---|---|---|
| Democratic | Raymond Zane (inc.) | 13,337 | 100.00% |
| Total votes | | 13,337 | 100.00% |

=== Republican primary ===
==== Candidates ====
- D. Paul McMahon Jr., owner of a Woodbury electrical contracting firm

==== Results ====
1981 Republican primary
| Party | Candidate | Votes | % |
|---|---|---|---|
| Republican | D. Paul McMahon Jr. | 8,015 | 100.00% |
| Total votes | | 8,015 | 100.00% |

=== General election ===
==== Candidates ====
- D. Paul McMahon Jr., owner of a Woodbury electrical contracting firm (Republican)
- Raymond Zane, incumbent Senator (Democratic)

==== Results ====
1981 general election
| Party | Candidate | Votes | % |
|---|---|---|---|
| Democratic | Raymond J. Zane (incumbent) | 37,613 | 63.2 |
| Republican | D. Paul McMahon, Jr. | 21,903 | 36.8 |
| Total votes | | 59,516 | 100.0 |

== District 4 ==
=== Democratic primary ===
==== Candidates ====
- Daniel J. Dalton, Assemblyman from Laurel Springs (Regular Democratic Organization)
- Kenneth A. Gewertz, former Assemblyman from Deptford Township (Regular Democrat Organization)

This primary was a rematch of the 1979 Assembly election, in which Dalton and running mate Dennis L. Riley, who ran with the support of Congressman Jim Florio, unseated Gewertz and Francis J. Gorman, who had the support of Camden mayor and State Senator Angelo Errichetti. Each candidate had the support of their respective county party; Dalton in Camden and Gewertz in Gloucester.

==== Results ====
1981 Democratic primary
| Party | Candidate | Votes | % |
|---|---|---|---|
| Democratic | Daniel J. Dalton | 10,448 | 65.63% |
| Democratic | Kenneth A. Gewertz | 5,471 | 34.37% |
| Total votes | | 15,919 | 100.00% |

=== Republican primary ===
==== Candidates ====
- Connie B. Roggio, Gloucester Township councilwoman (Regular Republican Organization)
- Frank B. Smith (Organization of Regular Republicans)

==== Results ====
1981 Republican primary
| Party | Candidate | Votes | % |
|---|---|---|---|
| Republican | Frank B. Smith | 2,766 | 60.12% |
| Republican | Connie Roggio | 1,835 | 39.88% |
| Total votes | | 4,601 | 100.00% |

=== General election ===
==== Candidates ====
- Daniel J. Dalton (Democratic)
- Frank B. Smith (Republican)

==== Results ====
1981 general election
| Party | Candidate | Votes | % |
|---|---|---|---|
| Democratic | Daniel J. Dalton | 32,386 | 63.3 |
| Republican | Frank B. Smith | 18,755 | 36.7 |
| Total votes | | 51,141 | 100.0 |

== District 5 ==
=== Democratic primary ===
==== Candidates ====
- Walter Rand, Assemblyman from Camden (Regular Democratic Organization)
- Ernest F. Schuck, Assemblyman from Barrington (Camden County Democrat Organization)

Unlike the neighboring fourth district, both Assemblymen Rand and Schuck were considered allies of Errichetti and shared a legislative office. Their friendly relations were maintained throughout a "kid-gloves" campaign, despite the close margin.

Ultimately, Florio struck an alliance with Rand which propelled him over the top as Florio ran up large numbers in the gubernatorial race.

==== Results ====
1981 Democratic primary
| Party | Candidate | Votes | % |
|---|---|---|---|
| Democratic | Walter Rand | 9,595 | 54.27% |
| Democratic | Ernest F. Schuck | 8,085 | 45.73% |
| Total votes | | 17,680 | 100.00% |

=== Republican primary ===
==== Candidates ====
- John H. Lyons Jr. (Regular Republican Organization of Camden County)

==== Results ====
1981 Republican primary
| Party | Candidate | Votes | % |
|---|---|---|---|
| Republican | John H. Lyons Jr. | 2,338 | 100.00% |
| Total votes | | 2,338 | 100.00% |

=== General election ===
==== Candidates ====
- John H. Lyons Jr. (Republican)
- Walter Rand, Assemblyman from Camden (Democratic)

1981 general election
| Party | Candidate | Votes | % |
|---|---|---|---|
| Democratic | Walter Rand | 32,866 | 72.0 |
| Republican | John H. Lyons, Jr. | 12,800 | 28.0 |
| Total votes | | 45,666 | 100.0 |

== District 6 ==
=== Republican primary ===
==== Candidates ====
- Lee Laskin, incumbent Senator since 1978 (Organization of Regular Republicans)

==== Results ====
1981 Republican primary
| Party | Candidate | Votes | % |
|---|---|---|---|
| Republican | Lee B. Laskin (incumbent) | 7,777 | 100.00% |
| Total votes | | 7,777 | 100.00% |

=== Democratic primary ===
==== Candidates ====
- James Greenberg (Regular Democratic Organization)

==== Results ====
1981 Democratic primary
| Party | Candidate | Votes | % |
|---|---|---|---|
| Democratic | James Greenberg | 11,663 | 100.00% |
| Total votes | | 11,663 | 100.00% |

=== General election ===
==== Candidates ====
- James Greenberg (Democratic)
- Lee Laskin, incumbent Senator since 1978 (Republican)

1981 general election
| Party | Candidate | Votes | % |
|---|---|---|---|
| Republican | Lee B. Laskin (incumbent) | 36,279 | 56.7 |
| Democratic | James Greenberg | 27,735 | 43.3 |
| Total votes | | 64,014 | 100.0 |

== District 7 ==
=== Democratic primary ===
==== Candidates ====
- Herman T. Costello, Assemblyman from Burlington and mayor of Burlington since 1964 (Regular Democratic Organization)

==== Results ====
1981 Democratic primary
| Party | Candidate | Votes | % |
|---|---|---|---|
| Democratic | Herman T. Costello | 11,723 | 100.00% |
| Total votes | | 11,723 | 100.00% |

=== Republican primary ===
==== Candidates ====
- Michael J. Conda (Regular Republican Organization)

==== Results ====
1981 Republican primary
| Party | Candidate | Votes | % |
|---|---|---|---|
| Republican | Michael J. Conda | 6,807 | 100.00% |
| Total votes | | 6,807 | 100.00% |

=== General election ===
==== Candidates ====
- Michael J. Conda (Republican)
- Herman T. Costello, Assemblyman from Burlington and mayor of Burlington since 1964 (Democratic)

1981 general election
| Party | Candidate | Votes | % |
|---|---|---|---|
| Democratic | Herman T. Costello | 31,172 | 57.1 |
| Republican | Michael J. Conda | 23,391 | 42.9 |
| Total votes | | 54,563 | 100.0 |

== District 8 ==
=== Republican primary ===
==== Candidates ====
- Jim Saxton, Assemblyman from Mount Holly (Regular Republican Organization)

==== Results ====
1981 Republican primary
| Party | Candidate | Votes | % |
|---|---|---|---|
| Republican | H. James Saxton | 10,384 | 100.00% |
| Total votes | | 10,384 | 100.00% |

=== Democratic primary ===
==== Candidates ====
- Raymond J. Storck (Regular Democratic Organization)

==== Results ====
1981 Democratic primary
| Party | Candidate | Votes | % |
|---|---|---|---|
| Democratic | Raymond J. Storck | 7,328 | 100.00% |
| Total votes | | 7,328 | 100.00% |

=== General election ===
==== Candidates ====
- Jim Saxton, Assemblyman from Mount Holly (Republican)
- Raymond J. Storck (Democratic)

1981 general election
| Party | Candidate | Votes | % |
|---|---|---|---|
| Republican | H. James Saxton | 33,132 | 65.7 |
| Democratic | Raymond J. Storck | 17,314 | 34.3 |
| Total votes | | 50,446 | 100.0 |

== District 9 ==
=== Republican primary ===
==== Candidates ====
- Leonard T. Connors, Ocean County Freeholder and mayor of Surf City since 1966 (Regular Republican Organization of Ocean County)

==== Results ====
1981 Republican primary
| Party | Candidate | Votes | % |
|---|---|---|---|
| Republican | Leonard T. Connors | 13,697 | 100.00% |
| Total votes | | 13,697 | 100.00% |

=== Democratic primary ===
==== Candidates ====
- Wesley K. Bell, former mayor of Stafford Township and candidate for U.S. Senate in 1978 (Official Regular Democrat Organization)

==== Results ====
1981 Democratic primary
| Party | Candidate | Votes | % |
|---|---|---|---|
| Democratic | Wesley K. Bell | 6,822 | 100.00% |
| Total votes | | 6,822 | 100.00% |

=== General election ===
==== Candidates ====
- Wesley K. Bell, former mayor of Stafford Township and candidate for U.S. Senate in 1978 (Democratic)
- Leonard T. Connors, Ocean County Freeholder and mayor of Surf City since 1966 (Republican)

1981 general election
| Party | Candidate | Votes | % |
|---|---|---|---|
| Republican | Leonard T. Connors, Jr. | 40,656 | 64.4 |
| Democratic | Wesley K. Bell | 22,441 | 35.6 |
| Total votes | | 63,097 | 100.0 |

== District 10 ==
All of the new tenth district had previously been contained within the boundaries of the ninth district in Ocean County. It consisted of Lakewood, Brick, and Toms River, and the shore towns of Lavallette, Mantoloking, Bay Head, Seaside Park, Seaside Heights, Ocean Gate, Point Pleasant Beach, and Point Pleasant.

=== Democratic primary ===
==== Candidates ====
- John F. Russo, incumbent Senator since 1974 (Democratic)

==== Results ====
1981 Democratic primary
| Party | Candidate | Votes | % |
|---|---|---|---|
| Democratic | John F. Russo (incumbent) | 7,941 | 100.00% |
| Total votes | | 7,941 | 100.00% |

=== Republican primary ===
==== Candidates ====
- Hazel Gluck, Assemblywoman from Lakewood (Republican)

==== Results ====
1981 Republican primary
| Party | Candidate | Votes | % |
|---|---|---|---|
| Republican | Hazel Gluck | 11,728 | 100.00% |
| Total votes | | 11,728 | 100.00% |

=== General election ===
==== Candidates ====
- Hazel Gluck, Assemblywoman from Lakewood (Republican)
- John F. Russo, incumbent Senator since 1974 (Democratic)

===== Results =====
1981 general election
| Party | Candidate | Votes | % |
|---|---|---|---|
| Democratic | John F. Russo (incumbent) | 38,166 | 58.6 |
| Republican | Hazel S. Gluck | 26,933 | 41.4 |
| Total votes | | 65,099 | 100.0 |

== District 11 ==
=== Republican primary ===
==== Candidates ====
- Brian T. Kennedy, incumbent Senator since 1978 (Regular Republican)

==== Results ====
1981 Republican primary
| Party | Candidate | Votes | % |
|---|---|---|---|
| Republican | Leonard T. Connors | 13,697 | 100.00% |
| Total votes | | 13,697 | 100.00% |

=== Democratic primary ===
==== Candidates ====
- George Callas (Regular Democratic Organization of Monmouth County)

==== Results ====
1981 Democratic primary
| Party | Candidate | Votes | % |
|---|---|---|---|
| Democratic | George Callas | 6,506 | 100.00% |
| Total votes | | 6,506 | 100.00% |

=== General election ===
==== Candidates ====
- George Callas (Democratic)
- Stan Johnson (Citizens)
- Brian T. Kennedy, incumbent Senator since 1978 (Republican)

===== Results =====
1981 general election
| Party | Candidate | Votes | % |
|---|---|---|---|
| Republican | Brian T. Kennedy (incumbent) | 32,063 | 57.8 |
| Democratic | George Callas | 22,807 | 41.1 |
| Citizens | Stan Johnson | 574 | 1.0 |
| Total votes | | 55,444 | 100.0 |

== District 12 ==
=== Republican primary ===
==== Candidates ====
- S. Thomas Gagliano, incumbent Senator since 1978 (Regular Republican)

==== Results ====
1981 Republican primary
| Party | Candidate | Votes | % |
|---|---|---|---|
| Republican | S. Thomas Gagliano (incumbent) | 8,456 | 100.00% |
| Total votes | | 8,456 | 100.00% |

=== Democratic primary ===
==== Candidates ====
- Roger J. Kane (Regular Democratic Organization of Monmouth County)

==== Results ====
1981 Democratic primary
| Party | Candidate | Votes | % |
|---|---|---|---|
| Democratic | Roger J. Kane | 7,755 | 100.00% |
| Total votes | | 7,755 | 100.00% |

=== General election ===
==== Candidates ====
- S. Thomas Gagliano, incumbent Senator since 1978 (Republican)
- Roger J. Kane (Democratic)

===== Results =====
1981 general election
| Party | Candidate | Votes | % |
|---|---|---|---|
| Republican | S. Thomas Gagliano (incumbent) | 33,521 | 59.1 |
| Democratic | Roger J. Kane | 23,169 | 40.9 |
| Total votes | | 56,690 | 100.0 |

== District 13 ==
=== Democratic primary ===
==== Candidates ====
- Eugene J. Bedell, incumbent Senator since 1974 (Regular Democratic Organization of Monmouth County)

==== Results ====
1981 Democratic primary
| Party | Candidate | Votes | % |
|---|---|---|---|
| Democratic | Eugene J. Bedell (incumbent) | 8,143 | 100.00% |
| Total votes | | 8,143 | 100.00% |

=== Republican primary ===
==== Candidates ====
- John P. Gallagher, investment banker and former executive director of the New Jersey Highway Authority (Regular Republican)

==== Results ====
1981 Republican primary
| Party | Candidate | Votes | % |
|---|---|---|---|
| Republican | John P. Gallagher | 5,930 | 100.00% |
| Total votes | | 5,930 | 100.00% |

=== General election ===
==== Candidates ====
- Eugene J. Bedell, incumbent Senator since 1974 (Democratic)
- John P. Gallagher, investment banker and former executive director of the New Jersey Highway Authority (Republican)

==== Results ====
1981 general election
| Party | Candidate | Votes | % |
|---|---|---|---|
| Republican | John P. Gallagher | 27,988 | 51.6 |
| Democratic | Eugene J. Bedell (incumbent) | 26,268 | 48.4 |
| Total votes | | 54,256 | 100.0 |

== District 14 ==
=== Democratic primary ===
==== Candidates ====
- Francis J. McManimon, Assemblyman from Hamilton Township (Regular Democrat Organization)

==== Results ====
1981 Democratic primary
| Party | Candidate | Votes | % |
|---|---|---|---|
| Democratic | Francis J. McManimon | 9,180 | 100.00% |
| Total votes | | 9,180 | 100.00% |

=== Republican primary ===
==== Candidates ====
- Thomas Colitsas

==== Results ====
1981 Republican primary
| Party | Candidate | Votes | % |
|---|---|---|---|
| Republican | Thomas Colitsas | 4,986 | 100.00% |
| Total votes | | 4,986 | 100.00% |

=== General election ===
==== Candidates ====
- S. Thomas Gagliano, incumbent Senator since 1978 (Republican)
- Roger J. Kane (Democratic)

==== Results ====
1981 general election
| Party | Candidate | Votes | % |
|---|---|---|---|
| Democratic | Francis J. McManimon | 31,742 | 57.7 |
| Republican | Thomas Colitsas | 23,296 | 42.3 |
| Total votes | | 55,038 | 100.0 |

== District 15 ==
Incumbent Senator Joseph Merlino, who had been redistricted from the 13th district, opted to run for Governor of New Jersey.

=== Democratic primary ===
==== Candidates ====
- Paul J. Sollami, Mercer County Freeholder (Regular Democratic Organization)
- Gerald R. Stockman, Assemblyman from Trenton (Regular Organization Democrat)

Sollami had the support of county party chair and power broker Richard J. Coffee.

==== Results ====
1981 Democratic primary
| Party | Candidate | Votes | % |
|---|---|---|---|
| Democratic | Gerald Stockman | 10,709 | 54.53% |
| Democratic | Paul J. Sollami | 8,831 | 45.47% |
| Total votes | | 19,640 | 100.00% |

=== Republican primary ===
==== Candidates ====
- Carmen J. Armenti, former Democratic mayor of Trenton

==== Results ====
1981 Republican primary
| Party | Candidate | Votes | % |
|---|---|---|---|
| Republican | Carmen Armenti | 5,394 | 100.00% |
| Total votes | | 5,394 | 100.00% |

=== General election ===
==== Candidates ====
- Carmen J. Armenti, former mayor of Trenton (Republican)
- Gerald R. Stockman, Assemblyman from Trenton (Democratic)

===== Results =====
1981 general election
| Party | Candidate | Votes | % |
|---|---|---|---|
| Democratic | Gerald R. Stockman | 30,243 | 56.4 |
| Republican | Carmen J. Armenti | 23,410 | 43.6 |
| Total votes | | 53,653 | 100.0 |

== District 16 ==
=== Republican primary ===
==== Candidates ====
- John H. Ewing, incumbent Senator since 1978 (Somerset County Republican Organization)

==== Results ====
1981 Republican primary
| Party | Candidate | Votes | % |
|---|---|---|---|
| Republican | John H. Ewing (incumbent) | 14,485 | 100.00% |
| Total votes | | 14,485 | 100.00% |

=== Democratic primary ===
==== Candidates ====
- John F. Guerrera (Regular Democratic Organization)

==== Results ====
1981 Democratic primary
| Party | Candidate | Votes | % |
|---|---|---|---|
| Democratic | John F. Guerrera | 4,326 | 100.00% |
| Total votes | | 4,326 | 100.00% |

=== General election ===
==== Candidates ====
- John H. Ewing, incumbent Senator since 1978 (Republican)
- John F. Guerrera (Regular Democratic Organization)

===== Results =====
1981 general election
| Party | Candidate | Votes | % |
|---|---|---|---|
| Republican | John H. Ewing (incumbent) | 38,026 | 65.5 |
| Democratic | John F. Guerrera | 20,068 | 34.5 |
| Total votes | | 58,094 | 100.0 |

== District 17 ==
=== Democratic primary ===
==== Candidates ====
- John A. Lynch Jr., mayor of New Brunswick and son of former Senator John A. Lynch (Regular Democratic Organization)

==== Results ====
1981 Democratic primary
| Party | Candidate | Votes | % |
|---|---|---|---|
| Democratic | John A. Lynch | 9,578 | 100.00% |
| Total votes | | 9,578 | 100.00% |

=== Republican primary ===
==== Candidates ====
- Donald J. Douglas (Middlesex County Republican Organization, Inc.)
- John Giammarco (Middlesex County Regular Republican Organization)

==== Results ====
1981 Republican primary
| Party | Candidate | Votes | % |
|---|---|---|---|
| Republican | Donald J. Douglas | 2,210 | 66.93% |
| Republican | John Giammarco | 1,092 | 33.07% |
| Total votes | | 3,302 | 100.00% |

=== General election ===
==== Candidates ====
- Donald J. Douglas (Republican)
- Paul Lennon (Citizens)
- John A. Lynch Jr., mayor of New Brunswick and son of former Senator John A. Lynch (Democratic)

1981 general election
| Party | Candidate | Votes | % |
|---|---|---|---|
| Democratic | John A. Lynch | 25,761 | 60.6 |
| Republican | Donald J. Douglas | 15,280 | 35.9 |
| Citizens | Paul Lennon | 1,484 | 3.5 |
| Total votes | | 42,525 | 100.0 |

== District 18 ==
=== Democratic primary ===
==== Candidates ====
- James Bornheimer, Assemblyman from East Brunswick (Regular Democratic Organization)
- Samuel V. Convery Jr. (Responsible Democrat)

==== Results ====
1981 Democratic primary
| Party | Candidate | Votes | % |
|---|---|---|---|
| Democratic | James Bornheimer | 8,620 | 53.96% |
| Democratic | Samuel V. Convery Jr. | 7,354 | 46.04% |
| Total votes | | 15,974 | 100.00% |

=== Republican primary ===
==== Candidates ====
- Joseph M. Cooperstein (Middlesex County Republican Organization, Inc.)
- Peter Garibaldi, former Assemblyman from Monroe Township (Middlesex County Regular Republican Organization)

==== Results ====
1981 Republican primary
| Party | Candidate | Votes | % |
|---|---|---|---|
| Republican | Peter Garibaldi | 4,371 | 74.00% |
| Republican | Joseph M. Cooperstein | 1,536 | 26.00% |
| Total votes | | 5,907 | 100.00% |

=== General election ===
==== Candidates ====
- James Bornheimer, Assemblyman from East Brunswick (Democratic)
- Peter Garibaldi, former Assemblyman from Monroe Township (Republican)

1981 general election
| Party | Candidate | Votes | % |
|---|---|---|---|
| Democratic | James Bornheimer | 31,383 | 52.1 |
| Republican | Peter P. Garibaldi | 28,853 | 47.9 |
| Total votes | | 60,236 | 100.0 |

== District 19 ==
=== Democratic primary ===
==== Candidates ====
- Laurence S. Weiss, incumbent Senator since 1978 (Regular Democratic Organization)

==== Results ====
1981 Democratic primary
| Party | Candidate | Votes | % |
|---|---|---|---|
| Democratic | Laurence S. Weiss (incumbent) | 10,616 | 100.00% |
| Total votes | | 10,616 | 100.00% |

=== Republican primary ===
==== Candidates ====
- Edmund S. Kaboski (Middlesex County Republican Organization, Inc.)

==== Results ====
1981 Republican primary
| Party | Candidate | Votes | % |
|---|---|---|---|
| Republican | Edmund S. Kaboski | 1,750 | 100.00% |
| Total votes | | 1,750 | 100.00% |

=== General election ===
==== Candidates ====
- Edmund S. Kaboski (Republican)
- Laurence S. Weiss, incumbent Senator since 1978 (Democratic)

===== Results =====
1981 general election
| Party | Candidate | Votes | % |
|---|---|---|---|
| Democratic | Laurence S. Weiss (incumbent) | 31,446 | 60.4 |
| Republican | Edmund S. Kaboski | 20,582 | 39.6 |
| Total votes | | 52,028 | 100.0 |

== District 20 ==
=== Democratic primary ===
==== Candidates ====
- John T. Gregorio, incumbent Senator since 1978 and mayor of Linden (Regular Democratic Organization of Union County)

==== Results ====
1981 Democratic primary
| Party | Candidate | Votes | % |
|---|---|---|---|
| Democratic | John T. Gregorio (incumbent) | 13,122 | 100.00% |
| Total votes | | 13,122 | 100.00% |

=== Republican primary ===
==== Candidates ====
- John Fenick (Regular Organization Republican of Union County)

==== Results ====
1981 Republican primary
| Party | Candidate | Votes | % |
|---|---|---|---|
| Republican | John Fenick | 3,519 | 100.00% |
| Total votes | | 3,519 | 100.00% |

=== General election ===
==== Candidates ====
- John Fenick (Republican)
- John T. Gregorio, incumbent Senator since 1978 and mayor of Linden (Democratic)

===== Results =====
1981 general election
| Party | Candidate | Votes | % |
|---|---|---|---|
| Democratic | John T. Gregorio (incumbent) | 25,340 | 52.3% |
| Republican | John Fenick | 23,087 | 47.7% |
| Total votes | | 48,427 | 100.0 |

== District 21 ==
=== Democratic primary ===
==== Candidates ====
- Anthony E. Russo, incumbent Senator since 1978 and mayor of Union Township (Regular Democratic Organization of Union County)

==== Results ====
1981 Democratic primary
| Party | Candidate | Votes | % |
|---|---|---|---|
| Democratic | Anthony E. Russo (incumbent) | 9,516 | 100.00% |
| Total votes | | 9,516 | 100.00% |

=== Republican primary ===
==== Candidates ====
- C. Louis Bassano, Assemblyman from Union Township (Regular Organization Republican of Union County)

==== Results ====
1981 Republican primary
| Party | Candidate | Votes | % |
|---|---|---|---|
| Republican | C. Louis Bassano | 10,693 | 100.00% |
| Total votes | | 10,693 | 100.00% |

=== General election ===
==== Candidates ====
- C. Louis Bassano, Assemblyman from Union Township (Republican)
- Anthony E. Russo, incumbent Senator since 1978 and mayor of Union Township (Democratic)

===== Results =====
1981 general election
| Party | Candidate | Votes | % |
|---|---|---|---|
| Republican | C. Louis Bassano | 36,957 | 51.9 |
| Democratic | Anthony E. Russo (incumbent) | 34,252 | 48.1 |
| Total votes | | 71,209 | 100.0 |

== District 22 ==
=== Republican primary ===
==== Candidates ====
- Anthony J. Crincoli (Regular Republican Party)
- Donald DiFrancesco, incumbent Senator since 1979 (Regular Organization Republican of Union County)

==== Results ====
1981 Republican primary
| Party | Candidate | Votes | % |
|---|---|---|---|
| Republican | Donald DiFrancesco (incumbent) | 13,752 | 77.46% |
| Republican | Anthony J. Crincoli | 4,002 | 22.54% |
| Total votes | | 17,754 | 100.00% |

=== Democratic primary ===
==== Candidates ====
- Frank Fiorito (Democratic Party—Organization)

==== Results ====
1981 Democratic primary
| Party | Candidate | Votes | % |
|---|---|---|---|
| Democratic | Frank Fiorito | 6,997 | 100.00% |
| Total votes | | 6,997 | 100.00% |

=== General election ===
==== Candidates ====
- Donald DiFrancesco, incumbent Senator since 1979 (Republican)
- Frank Fiorito (Democratic)

===== Results =====
1981 general election
| Party | Candidate | Votes | % |
|---|---|---|---|
| Republican | Donald DiFrancesco (incumbent) | 46,330 | 67.9 |
| Democratic | Frank Fiorito | 21,876 | 32.1 |
| Total votes | | 68,206 | 100.0 |

== District 23 ==
=== Republican primary ===
==== Candidates ====
- Walter Foran, incumbent Senator since 1977 (Regular Republican Organization)

==== Results ====
1981 Republican primary
| Party | Candidate | Votes | % |
|---|---|---|---|
| Republican | Walter Foran (incumbent) | 11,291 | 100.00% |
| Total votes | | 11,291 | 100.00% |

=== Democratic primary ===
==== Candidates ====
- Samuel J. Gugliemini (Regular Democratic Organization)

==== Results ====
1981 Democratic primary
| Party | Candidate | Votes | % |
|---|---|---|---|
| Democratic | Samuel J. Gugliemini | 4,868 | 100.00% |
| Total votes | | 4,868 | 100.00% |

=== General election ===
==== Candidates ====
- Walter Foran, incumbent Senator since 1977 (Republican)
- Samuel J. Gugliemini (Democratic)

===== Results =====
1981 general election
| Party | Candidate | Votes | % |
|---|---|---|---|
| Republican | Walter E. Foran (incumbent) | 37,494 | 75.1 |
| Democratic | Samuel J. Gugliemini | 12,431 | 24.9 |
| Total votes | | 49,925 | 100.0 |

== District 24 ==
=== Republican primary ===
==== Candidates ====
- Donald J. Albanese, Assemblyman from Belvidere (Conservative Republican)
- Wayne Dumont, incumbent Senator since 1968 (Note: Senator Dumont previously served in the Senate from 1952 to 1966 but gave up his seat for one term in order to run for Governor in 1965.) (Regular Republican Organizational Candidate)

The campaign between Albanese and Dumont was possibly the most bitter in the state. Dumont had supported Albanese in his short-lived campaign for governor, only for Albanese to withdraw from that race and challenge Dumont.

==== Results ====
1981 Republican primary
| Party | Candidate | Votes | % |
|---|---|---|---|
| Republican | Wayne Dumont (incumbent) | 7,588 | 59.98% |
| Republican | Donald J. Albanese | 5,062 | 40.02% |
| Total votes | | 12,650 | 100.00% |

=== Democratic primary ===
==== Candidates ====
- Edward Gaffney (Regular Democratic Party Organization)

==== Results ====
1981 Democratic primary
| Party | Candidate | Votes | % |
|---|---|---|---|
| Democratic | Frank Fiorito | 6,997 | 100.00% |
| Total votes | | 6,997 | 100.00% |

=== General election ===
==== Candidates ====
- Wayne Dumont, incumbent Senator since 1968 (Republican)
- Edward Gaffney (Democratic)

===== Results =====
1981 general election
| Party | Candidate | Votes | % |
|---|---|---|---|
| Republican | Wayne Dumont, Jr. | 37,467 | 77.4 |
| Democratic | Edward Gaffney | 10,953 | 22.6 |
| Total votes | | 48,420 | 100.0 |

== District 25 ==
=== Republican primary ===
==== Candidates ====
- John H. Dorsey, incumbent Senator since 1978 (Regular Republican)

==== Results ====
1981 Republican primary
| Party | Candidate | Votes | % |
|---|---|---|---|
| Republican | John H. Dorsey (incumbent) | 12,675 | 100.00% |
| Total votes | | 12,675 | 100.00% |

=== Democratic primary ===
==== Candidates ====
- Horace Chamberlain (Democrat)

==== Results ====
1981 Democratic primary
| Party | Candidate | Votes | % |
|---|---|---|---|
| Democratic | Horace Chamberlain | 4,737 | 100.00% |
| Total votes | | 4,737 | 100.00% |

=== General election ===
==== Candidates ====
- Horace Chamberlain (Democratic)
- John H. Dorsey, incumbent Senator since 1978 (Republican)

===== Results =====
1981 general election
| Party | Candidate | Votes | % |
|---|---|---|---|
| Republican | John H. Dorsey | 36,433 | 68.0 |
| Democratic | Horace Chamberlain | 17,137 | 32.0 |
| Total votes | | 53,570 | 100.0 |

== District 26 ==
=== Republican primary ===
==== Candidates ====
- James P. Vreeland, incumbent Senator since 1974 (Incumbent Republican Senator)

==== Results ====
1981 Republican primary
| Party | Candidate | Votes | % |
|---|---|---|---|
| Republican | James P. Vreeland (incumbent) | 12,829 | 100.00% |
| Total votes | | 12,829 | 100.00% |

=== Democratic primary ===
==== Candidates ====
- Benjamin Steltzer (Regular Democrat)

==== Results ====
1981 Democratic primary
| Party | Candidate | Votes | % |
|---|---|---|---|
| Democratic | Benjamin Steltzer | 5,016 | 100.00% |
| Total votes | | 5,016 | 100.00% |

=== General election ===
==== Candidates ====
- Benjamin Steltzer (Democratic)
- James P. Vreeland, incumbent Senator since 1974 (Republican)

===== Results =====
1981 general election
| Party | Candidate | Votes | % |
|---|---|---|---|
| Republican | James P. Vreeland | 38,141 | 69.9 |
| Democratic | Benjamin Steltzer | 16,414 | 30.1 |
| Total votes | | 54,555 | 100.0 |

== District 27 ==
=== Democratic primary ===
==== Candidates ====
- James J. Brown ("Think" Democratic)
- Richard Codey, Assemblyman from Orange (Democratic Party Organization)
- Gayle Brody Rosen

==== Results ====
1981 Democratic primary
| Party | Candidate | Votes | % |
|---|---|---|---|
| Democratic | Richard Codey | 12,263 | 54.76% |
| Democratic | Gayle Brody Rosen | 7,347 | 32.80% |
| Democratic | James J. Brown | 2,786 | 12.44% |
| Total votes | | 22,396 | 100.00% |

=== Republican primary ===
==== Results ====
1981 Republican primary
| Party | Candidate | Votes | % |
|---|---|---|---|
| Republican | Richard E. Koehler (write-in) | 22 | 100.00% |
| Total votes | | 22 | 100.00% |

=== General election ===
==== Candidates ====
- Richard Codey, Assemblyman from Orange (Democratic)
- Richard E. Koehler (Republican)

===== Results =====
1981 general election
| Party | Candidate | Votes | % |
|---|---|---|---|
| Democratic | Richard J. Codey | 30,403 | 73.9 |
| Republican | Richard E. Koehler | 10,737 | 26.1 |
| Total votes | | 41,140 | 100.0 |

== District 28 ==
=== Democratic primary ===
==== Candidates ====
- John P. Caufield, incumbent Senator since 1979 (Democratic Party—Organization)

==== Results ====
1981 Democratic primary
| Party | Candidate | Votes | % |
|---|---|---|---|
| Democratic | John P. Caufield (incumbent) | 7,437 | 100.00% |
| Total votes | | 7,437 | 100.00% |

=== Republican primary ===
==== Results ====
1981 Republican primary
| Party | Candidate | Votes | % |
|---|---|---|---|
| Republican | Herta B. Tully (write-in) | 70 | 100.00% |
| Total votes | | 70 | 100.00% |

=== General election ===
==== Candidates ====
- John P. Caufield, incumbent Senator since 1979 (Democratic)
- Herta B. Tully (Republican)

===== Results =====
1981 general election
| Party | Candidate | Votes | % |
|---|---|---|---|
| Democratic | John P. Caufield | 20,786 | 75.0 |
| Republican | Herta B. Tully | 6,913 | 25.0 |
| Total votes | | 27,699 | 100.0 |

== District 29 ==
=== Democratic primary ===
==== Candidates ====
- Wynona Lipman, incumbent Senator since 1972 (Democratic Party—Organization)

==== Results ====
1981 Democratic primary
| Party | Candidate | Votes | % |
|---|---|---|---|
| Democratic | Wynona Lipman (incumbent) | 11,479 | 100.00% |
| Total votes | | 11,479 | 100.00% |

=== Republican primary ===
==== Candidates ====
- Louis J. Smith (Essex Republican Party Organization)

==== Results ====
1981 Republican primary
| Party | Candidate | Votes | % |
|---|---|---|---|
| Republican | Louis J. Smith | 514 | 100.00% |
| Total votes | | 514 | 100.00% |

=== General election ===
==== Candidates ====
- Wynona Lipman, incumbent Senator since 1972 (Democratic)
- Louis J. Smith (Republican)

===== Results =====
1981 general election
| Party | Candidate | Votes | % |
|---|---|---|---|
| Democratic | Wynona M. Lipman | 23,598 | 88.3 |
| Republican | Louis J. Smith | 3,125 | 11.7 |
| Total votes | | 26,723 | 100.0 |

== District 30 ==
=== Democratic primary ===
==== Candidates ====
- Carmen Orechio, incumbent Senator since 1974 and mayor of Nutley (Democratic Party—Organization)

==== Results ====
1981 Democratic primary
| Party | Candidate | Votes | % |
|---|---|---|---|
| Democratic | Carmen Orechio (incumbent) | 9,000 | 100.00% |
| Total votes | | 9,000 | 100.00% |

=== Republican primary ===
==== Candidates ====
- John I. Crecco (Essex Republican Party Organization)

==== Results ====
1981 Republican primary
| Party | Candidate | Votes | % |
|---|---|---|---|
| Republican | John I. Crecco | 9,920 | 100.00% |
| Total votes | | 9,920 | 100.00% |

=== General election ===
==== Candidates ====
- John I. Crecco (Republican)
- Arthur Kinoy (Citizens)
- Carmen Orechio, incumbent Senator since 1974 and mayor of Nutley (Democratic)

===== Results =====
1981 general election
| Party | Candidate | Votes | % |
|---|---|---|---|
| Democratic | Carmen A. Orechio | 30,990 | 49.4 |
| Republican | John I. Crecco | 29,930 | 47.7 |
| Citizens | Arthur Kinoy | 1,765 | 2.8 |
| Total votes | | 62,685 | 100.0 |

== District 31 ==
=== Democratic primary ===
==== Candidates ====
- Wally Sheil, incumbent Senator since 1978 and president of Hudson County Community College (Regular Democratic Organization)
- Edward T. O'Connor Jr. (Democratic Solidarity Coalition Team)
- James J. Richardson

==== Results ====
1981 Democratic primary
| Party | Candidate | Votes | % |
|---|---|---|---|
| Democratic | Edward T. O'Connor Jr. | 16,020 | 52.08% |
| Democratic | Wally Sheil (incumbent) | 13,021 | 42.33% |
| Democratic | James J. Richardson | 1,718 | 5.59% |
| Total votes | | 30,759 | 100.00% |

=== Republican primary ===
==== Candidates ====
- Jean C. Lane (Regular Republican Organization)

==== Results ====
1981 Republican primary
| Party | Candidate | Votes | % |
|---|---|---|---|
| Republican | Jean C. Lane | 1,505 | 100.00% |
| Total votes | | 1,505 | 100.00% |

=== General election ===
==== Candidates ====
- Jean C. Lane (Republican)
- Edward T. O'Connor Jr. (Democratic)

===== Results =====
1981 general election
| Party | Candidate | Votes | % |
|---|---|---|---|
| Democratic | Edward T. O'Connor, Jr. | 37,863 | 75.4 |
| Republican | Jean C. Lane | 12,348 | 24.6 |
| Total votes | | 50,211 | 100.0 |

== District 32 ==
=== Democratic primary ===
==== Candidates ====
- Michael J. Marino, former Assemblyman (Democratic Solidarity Coalition Team)
- Frank E. Rodgers, incumbent Senator since 1978 and mayor of Harrison (Regular Democratic Organization)

==== Results ====
1981 Democratic primary
| Party | Candidate | Votes | % |
|---|---|---|---|
| Democratic | Frank E. Rodgers (incumbent) | 15,813 | 68.51% |
| Democratic | Michael J. Marino | 7,268 | 31.49% |
| Total votes | | 23,081 | 100.00% |

=== Republican primary ===
==== Candidates ====
- Joseph F. Ward (Regular Republican Organization)

==== Results ====
1981 Republican primary
| Party | Candidate | Votes | % |
|---|---|---|---|
| Republican | Joseph F. Ward | 2,543 | 100.00% |
| Total votes | | 2,543 | 100.00% |

=== General election ===
==== Candidates ====
- Frank E. Rodgers, incumbent Senator since 1978 and mayor of Harrison (Democratic)
- Herbert H. Shaw, perennial candidate (Politicians are Crooks)
- Joseph F. Ward (Republican)

===== Results =====
1981 general election
| Party | Candidate | Votes | % |
|---|---|---|---|
| Democratic | Frank E. Rodgers | 34,150 | 63.4 |
| Republican | Joseph F. Ward | 18,551 | 34.4 |
| Politicians Are Crooks | Herbert H. Shaw | 1,171 | 2.2 |
| Total votes | | 53,872 | 100.0 |

== District 33 ==
1981 general election
| Party | Candidate | Votes | % |
|---|---|---|---|
| Democratic | William V. Musto | 24,012 | 62.0 |
| Republican | Ralph A. Montanez | 14,707 | 38.0 |
| Total votes | | 38,719 | 100.0 |

== District 34 ==
1981 general election
| Party | Candidate | Votes | % |
|---|---|---|---|
| Republican | Joseph Bubba | 31,044 | 52.7 |
| Democratic | William J. Bate | 27,843 | 47.3 |
| Total votes | | 58,887 | 100.0 |

== District 35 ==
1981 general election
| Party | Candidate | Votes | % |
|---|---|---|---|
| Democratic | Frank X. Graves Jr. | 28,439 | 74.6 |
| Republican | Frank E. Gorman | 9,693 | 25.4 |
| Total votes | | 38,132 | 100.0 |

== District 36 ==
1981 general election
| Party | Candidate | Votes | % |
|---|---|---|---|
| Democratic | Joseph Hirkala | 30,422 | 55.4 |
| Republican | Philip R. Gervato | 23,049 | 42.0 |
| Bergen Home Rule | Edna M. Perrotta | 1,395 | 2.5 |
| Total votes | | 54,866 | 100.0 |

== District 37 ==
1981 general election
| Party | Candidate | Votes | % |
|---|---|---|---|
| Democratic | Matthew Feldman | 39,299 | 61.7 |
| Republican | Barbara L. deMare | 24,416 | 38.3 |
| Total votes | | 63,715 | 100.0 |

== District 38 ==
1981 general election
| Party | Candidate | Votes | % |
|---|---|---|---|
| Republican | John B. Paolella | 30,670 | 51.0 |
| Democratic | John M. Skevin | 27,968 | 46.5 |
| Citizens For Progress | Bernard J. Focarino | 1,473 | 2.5 |
| Total votes | | 60,111 | 100.0 |

== District 39 ==
1981 general election
| Party | Candidate | Votes | % |
|---|---|---|---|
| Republican | Gerald Cardinale | 38,929 | 58.2 |
| Democratic | Francis X. Herbert | 27,948 | 41.8 |
| Total votes | | 66,877 | 100.0 |

== District 40 ==
1981 general election
| Party | Candidate | Votes | % |
|---|---|---|---|
| Republican | Garrett W. Hagedorn | 42,014 | 66.8 |
| Democratic | Mitchell Kahn | 20,835 | 33.2 |
| Total votes | | 62,849 | 100.0 |
