= Robert C. Janiszewski =

American politician (born 1945)

Robert Janiszewski

2nd Hudson County Executive
- In office 1988 – October 1, 2001
- Preceded by: Edward F. Clark Jr.
- Succeeded by: Bernard M. Hartnett Jr. (interim)

Member of the New Jersey General Assembly from the 32nd district
- In office 1978–1984 Serving with Thomas F. Cowan
- Preceded by: Michael P. Esposito; Alina Miszkiewicz
- Succeeded by: Paul Cuprowski; Anthony P. Vainieri

Personal details
- Born: September 18, 1945 (age 80)
- Party: Democratic Party

Robert Charles Janiszewski (born September 18, 1945) is an American former Democratic Party politician who served as county executive of Hudson County, New Jersey, from 1988 to 2001. In 2002 he pleaded guilty to taking more than $100,000 in bribes, and in 2005 was sentenced to 41 months in prison, despite cooperating with federal investigators. He was the highest-ranking elected official in state history ever to work undercover for the FBI.

== Early life ==
Janiszewski was born in 1945 in Jersey City, New Jersey, of paternal Polish heritage. He attended St. Joseph's School in Jersey City and St. Michael's High School in Union City. He went on to attend Jersey City State College (now New Jersey City University), receiving a B.A. degree in 1967 and an M.A. degree in sociology in 1975. He taught social sciences at Westwood High School and Hudson County Community College.

== Political career ==
In 1977, Janiszewski was elected to the New Jersey General Assembly, serving from 1978 to 1984. In 1987 he was elected county executive of Hudson County, after winning the Democratic primary against incumbent Edward J. Clark Jr., who had served in the position for 12 years.

He was later appointed a commissioner of the Port Authority of New York and New Jersey and chairman of the North Jersey Transportation Planning Authority. He entered the race for the Democratic gubernatorial primary in 1997 but withdrew before the election.

== Indictment and conviction ==
Beginning in 1999, as Janiszewski later testified, he accepted more than $20,000 from Union City psychiatrist Oscar Sandoval in exchange for renewing contracts to provide psychiatric services to the Hudson County jail, juvenile detention facility, and psychiatric hospital. Sandoval funneled some of the payments to Janiszewski through Hudson County Freeholder Nidia Dávila-Colón, who was romantically involved with Sandoval. Cooperating with the FBI, Sandoval arranged a meeting with Janiszewski in November 2000 to deliver another payment at an Atlantic City hotel room. After the meeting, FBI agents confronted Janiszewski with a videotape of him receiving a bribe from Dávila-Colón in 1999 and asked him to cooperate with their corruption investigations.

Janiszewski was allowed to remain in office for nearly a year, secretly recording conversations with his associates as part of the FBI's undercover operation in Hudson County. He resigned abruptly on September 6, 2001, and disappeared from public life. It was later revealed that he was moved out of the state of New Jersey under FBI protection. In February 2002, a reporter from The Jersey Journal located Janiszewski working at a ski shop near Hunter Mountain in the Catskill Mountains of New York, where he and his wife had a second home. The FBI moved Janiszewski again soon thereafter.

On October 3, 2002, Janiszewski pleaded guilty to taking more than $100,000 in bribes, testifying that he accepted two bribes of $5,000 each from Dávila-Colón in 1999. Dávila-Colón was indicted later that month, and her trial was held in May and June 2003, with Janiszewski as a key witness. She was convicted on five counts of extortion and mail fraud.

On March 24, 2005, U.S. District Court Judge Joel A. Pisano sentenced Janiszewski to 41 months in prison, the maximum sentence allowed under his plea agreement, despite his cooperation with investigators. Before sentencing he had been living in hiding, most recently working as a construction worker in New York.

Janiszewski was released on April 25, 2008, after serving the last four months of his sentence at a halfway house in Albany, New York.

Political offices
Preceded by Edward J. Clark Jr.	County Executive; Hudson County, New Jersey; 1988 – 2001	Succeeded by Thomas A. DeGise
