= Anthony P. Vainieri =

American politician (1927–2026)

Member of the New Jersey General Assembly from the 32nd district
- In office January 10, 1984 – January 14, 1986
- Preceded by: Thomas F. Cowan; Robert C. Janiszewski
- Succeeded by: Charles J. Catrillo; Frank J. Gargiulo

Personal details
- Born: February 15, 1927 McKees Rocks, Pennsylvania, U.S.
- Died: January 21, 2026 (aged 98)
- Party: Democratic
- Spouse: Natalie Agresta (m. 1952; died 2017)

Anthony P. Vainieri (February 15, 1927 – January 21, 2026) was an American funeral director and Democratic Party politician who represented the 32nd Legislative District in the New Jersey General Assembly from 1984 to 1986.

== Life and career ==
Owner of the Vainieri Funeral Home in North Bergen, he attended Memorial High School in West New York and enlisted in the United States Navy. He served on the North Bergen Board of Commissioners from 1971 to 1975 and was elected to the Assembly in 1983. After one term, he and fellow incumbent running mate Paul Cuprowski were both defeated by Republicans Charles J. Catrillo and Frank J. Gargiulo in the wake of Thomas Kean's landslide gubernatorial win.

Vainieri was married to Natalie Agresta from 1952 until her death in 2017. They had four children including Hudson County Commissioner Anthony Vainieri Jr. and Assemblywoman Valerie Vainieri Huttle. Anthony Jr. and Valerie were co-owners of the family's funeral home.

A resident of Norwood, New Jersey, and of Boca Raton, Florida, Vainieri died on January 21, 2026, at the age of 98.
