= Vincent Prieto =

American politician (born 1960)

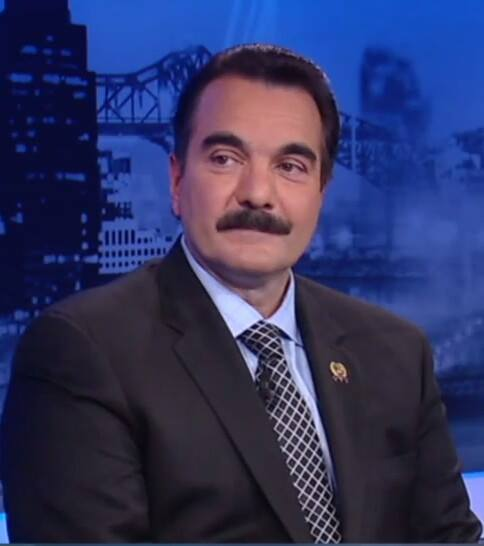

Member of the New Jersey General Assembly from the 32nd district
- In office December 13, 2004 – February 26, 2018
- Preceded by: Anthony Impreveduto
- Succeeded by: Pedro Mejia

170th Speaker of the New Jersey General Assembly
- In office January 14, 2014 – January 9, 2018
- Preceded by: Sheila Oliver
- Succeeded by: Craig Coughlin

Personal details
- Born: September 11, 1960 (age 66) Cuba
- Party: Democratic
- Spouse: Marlene Prieto
- Children: 2
- Education: Middlesex County College; Bergen Community College
- Website: Legislative website

Vincent Prieto (born September 11, 1960) is an American Democratic Party politician. He served in the New Jersey General Assembly from 2004 to 2018, where he represented the 32nd Legislative District. He formerly served as the 170th Speaker of the New Jersey General Assembly from 2014 to 2018. He was chair of the Hudson County Democratic Organization until 2018, when he was succeeded by Amy DeGise.

In February 2018, it was announced that Prieto would step down from the Assembly and succeed Wayne Hasenbalg as president and chief executive officer of the New Jersey Sports and Exposition Authority, The Sports and Exposition Authority operates the Sports Complex in East Rutherford, New Jersey.

== Biography ==
Prieto is a Cuban-American. In 1971, he and his mother took a Freedom Flight (air-lift resettlement program offering alien resident status to Cuban exiles) and moved to North Hudson County at a time when it was known as Havana on the Hudson.

He attended Middlesex County College receiving a degree in construction code technology and Bergen Community College where he received a degree for fire code technology. Outside of his legislative and political duties, he is the construction code official for the Town of Secaucus. He is a resident of Secaucus with his wife Marlene and two children.

== Political career ==
Prieto served on the Secaucus Planning Board from 1998 to 2001. He was selected by Hudson County Democratic Party leaders in December 2004 to fill the vacancy of Anthony Impreveduto, who resigned after pleading guilty to using campaign contributions for personal purposes. In the heavily Democratic-leaning 32nd district, he has not faced significant opposition in any general election since being appointed.

He garnered the support of 41 of 48 colleagues and became the Assembly Speaker in November 2013 replacing Sheila Oliver. He is the second Cuban-American to lead the Assembly after fellow Hudson County Democrat Albio Sires.

Prieto serves as the Chairman of the Legislative Services Commission. Prieto served in the Assembly as the Deputy Majority Whip from 2006 to 2011. He previously served in the Assembly as chair on the Budget Committee, the Budget Oversight Committee, and the Regulated Professions Committee; he was also a member of the Appropriations Committee, the Transportation Committee, the Public Works Committee, and the Independent Authorities Committee.

In 2013 the Hudson Reporter ranked him #7 in its list of Hudson County's 50 most influential people, and #5 in 2015. He replaced Bayonne mayor Mark Smith as the chairman of the Hudson County Democratic Organization in 2013.

=== District 32 ===
Each of the forty districts in the New Jersey Legislature has one representative in the New Jersey Senate and two members in the New Jersey General Assembly. The other representatives from the 32nd District for the 2014-2015 Legislative Session are:

- Senator Nicholas Sacco
- Assemblywoman Angelica M. Jimenez

New Jersey General Assembly
Preceded by Anthony Impreveduto	Member of the New Jersey General Assembly for the 32nd District; December 13, 2004 – February 26, 2018; With: Joan M. Quigley, Angelica M. Jimenez	Succeeded by Pedro Mejia
Political offices
Preceded by Sheila Oliver	Speaker of the New Jersey General Assembly; January 14, 2014 – January 9, 2018	Succeeded by Craig Coughlin
