= Frank Rogers =

Frank Rogers or Frank Rodgers may refer to:

- Frank Rogers (politician) (1932–1980), New Zealand politician
- Frank Rogers (record producer), American record producer
- Frank Rogers (Brookside), fictional character in TV soap Brookside
- Frank Rogers (Gaelic footballer) (1940–2023), Irish Gaelic footballer and administrator
- Frank Bradway Rogers (1914–1987), American physician and librarian
- Frank J. Rogers, member of the California legislature
- Frank O. Rogers (1876–1939), college football player and physician
- Frank Rodgers (author) (born 1944), author of The Intergalactic Kitchen
- Frank E. Rodgers (1909–2000), mayor of Harrison, New Jersey

== See also ==
- Francis Rogers (disambiguation)
