= Michael P. Esposito =

American politician

Member of the New Jersey General Assembly from the 32nd district
- In office January 8, 1974 – January 10, 1978
- Preceded by: District created
- Succeeded by: Thomas F. Cowan; Robert C. Janiszewski

Member of the New Jersey General Assembly from the 12-B district
- In office January 11, 1972 – January 8, 1974
- Preceded by: Alfred E. Suminski; David Friedland
- Succeeded by: District eliminated

Member of the New Jersey General Assembly from the 12-C district
- In office January 9, 1968 – January 11, 1972
- Preceded by: District created
- Succeeded by: Christopher Jackman; Silvio Failla

Personal details
- Born: January 22, 1913 Jersey City, New Jersey, U.S.
- Died: July 12, 1988 (aged 75)
- Party: Democratic
- Spouse: Theresa Orrico
- Education: Bucknell University

Michael P. Esposito (January 22, 1913 – July 12, 1988) was an American Democratic Party politician who served five terms in the New Jersey General Assembly from Jersey City.

== Biography ==
Esposito was born in Jersey City on January 22, 1913. He attended public schools there graduating from William L. Dickinson High School and later Bucknell University in Lewisburg, Pennsylvania. He was the president of John Esposito & Sons, Inc., a hardware and contractor supply business in Jersey City. He also served on the Jersey City Board of Education and various other committees and societies. He married the former Theresa Orrico and had one daughter.

In 1967, under a new district allotment for the General Assembly, Esposito was elected alongside fellow Democrat Christopher Jackman in Assembly District 12-C consisting of Ward E of Jersey City, Guttenberg, Hoboken, Weehawken, and West New York, New Jersey. In the next election held in 1969, District 12-C was again reconfigured to include Wards E and F in Jersey City, Hoboken, and Weehawken. In the Democratic primary, Esposito and school principal Frank R. Conwell defeated Hoboken attorney Andrew Batistich and incumbent Assemblyman Addison McLeon. For the 1971 election, Esposito's home was moved into District 12-B consisting of the central wards of Jersey City; he was elected alongside William G. Wilkerson.

After the 1971 elections, Democrats picked up exactly half of the 80 Assembly seats up for election in the state after four years of Republican control (Republicans had 39 and one was an independent). The Democrats' choice for Assembly Speaker was S. Howard Woodson, a black minister and Assemblyman from Trenton. However, Democratic Hudson County Assemblyman David Friedland had also attempted to run for speaker as well despite allegations of corruption in the previous session. At the time of the speaker vote, Esposito along with Friedland, David Wallace, and Joseph J. Higgins broke from their Democratic caucus to elect Republican Thomas Kean speaker for the session; Esposito would receive a committee chairmanship during this term in exchange for the Kean vote. Woodson would eventually become speaker during the next Assembly term.

In 1973, with the legislative districts changed again, Esposito ran in the new 32nd district consisting of parts of Jersey City and North Bergen. He won the 1973 election with Democrat Michael J. Marino and the 1975 election with Alina Miszkiewicz. However, in 1977 with the unpopularity of Governor Brendan Byrne's income tax proposal in large force, Esposito and Miszkiewicz (despite having the Hudson County Democratic Organization support) were defeated by Thomas F. Cowan and Robert C. Janiszewski.

Esposito died on July 12, 1988, at the age of 75.
