= Intergalactic Kitchen =

- Based on: The Intergalactic Kitchen by Frank Rodgers
- Starring: Lloyd Baillie; Linzi Campbell; Luke Mackle; Tamara Kennedy
- Country of origin: United Kingdom
- No. of episodes: 13 x 20 minute episodes

Production
- Running time: 20 minutes

Original release
- Network: BBC One
- Release: January 2004 – April 2004

Intergalactic Kitchen is a CBBC television series, based on the 1990 novel The Intergalactic Kitchen by Frank Rodgers. It ran from January to April 2004.

The show had a distinct reality to it, with the normal themes (romance, adventures).

Practical special effects on the show were provided by well-known YouTuber Big Clive.

== Plot ==
The show is about the Bird children (Robin, Snoo and Jay), their mother and Fleur, a rival from Snoo and Jay's school. They are about to go camping, when Mrs. Bird accidentally activates a force field and they are shot off into outer space. They attempt to get back to Earth, when a family of four aliens arrives in the kitchen. Then everything goes wrong, when Mrs. Bird accidentally climbs into the aliens' spaceship, and Mr. and Mrs. Krryptyx accidentally activate the engines, thus separating Mrs. Bird's children and Mr. and Mrs. Krryptyx's children. This leads both the children and the adults on a series of mad adventures.

== Cast ==
Role	Actor
Robin Bird	Lloyd Balie
Snoo Bird	Linzi Campbell
Jay Bird	Luke Mackle
Fleur Mason	Emma Ballantine
Krrk Krryptyx	Joshua Manning
Kirstie Krryptyx	Helen Mcalpine
Mrs. Emily Bird	Tamara Kennedy
Mr. Krryptyx	Mark McDonnel
Mrs. Krryptyx	Julie Coombe
Cheese Mite	Damian Farrell
Cheese Mite	Colin Purves
Dave	Stephen McCole
Pintoid	Callum Cuthbertson
WGA Leader	Mark Robertson

== Crew ==
Role	Name
Directors	Martin Burt
	Shiona McCubbin
	David Cairns
Writers	Frank Rodgers
	Moray Hunter
	Mark Robertson
	Robyn Charteris
	Rhiannon Tise
	David Cairns
Director of photography	Scott Ward
Camera operator	Stephen Mochrie
Production design	John Gorman
Costume design	Connie Fairbairn
Make up design	Jacqui Mallett
Art director	Adam Squires
Assistant art director	David Turbitt
Props/standby	Paul Macnamara
Assistant costume	Hannah Goldinger
Script continuity	Sarah Gill
Sound recordist	David Quinn
Production manager	Gillian Irvine
Executive producer	Simon Parsons
Series producer	Nigel R. Smith
Music and sound design	Matt Wand

== Episodes ==
Episode	Title	Summary
1	Blast Off	A family of aliens arriving on Earth for a holiday inadvertently cause the Bird family and their kitchen to blast away from their house and speed off away from the Solar System. Intent on returning the kitchen and its occupants to Earth, the aliens give chase. Something goes wrong, and human and alien children are stranded together in the kitchen as it hurtles away from the spaceship and into a black hole....
2	Brain Drain	The human and alien children's attempts to survive alone in space are not helped by discovering that they are allergic to each other, and by the Earth children suspecting that the aliens want to remove the brain of Robin, the youngest and brightest "kitchenaut".
3	It's a Mall World	The kitchenauts drift past a Shopping Planet and Fleur sneakily indulges in some retail therapy. Everything goes wrong when her credit card is refused and the shopping planet announces that it will repossess the kitchen to cover her debt.: The title is a reference to the Disneyland attraction "it's a small world".
4	Rebel Appliance	The kitchen is invaded by a race of hyper-intelligent household appliances intent on making the kitchenauts their servants.: The title is a reference to the Rebel Alliance in the first three Star Wars films: A New Hope, The Empire Strikes Back and Return of the Jedi.
5	Useless	The kitchen passes by a Rubbish Planet which assesses many of the kitchenauts favourite objects as useless and plans to remove them for recycling – including Jay!
6	The Other Mother	Mrs. Bird unexpectedly arrives in the kitchen, having miraculously crossed four hundred million light years of interstellar space. Or has she? The kitchenauts begin to suspect that their mother might not be what she appears to be.
7	Turning Point, Part One: The Diceman Cometh	Pintoid, a game playing alien, tricks the kitchenauts into playing a bizarre game of snakes, ladders and forfeits. The winner will be able to return to Earth, but the losers face an eternity of playing games on Pintoid's home planet, as well as being transformed into dice.: The title is a reference to the 1939 Eugene O'Neill play The Iceman Cometh.
8	Turning Point, Part Two: The Umpire Strikes Back	Pintoid returns to the kitchen to claim his forfeit, encountering unexpected resistance as the kitchenauts fight back.: The title is a reference to the second Star Wars film, The Empire Strikes Back. This is the second episode which title parodies Star Wars, the first one being "Rebel Appliance".
9	Virtual Mum	Realising that the Robin is missing his mother, Krrk creates a computer simulation based on everything he has overheard the human kitchenauts say about mothers.
10	Emotion Sickness	Snoo and Fleur go all out to win the affections of an unemotional Krrk, with Jay attempting to stop them!: The title parodies the condition motion sickness.
11	Take me to your Larder	An alien gourmet invades the kitchen, intent on savouring the rare delicacy of human brains. And when Snoo tries to fix everyone's brains, everyone ends up swapping bodies!: The title parodies the phrase "Take me to your Leader", which is commonly associated with alien films.; At one point, Snoo and Kirstie share Kirk's body, like what happened in the 1989 film Identity Crisis and the 1984 film All of Me.
12	Baby on Board	Fleur becomes surrogate parent to an alien slime baby.
13	Space Cowboy	The kitchenauts engage the services of Dave, a decidedly dodgy double glazer.: This is currently the last episode of the series.; The title is a reference to the opening line of the Steve Miller Band's 1974 song "The Joker".
