= Frank J. Gargiulo =

American politician (1939–2026)

Member of the New Jersey General Assembly from the 32nd district
- In office January 14, 1986 – January 12, 1988 Serving with Charles J. Catrillo
- Preceded by: Paul Cuprowski; Anthony P. Vainieri
- Succeeded by: Anthony Impreveduto; David C. Kronick

Personal details
- Born: May 18, 1939 Jersey City, New Jersey, U.S.
- Died: June 15, 2026 (aged 87) North Bergen, New Jersey, U.S.
- Party: Republican

Frank J. Gargiulo (May 18, 1939 – June 15, 2026) was an American Republican Party politician who served in the New Jersey General Assembly from the 32nd Legislative District from 1986 to 1988.

Gargiulo died in North Bergen, New Jersey on June 15, 2026, at the age of 87.
