= New Jersey's 32nd legislative district =

American legislative district

- Senator: Raj Mukherji (D)
- Assembly members: Ravi Bhalla (D); Katie Brennan (D)
- Registration: 54.2% Democratic; 12.2% Republican; 32.1% unaffiliated
- Demographics: 32.0% White; 3.7% Black/African American; 1.6% Native American; 12.1% Asian; 0.0% Hawaiian/Pacific Islander; 31.1% Other race; 19.5% Two or more races; 57.2% Hispanic
- Population: 243,875
- Voting-age population: 195,978
- Registered voters: 132,194

New Jersey's 32nd legislative district is one of 40 districts that make up the map for the New Jersey Legislature. It encompasses the Hudson County municipalities of Hoboken and portions of Jersey City.

== Demographic information ==
As of the 2020 United States census, the district had a population of 243,875, of whom 195,978 (80.4%) were of voting age. The racial makeup of the district was 77,997 (32.0%) White, 8,905 (3.7%) African American, 3,808 (1.6%) Native American, 29,614 (12.1%) Asian, 119 (0.0%) Pacific Islander, 75,874 (31.1%) from some other race, and 47,558 (19.5%) from two or more races. Hispanic or Latino of any race were 139,402 (57.2%) of the population.

The district had 132,194 registered voters as of December 1, 2023, of whom 69,052 (52.2%) were registered as Democrats, 46,598 (35.2%) were registered as unaffiliated, 14,931 (11.3%) were registered as Republicans and 1,613 (1.2%) were registered to other parties.

== Political representation ==
For the 2026–2027 session, the 32nd legislative district of the New Jersey Legislature is represented in the State Senate by Raj Mukherji (D, Jersey City) and in the General Assembly by Ravinder Bhalla (D, Hoboken) and Katie Brennan (D, Jersey City).

The legislative district overlaps with New Jersey's 8th and 10th congressional districts.

== Apportionment history ==
When the 40-district map was created in 1973, the 32nd district consisted of most of northern Jersey City and North Bergen. For the 1981 redistricting, again a northern section of Jersey City was included as well as North Bergen, Secaucus, Kearny, East Newark, and Harrison. No major changes occurred in the 1991 redistricting though a narrower portion of Jersey City made up a part of the 32nd district and Fairview and Edgewater were added to the district for the first time. In the 2001 redistricting, Edgewater was removed and the Jersey City portion of the district was relegated to just the northern corner of the city. All of Jersey City was removed in the 2011 redistricting, but Edgewater was re-added and Guttenberg and West New York were added to the district for the first time.

In February 2018, Assemblyman and former Assembly Speaker Vincent Prieto was selected to head the New Jersey Sports and Exposition Authority and subsequently resigned his seat. Democratic committee members in Bergen and Hudson Counties selected Pedro Mejia as his replacement; he was sworn in on April 12.

In the wake of the 2021 apportionment, the reconfiguration of municipalities in the 32nd and 33rd districts and the incumbent Assembly members in those districts choosing to retire or run for other elective office, the Hudson County Democratic Organization chose newcomers John Allen and Jessica Ramirez to run for the two Assembly seats, with Raj Mukherji shifting from the 33rd district to run for senate. Ramirez and Allen defeated Republican Robert Ramos, the only other candidate running in the 2023 New Jersey General Assembly election, while Mukherji defeated Republican Ilyas Mohammed.

== Election history ==
Session	Senate	General Assembly	
1974–1975	Joseph W. Tumulty (D)	Michael P. Esposito (D)	Michael J. Marino (D)
1976–1977	Joseph W. Tumulty (D)	Michael P. Esposito (D)	Alina Miszkiewicz (D)
1978–1979	David Friedland (D) (Note: Terminated on June 5, 1980 upon his convictions for various crimes)	Thomas F. Cowan (D)	Robert C. Janiszewski (D)
1980–1981	David Friedland (D)	Thomas F. Cowan (D)	Robert C. Janiszewski (D)
1980–1981	James A. Galdieri (D) (Note: Elected in a November 1980 special election, sworn in on November 10, 1980)	Thomas F. Cowan (D)	Robert C. Janiszewski (D)
1982–1983	Frank E. Rodgers (D)	Thomas F. Cowan (D)	Robert C. Janiszewski (D)
1984–1985	Thomas F. Cowan (D)	Paul Cuprowski (D)	Anthony P. Vainieri (D)
1986–1987	Thomas F. Cowan (D)	Frank J. Gargiulo (R)	Charles J. Catrillo (R)
1988–1989	Thomas F. Cowan (D)	Anthony Impreveduto (D)	David C. Kronick (D)
1990–1991	Thomas F. Cowan (D)	Anthony Impreveduto (D)	David C. Kronick (D)
1992–1993	Thomas F. Cowan (D)	Anthony Impreveduto (D)	David C. Kronick (D)
1994–1995	Nicholas Sacco (D)	Anthony Impreveduto (D)	Joan M. Quigley (D)
1996–1997	Nicholas Sacco (D)	Anthony Impreveduto (D)	Joan M. Quigley (D)
1998–1999	Nicholas Sacco (D)	Anthony Impreveduto (D)	Joan M. Quigley (D)
2000–2001	Nicholas Sacco (D)	Anthony Impreveduto (D)	Joan M. Quigley (D)
2002–2003	Nicholas Sacco (D)	Anthony Impreveduto (D)	Joan M. Quigley (D)
2004–2005	Nicholas Sacco (D)	Anthony Impreveduto (D) (Note: Resigned on November 18, 2004 following his conviction for misuse of campaign funds)	Joan M. Quigley (D)
2004–2005	Nicholas Sacco (D)	Vincent Prieto (D) (Note: Appointed to the Assembly on December 13, 2004)	Joan M. Quigley (D)
2006–2007	Nicholas Sacco (D)	Vincent Prieto (D)	Joan M. Quigley (D)
2008–2009	Nicholas Sacco (D)	Vincent Prieto (D)	Joan M. Quigley (D)
2010–2011	Nicholas Sacco (D)	Vincent Prieto (D)	Joan M. Quigley (D)
2012–2013	Nicholas Sacco (D)	Vincent Prieto (D)	Angelica M. Jimenez (D)
2014–2015	Nicholas Sacco (D)	Vincent Prieto (D)	Angelica M. Jimenez (D)
2016–2017	Nicholas Sacco (D)	Vincent Prieto (D)	Angelica M. Jimenez (D)
2018–2019	Nicholas Sacco (D)	Vincent Prieto (D) (Note: Resigned on February 26, 2018 to become President and CEO of the Sports and Exposition Authority)	Angelica M. Jimenez (D)
2018–2019	Nicholas Sacco (D)	Pedro Mejia (D) (Note: Appointed to the Assembly on April 12, 2018, won a November 6, 2018 special election to complete unexpired term)	Angelica M. Jimenez (D)
2020–2021	Nicholas Sacco (D)	Pedro Mejia (D)	Angelica M. Jimenez (D)
2022–2023	Nicholas Sacco (D)	Pedro Mejia (D)	Angelica M. Jimenez (D)
2024–2025	Raj Mukherji (D)	Jessica Ramirez (D)	John Allen (D)
2026–2027	Raj Mukherji (D)	Ravi Bhalla (D)	Katie Brennan (D)

== Election results ==
=== Senate ===
2021 New Jersey general election
Party	Candidate	Votes	%	±%
Democratic	Nicholas Sacco	23,839	71.2	▼9.0
Republican	Juan Barbadillo	9,659	28.8	▲9.0
Total votes		33,498	100.0	

New Jersey general election, 2017
Party	Candidate	Votes	%	±%
Democratic	Nicholas Sacco	23,736	80.2	▲10.0
Republican	Paul Castelli	5,842	19.8	▼10.0
Total votes		29,578	100.0	

New Jersey general election, 2013
Party	Candidate	Votes	%	±%
Democratic	Nicholas Sacco	20,098	70.2	▼10.6
Republican	Paul Castelli	8,542	29.8	▲13.5
Total votes		28,640	100.0	

2011 New Jersey general election
Party	Candidate	Votes	%
Democratic	Nicholas Sacco	16,413	80.8
Republican	Edward T. O'Neill	3,312	16.3
Politicians Are Crooks	Herbert H. Shaw	588	2.9
Total votes		20,313	100.0

2007 New Jersey general election
Party	Candidate	Votes	%	±%
Democratic	Nicholas Sacco	16,780	82.8	▲5.9
Republican	John Pluchino	3,474	17.2	▼1.0
Total votes		20,254	100.0	

2003 New Jersey general election
Party	Candidate	Votes	%	±%
Democratic	Nicholas Sacco	17,269	76.9	▲7.9
Republican	Louis S. Lusquinos Jr	4,085	18.2	▼11.2
Time For Change	Denis Jaslow	928	4.1	N/A
Eliminate Primary Elections	Louis Vernotico	160	0.7	▲0.2
Total votes		22,442	100.0	

2001 New Jersey general election
Party	Candidate	Votes	%
Democratic	Nicholas Sacco	26,991	69.0
Republican	Frank MacCormack	11,514	29.4
Politicians Are Crooks	Herbert H. Shaw	396	1.0
Eliminate Primary Elections	Louis Vernotico	196	0.5
Total votes		39,097	100.0

1997 New Jersey general election
Party	Candidate	Votes	%	±%
Democratic	Nicholas Sacco	29,386	66.7	▲7.4
Republican	John Pluchino	12,541	28.5	▼8.2
Politicians Are Crooks	Herbert H. Shaw	1,569	3.6	▲0.8
Conservative	Pat Armstrong	532	1.2	0.0
Total votes		44,028	100.0	

1993 New Jersey general election
Party	Candidate	Votes	%	±%
Democratic	Nicholas Sacco	28,280	59.3	▲2.2
Republican	James E. Humphreys	17,509	36.7	▼2.7
Politicians Are Crooks	Herbert H. Shaw	1,350	2.8	▼0.6
Conservative	Patricia M. Armstrong	560	1.2	N/A
Total votes		47,699	100.0	

1991 New Jersey general election
Party	Candidate	Votes	%
Democratic	Thomas F. Cowan	21,128	57.1
Republican	Guy Catrillo	14,577	39.4
Politicians Are Crooks	Herbert H. Shaw	1,270	3.4
Total votes		36,975	100.0

1987 New Jersey general election
Party	Candidate	Votes	%	±%
Democratic	Thomas F. Cowan, Sr.	27,065	66.4	▲2.6
Republican	Charles J. Catrillo	13,241	32.5	▼0.1
Politicians Are Crooks	Herbert H. Shaw	451	1.1	▼2.5
Total votes		40,757	100.0	

1983 New Jersey general election
Party	Candidate	Votes	%	±%
Democratic	Thomas F. Cowan	23,510	63.8	▲0.4
Republican	Joseph A. Plonski	11,997	32.6	▼1.8
Politicians Are Crooks	Herbert H. Shaw	1,318	3.6	▲1.4
Total votes		36,825	100.0	

1981 New Jersey general election
Party	Candidate	Votes	%
Democratic	Frank E. Rodgers	34,150	63.4
Republican	Joseph F. Ward	18,551	34.4
Politicians Are Crooks	Herbert H. Shaw	1,171	2.2
Total votes		53,872	100.0

Special election, 1980
Party	Candidate	Votes	%	±%
Democratic	James A. Galdieri	27,734	55.8	▼11.7
Republican	Vi Callaghan	20,230	40.7	▲10.9
Politicians Are Crooks	Mary Manzo	1,697	3.4	▲0.7
Total votes		49,661	100.0	

1977 New Jersey general election
Party	Candidate	Votes	%	±%
Democratic	David Friedland	26,813	67.5	▼7.2
Republican	Joseph W. Gallagher	11,817	29.8	▲6.9
Politicians Are Crooks	Herbert H. Shaw	1,082	2.7	N/A
Total votes		39,712	100.0	

1973 New Jersey general election
Party	Candidate	Votes	%
Democratic	Joseph W. Tumulty	35,770	74.7
Republican	John P. Errico	10,955	22.9
Abolish County Government	Robert Habermann	1,146	2.4
Total votes		47,871	100.0

=== General Assembly ===
2021 New Jersey general election
Party	Candidate	Votes	%	±%
Democratic	Angelica M. Jimenez	23,250	35.5	▼5.0
Democratic	Pedro Mejia	22,710	34.7	▼4.3
Republican	Marisela Rodriguez	9,854	15.0	▲4.7
Republican	Tamara Claudio	9,689	14.8	▲4.6
Total votes		65,503	100.0	

2019 New Jersey general election
Party	Candidate	Votes	%	±%
Democratic	Angelica M. Jimenez	14,575	40.5	▲0.5
Democratic	Pedro Mejia	14,051	39.0	▼2.0
Republican	Ann Carletta	3,711	10.3	▲0.7
Republican	Francesca Curreli	3,676	10.2	▲0.8
Total votes		36,013	100.0	

Special election, November 6, 2018
Party	Candidate	Votes	%
Democratic	Pedro Mejia	37,420	100.0
Total votes		37,420	100.0

New Jersey general election, 2017
Party	Candidate	Votes	%	±%
Democratic	Vincent Prieto	23,633	41.0	▼2.0
Democratic	Angelica M. Jimenez	23,063	40.0	▼1.4
Republican	Ann M. Corletta	5,512	9.6	▲1.8
Republican	Bartholomew J. Talamini	5,434	9.4	▲1.6
Total votes		57,642	100.0	

New Jersey general election, 2015
Party	Candidate	Votes	%	±%
Democratic	Vincent Prieto	12,276	43.0	▲6.8
Democratic	Angelica M. Jimenez	11,805	41.4	▲6.3
Republican	Lisamarie Tusa	2,223	7.8	▼6.6
Republican	Frank Miqueli	2,212	7.8	▼6.5
Total votes		28,516	100.0	

New Jersey general election, 2013
Party	Candidate	Votes	%	±%
Democratic	Vincent Prieto	19,885	36.2	▼5.1
Democratic	Angelica M. Jimenez	19,293	35.1	▼4.8
Republican	Lee Marie Gomez	7,923	14.4	▲5.4
Republican	Maria Malavasi-Quartello	7,874	14.3	▲5.8
Total votes		54,975	100.0	

New Jersey general election, 2011
Party	Candidate	Votes	%
Democratic	Vincent Prieto	15,753	41.3
Democratic	Angelica M. Jimenez	15,211	39.9
Republican	Michael J. Bartulovich	3,443	9.0
Republican	Ronald F. Tarolla	3,249	8.5
Politicians Are Crooks	April Tricoli-Busset	498	1.3
Total votes		38,154	100.0

New Jersey general election, 2009
Party	Candidate	Votes	%	±%
Democratic	Vincent Prieto	23,061	48.1	▲6.2
Democratic	Joan Quigley	22,932	47.9	▲6.1
Politicians Are Crooks	Herbert H. Shaw	1,916	4.0	N/A
Total votes		47,909	100.0	

New Jersey general election, 2007
Party	Candidate	Votes	%	±%
Democratic	Vincent Prieto	16,580	41.9	▲3.4
Democratic	Joan M. Quigley	16,544	41.8	▲2.9
Republican	Edward T. O’Neill	3,352	8.5	▼2.3
Republican	Jacob Hahn	3,069	7.8	▼2.7
Total votes		39,545	100.0	

New Jersey general election, 2005
Party	Candidate	Votes	%	±%
Democratic	Joan Quigley	25,743	38.9	▲0.3
Democratic	Vincent Prieto	25,444	38.5	▼0.2
Republican	Edward O'Neill	7,161	10.8	▲1.4
Republican	Kenneth C. Marano	6,977	10.5	▲1.1
Politicians Are Crooks	Herbert H. Shaw	847	1.3	N/A
Total votes		66,172	100.0	

New Jersey general election, 2003
Party	Candidate	Votes	%	±%
Democratic	Anthony Impreveduto	17,113	38.7	▲2.0
Democratic	Joan Quigley	17,064	38.6	▲2.2
Republican	Delia Kelly	4,157	9.4	▼4.1
Republican	Anna Crespo-Hernandez	4,136	9.4	▼4.0
Time For Change	Eric Dixon	883	2.0	N/A
Time For Change	Eugene McCrohan	828	1.9	N/A
Total votes		44,181	100.0	

New Jersey general election, 2001
Party	Candidate	Votes	%
Democratic	Anthony Impreveduto	27,648	36.7
Democratic	Joan Quigley	27,484	36.4
Republican	Frances Cohen	10,188	13.5
Republican	Esther Gatria	10,087	13.4
Total votes		75,407	100.0

New Jersey general election, 1999
Party	Candidate	Votes	%	±%
Democratic	Anthony Impreveduto	18,111	38.4	▲4.8
Democratic	Joan Quigley	17,732	37.6	▲4.3
Republican	Thomas F. Corcoran	4,893	10.4	▼4.7
Republican	Louis S. Lusquinos, Jr.	4,193	8.9	▼5.3
Politicians Are Crooks	Edith M. Shaw	1,187	2.5	▲0.8
Politicians Are Crooks	Herbert H. Shaw	1,093	2.3	N/A
Total votes		47,209	100.0	

New Jersey general election, 1997
Party	Candidate	Votes	%	±%
Democratic	Anthony Impreveduto	28,834	33.6	▼1.0
Democratic	Joan Quigley	28,519	33.3	0.0
Republican	Michael Padovano	12,965	15.1	▲0.6
Republican	Kevin Canessa, Jr.	12,201	14.2	▲0.1
Politicians Are Crooks	Frank X. Landrigan	1,434	1.7	▲0.7
Conservative	Yvonne Battaglia	634	0.7	▼0.1
Conservative	Charles W. Joyce	500	0.6	▼0.2
Natural Law	Barbara Ebel	425	0.5	N/A
Natural Law	Kenneth Ebel	224	0.3	N/A
Total votes		85,736	100.0	

New Jersey general election, 1995
Party	Candidate	Votes	%	±%
Democratic	Anthony Impreveduto	24,576	34.6	▲3.8
Democratic	Joan M. Quigley	23,636	33.3	▲3.4
Republican	Todd Hennessey	10,278	14.5	▼4.6
Republican	Paul Castelli	10,020	14.1	▼4.2
Politicians Are Crooks	Dennis E. Fitzpatrick	740	1.0	N/A
Politicians Are Crooks	Edith M. Shaw	615	0.9	▼0.3
Conservative	Yvonne Battaglia	547	0.8	N/A
Conservative	Pat Armstrong	539	0.8	N/A
Eliminate County Government	Francis W. McGrath	24	0.03	N/A
Eliminate County Government	Peter A. Busacca	14	0.02	N/A
Total votes		70,989	100.0	

New Jersey general election, 1993
Party	Candidate	Votes	%	±%
Democratic	Anthony Impreveduto	28,423	30.8	▲1.8
Democratic	Joan M. Quigley	27,562	29.9	▲2.4
Republican	Todd Hennessey	17,603	19.1	▼1.1
Republican	Manuel E. Fernandez	16,855	18.3	▼1.3
Politicians Are Crooks	Edith M. Shaw	1,114	1.2	▼0.7
Concerned Taxpayer's Coalition	William R. Dusenberry	587	0.6	N/A
Total votes		92,144	100.0	

1991 New Jersey general election
Party	Candidate	Votes	%
Democratic	Anthony Impreveduto	20,911	29.0
Democratic	David Kronick	19,764	27.5
Republican	Robert MacMillan	14,536	20.2
Republican	Gaston Delgado	14,145	19.6
Politicians Are Crooks	Edith M. Shaw	1,360	1.9
Politicians Are Crooks	Vivian L. Shaw	1,278	1.8
Total votes		71,994	100.0

1989 New Jersey general election
Party	Candidate	Votes	%	±%
Democratic	Anthony Impreveduto	30,047	35.6	▲3.4
Democratic	David C. Kronick	28,494	33.7	▲3.8
Republican	Guy Catrillo	12,418	14.7	▼5.3
Republican	Octavio J. Alfonso	11,975	14.2	▼2.7
Car Insurance Stinks	Herbert H. Shaw	1,541	1.8	▲1.3
Total votes		84,475	100.0	

1987 New Jersey general election
Party	Candidate	Votes	%	±%
Democratic	Anthony Impreveduto	25,291	32.2	▲9.5
Democratic	David C. Kronick	23,500	29.9	▲8.4
Republican	Frank J. Gargiulo	15,708	20.0	▼7.1
Republican	Lee S. Lichtenberger	13,310	16.9	▼9.8
Politicians Are Crooks	Peter Galbo	421	0.5	▼0.5
Politicians Are Crooks	Cathy Borer	377	0.5	▼0.4
Total votes		78,607	100.0	

1985 New Jersey general election
Party	Candidate	Votes	%	±%
Republican	Frank J. Gargiulo	25,179	27.1	▲10.4
Republican	Charles J. Catrillo	24,798	26.7	▲10.4
Democratic	Paul Cuprowski	21,018	22.7	▼9.4
Democratic	Anthony P. Vainieri	19,977	21.5	▼10.0
Politicians Are Crooks	Edith M. Shaw	896	1.0	▼0.8
Politicians Are Crooks	Herbert H. Shaw	877	0.9	▼0.7
Total votes		92,745	100.0	

New Jersey general election, 1983
Party	Candidate	Votes	%	±%
Democratic	Paul Cuprowski	23,173	32.1	▲0.3
Democratic	Anthony P. Vainieri	22,736	31.5	▼0.3
Republican	Louis Pandolfi	12,044	16.7	▼0.4
Republican	Nicholas F. Zaccario	11,769	16.3	▼0.5
Politicians Are Crooks	Joseph P. Zemanek	1,282	1.8	▲0.5
Politicians Are Crooks	William E. Koehler	1,124	1.6	▲0.5
Total votes		72,128	100.0	

New Jersey general election, 1981
Party	Candidate	Votes	%
Democratic	Robert C. Janiszewski	32,232	31.8
Democratic	Thomas Cowan	32,156	31.8
Republican	John Errico	17,355	17.1
Republican	Mary Ann Knabner	16,957	16.8
Politicians Are Crooks	Vivian L. Shaw	1,346	1.3
Politicians Are Crooks	William E. Koehler	1,155	1.1
Total votes		101,201	100.0

New Jersey general election, 1979
Party	Candidate	Votes	%	±%
Democratic	Robert C. Janiszewski	19,113	36.7	▲2.7
Democratic	Thomas F. Cowan, Sr.	18,503	35.5	▲1.3
Republican	Vincent Saporito	5,782	11.1	▼3.0
Republican	Frank J. Cimo	5,399	10.4	▼4.4
Politicians Are Crooks	Herbert H. Shaw	1,460	2.8	▲1.2
Action Talks	Kenneth Famularo	1,139	2.2	N/A
Honesty-Integrity-Determination	Anthony C. Carbone	721	1.4	N/A
Total votes		52,117	100.0	

New Jersey general election, 1977
Party	Candidate	Votes	%	±%
Democratic	Thomas F. Cowan, Sr.	26,508	34.2	▲1.6
Democratic	Robert C. Janiszewski	26,332	34.0	▲4.0
Republican	Anthony D’Agostino	11,446	14.8	▲6.4
Republican	Vincent Saporito	10,900	14.1	▲6.2
Politicians Are Crooks	Herbert H. Shaw	1,248	1.6	N/A
Politicians Are Crooks	Anita R. Frisco	1,020	1.3	N/A
Total votes		77,454	100.0	

New Jersey general election, 1975
Party	Candidate	Votes	%	±%
Democratic	Michael P. Esposito	26,291	32.6	▼5.3
Democratic	Alina Miszkiewicz	24,173	30.0	▼7.8
Independent Responsive Government	Michael J. Marino	9,333	11.6	▼26.2
Independent Responsive Government	John W. Dietzel	7,657	9.5	N/A
Republican	Anthony D’Agostino	6,802	8.4	▼2.4
Republican	Edward T. La Tour	6,371	7.9	▼2.4
Total votes		80,627	100.0	

New Jersey general election, 1973
Party	Candidate	Votes	%
Democratic	Michael P. Esposito	35,432	37.9
Democratic	Michael J. Marino	35,275	37.8
Republican	Mary Ann R. Knabner	10,050	10.8
Republican	Robert M. Ikola	9,578	10.3
Abolish County Government	Mary Ann Musella	1,195	1.3
Abolish County Government	Harry DeRisi	1,015	1.1
Politicians Are Crooks	Herbert H. Shaw	832	0.9
Total votes		93,377	100.0
