= Joan M. Quigley =

American politician

Member of the New Jersey General Assembly from the 32nd Legislative District
- In office January 11, 1994 – January 10, 2012 Serving with Anthony Impreveduto and Vincent Prieto
- Preceded by: David C. Kronick
- Succeeded by: Angelica M. Jimenez

Personal details
- Born: December 8, 1935 (age 90)
- Party: Democratic

Joan M. Quigley (born December 6, 1934) is an American Democratic Party politician who served in the New Jersey General Assembly from 1994 to 2012, representing the 32nd Legislative District. Quigley served as the Majority Conference Leader starting with the 2006–2008 legislative session. She was the Assembly's Deputy Speaker from 2004 to 2006 and was the Minority Parliamentarian from 1999 to 2001. She writes for The Jersey Journal.

== Career ==
Quigley served in the Assembly on the State Government Committee (as chair), the Budget Committee, the Health and Senior Services Committee and the Legislative Services Commission.

Quigley sponsored legislation mandating registration of sex offenders and requiring filing of DNA types with state and national databases, and also sponsored legislation setting a statute of limitations on parking tickets.

Quigley is a hospital administrator for the Bon Secours New Jersey Health System (former Franciscan Health System). She was previously employed as public information officer for the Hudson County Welfare Board and as executive director of a retired senior volunteer program of the Hudson County United Way.

She received an A.A. from Hudson County Community College in Public Policy, a B.A. in 1977 from Saint Peter's College, New Jersey in Urban Studies/Sociology, and was awarded an M.P.A. in 1979 from Rutgers University in Public Administration.

In the wake of the 2011 apportionment based on the results of the 2010 United States census, the section of Jersey City in which Quigley resided was removed from the 32nd District. Based on that change, she decided not to seek re-election to a seventh term of office in the Assembly in November 2011 and was replaced on the general election ballot by Angelica M. Jimenez, a vice president of the board of education in West New York. Jimenez won the election and succeeded Quigley in the Assembly in January 2012.

== Criticism of Ann Coulter ==
On June 8, 2006, Quigley and Assemblywoman Linda Stender publicly criticized Ann Coulter's book Godless: The Church of Liberalism. Stender and Quigley issued a press release in response to Coulter's criticism of the Jersey Girls, four widows of the September 11, 2001 attacks from New Jersey who had criticized U.S. policies in the events leading up to September 11. The press release called on New Jersey retailers to "express their outrage by refusing to carry or sell copies of Coulter's book."
