= Francis Rogers =

Francis Rogers may refer to:

- Francis Rogers (cricketer) (1897–1967), English cricketer
- Francis Rogers (barrister) (1791–1851), English judge and legal writer
- Francis Rogers (politician) (1868–1925), English Liberal politician

== See also ==
- Frank Rogers (disambiguation)
