= David C. Kronick =

American politician (1932–2026)

Member of the New Jersey General Assembly from the 32nd district
- In office January 12, 1988 – January 11, 1994 Serving with Anthony Impreveduto
- Preceded by: Charles J. Catrillo; Frank J. Gargiulo
- Succeeded by: Joan M. Quigley

Personal details
- Born: September 4, 1932 New York City, U.S.
- Died: September 15, 2026 (aged 94)
- Party: Democratic

David C. Kronick (September 4, 1932 – September 15, 2026) was an American Democratic Party politician who served in the New Jersey General Assembly from the 32nd Legislative District from 1988 to 1994.

Kronick died on September 15, 2026, at the age of 94.
