= Anthony Impreveduto =

American politician (1948–2009)

Member of the New Jersey General Assembly from the 32nd Legislative District
- In office January 12, 1988 – November 18, 2004 Serving with David C. Kronick and Joan M. Quigley
- Preceded by: Frank J. Gargiulo; Charles J. Catrillo
- Succeeded by: Vincent Prieto

Personal details
- Born: April 11, 1948 Jersey City, New Jersey, U.S.
- Died: August 6, 2009 (aged 61) Hackensack, New Jersey, U.S.
- Party: Democratic

Anthony Neil Impreveduto (April 11, 1948 – August 6, 2009) was an American educator and Democratic Party politician who served in the New Jersey General Assembly from 1988 until 2004, when he resigned following a guilty plea to corruption charges that involved use of campaign funds for personal purposes.

== Early life ==
Impreveduto was born on April 11, 1948, in Jersey City, New Jersey. He grew up in Hoboken, New Jersey and attended Weehawken High School. Impreveduto attended Seton Hall University, where he earned a master's degree in education administration and taught in his hometown at Secaucus High School.

== Career ==
His first elected position was in 1981 to the Secaucus, New Jersey Town Council. He served in that position until 1992, when he lost the council race to reform candidate Dennis Elwell.

He was elected to represent the 32nd legislative District in the New Jersey General Assembly in 1987, and served there on the Assembly Regulated Professions and Independent Authorities Committee as well as on the Ethics Committee. In the Assembly, he pushed for legislation to require registration of home contractors and inspectors with the New Jersey Division of Consumer Affairs and to forbid expiration dates on gift cards sold in the state.

In 2004, Impreveduto pled guilty to charges that he had diverted campaign contributions for personal uses, such as paying income taxes, travel for members of his family and other personal expenses in addition to buying sports memorabilia and paying for his daughter's wedding. Under a plea deal with New Jersey Attorney General Peter C. Harvey, Impreveduto did not serve any jail time. New Jersey Superior Court Judge Maria Sypek sentenced Impreveduto to five years of probation and a fine of $10,000, saying that his crimes "undermine the public trust" and her hope that the sentence would deter others from taking advantage of campaign funds. In addition to losing his Assembly seat, Impreveduto was forbidden from serving in a public office and was required to disburse the remaining money in his campaign fund, nearly $200,000, to two charitable organizations. Vincent Prieto, a building code official from Secaucus, was selected by Hudson County Democratic Party leaders to fill Impreveduto's vacant seat in the Assembly.

He later served on the faculty of William Paterson University, where his courses included political science.

== Death ==
He had received a bone marrow transplant in early 2009 after being diagnosed with lymphoma. Impreveduto died at age 61 on August 6, 2009, at Hackensack University Medical Center due to lymphoma. He was survived by his wife, as well as two daughters and a son. He had married the former Susan Zaluski in 1971 and had three children, Loren Ann (born in 1975), Jamie Lee (1979) and Anthony Joseph (1990).
