= Charles J. Catrillo =

American politician (1945–2004)

Member of the New Jersey General Assembly from the 32nd district
- In office January 14, 1986 – January 12, 1988 Serving with Frank J. Gargiulo
- Preceded by: Paul Cuprowski; Anthony P. Vainieri
- Succeeded by: Anthony Impreveduto; David C. Kronick

Personal details
- Born: August 13, 1945 Jersey City, New Jersey
- Died: February 19, 2004 (aged 58) Jersey City, New Jersey
- Party: Republican

Charles J. Catrillo (August 13, 1945 – February 19, 2004) was an American Republican Party politician who served in the New Jersey General Assembly from the 32nd Legislative District from 1986 to 1988.

Born in Jersey City on August 13th, 1945, Catrillo graduated from St. Peter's Preparatory School, and went on to receive degrees from Seton Hall University and Seton Hall University School of Law.

Charles Catrillo was born to Lillian Statile and Carmine Catrillo in Jersey City right before World War II ended. He was of full Italian descent, with his grandparents immigrating from the Campania and Basilicata regions in the early 1900s. Catrillo was a devout Catholic and was briefly married to Diane Plotkin from October 1973, until shortly after their daughter Elizabeth was born in 1977.

As the Assembly considered a bill that would allow the state to take over school districts, Catrillo argued that the Jersey City Public Schools, which he cited as a "patronage mill" that poorly serves handicapped students, should be among the first to be taken over.

He not only served in the state legislature but was also the director of water for Jersey City from 1982 until he died in 2004. He was also a judge on the Hudson County Superior Court after ten years as a lawyer and serving as an adjunct professor at Jersey City State College for nearly a decade. His sister, Maryann Hammer, was assistant superintendent of the Jersey City Public Schools for a decade after serving as principal of P.S. 28.

Catrillo died on February 19, 2004, at his home, at the age of 58. He left behind his sole daughter and a large Republican legacy in Hudson County, a known Democrat stronghold, particularly in winning the state assembly election as a member of the GOP.
