= Alina Miszkiewicz =

American politician (born 1940)

Member of the New Jersey General Assembly from the 32nd district
- In office January 13, 1976 – January 10, 1978
- Preceded by: Michael J. Marino
- Succeeded by: Thomas F. Cowan; Robert C. Janiszewski

Personal details
- Born: January 10, 1940 (age 86) Poland
- Party: Democratic

Alina Miszkiewicz (born January 10, 1940) is an American politician who served in the New Jersey General Assembly from the 32nd Legislative District from 1976 to 1978.
