= Pedro Mejia (politician) =

American politician (born 1970)

Member of the New Jersey Assembly from the 32nd Legislative District
- In office April 12, 2018 – January 9, 2024 Serving with Angelica M. Jimenez
- Preceded by: Vincent Prieto
- Succeeded by: Julio Marenco; Gabe Rodriguez

Personal details
- Born: June 23, 1970 (age 55)
- Party: Democratic
- Website: Legislative web page

Pedro Mejia (born June 23, 1970) is an American Democratic Party politician. A resident of Secaucus, he has represented the 32nd Legislative District in the New Jersey Assembly since 2018.

== Elective office ==
Mejia was sworn into office on April 12, 2018, succeeding Vincent Prieto, who left office to take a position with the New Jersey Sports and Exposition Authority. Mejia became the first Dominican-American to serve in the New Jersey Legislature. Mejia served on an interim basis until winning the special election to serve the remainder of Prieto's term in a special election on November 6, 2018, Mejia ran unopposed in the special election.

Preceded by Vincent Prieto	Member of the New Jersey General Assembly for the 32nd District; January 9, 2018–present With: Angelica M. Jimenez	Succeeded by Incumbent
