= Michael J. Marino =

American politician

Member of the New Jersey General Assembly from the 32nd Legislative District
- In office January 8, 1974 – January 13, 1976 Serving with Michael P. Esposito
- Preceded by: District created
- Succeeded by: Alina Miszkiewicz

Personal details
- Born: June 11, 1930 Jersey City, New Jersey
- Died: March 6, 2011 (aged 80)
- Party: Democratic

Michael J. Marino (June 11, 1930 – March 6, 2011) was an American politician who served in the New Jersey General Assembly from the 32nd Legislative District from 1974 to 1976.
