= Angelica M. Jimenez =

Member of the New Jersey General Assembly

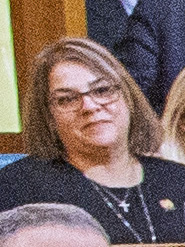

Member of the New Jersey General Assembly from the 32nd district
- In office January 10, 2012 – January 9, 2024 Serving with Pedro Mejia
- Preceded by: Joan M. Quigley
- Succeeded by: Julio Marenco; Gabe Rodriguez

Personal details
- Born: March 19, 1965 (age 60)
- Party: Democratic
- Occupation: Technologist
- Website: Legislative web page

Angelica M. Jimenez (born March 19, 1965) is an American Democratic Party politician, who has been serving in the General Assembly since 2012, where she represents the 32nd Legislative District. Jimenez has been the Deputy Speaker in the General Assembly since 2020.

She has served on the West New York Housing Corporation Board since 2010 and was Vice Chair of the West New York Housing Authority, from 2008 to 2010. Jimenez has served on the New Jersey Democratic State Committee since 2008 and was Vice President of the Board of Education of the West New York School District from 2009 until 2011. She is a state-certified radiology technician.

== Elective office ==
Jimenez was chosen to run for office in the General Assembly after Joan M. Quigley announced that she would not run for re-election in the face of redistricting.

=== Committees ===
Committee assignments for the current session are:

- Human Services, Chair
- Housing, Vice-chair
- Health

=== District 32 ===
Each of the 40 districts in the New Jersey Legislature has one representative in the New Jersey Senate and two members in the New Jersey General Assembly.Each of the 40 districts in the New Jersey Legislature has one representative in the New Jersey Senate and two members in the New Jersey General Assembly. Representatives from the 32nd District for the 2022—2023 Legislative Session are:

- Senator Nicholas Sacco
- Assemblyman Pedro Mejia
- Assemblywoman Angelica M. Jimenez

New Jersey General Assembly
Preceded by Joan M. Quigley	Member of the New Jersey General Assembly for the 32nd District; January 10, 2012 – present With: Pedro Mejia	Succeeded by Incumbent
