= Nicholas Sacco =

American politician (born 1946)

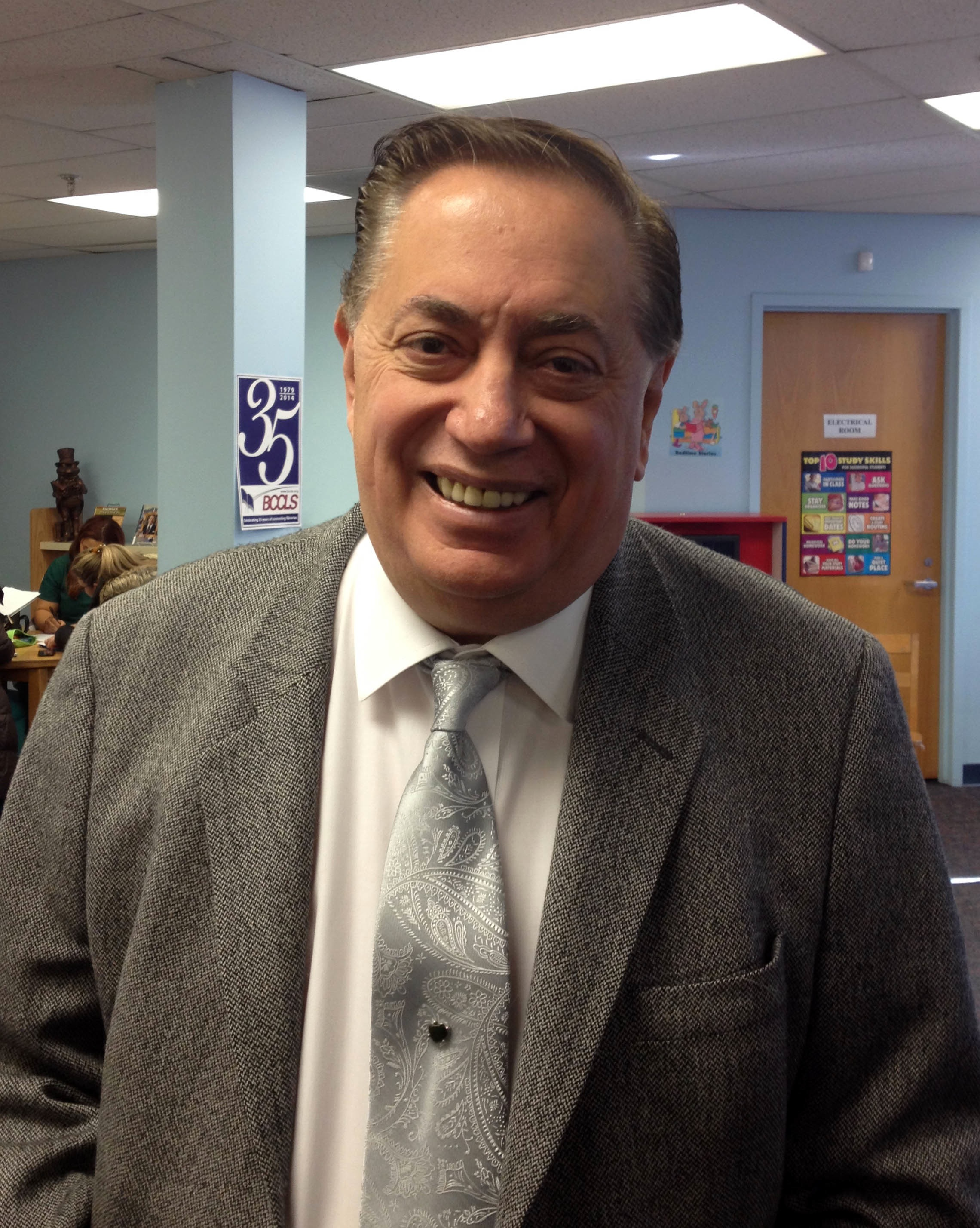
- Sacco in 2015

Member of the New Jersey Senate from the 32nd district
- In office January 11, 1994 – January 9, 2024
- Preceded by: Thomas F. Cowan
- Succeeded by: Raj Mukherji

Former Mayor of North Bergen
- In office January 1, 1991 – October 28, 2026
- Preceded by: Leo Gattoni
- Succeeded by: Hugo Cabrera

Personal details
- Born: November 17, 1946 (age 79) Jersey City, New Jersey, U.S.
- Party: Democratic
- Spouse: Kathryn Somick (m. 2022)
- Children: 1
- Education: Rutgers University (BA); Seton Hall University (MA)
- Website: State Senate website

Nicholas J. Sacco (born November 17, 1946) is an American Democratic Party politician who served in the New Jersey State Senate from 1994 to 2024, where he represented the 32nd Legislative District. Sacco served as the chairman of the Senate Transportation Committee and was also a member of the Law and Public Safety and Veterans' Affairs Committee. He served as mayor of North Bergen from 1991 until his resignation on October 28, 2026, and was allowed to hold two offices under a grandfather clause in a bill that took effect in February 2008 that prohibits dual office holding. Sacco announced on February 24, 2022, that he would not seek re-election to the State Senate. On October 8, 2026 he announced he was stepping down as mayor.

== Early life ==
Sacco was born in Jersey City on November 17, 1946. He grew up in West New York, graduating from Memorial High School. Sacco received a B.A. in 1968 in History from Rutgers University and an M.A. in Administration and Supervision from Seton Hall University in 1973.

== Political career ==
Sacco was first elected to the North Bergen Board of Commissioners in 1985 as a part of recall elections headed up by Leo Gattoni to clean out corrupt officials in the Township. In 1991, Gattoni retired from the Mayor's office and decided to endorse Sacco as mayor (in North Bergen, the mayor is chosen among members of the Board of Commissioners). Sacco has been reelected every four years, most recently in May 2019. Two years after becoming mayor, Sacco defeated incumbent state senator Thomas F. Cowan in the Democratic primary election for the 32nd district. He has also been overwhelmingly re-elected to this office since his first election.

In addition to serving as a state senator and mayor of North Bergen, Sacco served as the Director of Primary Education for the North Bergen School District until his retirement in 2017. Sacco has been Principal of Horace Mann and Lincoln School in North Bergen, and former president and vice president of the North Bergen Council of Administrators and Supervisors which is affiliated with the New Jersey Education Association. He simultaneously holds a seat in the New Jersey Senate and as Mayor. This dual position, often called double dipping, is allowed under a grandfather clause in the state law enacted by the New Jersey Legislature and signed into law by Governor of New Jersey Jon Corzine in September 2007 that prevents dual-office-holding but allows those who had held both positions as of February 1, 2008, to retain both posts.

Sacco is a sponsor of the state's Urban Enterprise Zone legislation, which has helped foster private business investment in urban centers and generates millions of dollars in revenue for North Bergen and other cities. Sacco has also sponsored legislation expanding the use of DNA testing in criminal cases, by having DNA collected from individuals convicted of disorderly conduct offenses that could be compared against databases to help close unsolved crime cases. In 2021 Sacco voted in favor of legislation establishing a constitutional right to reproductive freedom.

In 2012 the Hudson Reporter named him #1 in its list of Hudson County's 50 most influential people. In 2013 and 2014, he was ranked #3 (the first of which tied him with Senate colleague and Union City mayor Brian P. Stack), and #4 in 2015.

On February 24, 2022, Sacco announced that he would not run for re-election as state senator in 2023, after North Bergen was redistricted to the 33rd Legislative District, which placed Sacco in the same district as his colleague, Union City mayor and state senator Brian Stack, whom Sacco said he would support. In May 2023 Sacco ran for his 9th term as mayor, and he and his entire slate won.

In the 2025 New Jersey gubernatorial election, Sacco endorsed Republican Jack Ciattarelli over Mikie Sherrill. In response, Stack endorsed Sherill, reiterating his support after supporting her in the primary.

In July 2026, Assemblyman Larry Wainstein wrote a letter to the editor criticizing Sacco's leadership.

On October 8, 2026 Sacco announced he was stepping down as mayor effective October 28th, citing "health challenges." Sacco stated he supports commissioner Hugo Cabrera to replace him. Cabrera stated he supports Sacco's son, Nick Jr. to replace his father on the board of commissioners.

=== Committees ===
Committee assignments for the current session are:

- Law and Public Safety, vice-chair
- Transportation

=== District 32 ===
Each of the 40 districts in the New Jersey Legislature has one representative in the New Jersey Senate and two members in the New Jersey General Assembly. Representatives from the 32nd District for the 2022—2023 Legislative Session are:

- Senator Nicholas Sacco
- Assemblyman Pedro Mejia
- Assemblywoman Angelica M. Jimenez

=== Election history ===
New Jersey State Senate elections, 2013
Party	Candidate	Votes	%
Democratic	Nicholas J. Sacco (incumbent)	20,098	70.2
Republican	Paul Castelli	8,542	29.8
Democratic hold			

New Jersey State Senate elections, 2011
Party	Candidate	Votes	%
Democratic	Nicholas J. Sacco (incumbent)	16,413	83.2
Republican	Edward T. O’Neill	3,312	16.8
Democratic hold			

New Jersey State Senate elections, 2007
Party	Candidate	Votes	%
Democratic	Nicholas Sacco	16,780	82.8
Republican	John Pluchino	3,474	17.2
Democratic hold			

== Personal life ==
On November 26, 2022, Sacco married his longtime girlfriend Kathryn Somick at a ceremony at the Venetian in Garfield, New Jersey. His brother Joseph served as best man and his grandson, Nathan, was the ring bearer. Somick comes from a family with several members that work in the education system, and she herself worked with Sacco at the Board of Education.
