= The Intergalactic Kitchen =

- 2001 cover
- Author: Frank Rodgers
- Illustrator: Frank Rodgers
- Cover artist: Frank Rodgers
- Language: English
- Genre: Science Fiction, Children's
- Published: 1990 (Viking / Penguin)
- Publication place: United Kingdom
- Media type: Print
- Pages: 80
- ISBN: 0-670-82810-6
- OCLC: 59695698
- Followed by: The Intergalactic Kitchen Goes Prehistoric

The Intergalactic Kitchen is a 1990 book by Frank Rodgers. The book was released in 1990, which would soon lead to the sequel. The book, part of the Sci-Fi genre, is centered on a kitchen which can travel in space. The Intergalactic Kitchen was published in the UK by Viking Penguin.

== Introduction ==
The introduction page of the Bird Children

Before the story starts, Frank Rodgers introduces the reader to the Bird family. The page starts:

The Bird family live in the grounds of BONC – the National Bureau of Clever Experts, where some very odd experiments go on.

== Plot ==
=== Starting ===
The story starts with Mr Bird installing a protection system for the house. Mrs Bird presses the emergency button and the kitchen goes into orbit.

=== Intergalactic Events ===
When in orbit many events happen. These include:

- An Intergalactic Traffic Warden,
- A Gossiping Alien,
- Gas and Electric Readers
- A Salesman
- A Bulldozer!

== Television series ==
The book was made into a TV series that run in 2004. It was shown on BBC One. The show is about the Bird children (Robin, Snoo and Jay), their mother and Fleur, a rival from Snoo and Jay's school. They are about to go camping, when Mrs. Bird accidentally activates a force field, and are shot off into outer space. They attempt to try to get back to earth, when a family of four aliens arrive in the Kitchen. Then everything goes wrong, when Mrs. Bird accidentally climbs into the alien's spaceship, and Mr. and Mrs. Krryptyx accidentally activate the engines, thus separating Mrs. Bird's children and Mr. and Mrs. Krryptyx's children. This has, both the kids and the adults, on a series of mad adventures.
