= Herbert H. Shaw =

American politician and perennial candidate

Herbert H. Shaw (February 16, 1930–c. January 2016) was an American maintenance worker, political gadfly, anti-corruption activist, and prominent perennial candidate from Hudson County, New Jersey who ran for elected office more than 75 times over five decades under the "Politicians Are Crooks" banner.

== Political campaigns ==
Shaw was a native of Weehawken. He claimed that his interest in politics began during the 1960s with his opposition to U.S. involvement in Vietnam and his frustration in trying to get a position as an electrical inspector in neighboring North Bergen. According to Shaw, he passed a civil service exam but lost the job to a politically connected man who failed the test. As a result, he launched a career challenging the Hudson County Democratic Party machine from the late 1960s until his death in 2016 on the "Politicians Are Crooks" ticket. Although he ran on an independent ticket, he was a registered Republican as of 2011.

Shaw entered his name as a candidate for federal, state, county, and local offices more than 75 times. In 1995, Shaw told The New York Times that he welcomed the label "gadfly," because it meant he was "a pest of the high and mighty who are easily pestered because they are doing wrong." In most elections, Shaw did not actively campaign, did not hold events, and did not speak to the press. Although he never submitted his name for office with an intent to serve, Shaw told an interviewer in 2011 that his goal was to raise awareness about corruption in the Democratic machine that ran Hudson County. "My motive is revenge," Shaw told the reporter.

During his campaigns, his daughters Edith and Vivian often served as his running mates, always unsuccessfully.

=== Campaigns by year ===
In 1974, Shaw challenged U.S. representative Henry Helstoski. Helstoski was indicted on federal bribery charges the next year.

In 1978, Shaw ran for U.S. Senate against Bill Bradley and Jeff Bell. He received 4,736 votes, leading all of the nine independent and minor-party candidates.

In 1986, Shaw ran against U.S. representative Frank J. Guarini.

In 2007, Shaw received his highest share of the vote yet, about 5 percent for county executive.

In 2010, Shaw ran for Hudson County Sheriff against incumbent Juan M. Perez. He received about 2.8 percent of the vote.

In 2011, Shaw campaigned against Nicholas Sacco to raise awareness about the practice of "double-dipping," whereby New Jersey state officials could also serve in local or county office. The practice was banned in 2007, but existing offenders were allowed to continue serving. Sacco simultaneously served as state senator, mayor of North Bergen, and superintendent of the township's public schools. "To me, that's a conflict," said Shaw. "This is how strong Democratic Hudson County politics are." Sacco told a reporter, "When people want to protest me, they vote for Herb Shaw. ... It's healthy to a democracy to have Herb Shaws out there. For example, when you do the Pledge of Allegiance at a meeting, when you get to 'and justice for all,' he yells out, 'Sometimes!' That's just Herb."

Shaw ran against six Congressmen: Henry Helstoski, Harold Hollenbeck, Frank Guarini, Robert Torricelli, Bob Menendez, and Albio Sires.

== Personal life and death ==
As of 1995, Shaw worked as a maintenance worker for the Newark Public Library.

As of 2011, Shaw lived in a three-story home in North Bergen with his wife, Anne, three daughters, including Edith and Vivian, two grandsons, and two pet Rat Terriers.

In 2012, Shaw attended a public meeting of the North Bergen Board of Commissioners to complain that police had not located a bathtub stolen from his backyard. He said the backyard was "packed with junk, including a rusty school bus, old tires, several cars, an unused van, tables, and a variety of other items."

Shaw died around January 2016.
