= Frank E. Rodgers =

American politician (1909–2000)

Member of the New Jersey Senate from the 32nd district
- In office January 12, 1982 – January 10, 1984
- Preceded by: James Anthony Galdieri
- Succeeded by: Thomas F. Cowan

Member of the New Jersey Senate from the 30th district
- In office January 10, 1978 – January 12, 1982
- Preceded by: Anthony Imperiale
- Succeeded by: Carmen A. Orechio

Mayor of Harrison, New Jersey
- In office September 4, 1946 – August 22, 1995
- Preceded by: Frederick J. Gassert
- Succeeded by: Raymond J. McDonough

Personal details
- Born: Francis E. Rodgers; November 15, 1909
- Died: February 8, 2000 (aged 90)
- Resting place: Holy Cross Cemetery (North Arlington, New Jersey)
- Party: Democratic
- Parent(s): Michael Rodgers; Johanna Davin

Francis E. Rodgers (November 15, 1909 – February 8, 2000) was an American Democratic Party politician who was among the longest-serving mayors in U.S. history, first elected in 1946 as Mayor of Harrison, New Jersey. He served in the position for 48 years from 1946 to 1995, having been elected to 24 consecutive two-year terms in office. On May 30, 1987, Rodgers earned a place in the Guinness Book of World Records when he surpassed Mayor Erastus Corning II of Albany, New York, who died in office in 1983 after having served 40 years, 4 months and 28 days in office. The town marked the occasion by closing municipal offices in the mayor's honor and by letting students in the Harrison Public Schools have a day off. However, Mayor Hilmar Moore of Richmond, Texas, served a much longer span of 63 years in office until he died in 2012.

== Biography ==
He was born in Harrison on November 15, 1909, to Michael Rodgers and Johanna Davin, and attended St. Benedict's Preparatory School in Newark. Rodgers ran for the Harrison Town Council for the first time in 1935, and served there for ten years, including a term when he was re-elected to the office while serving 27 months in the United States Army during World War II in the Counterintelligence Corps.

Rodgers defeated incumbent Frederick J. Gassert in his first bid for the mayoralty, a candidate backed by Jersey City Mayor Frank Hague's Hudson County Democratic Party machine. Over his years in office, Rodgers had served as Town Clerk, as County Clerk, as a member of the Hudson County Board of Chosen Freeholders and as the Board's clerk. He served two terms in the New Jersey Senate, from 1978 to 1984, defeating Independent incumbent Anthony Imperiale.

Rodgers served on numerous state authorities and commissions, including being appointed secretary of the New Jersey Racing Commission by Governor Richard J. Hughes in 1963, to the New Jersey Highway Authority in 1976 by Governor Brendan Byrne, and to the New Jersey Turnpike Authority by Republican Governor Thomas Kean in 1984.

Rodgers won his final election campaign in November 1992 by a narrow 111 vote margin out of 3,600 votes cast, in this heavily-Democratic community, having been unable to campaign due to a chronic knee injury. Rodgers cited the injury and his desire to allow a younger generation to serve in office as his justification for declining to run for a 25th term in office. He was succeeded by Raymond J. McDonough. He maintained his position as chairman of the Harrison Democratic Committee after leaving office in 1995.

Rodgers was inducted into the Mayors' Hall of Fame in 1995 by the New Jersey State League of Municipalities, having been the prime proponent for the creation of the hall during his tenure with the organization.

Rodgers died on February 8, 2000, and was buried at Holy Cross Cemetery in North Arlington, New Jersey.

Political offices
Preceded by Frederick J. Gassert	Mayor of Harrison, New Jersey; September 4, 1946–August 22, 1995	Succeeded by Raymond J. McDonough
New Jersey Senate
Preceded by Anthony Imperiale	Member of the New Jersey Senate from the 30th district January 10, 1978–January 12, 1982	Succeeded by Carmen A. Orechio
Preceded by James Anthony Galdieri	Member of the New Jersey Senate from the 32nd district January 12, 1982–January 10, 1984	Succeeded by Thomas F. Cowan
