= Thomas F. Cowan =

American politician (1927–2010)

Thomas F. Cowan (April 17, 1927 – January 17, 2010) was an American Democratic party politician from Jersey City, New Jersey. Cowan served three terms each in the New Jersey General Assembly and the New Jersey Senate, representing the 32nd Legislative District.

Cowan served in the United States Army during World War II and the Korean War. After his service, he studied at Seton Hall University, graduating with a bachelor of arts degree. He worked for Local 825 of the International Union of Operating Engineers as a crane operator and worked his vocation for many years. Eventually, Tom went from laborer to a representative of the laborer becoming a business agent of Local 825 of the International Union of Operating Engineers.

Cowan's first run for political office was in 1973, when he lost an election for a seat on the Jersey City City Council. He was first elected in 1977 and served as Assemblyman for three terms from 1978 until 1984. He served in the State Senate from 1984 until 1994. Cowan was a delegate to the 1992 Democratic National Convention.

New Jersey General Assembly
| Preceded by Michael P. Esposito | Member of the New Jersey General Assembly from the 32nd district 1978–1984 | Succeeded by Paul Cuprowski |
New Jersey Senate
| Preceded by Frank E. Rodgers | Member of the New Jersey Senate from the 32nd district 1984–1994 | Succeeded by Nicholas Sacco |
