= Paul Cuprowski =

American politician (1940–2013)

Paul Cuprowski (October 25, 1940 – May 25, 2013) was an American Democratic Party politician who served in the New Jersey General Assembly, where he represented the 32nd Legislative District.

Born on October 25, 1940, in Jersey City, New Jersey, Cuprowski served in the United States Army during the Vietnam era. In 1973, he was elected to the Jersey City City Council and was the city council president. He served in the New Jersey General Assembly from 1983 to 1985. He worked in the Hudson County, New Jersey Division of Planning and Economic Development. He died on May 25, 2013, in Adairsville, Georgia.
