= 2013 New Jersey gubernatorial election =

- November 5, 2013
- Turnout: 39.6% (▼7.3%)
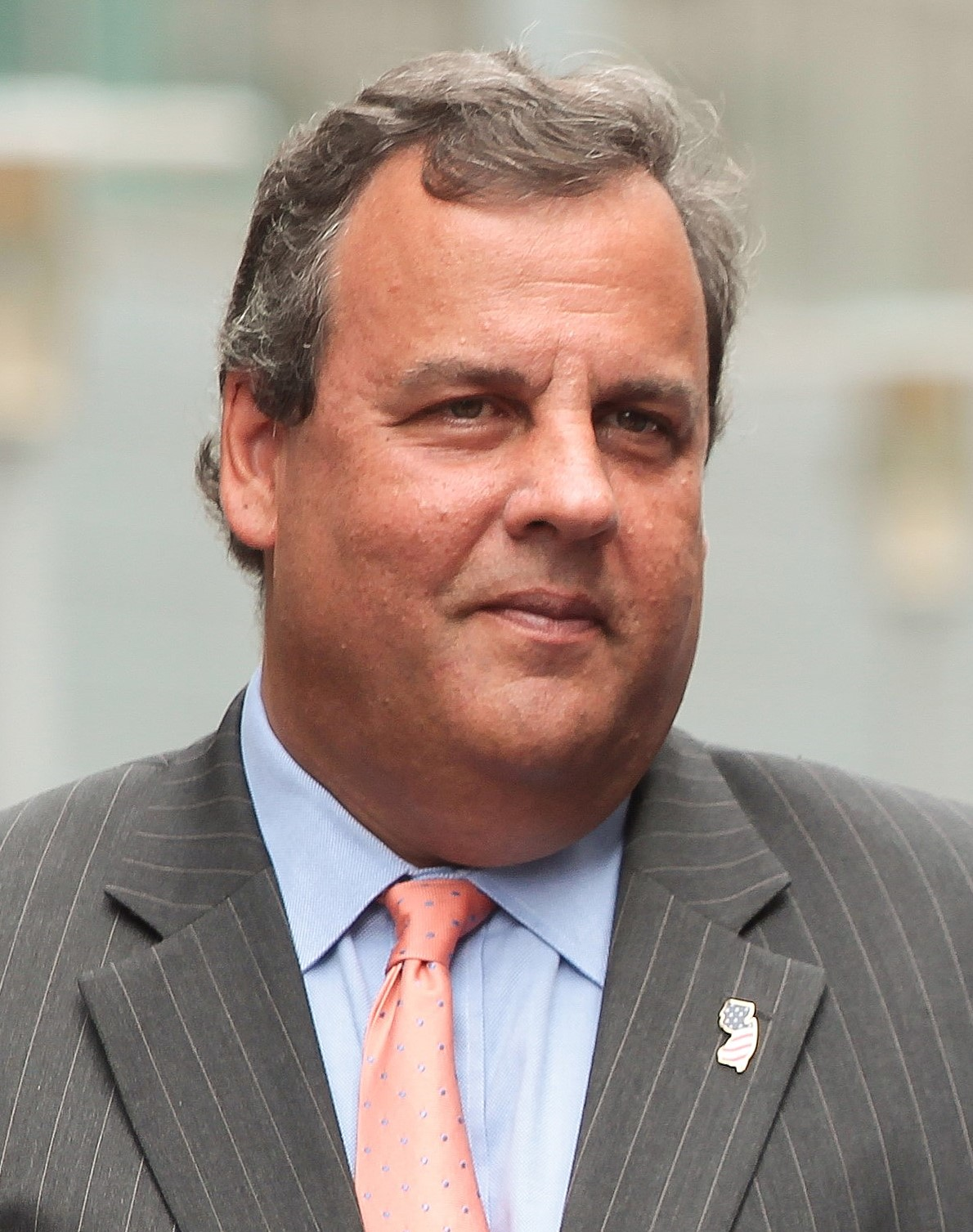

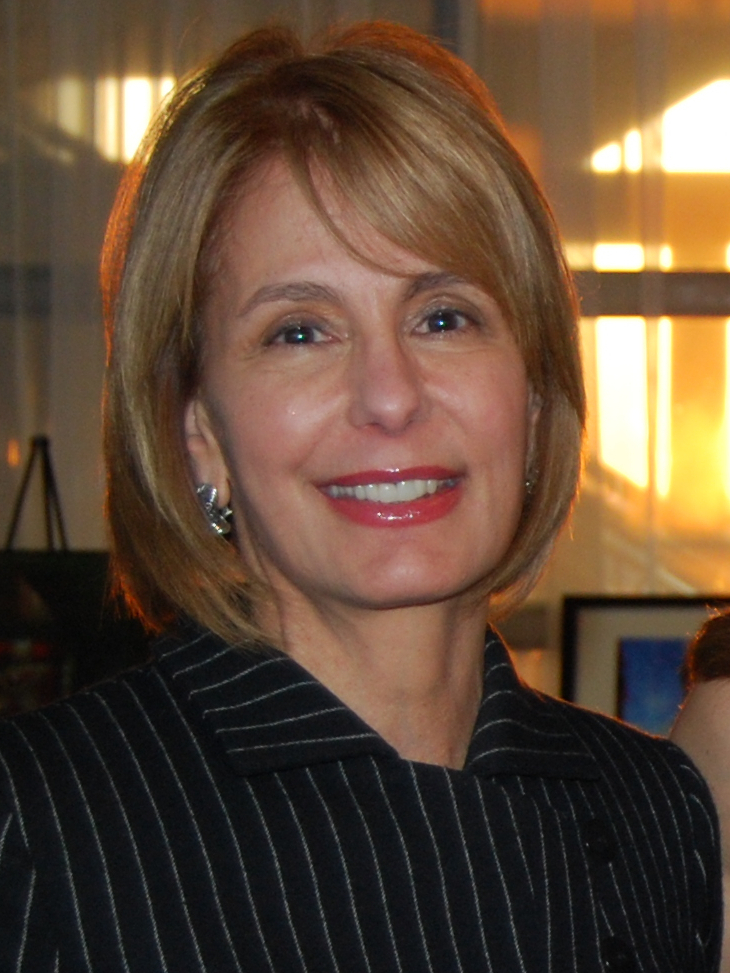
| Nominee | Chris Christie | Barbara Buono |
| Party | Republican | Democratic |
| Running mate | Kim Guadagno | Milly Silva |
| Popular vote | 1,278,932 | 809,978 |
| Percentage | 60.30% | 38.19% |
- Christie: 40–50% 50–60% 60–70% 70–80% 80–90% >90% Buono: 40–50% 50–60% 60–70% 70–80% 80–90%
Governor before election
Chris Christie
Republican
Elected Governor
Chris Christie
Republican

The 2013 New Jersey gubernatorial election took place on November 5, 2013, to elect the governor of New Jersey. Incumbent Republican Governor Chris Christie ran for election to a second term in office. He faced Democratic nominee Barbara Buono and six others in the general election.

Christie won re-election in a landslide, receiving over 60% of the vote and carrying 19 of the state's 21 counties, including six that he lost in 2009, with the only two counties voting for Buono being heavily Democratic Hudson and Essex. This is the only statewide election held in New Jersey since the 1988 presidential election in which a Republican earned a majority of the vote. (Note: New Jersey only holds statewide elections for Governor and United States Senator. All other state offices are appointed by the Governor. In 1993, 1997, and 2009, Republicans were elected Governor with pluralities. A Republican has not been elected to the United States Senate from New Jersey since 1972.) Christie became the first Republican gubernatorial candidate to win a majority of the vote since Thomas Kean's landslide victory in 1985.

Christie won 21% of Black voters, 51% of Latinos, and was sworn in for his second term on January 21, 2014. As of 2026, this is the last time Republicans won any statewide election in New Jersey. This is also the last time the counties of Bergen, Burlington, Camden, Middlesex, Mercer, and Union voted for the Republican candidate in a statewide election, as well as the last time that Somerset and Passaic did so in a gubernatorial election.

Christie was criticized for spending an additional $12–25 million of state money to hold a special election for United States senator for New Jersey 20 days earlier on October 16, instead of simply holding the special election on November 5, concurrent with the already scheduled gubernatorial election. The Democratic nominee for the U.S. Senate was Newark Mayor Cory Booker. Buono said it was hypocritical, speculating that Booker's presence on the ballot would attract more black and other minority voters who would be likely to vote for Buono.

This is the only gubernatorial election since 1989 in which anyone won over 60% of the vote, and Christie was the first Republican to do so since 1985. Cumberland, Camden, and Union counties voted Republican in a gubernatorial election for the first time since 1985, and Mercer & Passaic since 1993. Buono is the only Democratic nominee for governor since 1985 to never be elected governor and remains the last to receive under a million votes. Despite Christie’s landslide victory in this election, Democrats concurrently retained their majorities in both state legislative chambers.

== Republican primary ==
=== Candidates ===
==== Declared ====
- Chris Christie, incumbent governor
- Seth Grossman, former Atlantic City councilman

=== Results ===
Results by county Christie—80–90% Christie—>90%

2013 Republican primary — New Jersey gubernatorial election
| Party | Candidate | Votes | % |
|---|---|---|---|
| Republican | Chris Christie (incumbent) | 205,666 | 91.91% |
| Republican | Seth Grossman | 18,095 | 8.09% |
| Total votes | | 233,761 | 100.00% |

== Democratic primary ==
=== Candidates ===
==== Declared ====
- Barbara Buono, state senator and former state senate majority leader
- Troy Webster, aide to East Orange Mayor Robert Bowser

==== Removed from primary ballot ====
- William Araujo, former mayoral candidate in Edison
- Carl Bergmanson, former mayor of Glen Ridge and candidate for governor in 2009
- Jeff Boss, conspiracy theorist and perennial candidate

Araujo, Bergmanson, Boss, and Webster had their nominating petitions challenged by the New Jersey Democratic State Committee; only Webster's petitions were found to be valid, therefore allowing his name to remain on the primary ballot with Buono. Araujo and Boss subsequently filed new petitions to run in the general election as independents.

==== Declined ====
- Rob Andrews, U.S. representative
- Chris Bollwage, mayor of Elizabeth
- Cory Booker, mayor of Newark (ran for and won a U.S. Senate seat three weeks earlier on October 16)
- Richard Codey, state senator, former state senate president and former governor
- Joseph Cryan, former assembly majority leader
- Brendan Gill, Essex County freeholder
- Louis Greenwald, Assembly majority leader
- Lisa P. Jackson, former administrator of the United States Environmental Protection Agency
- Phil Murphy, U.S. ambassador to Germany, former Goldman Sachs executive, and future governor of New Jersey
- Sheila Oliver, speaker of the State Assembly
- Frank Pallone, U.S. representative
- Bill Pascrell, U.S. representative
- Stephen Sweeney, State Senate president
- John Wisniewski, chair of the New Jersey Democratic Party and state assemblyman

=== Polling ===
Hypothetical polling

| Poll source | Date(s) administered | Sample size | Margin of error | Cory Booker | Barbara Buono | Richard Codey | Louis Greenwald | Steve Sweeney | John Wisniewski | Other | Undecided |
|---|---|---|---|---|---|---|---|---|---|---|---|
| Quinnipiac | January 15–21, 2013 | 616 | ± 4% | — | 10% | 28% | — | 10% | — | 5% | 48% |
| Public Policy Polling | November 26–28, 2012 | 300 | ± 5.66% | 46% | 7% | 23% | — | 6% | — | 7% | 10% |
| Quinnipiac | November 19–25, 2012 | n/a | ± n/a% | 41% | 4% | 12% | 1% | — | 1% | 2% | 39% |

=== Results ===
Results by county Buono—>90% Buono—80–90% Buono—70–80%

2013 Democratic primary — New Jersey gubernatorial election
| Party | Candidate | Votes | % |
|---|---|---|---|
| Democratic | Barbara Buono | 173,714 | 88.10% |
| Democratic | Troy Webster | 23,457 | 11.90% |
| Total votes | | 195,171 | 100.00% |

== General election ==
=== Major party candidates ===
- Barbara Buono (Democratic), former majority leader of the New Jersey Senate

- Running mate: Milly Silva, New Jersey executive vice president for 1199 SEIU

- Chris Christie (Republican), incumbent governor

- Running mate: Kim Guadagno, incumbent lieutenant governor

=== Minor candidates ===
- William Araujo, Peace and Freedom
  - Running mate: Maria Salamanca
- Jeff Boss, NSA
  - Running mate: Robert B. Thorne
- Kenneth R. Kaplan, New Jersey Libertarian Party
  - Running mate: Brenda Bell
- Diane W. Sare, Glass-Steagall Now
  - Running mate: Bruce Todd
- Hank Schroeder, Independent
  - Running mate: Patricia Moschella
- Steve Welzer, Green Party of New Jersey
  - Running mate: Patricia Alessandrini

=== Endorsements ===
Chris Christie (R)

Organizations

- Eastcoast Korean Real Estate Association
- Essex County Association of Chiefs of Police
- Essex County Latino-American Chamber of Commerce
- Hispanic American Chamber of Commerce Foundation of Essex County
- Hudson County Taekwondo Association
- Korean American Chamber of Commerce of New Jersey
- Korean American Grocery Association
- Korean Marine Corps Veterans Association of New Jersey
- Korean Real Estate Association of NJ
- Laborers' International Union of North America (LIUNA)
- Lakewood Vaad
- Latino Leadership Alliance of New Jersey
- National Coalition of Latino Officers
- National Federation of Independent Business
- New Jersey Career Fire Chiefs' Association
- New Jersey Central Korean American Association
- New Jersey First Aid Council
- New Jersey Food Council
- New Jersey Korean American Beauty Salon Association
- New Jersey Korean American Dry Cleaning Association
- New Jersey Korean American Nail Association
- New Jersey Outdoor Alliance
- New Jersey Taekwondo Association
- Overseas Korean Traders Association of New Jersey
- Penel Concert Choir
- Port Authority Lieutenants Benevolent Association
- Port Authority of New York and New Jersey Police Benevolent Association
- Port Authority Police Detectives Endowment Association
- Port Authority Police Sergeants Benevolent Association
- Statewide Hispanic Chamber of Commerce
- Waterfront Commission Police Detectives Endowment Association

Elected officials

- Laurence M. Bennett, Democratic councilman of Harrison
- Michael Blunt, Democratic mayor of Chesilhurst
- David Borworth, Democratic council president of Palmyra
- Angelo Corradino, Democratic mayor of Manville
- Anthony Davis, Democratic council president of Paterson
- Joe DiVincenzo, Democratic county executive of Essex County
- James Dodd, Democratic mayor of Dover
- Michael Dolaghan, Democratic councilman of Harrison
- James Doran, Democratic councilman of Harrison
- Armando Fontoura, Democratic sheriff of Essex County
- Rodney P. Frelinghuysen, U.S. representative for New Jersey's 11th congressional district
- FiorD'Aliza Frias, Democratic commissioner of West New York
- Scott Garrett, U.S. representative for New Jersey's 5th congressional district
- Kevin Glover, Democratic mayor of Scotch Plains
- Jesus R. Huaranga, Democratic councilman of Harrison
- Elie Katz, Democratic councilman of Teaneck
- Leonard Lance, U.S. representative for New Jersey's 7th congressional district
- Frank LoBiondo, U.S. representative for New Jersey's 2nd congressional district
- Dina Long, Democratic mayor of Sea Bright
- Carol Mandaglio, Democratic councilwoman of Harrison
- Raymond J. McDonough, Democratic mayor of Harrison
- Anselmo Millan, Democratic councilman of Harrison
- Sandy Moscaritolo, Democratic mayor of River Edge
- Francisco Nascimento, Democratic councilman of Harrison
- Christine Noriega, Democratic alderwoman of Dover
- Michael Picciallo, Democratic alderman of Dover
- Marco Rubio, U.S. senator of Florida
- Jon Runyan, U.S. representative for New Jersey's 3rd congressional district
- Robert Rutan, Democratic alderman of Dover
- Karen Scheffler, Democratic mayor of Palmyra
- Mark Schwartz, Democratic councilman of Teaneck
- Chris Smith, U.S. representative for New Jersey's 4th congressional district
- Brian P. Stack, Democratic state senator and mayor of Union City
- Yitz Stern, Democratic councilman of Teaneck
- Victor Villalta, Democratic councilman of Harrison
- James Visioli, Democratic alderman of Dover
- Dwayne Warren, Democratic mayor of Orange
- Michelle Yzarnotegui, Democratic alderwoman of Dover

Newspapers

- Asbury Park Press
- The Bergen Record
- Herald News
- The Philadelphia Inquirer
- The Press of Atlantic City
- The Star Ledger

Religious groups

- Igud of Lakewood
- Korean Pastors Association

Religious leaders

- Reverend Julio Barriento
- Reverend Najiyyah Brooks
- Pastor Jeffrey Bryan
- Pastor Joe Carter
- Reverend Renato Castro
- Reverend Dr. Hector A. Chiesa
- Pastor Ron Christian
- Minister Tami Christian
- Pastor William Christian
- Reverend Alfred Fletcher
- Reverend Jesus Infante
- Bishop Reginald Jackson, executive director of the Black Ministers' Council
- Michele Levine, president, Bayonne Jewish Community Center
- Reverend Jose C. Lopez
- Reverend Rafael Mesa
- Reverend Raul Otero
- Reverend David Torres Oyola
- Bishop Parrott Sr.
- Pastor John Perry
- Reverend Tomas Reyes
- Reverend Miguel Rivera
- Bishop Dr. Thomas Robinson
- Reverend Bob Rodriguez
- Reverend David Rojas
- Pastor Jerry Smith
- Pastor Ralph Terrell
- Reverend Ariel Torres
- Pastor R. Trabout

Others

- David Letterman, talk-show host
- Shaquille O'Neal, former basketball player
- Buddy Valastro, star of Cake Boss
- Mark Zuckerberg, co-founder of Facebook
Barbara Buono (D)

Organizations

- 1199SEIU United Healthcare Workers East
- American Federation of State County and Municipal Employees
- American Federation of Teachers New Jersey
- Communications Workers of America (CWA)
- Council of New Jersey State College Locals
- Democracy for America (DFA)
- EMILY's List
- Garden State Equality
- Health Professionals and Allied Employees
- Latinas United for Political Empowerment PAC
- Latino Action Network
- New Jersey Education Association (NJEA)
- New Jersey Environmental Federation
- New Jersey Fraternal Order of Police (NJFOP)
- New Jersey State Council of Machinists
- New Jersey State Industrial Union Council
- NOW-NJ PAC
- Planned Parenthood Action Fund of New Jersey
- Retail, Wholesale and Department Store Union (RWDSU)
- Sierra Club
- Women's Campaign Fund
- Women's Political Caucus of New Jersey

Elected officials

- Nelson Albano, state assemblyman
- Rob Andrews, U.S. representative for New Jersey's 1st congressional district
- Ras Baraka, South Ward member of the Newark Municipal Council
- Jim Beach, state senator and co-chair of the Camden County Democratic Party
- Dan Benson, state assemblyman
- Cory Booker, mayor of Newark and U.S. senator-elect from New Jersey
- John Burzichelli, state assemblyman
- Richard Codey, state senator, former governor of New Jersey, and former president of the New Jersey Senate
- Herb Conaway, state assemblyman
- Mildred C. Crump, at-large member of the Newark Municipal Council
- Joe Cryan, state assemblyman and former majority leader of the New Jersey General Assembly
- Jim Florio, former governor of New Jersey
- Angel Fuentes, state assemblyman
- Brendan Gill, Essex County freeholder
- Nia Gill, president pro tempore of the New Jersey Senate
- Louis Greenwald, majority leader of the New Jersey General Assembly
- Maggie Hassan, governor of New Hampshire
- Jerramiah Healy, former mayor of Jersey City
- Rush Holt, U.S. representative for New Jersey's 12th congressional district
- Pamela Rosen Lampitt, state assemblywoman
- Fred H. Madden, state senator and chairman of the Gloucester County Democratic Party
- Robert Menendez, incumbent U.S. senator (D-NJ)
- Matthew Milam, former state assemblyman
- Frank Minor, mayor of Logan Township
- Paul D. Moriarty, state assemblyman
- Gabriela Mosquera, state assemblywoman
- Donald Norcross, state senator and co-chair of the Camden County Democratic Party
- Martin O'Malley, governor of Maryland
- Frank Pallone, U.S. representative for New Jersey's 6th congressional district
- Bill Pascrell, U.S. representative for New Jersey's 9th congressional district
- Donald Payne, Jr., U.S. representative for New Jersey's 10th congressional district
- Nick Poliseno, Republican mayor of Spotswood
- Ronald C. Rice, West Ward member of the Newark Municipal Council
- Celeste Riley, state assemblywoman
- Darrin Sharif, Central Ward member of the Newark Municipal Council
- Peter Shumlin, governor of Vermont and chair of the Democratic Governors Association
- Troy Singleton, state assemblyman
- Albio Sires, U.S. representative for New Jersey's 8th congressional district
- Stephen Sweeney, president of the New Jersey Senate
- Jeff Van Drew, state senator
- Jim Whelan, state senator
- Gilbert "Whip" Wilson, state assemblyman

Others

- Babs Casbar Siperstein, Democratic National Committee member from New Jersey and LGBT activist
- Kerry Washington, actress

=== Debates ===
- Complete video of debate, October 8, 2013 - C-SPAN
- Complete video of debate, October 15, 2013 - C-SPAN

=== Predictions ===
| Source | Ranking | As of |
|---|---|---|
| Rothenberg Political Report | Safe R | October 25, 2013 |
| Sabato | Safe R | October 24, 2013 |

=== Polling ===
View source data.

| Poll source | Date(s) administered | Sample size | Margin of error | Chris Christie (R) | Barbara Buono (D) | Other | Undecided |
|---|---|---|---|---|---|---|---|
| Quinnipiac | October 30–November 3, 2013 | 1,388 | ± 2.6% | 61% | 33% | 1% | 6% |
| Monmouth | October 30–November 2, 2013 | 1,436 | ± 2.6% | 57% | 37% | 2% | 4% |
| Rutgers-Eagleton | October 28–November 2, 2013 | 535 | ± 4.2% | 66% | 30% | — | 4% |
| Fairleigh Dickinson University | October 24–30, 2013 | 570 | ± 4.1% | 59% | 40% | 1% | — |
| Kean University | October 28, 2013 | ? | ± 3% | 54% | 36% | — | 10% |
| Stockton Polling Institute | October 23–28, 2013 | 804 | ± 3.5% | 56% | 32% | 4% | 8% |
| Quinnipiac | October 21–27, 2013 | 1,203 | ± 2.8% | 64% | 31% | 1% | 5% |
| Quinnipiac | October 10–14, 2013 | 1,938 | ± 2.2% | 62% | 33% | — | 5% |
| Rutgers-Eagleton | October 7–13, 2013 | 562 | ± 4.1% | 59% | 33% | — | 8% |
| Monmouth | October 10–12, 2013 | 1,606 | ± 2.5% | 59% | 35% | 2% | 4% |
| Stockton Polling Institute | October 3–8, 2013 | 800 | ± 3.5% | 61% | 28% | — | 11% |
| Rasmussen | October 7, 2013 | 1,000 | ± 3% | 55% | 34% | 4% | 7% |
| Quinnipiac | October 5–7, 2013 | 1,144 | ± 2.9% | 62% | 33% | 1% | 4% |
| Fairleigh Dickinson University | September 30–October 5, 2013 | 702 | ± 3.7% | 58% | 25% | 2% | 15% |
| Monmouth | September 26–29, 2013 | 615 | ± 4% | 56% | 37% | — | 7% |
| Quinnipiac | September 19–22, 2013 | 1,249 | ± 2.8% | 64% | 30% | 1% | 5% |
| Pulse Opinion Research | September 19, 2013 | 1,000 | ± ? | 52% | 34% | 6% | 8% |
| Stockton Polling Institute | September 15–21, 2013 | 812 | ± 3.4% | 58% | 30% | 1% | 10% |
| Rasmussen | September 10–11, 2013 | 999 | ± 3% | 58% | 32% | 2% | 8% |
| Rutgers-Eagleton | September 3–9, 2013 | 568 | ± 4.1% | 55% | 35% | 1% | 8% |
| Fairleigh Dickinson University | August 21–27, 2013 | 700 | ± 3.7% | 50% | 26% | 6% | 19% |
| Monmouth | August 15–18, 2013 | 777 | ± 3.5% | 56% | 36% | 3% | 6% |
| Quinnipiac | August 1–5, 2013 | 2,042 | ± 2.2% | 58% | 30% | 1% | 11% |
| Quinnipiac | July 2–7, 2013 | 1,068 | ± 3% | 61% | 29% | 1% | 9% |
| Pulse Opinion Research | June 18, 2013 | 1,000 | ± 3% | 58% | 28% | 6% | 8% |
| Fairleigh Dickinson University | June 10–16, 2013 | 705 | ± 3.7% | 57% | 27% | 2% | 13% |
| Rasmussen | June 12–13, 2013 | 1,000 | ± 3% | 58% | 28% | 4% | 10% |
| Stockton Polling Institute | June 8–13, 2013 | 741 | ± 3.6% | 64% | 25% | 2% | 10% |
| Monmouth | June 10–11, 2013 | 626 | ± 3.9% | 61% | 31% | 4% | 4% |
| Quinnipiac | June 7–9, 2013 | 858 | ± 3.4% | 59% | 29% | 1% | 10% |
| Rutgers-Eagleton | June 3–9, 2013 | 763 | ± 3.6% | 59% | 27% | 2% | 12% |
| NBC News/Marist | April 28–May 2, 2013 | 1,080 | ± 3% | 60% | 28% | 1% | 10% |
| Quinnipiac | April 19–22, 2013 | 1,112 | ± 2.9% | 58% | 26% | 1% | 14% |
| Rutgers-Eagleton | April 3–7, 2013 | 819 | ± 3.7% | 57% | 27% | — | 16% |
| Harper Polling | March 24–25, 2013 | 760 | ± 3.55% | 58% | 27% | — | 15% |
| Quinnipiac | March 19–24, 2013 | 1,129 | ± 2.9% | 60% | 25% | 1% | 14% |
| Fairleigh Dickinson University | March 4–10, 2013 | 702 | ± 3.7% | 58% | 22% | — | 20% |
| Quinnipiac | February 13–17, 2013 | 1,149 | ± 2.9% | 62% | 25% | 1% | 13% |
| Monmouth | February 6–10, 2013 | 803 | ± 3.5% | 62% | 20% | 6% | 12% |
| Rutgers-Eagleton | January 30–February 3, 2013 | 698 | ± 3.7% | 63% | 21% | — | 16% |
| Quinnipiac | January 15–21, 2013 | 1,647 | ± 2.4% | 63% | 22% | — | 14% |
| Pulse Opinion Research | January 6, 2013 | 1,000 | ± 3% | 55% | 22% | 5% | 18% |
| Fairleigh Dickinson University | January 2–6, 2013 | 700 | ± 3.7% | 64% | 21% | 1% | 14% |
| Public Policy Polling | November 26–28, 2012 | 600 | ± 4% | 60% | 20% | — | 21% |
| Quinnipiac | November 19–25, 2012 | 1,664 | ± 2.4% | 61% | 23% | 1% | 15% |
| Rutgers-Eagleton | November 14–17, 2012 | 1,097 | ± 2.9% | 60% | 22% | 2% | 15% |
| Quinnipiac | October 10–14, 2012 | 1,405 | ± 2.6% | 49% | 33% | — | 18% |

Hypothetical polling

with Booker

| Poll source | Date(s) administered | Sample size | Margin of error | Chris Christie (R) | Cory Booker (D) | Other | Undecided |
|---|---|---|---|---|---|---|---|
| Public Policy Polling | November 26–28, 2012 | 600 | ± 4% | 50% | 36% | — | 14% |
| Quinnipiac | November 19–25, 2012 | 1,664 | ± 2.4% | 53% | 35% | 1% | 11% |
| Rutgers-Eagleton | November 14–17, 2012 | 1,103 | ± 2.9% | 53% | 34% | 2% | 11% |
| Quinnipiac | October 10–14, 2012 | 1,405 | ± 2.6% | 46% | 42% | — | 12% |
| Quinnipiac | August 27–September 2, 2012 | 1,560 | ± 2.5% | 47% | 40% | — | 11% |
| Public Policy Polling | July 15–18, 2011 | 480 | ± 4.5% | 43% | 47% | — | 10% |
| Public Policy Polling | January 6–9, 2011 | 520 | ± 4.3% | 42% | 42% | — | 16% |

with Byrne

| Poll source | Date(s) administered | Sample size | Margin of error | Chris Christie (R) | Tom Byrne (D) | Other | Undecided |
|---|---|---|---|---|---|---|---|
| Rutgers-Eagleton | November 14–17, 2012 | 1,095 | ± 2.9% | 58% | 22% | 2% | 18% |

with Codey

| Poll source | Date(s) administered | Sample size | Margin of error | Chris Christie (R) | Richard Codey (D) | Other | Undecided |
|---|---|---|---|---|---|---|---|
| Quinnipiac | January 15–21, 2013 | 1,647 | ± 2.4% | 59% | 30% | — | 11% |
| Pulse Opinion Research | January 6, 2013 | 1,000 | ± 3% | 53% | 28% | 5% | 14% |
| Fairleigh Dickinson University | January 2–6, 2013 | 700 | ± 3.7% | 59% | 26% | 1% | 14% |
| Public Policy Polling | November 26–28, 2012 | 600 | ± 4% | 53% | 31% | — | 16% |
| Quinnipiac | November 19–25, 2012 | 1,664 | ± 2.4% | 57% | 30% | 1% | 12% |
| Rutgers-Eagleton | November 14–17, 2012 | 1,099 | ± 2.9% | 56% | 31% | 2% | 12% |
| Quinnipiac | October 10–14, 2012 | 1,405 | ± 2.6% | 47% | 41% | 1% | 11% |

with Greenwald

| Poll source | Date(s) administered | Sample size | Margin of error | Chris Christie (R) | Lou Greenwald (D) | Other | Undecided |
|---|---|---|---|---|---|---|---|
| Quinnipiac | November 19–25, 2012 | 1,664 | ± 2.4% | 62% | 20% | 1% | 15% |
| Rutgers-Eagleton | November 14–17, 2012 | 1,098 | ± 2.9% | 60% | 21% | 2% | 18% |
| Quinnipiac | October 10–14, 2012 | 1,405 | ± 2.6% | 50% | 31% | — | 18% |

with Pallone

| Poll source | Date(s) administered | Sample size | Margin of error | Chris Christie (R) | Frank Pallone (D) | Other | Undecided |
|---|---|---|---|---|---|---|---|
| Public Policy Polling | July 15–18, 2011 | 480 | ± 4.5% | 43% | 43% | — | 14% |

with Springsteen

| Poll source | Date(s) administered | Sample size | Margin of error | Chris Christie (R) | Bruce Springsteen (D) | Other | Undecided |
|---|---|---|---|---|---|---|---|
| Public Policy Polling | November 26–28, 2012 | 600 | ± 4% | 61% | 25% | — | 14% |
| Public Policy Polling | July 15–18, 2011 | 480 | ± 4.5% | 42% | 42% | — | 15% |

with Sweeney

| Poll source | Date(s) administered | Sample size | Margin of error | Chris Christie (R) | Stephen Sweeney (D) | Other | Undecided |
|---|---|---|---|---|---|---|---|
| Quinnipiac | January 15–21, 2013 | 1,647 | ± 2.4% | 61% | 25% | 1% | 13% |
| Pulse Opinion Research | January 6, 2013 | 1,000 | ± 3% | 58% | 19% | 7% | 16% |
| Fairleigh Dickinson University | January 2–6, 2013 | 700 | ± 3.7% | 65% | 19% | 1% | 15% |
| Public Policy Polling | November 26–28, 2012 | 600 | ± 4% | 57% | 20% | — | 23% |
| Public Policy Polling | July 15–18, 2011 | 480 | ± 4.5% | 42% | 40% | — | 18% |

with Wisniewski

| Poll source | Date(s) administered | Sample size | Margin of error | Chris Christie (R) | John Wisniewski (D) | Other | Undecided |
|---|---|---|---|---|---|---|---|
| Quinnipiac | November 19–25, 2012 | 1,664 | ± 2.4% | 62% | 21% | 1% | 15% |

== Results ==
2013 New Jersey gubernatorial election
| Party | Candidate | Votes | % | ±% |
|---|---|---|---|---|
| Republican | Chris Christie (incumbent) | 1,278,932 | 60.30% | +11.84 |
| Democratic | Barbara Buono | 809,978 | 38.19% | –6.69 |
| Libertarian | Kenneth R. Kaplan | 12,155 | 0.57% | +0.37 |
| Green | Steve Welzer | 8,295 | 0.39% | N/A |
| Glass-Steagall Now | Diane W. Sare | 3,360 | 0.16% | N/A |
| Peace and Freedom | William Araujo | 3,300 | 0.16% | N/A |
| Independent | Hank Schroeder | 2,784 | 0.13% | N/A |
| NSA Did 911 | Jeff Boss | 2,062 | 0.10% | N/A |
| Total votes | | 2,120,866 | 100.00% | N/A |
| Republican hold | | | | |

=== By county ===
| County | Christie % | Christie votes | Buono % | Buono votes | Other % | Other votes |
|---|---|---|---|---|---|---|
| Atlantic | 62.2% | 43,975 | 36.1% | 25,557 | 1.6% | 1,166 |
| Bergen | 60.2% | 136,178 | 38.6% | 87,376 | 1.1% | 2,515 |
| Burlington | 62.3% | 79,220 | 36.3% | 46,161 | 1.3% | 1,698 |
| Camden | 54.8% | 64,545 | 43.7% | 51,546 | 1.5% | 1,786 |
| Cape May | 71.6% | 23,531 | 26.7% | 8,798 | 1.6% | 519 |
| Cumberland | 56.7% | 17,943 | 41.4% | 13,129 | 1.9% | 595 |
| Essex | 37.0% | 57,353 | 61.8% | 95,747 | 1.1% | 1,705 |
| Gloucester | 64.1% | 50,640 | 34.2% | 27,060 | 1.6% | 1,285 |
| Hudson | 43.6% | 42,567 | 54.7% | 53,386 | 1.7% | 1,632 |
| Hunterdon | 73.5% | 31,292 | 24.4% | 10,425 | 2.0% | 842 |
| Mercer | 51.9% | 48,530 | 46.3% | 43,282 | 1.7% | 1,621 |
| Middlesex | 58.3% | 101,619 | 40.2% | 70,225 | 1.4% | 2,468 |
| Monmouth | 70.7% | 123,417 | 27.7% | 48,477 | 1.6% | 2,753 |
| Morris | 70.1% | 98,888 | 28.2% | 39,824 | 1.7% | 2,382 |
| Ocean | 75.8% | 125,781 | 22.8% | 37,930 | 1.4% | 2,311 |
| Passaic | 52.9% | 53,858 | 45.9% | 46,825 | 1.1% | 1,140 |
| Salem | 66.6% | 12,748 | 30.7% | 5,889 | 2.6% | 495 |
| Somerset | 67.6% | 58,981 | 30.8% | 26,913 | 1.6% | 1,419 |
| Sussex | 71.1% | 29,873 | 25.4% | 10,704 | 3.4% | 1,419 |
| Union | 51.2% | 58,135 | 47.4% | 53,869 | 1.4% | 1,560 |
| Warren | 72.6% | 19,858 | 25.0% | 6,855 | 2.4% | 645 |

Counties that flipped from Democratic to Republican

- Bergen (largest municipality: Hackensack)
- Camden (largest municipality: Cherry Hill)
- Cumberland (largest municipality: Vineland)
- Mercer (largest municipality: Hamilton Township)
- Passaic (largest municipality: Paterson)
- Union (largest municipality: Elizabeth)

==== By congressional district ====
Christe won ten of 12 congressional districts, including four that elected Democrats, although he won the 9th district by a very narrow margin.

| District | Christie | Buono | Representative |
|---|---|---|---|
| 1st | 57.23% | 41.23% | Rob Andrews |
| 2nd | 65% | 33.2% | Frank LoBiondo |
| 3rd | 67.9% | 30.73% | Jon Runyan |
| 4th | 68.94% | 29.57% | Chris Smith |
| 5th | 65.2% | 33.27% | Scott Garrett |
| 6th | 59.84% | 38.63% | Frank Pallone Jr. |
| 7th | 69.61% | 28.64% | Leonard Lance |
| 8th | 43.4% | 54.97% | Albio Sires |
| 9th | 49.51% | 49.28% | Bill Pascrell |
| 10th | 26.64% | 72.23% | Donald Payne Jr. |
| 11th | 66.21% | 32.32% | Rodney Frelinghuysen |
| 12th | 57.07% | 41.42% | Rush Holt Jr. |

== See also ==
- 2009 New Jersey gubernatorial election
- Governors of New Jersey
- 2013 United States gubernatorial elections
- Fort Lee lane closure scandal
