= Bethanne McCarthy Patrick =

American politician (1970–2025)

Member of the New Jersey General Assembly from the 3rd district
- In office January 11, 2022 – January 9, 2024 Serving with Beth Sawyer
- Preceded by: John Burzichelli; Adam Taliaferro
- Succeeded by: David Bailey; Heather Simmons

Personal details
- Born: April 20, 1970
- Died: December 18, 2025 (aged 55)
- Party: Republican
- Website: Legislative webpage

Bethanne McCarthy Patrick (April 20, 1970 – December 18, 2025) was an American Republican Party politician who represented the 3rd Legislative District in the New Jersey General Assembly from January 11, 2022, to January 9, 2024.

McCarthy Patrick was an emergency medical technician for Inspira Health. She served on the board of education of the Mannington Township School District from 2019 to 2021.

== Background ==
McCarthy Patrick was born on April 20, 1970. She died on December 18, 2025, at the age of 55.

== New Jersey Assembly ==
In the 2021 general election, McCarthy Patrick, together with her Republican running mates Beth Sawyer in the Assembly and Edward Durr in the Senate, knocked off Democratic incumbents Stephen M. Sweeney in the Senate and John Burzichelli and Adam Taliaferro in the Assembly. Before the election, the district had been viewed as a "solidly 'blue'" safe district for Democrats.

McCarthy Patrick was one of a record seven new Republican Assemblywomen elected in the 2021 general election, joining seven Republican women incumbents who won re-election that year.

In the 2023 New Jersey General Assembly election, McCarthy Patrick and her running mate Thomas J. Tedesco were defeated by Democratic challengers Heather Simmons and David Bailey.

=== Committees ===
Committee assignments for the current session are:

- Environment and Solid Waste
- Health
- Housing

=== District 3 ===
Each of the 40 districts in the New Jersey Legislature has one representative in the New Jersey Senate and two members in the New Jersey General Assembly. Representatives from the 3rd District for the 2022—2023 Legislative Session are:

- Senator Edward Durr (R)
- Assemblywoman Bethanne McCarthy Patrick (R)
- Assemblywoman Beth Sawyer (R)

== Electoral history ==
=== Assembly ===
3rd Legislative District General Election, 2023
Party	Candidate	Votes	%
Democratic	Heather Simmons	30,861	25.6
Democratic	Dave Bailey Jr.	30,737	25.5
Republican	Bethanne McCarthy Patrick (incumbent)	29,522	24.5
Republican	Tom Tedesco	29,480	24.4
Total votes		120,600	100.0
Democratic gain from Republican			

2021 New Jersey General Assembly election for the 3rd Legislative District
Party	Candidate	Votes	%	±%
Republican	Beth Sawyer	33,878	26.2%	▲3.2
Republican	Bethanne McCarthy Patrick	33,735	26.1%	▲4.2
Democratic	John J. Burzichelli (Incumbent)	31,024	24.0%	▼3.8
Democratic	Adam Taliaferro (Incumbent)	30,537	23.6%	▼3.5
