= Heather Simmons (politician) =

American politician and lawyer

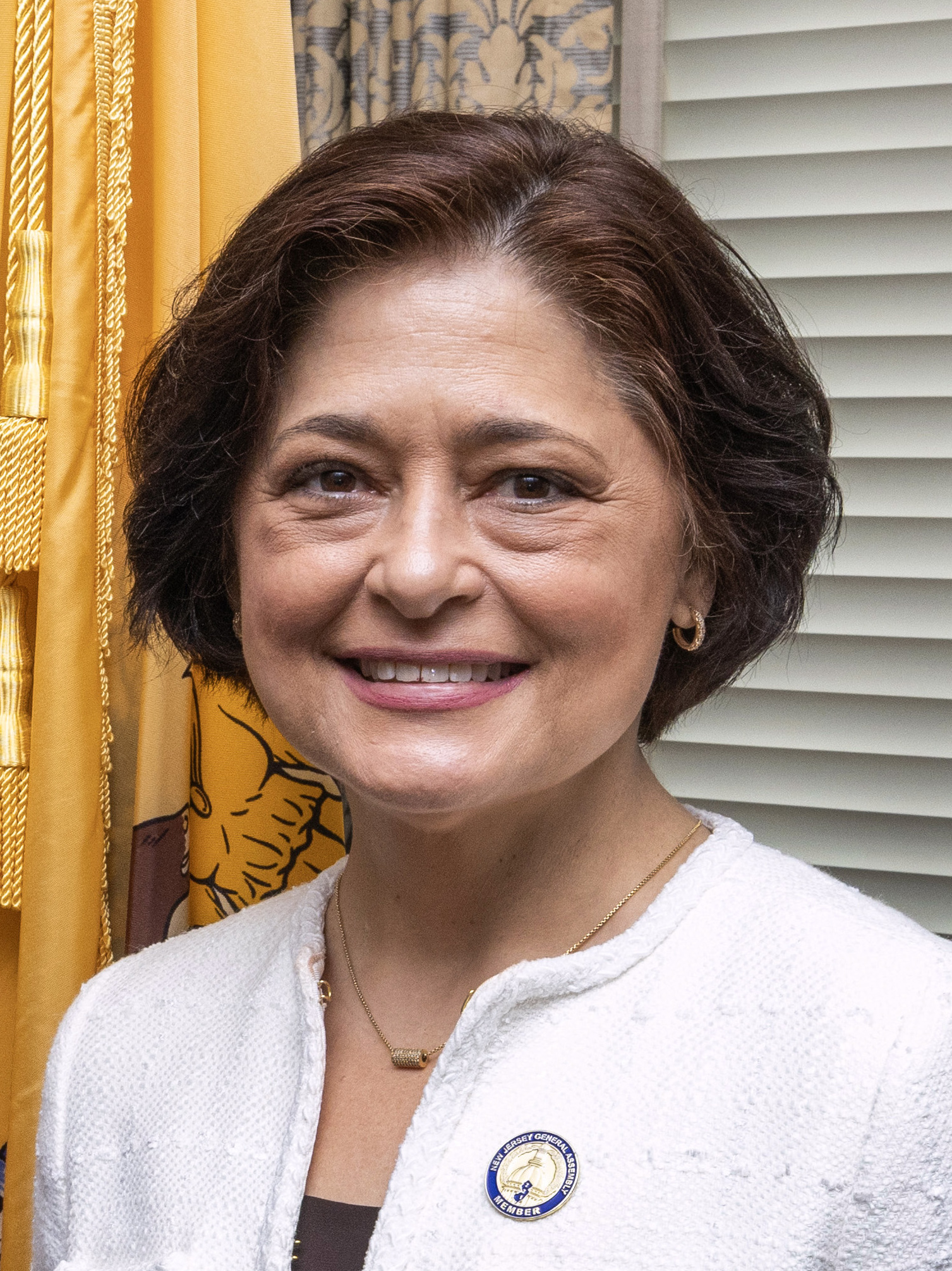
- Simmons in 2026

Member of the New Jersey General Assembly from the 3rd district
- Incumbent
- Assumed office January 9, 2024 Serving with David Bailey
- Preceded by: Beth Sawyer; Bethanne McCarthy Patrick

Personal details
- Born: 1968 or 1969 (age 57–58)
- Party: Democratic
- Education: Saint Joseph's University

Heather Simmons (born 1968 or 1969) is an American public relations professional and Democratic Party politician serving as a member of the New Jersey General Assembly for the 3rd legislative district, since taking office on January 9, 2024.

== Biography ==
A resident of Glassboro, New Jersey, Simmons serves is a public relations professional who serves as an assistant vice president at Rowan University. She graduated in 1991 from Saint Joseph's University.

== Elective office ==
Together with running mate Robert Zimmerman, she narrowly lost election in 2010 to the Gloucester County Board of Chosen Freeholders, despite the Democratic ticket outspending the Republicans by a 5–1 margin, but was chosen unanimously by the Gloucester County Democratic Committee and appointed to fill the one-year balance of the seat that had been held by Stephen Sweeney until he stepped down from office. She won full three-year teams of office as a freeholder (since renamed as commissioner) in 2011, 2014, 2017 and 2020.

In the 2023 New Jersey General Assembly election, Simmons and her Democratic running mate David Bailey defeated Republican incumbent Bethanne McCarthy Patrick and her running mate Thomas J. Tedesco.

=== District 3 ===
Each of the 40 districts in the New Jersey Legislature has one representative in the New Jersey Senate and two members in the New Jersey General Assembly. Representatives from the 3rd District for the 2024—2025 Legislative Session are:

- Senator John Burzichelli (D)
- Assemblyman David Bailey (D)
- Assemblywoman Heather Simmons (D)

== Electoral history ==
3rd Legislative District General Election, 2023
Party	Candidate	Votes	%
Democratic	Heather Simmons	30,861	25.6
Democratic	Dave Bailey Jr.	30,737	25.5
Republican	Bethanne McCarthy Patrick (incumbent)	29,522	24.5
Republican	Tom Tedesco	29,480	24.4
Total votes		120,600	100.0
Democratic gain from Republican			
