= Adam Taliaferro =

American politician (born 1982)

Member of the New Jersey General Assembly from the 3rd District
- In office January 29, 2015 – January 11, 2022 Serving with John Burzichelli
- Preceded by: Celeste Riley
- Succeeded by: Bethanne McCarthy-Patrick; Beth Sawyer

Deputy Majority Leader of the New Jersey General Assembly
- In office January 9, 2018 – January 11, 2022
- Leader: Craig Coughlin
- Preceded by: Angelica M. Jimenez

Chair of the New Jersey General Assembly Law and Public Safety Committee
- In office January 9, 2018 – January 11, 2022
- Preceded by: Daniel R. Benson

Member of the Gloucester County Board of Chosen Freeholders
- In office January 1, 2012 – January 29, 2015
- Preceded by: Steve Sweeney
- Succeeded by: Jim Jefferson

Personal details
- Born: January 1, 1982 (age 44) Voorhees, New Jersey
- Party: Democratic
- Education: Pennsylvania State University (B.S.); Rutgers Law School (J.D.)
- Website: Legislative web page

Adam J. Taliaferro (born January 1, 1982) is an American politician who served in the New Jersey General Assembly from the 3rd district from 2015 to 2022. He is a former American football player whose recovery from a paralyzing spinal cord injury sustained while playing cornerback for the Penn State Nittany Lions gained national media attention. He served on the Gloucester County Board of Chosen Freeholders for three years before his 2015 appointment to the New Jersey General Assembly. He served three terms before losing re-election in 2021.

== Football career ==
=== High school ===
Growing up in Voorhees Township, New Jersey, he was a standout running back and cornerback for the Eastern Regional High School Vikings. In two years of varsity football at Eastern High School, he averaged 9.4 yards per carry, racking up 62 touchdowns, and seven interceptions. Taliaferro was also a four-year varsity starter in basketball, and tied his school's record in the high jump set by Mark Blaszczyk in 1981 at 6 feet 6 inches (1.98 m).

=== Penn State ===
In 2000, Taliaferro joined the Penn State Nittany Lions football team as one of the top-rated freshmen of their 2000 recruiting class. Taliaferro earned playing time as a true freshman for Joe Paterno's Nittany Lions, despite Paterno's well-documented tendency to redshirt freshman players.

=== Injury and recovery ===
On September 23, 2000, while playing in only the fifth game of his college career, Taliaferro sustained a career-ending spinal cord injury while tackling tailback Jerry Westbrooks during Penn State's game versus Ohio State. Taliaferro's helmet had hit Westbrooks' knee during the tackle, bursting the fifth cervical vertebra in his neck and bruising his spinal cord. Unable to control his fall, the crown of his helmet hit the turf and his body rolled awkwardly over his neck. Taliaferro was paralyzed on the hit, which left him with no movement from the neck down.

Taliaferro had surgery at the Ohio State Medical Center to fuse his C-5 vertebra. After successful surgery, Taliaferro was airlifted back to Thomas Jefferson University Hospital in Philadelphia, Pennsylvania, to begin his recovery. Although surgery was successful, Taliaferro was only given a 3% chance of ever walking again.

He began his well-publicized rehab at Magee Rehabilitation Hospital in Philadelphia, Pennsylvania. After eight months of rehab, Taliaferro had learned to walk again. Taliaferro returned to Penn State less than a year after his injury. He led the Penn State Nittany Lions football team onto Beaver Stadium's field for the first game of the 2001 season against the Miami Hurricanes in front of a record crowd of 109,313. Taliaferro skipped, then jogged onto the field in front of an emotional Penn State crowd.

He remained part of the football team as a student-assistant coach under Joe Paterno. Taliaferro earned a Bachelor of Science in Labor and Industrial Relations from Penn State in 2005.

In 2001, a book was written by Sam Carchidi and Scott Brown to chronicle Taliaferro's life and recovery, entitled Miracle in the Making. Taliaferro created his own foundation to help support others with spinal cord injuries. The foundation was created in 2001, and continues to grow each year. The foundation has been said to raise over $80,000 per year for spinal cord injuries.

== Political career ==
=== Gloucester County Freeholder ===
On November 8, 2011, he was elected to serve on the Gloucester County Board of Chosen Freeholders. A resident of Woolwich Township, he assumed office on January 6, 2012. He subsequently won reelection to the Freeholder board in 2014 and served until his appointment to the General Assembly.

=== New Jersey General Assembly ===
Following the resignation of Assemblywoman Celeste Riley in 2015, Taliaferro was chosen by the local Democratic committees of the 3rd district to fill the vacant seat. He was sworn in on January 29, 2015. He was elected in his own right to the seat in 2015, 2017 and 2019. Taliaferro was appointed as a Deputy Majority Leader on January 9, 2018. He was also chosen to chair the Law and Public Safety Committee.

In 2021, Taliaferro and his running mates, Senate President Steve Sweeney and Assemblyman John Burzichelli, were defeated by their Republican opponents.

==== Committee assignments ====
- Agriculture and Natural Resources
- Education
- Legislative Services Commission
- Law and Public Safety

=== Electoral history ===
2021 New Jersey General Assembly election for the 3rd Legislative District
Party	Candidate	Votes	%	±%
Republican	Beth Sawyer	33,878	26.2%	▲3.2
Republican	Bethanne McCarthy Patrick	33,735	26.1%	▲4.2
Democratic	John J. Burzichelli (Incumbent)	31,024	24.0%	▼3.8
Democratic	Adam Taliaferro (Incumbent)	30,537	23.6%	▼3.5
Total votes		129,174	100.0%	

2019 New Jersey General Assembly election for the 3rd Legislative District
Party	Candidate	Votes	%	±%
Democratic	John Burzichelli (Incumbent)	23,811	27.8%	▼2.5
Democratic	Adam Taliaferro (Incumbent)	23,719	27.1%	▼2.1
Republican	Beth Sawyer	19,704	23.0%	▲2.7
Republican	Edward R. Durr	18,742	21.9%	▲2.7
Total votes				

New Jersey general election, 2017
Party	Candidate	Votes	%	±%
Democratic	John J. Burzichelli	31,853	30.3	▲1.8
Democratic	Adam Taliaferro	30,733	29.2	▲2.1
Republican	Philip J. Donohue	21,758	20.7	▼1.6
Republican	Linwood H. Donelson III	20,181	19.2	▼1.2
One for All	Edward R. Durr	589	0.6	N/A
Total votes		'105,114'	'100.0'	

New Jersey general election, 2015
Party	Candidate	Votes	%	±%
Democratic	John Burzichelli	20,507	28.5	▲0.5
Democratic	Adam Taliaferro	19,480	27.1	▲0.2
Republican	Samuel J. Maccarone Jr.	16,063	22.3	▼0.3
Republican	Leroy P. Pierce III	14,715	20.4	▼2.0
The People's Voice	John Kalnas	1,223	1.7	N/A
Total votes		'71,988'	'100.0'	

== Personal life ==
Taliaferro enrolled at Rutgers School of Law–Camden in Camden, New Jersey. He earned his J.D. in May 2008 and worked as a lawyer at Duane Morris in the firm's Cherry Hill office for five years. In September 2012, he joined pharmaceutical company Bristol-Myers Squibb as a healthcare advocate, focusing on mental health, oncology, and HIV products. Taliaferro also runs his own foundation which helps student athletes with head or spinal injuries and is a motivational speaker, doing corporate appearances and speaking at schools.

In 2008, he was named the recipient of the Philadelphia Sports Writers Association "Humanitarian Award". In the spring of 2012, he was elected to the Penn State Board of Trustees. Following his appointment to the New Jersey General Assembly, he announced he would not seek a second term on the board.

New Jersey General Assembly
Preceded by Celeste Riley	Member of the New Jersey General Assembly for the 3rd District; January 29, 2015 – January 11, 2022; With: John J. Burzichelli	Succeeded by Bethanne McCarthy-Patrick; Beth Sawyer
