= Beth Sawyer =

Member of the New Jersey General Assembly

Member of the New Jersey General Assembly from the 3rd district
- In office January 11, 2022 – January 9, 2024 Serving with Bethanne McCarthy Patrick
- Preceded by: John Burzichelli; Adam Taliaferro
- Succeeded by: Heather Simmons; David Bailey

Personal details
- Party: Republican
- Website: Legislative webpage

Beth Sawyer is an American Republican Party politician who represented the 3rd Legislative District in the New Jersey General Assembly since from January 11, 2022 to January 9, 2024.

A realtor and resident of Woolwich Township, New Jersey, Sawyer came in third in the 2018 race for township council.

== New Jersey Assembly ==
In the 2021 general election, Sawyer, together with her Republican running mates Bethanne McCarthy Patrick in the Assembly and Edward Durr in the Senate, knocked off Democratic incumbents Stephen M. Sweeney in the Senate and John Burzichelli and Adam Taliaferro in the Assembly. Before the election, the district had been viewed as a "solidly 'blue'" safe district for Democrats.

Sawyer was one of a record seven new Republican Assemblywomen elected in the 2021 general election, joining seven Republican women incumbents who won re-election that year.

In the June 2023 Republican primary, Sawyer ran against incumbent Edward Durr for the 3rd district seat in the New Jersey Senate. Durr won by a 65-35% margin winning all 38 of the municipalities in the district.

=== Committees ===
Committee assignments for the current session are:

- Aging and Senior Services
- Telecommunications and Utilities

=== District 3 ===
Each of the 40 districts in the New Jersey Legislature has one representative in the New Jersey Senate and two members in the New Jersey General Assembly. Representatives from the 3rd District for the 2022—2023 Legislative Session are:

- Senator Edward Durr (R)
- Assemblywoman Bethanne McCarthy Patrick (R)
- Assemblywoman Beth Sawyer (R)

== 2025 New Jersey Assembly Election ==
On January 4, 2025, Beth Sawyer declared her intent in a letter to run for her old Assembly seat, which she vacated in 2023, to challenge then-State Senator Edward Durr in the Republican primary. Sawyer withdrew from the Assembly race on March 24.

== Electoral history ==
=== Assembly ===
2021 New Jersey General Assembly election for the 3rd Legislative District
Party	Candidate	Votes	%	±%
Republican	Beth Sawyer	33,878	26.2%	▲3.2
Republican	Bethanne McCarthy-Patrick	33,735	26.1%	▲4.2
Democratic	John J. Burzichelli (Incumbent)	31,024	24.0%	▼3.8
Democratic	Adam Taliaferro (Incumbent)	30,537	23.6%	▼3.5
