= John Burzichelli =

Member of the New Jersey General Assembly

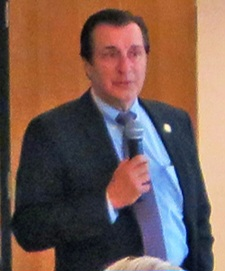
- Burzichelli in 2018

Member of the New Jersey Senate from the 3rd district
- Incumbent
- Assumed office January 9, 2024
- Preceded by: Edward Durr

Member of the New Jersey General Assembly from the 3rd district
- In office January 8, 2002 – January 11, 2022 Serving with Adam Taliaferro
- Preceded by: Jack Collins; Gary Stuhltrager
- Succeeded by: Bethanne McCarthy Patrick; Beth Sawyer

Deputy Speaker of the New Jersey General Assembly
- In office January 10, 2006 – January 11, 2022
- Leader: Joseph J. Roberts; Sheila Oliver; Vincent Prieto; Craig Coughlin
- Preceded by: Herb Conaway

Chair of the New Jersey General Assembly Appropriations Committee
- In office January 10, 2012 – January 11, 2022
- Preceded by: Nellie Pou

Chair of the New Jersey General Assembly Gaming Committee
- In office January 8, 2008 – January 10, 2012

Mayor of Paulsboro, New Jersey
- In office January 1, 1996 – December 31, 2011
- Preceded by: James A. Sabetta
- Succeeded by: Jeffery Hamilton

Personal details
- Born: November 14, 1954 (age 71)
- Party: Democratic
- Website: Legislative Website

John J. Burzichelli (born November 14, 1954) is an American Democratic Party politician from Paulsboro, New Jersey, who has been the Senator from the state's 3rd Legislative District since January 9, 2024, a seat which he won after defeating incumbent Republican Edward Durr in the 2023 elections.

Prior to winning election to the state Senate, Burzichelli served in New Jersey General Assembly for the 3rd District from 2002 to 2022, spending the last sixteen years of his time there as the Deputy Speaker of the Assembly.

== New Jersey Assembly ==
Burzichelli was the Assistant Majority Leader during the 2004-05 session and has been the Assembly's Deputy Speaker since 2006. Burzichelli had been the Mayor of Paulsboro from 1996 until 2011. From 2002 until 2011, he served as both mayor and Assemblyman which was allowed in New Jersey until 2007 when dual mandates were banned. Burzichelli was grandfathered under the law passed and allowed to continue serve in both posts until he stepped down from the mayoral post in 2011. He was president of Paulsboro Chamber of Commerce and a member of the New Jersey State League of Municipalities Executive Board. In the 2011 apportionment based on the results of the 2010 United States census, Republican Domenick DiCicco was moved from the 4th Legislative District into District 3. Burzichelli (with 25,172 votes) and Celeste Riley (23,960) won re-election, defeating DiCicco (20,268) and his running mate Bob Villare (20,528). DiCicco's loss made his seat the only gain by the Democrats in the Assembly in the 2011 election cycle. In December 2016, Burzichelli was one of several Catholic elected officials who supported legislation legalizing assisted suicide, saying that state residents should be able to make their own decisions on a matter that "is about choice". In 2019 the Assisted Suicide bill passed the legislature.

In the 2021 general election, Democratic incumbents Stephen M. Sweeney in the Senate and Burzichelli and Adam Taliaferro in the Assembly lost to their respective Republican challengers, Bethanne McCarthy Patrick and Beth Sawyer in the Assembly and Edward Durr in the Senate. Before the election, the district had been viewed as a "solidly blue" safe district for Democrats.

== New Jersey Senate ==
In the 2023 general election, Burzichelli ran for the Senate seat together with Heather Simmons and David Bailey in the Assembly, defeating Edward Durr in the Senate, and Republican incumbent Bethanne McCarthy Patrick and newcomer Thomas J. Tedesco, Jr. in the Assembly, taking back the district for the Democrats.

=== Committee assignments ===
Committee assignments for the 2024—2025 Legislative Session are:

- Budget and Appropriations
- Legislative Oversight
- Transportation

=== District 3 ===
Each of the 40 districts in the New Jersey Legislature has one representative in the New Jersey Senate and two members in the New Jersey General Assembly. Representatives from the 3rd District for the 2024—2025 Legislative Session are:

- Senator John Burzichelli (D)
- Assemblyman David Bailey (D)
- Assemblywoman Heather Simmons (D)

== Personal life ==
Burzichelli is a long-time resident of Paulsboro. He is of Italian descent. His father, John D. Burzichelli also served as mayor of the borough. He is a 1972 graduate of Paulsboro High School. Burzichelli makes a brief cameo in Kevin Smith's film Jersey Girl, parts of which were filmed in Paulsboro. He is owner / producer / distributor of Hill Studio & Scenic. He is as a former movie producer and wrestling promoter. He owns a number of antique fire engines using them for both business (Hill Studio) and pleasure and is a member of the Glasstown Antique Fire Brigade. He also owns the remnants of the Ward LaFrance a now-defunct fire engine manufacturer. Several of his antique fire engines are Ward LaFrance models of varying years. Burzichelli co-authored the book Ward LaFrance Fire Trucks: 1918-1978 Photo Archive. One of his fire trucks, formerly owned by Trenton Psychiatric Hospital, is displayed on the cover. He is one of the founding members of the Boys and Girls Club of Greater Paulsboro and a former President of the Greater Paulsboro Chamber of Commerce. Burzichelli is the co-host of the show Eye on Paulsboro which has been on cable for over 25 years.

== Electoral history ==
=== Senate ===
3rd Legislative District General Election, 2023
Party	Candidate	Votes	%
Democratic	John J. Burzichelli	32,382	53.6
Republican	Edward Durr (incumbent)	28,018	46.4
Total votes		60,400	100.0
Democratic gain from Republican			

=== Assembly ===
2021 New Jersey General Assembly election for the 3rd Legislative District
Party	Candidate	Votes	%	±%
Republican	Beth Sawyer	33,878	26.2%	▲3.2
Republican	Bethanne McCarthy Patrick	33,735	26.1%	▲4.2
Democratic	John J. Burzichelli (incumbent)	31,024	24.0%	▼3.8
Democratic	Adam Taliaferro (incumbent)	30,537	23.6%	▼3.5
Total votes		129,174	100.0%	

2019 New Jersey General Assembly election for the 3rd Legislative District
Party	Candidate	Votes	%	±%
Democratic	John Burzichelli (incumbent)	23,811	27.8%	▼2.5
Democratic	Adam Taliaferro (incumbent)	23,719	27.1%	▼2.1
Republican	Beth Sawyer	19,704	23.0%	▲2.7
Republican	Edward R. Durr	18,742	21.9%	▲2.7
Total votes				

2017 New Jersey General Assembly election for the 3rd Legislative District
Party	Candidate	Votes	%	±%
Democratic	John Burzichelli (incumbent)	31,853	30.3	▲1.8
Democratic	Adam Taliaferro (incumbent)	30,733	29.2	▲2.1
Republican	Philip J. Donohue	21,758	20.7	▼1.6
Republican	Linwood H. Donelson III	20,181	19.2	▼1.2
One for All	Edward R. Durr	589	0.6	N/A
Total votes		'105,114'	'100.0'	

2015 New Jersey General Assembly election for the 3rd Legislative District
Party	Candidate	Votes	%	±%
Democratic	John Burzichelli (incumbent)	20,507	28.5	▲0.5
Democratic	Adam Taliaferro (incumbent)	19,480	27.1	▲0.2
Republican	Samuel J. Maccarone Jr.	16,063	22.3	▼0.3
Republican	Leroy P. Pierce III	14,715	20.4	▼2.0
The People's Voice	John Kalnas	1,223	1.7	N/A
Total votes		'71,988'	'100.0'	

2013 New Jersey General Assembly election for the 3rd Legislative District
Party	Candidate	Votes	%	±%
Democratic	John Burzichelli (incumbent)	31,049	28.0	0.0
Democratic	Celeste Riley (incumbent)	29,870	26.9	▲0.3
Republican	Larry Wallace	25,094	22.6	▼0.2
Republican	Bob Vanderslice	24,823	22.4	▼0.1
Total votes		'110,836'	'100.0'	

2011 New Jersey General Assembly election for the 3rd Legislative District
Party	Candidate	Votes	%
Democratic	John Burzichelli (incumbent)	25,172	28.0
Democratic	Celeste Riley (incumbent)	23,960	26.6
Republican	Bob Villare	20,528	22.8
Republican	Domenick DiCicco (incumbent)	20,268	22.5
Total votes		89,928	100.0

2009 New Jersey General Assembly election for the 3rd Legislative District
Party	Candidate	Votes	%	±%
Democratic	John Burzichelli (incumbent)	35,423	28.3	▼1.2
Democratic	Celeste Riley (incumbent)	31,888	25.5	▼3.8
Republican	Robert Villare	30,526	24.4	▲5.4
Republican	Lee Lucas	27,316	21.8	▲3.4
Total votes		'125,153'	'100.0'	

2007 New Jersey General Assembly election for the 3rd Legislative District
Party	Candidate	Votes	%	±%
Democratic	John Burzichelli (incumbent)	30,222	29.5	▼0.1
Democratic	Douglas H. Fisher (incumbent)	30,078	29.3	▼0.2
Republican	Phil Donohue	19,534	19.0	▼1.2
Republican	Jeffrey Stepler	18,927	18.4	▼1.1
Green	Margie MacWilliams	2,078	2.0	N/A
Green	Charles Woodrow	1,755	1.7	N/A
Total votes		'102,594'	'100.0'	

2005 New Jersey General Assembly election for the 3rd Legislative District
Party	Candidate	Votes	%	±%
Democratic	John Burzichelli (incumbent)	35,339	29.6	▲4.3
Democratic	Douglas H. Fisher (incumbent)	35,265	29.5	▲4.1
Republican	Phillip S. Rhudy	24,140	20.2	▼3.2
Republican	James W. Zee III	23,297	19.5	▼3.0
Constitution	John Leone	1,535	1.3	N/A
Total votes		'119,576'	'100.0'	

2003 New Jersey General Assembly election for the 3rd Legislative District
Party	Candidate	Votes	%	±%
Democratic	Douglas H. Fisher (incumbent)	27,178	25.4	▼2.7
Democratic	John Burzichelli (incumbent)	27,110	25.3	▼1.3
Republican	Susan Bestwick	25,056	23.4	▲0.6
Republican	Douglas Sorantino	24,069	22.5	0.0
Green	Peggy Murphy	1,951	1.8	N/A
Green	Charles Woodrow	1,627	1.5	N/A
Total votes		'106,991'	'100.0'	

2001 New Jersey General Assembly election for the 3rd Legislative District
Party	Candidate	Votes	%
Democratic	Douglas H. Fisher (incumbent)	31,886	28.1
Democratic	John Burzichelli (incumbent)	30,213	26.6
Republican	Michael H. Facemyer	25,823	22.8
Republican	Harold U. Johnson	25,509	22.5
Total votes		113,431	100.0

1999 New Jersey General Assembly election for the 3rd Legislative District
Party	Candidate	Votes	%	±%
Republican	Jack Collins (incumbent)	28,609	31.0	▼5.3
Republican	Gary Stuhltrager (incumbent)	24,573	26.6	▼7.5
Democratic	John Burzichelli	20,658	22.4	▲1.6
Democratic	Ron Brittin	15,440	16.7	▲15.4
Conservative	Jan McFetridge	1,599	1.7	▼2.0
Conservative	Bob McFetridge	1,333	1.4	▼2.5
Total votes		'92,212'	'100.0'	

Political offices
Preceded by James A. Sabetta	Mayor of Paulsboro, New Jersey; January 1, 1996–December 31, 2011	Succeeded by W. Jeffery Hamilton
New Jersey General Assembly
Preceded by Gary Stuhltrager	Member of the New Jersey General Assembly from the 3rd district January 8, 2002–January 11, 2022; Served alongside: Douglas H. Fisher, Celeste Riley, Adam Taliaferro	Succeeded by Bethanne McCarthy Patrick; Beth Sawyer
New Jersey Senate
Preceded by Edward Durr	Member of the New Jersey Senate from the 3rd district January 9, 2024–present	Incumbent
