= Repaupo, New Jersey =

Populated place in Gloucester County, New Jersey, US

- Unincorporated community
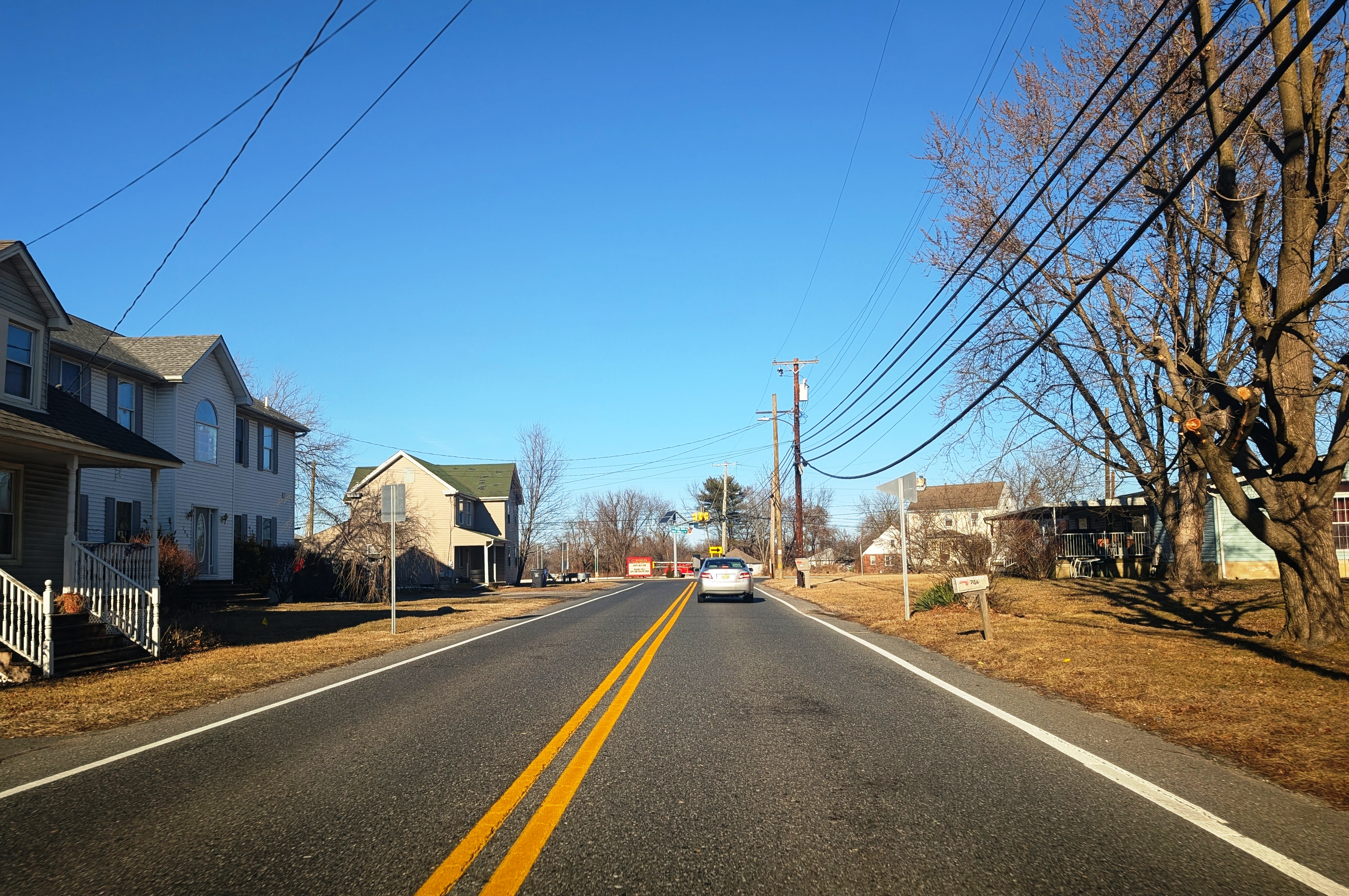
- CR 653 northbound in Repaupo

- Repaupo's location in Gloucester County (Inset: Gloucester County in New Jersey) Repaupo (New Jersey) Repaupo (the United States)
- Coordinates: 39°47′59″N 75°17′56″W
- Country: United States
- State: New Jersey
- County: Gloucester
- Township: Logan
- Elevation: 20 ft (6.1 m)
- Time zone: UTC−05:00 (Eastern (EST))
  - Summer (DST): UTC−04:00 (EDT)
- Area code: 856
- GNIS feature ID: 879660

Repaupo is an unincorporated community located within Logan Township in Gloucester County, in the U.S. state of New Jersey. Repaupo can be accessed by Interstate 295/U.S. Route 130, via exit 14.

The community was settled in the 17th century by Swedes from the former colony of New Sweden. Men such as Andreas Anderson, former trumpeter to Governor Printz, was one of the prominent settlers.

== Notable people ==
People who were born in, residents of, or otherwise closely associated with Repaupo include:

- Edward Durr (born 1963), politician and truck driver who represents the 3rd Legislative district in the New Jersey Senate.
