= Celeste Riley =

American politician

Cumberland County Clerk
- Incumbent
- Assumed office January 1, 2015
- Preceded by: Gloria Noto

Member of the New Jersey General Assembly from the 3rd district
- In office March 19, 2009 – January 1, 2015 Serving with John J. Burzichelli
- Preceded by: Douglas H. Fisher
- Succeeded by: Adam Taliaferro

Personal details
- Born: February 4, 1960 (age 66) Cumberland County, New Jersey
- Party: Democratic
- Spouse: Richard Dawson
- Children: 5
- Education: La Salle University (B.A.); Drexel University (M.S.)
- Website: Legislative web page

Celeste M. Riley (born February 4, 1960) is an American Democratic Party politician, who currently serves as the Clerk of Cumberland County, in the U.S. state of New Jersey. She previously served in the New Jersey General Assembly from 2009 to 2015, where she represented the 3rd legislative district. Riley is the first woman to represent this district in the New Jersey Legislature.

== Personal background ==
Riley is the daughter of Joseph J. Riley Sr., a physician who served on the Cumberland County Board of Chosen Freeholders in the 1970s and ran unsuccessfully for the General Assembly in 1993. Her brother Joseph Jr. served one term on the Cumberland County Freeholder Board from 2007 to 2009.

Riley graduated from Cumberland Regional High School, earned a Bachelor of Arts degree in music from La Salle University and a Master's degree from Drexel University in arts administration. She later attended Cumberland County College where she received qualifications to teach computer technology. She taught for the Greenwich-Stow Creek Partnership Schools in Greenwich Township from 2001 to 2014.

Riley is a resident of Bridgeton, and is a member of the parish of The Holy Cross where she cantors. She is a member of Soroptimists International of Cumberland County, an organization devoted to fundraising for various woman's issues and scholarships. In April 2012, Riley was awarded the "Love Shouldn't Hurt" award from the I'm Free Ministries, a Project of Gererations, Inc. In 2011, Salem County Woman's Center recognized Assemblywoman Riley as "Person of the Year" for her efforts in support of victims of domestic violence.

First elected to the Bridgeton City Council in 2006, she later became City Council President. While on council she helped create the community pride program Building a Better Bridgeton (B3). She has two daughters from her first marriage, she is now married to Richard Dawson and has three stepdaughters.

== Assembly career ==
In March 2009, 3rd District Assemblyman Douglas H. Fisher was appointed to head the New Jersey Department of Agriculture. Riley was chosen among a special convention of Cumberland, Gloucester, and Salem county Democrats to replace him in the Assembly. She was sworn in on March 19, 2009 becoming the first woman to represent the district.

In her final term in the Assembly, Riley served as Chair of the Higher Education Committee and was a member of the Agriculture and Natural Resources Committee and the Regulated Professions Committee.

Riley sponsored legislation (A-1491) that tightens restrictions on repeat domestic violence offenders by raising bail requirements. She also sponsored A1561, which creates a diversionary program designed to educate teens on the dangers of "sexting" instead of automatically criminalizing the behavior.

Riley sponsored legislation such as, A-3063 and A-3064 that would enhance the State's farm winery industry and could bring more tourism to the area.

The Assemblywoman sponsored legislation that would have increased State support during State Fiscal Year 2011 for the Pharmaceutical Assistance to the Aged and Disabled Program, the Senior Gold Prescription Discount Program and the Homestead Property Tax Rebate/Credit program. Assemblywoman Riley has passed legislation that protects assisted living residents from eviction for using Medicaid, after reports from the state Office of the Public Advocate indicated that certain facilities were evicting patients after they exhausted their personal finances and were eligible for Medicaid, in favor of private-pay patients.

In New Jersey, it is no longer legal for employers to specify in their job ads that unemployed persons will not be considered. Assemblywoman Riley was a primary sponsor in legislation that bans overt discrimination against the jobless in print or online was signed into law March 29, 2011, by Gov. Chris Christie and is the first legislation of its kind in the United States. Employers would face a penalty of $1,000 for the first offense and $5,000 for subsequent offenses.

In recognition of the importance of the American Red Cross, she was the primary sponsor of legislation, signed by Gov. Christie, that designates March as "American Red Cross" month for the State of New Jersey.

In the 2011 apportionment based on the results of the 2010 United States census, Dominick DiCicco was moved from the 4th Legislative District into District 3. John J. Burzichelli (with 25,172 votes) and Riley (23,960) won re-election, defeating DiCicco (20,268) and his running mate Bob Villare (20,528) DiCicco's loss made his seat the only gain by the Democrats in the Assembly in the 2011 election cycle.

=== District 3 ===
Each of the forty districts in the New Jersey Legislature has one representative in the New Jersey Senate and two members in the New Jersey General Assembly. The other representatives from the 3rd District during the time she was in the Assembly were:

- Senate President Stephen M. Sweeney
- Assemblyman John J. Burzichelli

== County Clerk ==
In 2014, Riley challenged incumbent Republican Cumberland County Clerk Gloria Noto, a position she held for 20 years. Riley won the race defeating Noto by two percentage points. As a result of her win, Riley resigned her teaching and Assembly positions. She is now currently serving her second 5-year term.

Political offices
Preceded by Gloria Noto	Cumberland County Clerk; January 2, 2015 – present	Succeeded by Incumbent
New Jersey General Assembly
Preceded by Douglas H. Fisher	Member of the New Jersey General Assembly for the 3rd District; March 19, 2009 – January 2, 2015; With: John Burzichelli	Succeeded by Adam Taliaferro
