= David Bailey (New Jersey politician) =

American politician (born 1967)

David Bailey Jr.
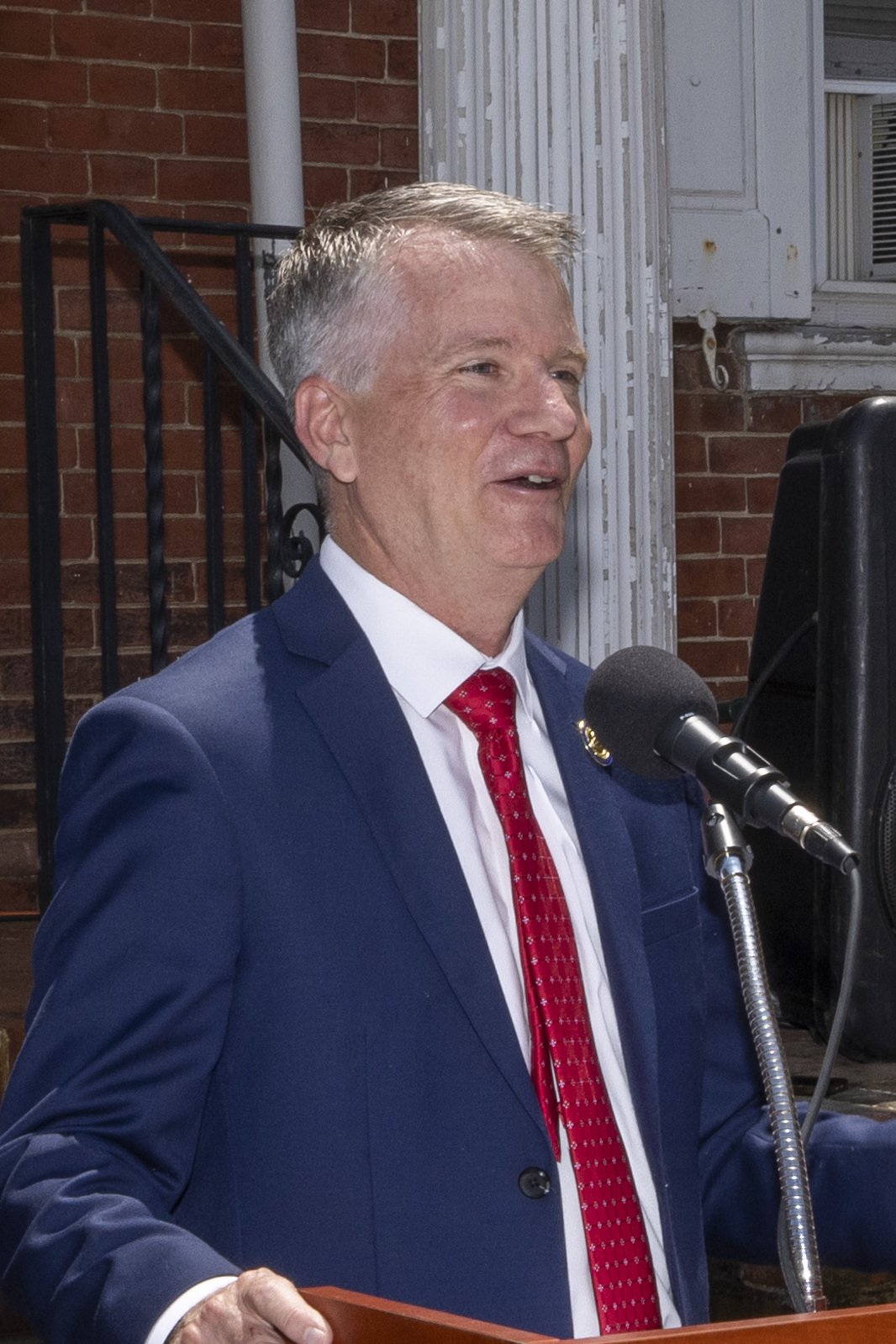

Member of the New Jersey General Assembly from the 3rd district
- Incumbent
- Assumed office January 9, 2024 Serving with Heather Simmons
- Preceded by: Beth Sawyer; Bethanne McCarthy Patrick

Personal details
- Born: David Lee Bailey Jr. March 1, 1967 (age 59) Mannington Township, New Jersey, U.S.
- Party: Democratic
- Spouse: Julie
- Children: 3
- Education: Pennsylvania State University; Eastern University

David Lee Bailey Jr. (born March 1, 1967) is an American Democratic Party politician who has represented the 3rd legislative district in the New Jersey General Assembly since taking office on January 9, 2024.

== Biography ==
David Lee Bailey Jr. was born on March 1, 1967, at the Memorial Hospital of Salem County in Mannington Township, New Jersey. He grew up in Alloway Township, New Jersey, Bailey attended Woodstown High School. He graduated from the Pennsylvania State University with a bachelor’s degree in administration of justice and Eastern University with a master's degree in non-profit management. As of 2023, Bailey lives in Woodstown, New Jersey. He and his wife, Julie, have three children.

Bailey has led Ranch Hope, a nonprofit organization founded by his father, which provides behavioral health care, education, short-term shelter care, supportive housing, and adventure-based services for thousands of children and families annually.

== Elective office ==
Bailey was selected as part of a Democratic slate that included Heather Simmons for Assembly and Senate candidate John Burzichelli.

In the 2023 New Jersey General Assembly election, Bailey and his Democratic running mate Heather Simmons defeated Republican incumbent Bethanne McCarthy Patrick and her running mate Thomas J. Tedesco. Bailey was one of 27 members elected for the first time in 2023 to serve in the General Assembly, more than one-third of the seats.

=== District 3 ===
Each of the 40 districts in the New Jersey Legislature has one representative in the New Jersey Senate and two members in the New Jersey General Assembly. Representatives from the 3rd District for the 2024—2025 Legislative Session are:

- Senator John Burzichelli (D)
- Assemblyman David Bailey (D)
- Assemblywoman Heather Simmons (D)

== Electoral history ==
3rd Legislative District General Election, 2023
Party	Candidate	Votes	%
Democratic	Heather Simmons	30,861	25.6
Democratic	Dave Bailey Jr.	30,737	25.5
Republican	Bethanne McCarthy Patrick (incumbent)	29,522	24.5
Republican	Tom Tedesco	29,480	24.4
Total votes		120,600	100.0
Democratic gain from Republican			
