= Magee Rehabilitation Hospital =

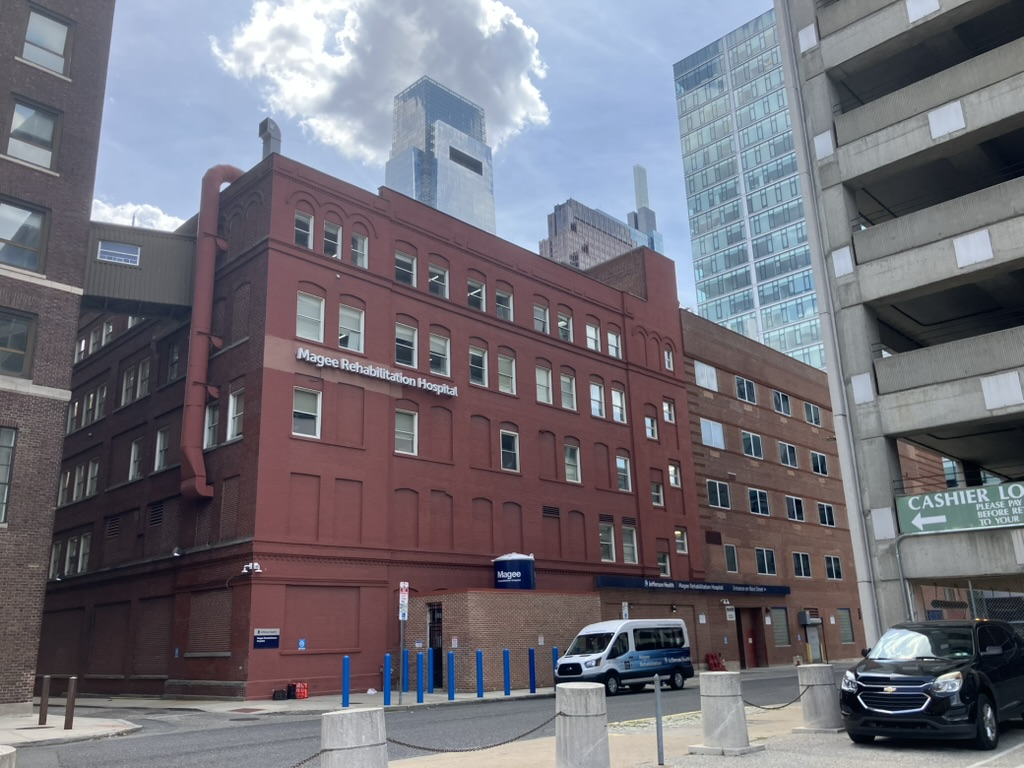
- Magee Rehabilitation Hospital's back entrance exterior in June, 2026

Geography
- Location: 1513 Race Street, Philadelphia, Pennsylvania, U.S., Philadelphia metropolitan area, U.S.
- Coordinates: 39°57′23.83″N 75°09′55.66″W

Organisation
- Affiliated university: Thomas Jefferson University Hospital

Services
- Standards: JCAHO & CARF Accreditation

History
- Founded: 1958

Links
- Website: www.mageerehab.org
- Lists: Hospitals in U.S.

Magee Rehabilitation Hospital, part of Jefferson Health, founded in 1958, is a 83-bed specialty medical rehabilitation hospital providing physical and cognitive rehabilitation services. Magee's flagship facility is located in Center City Philadelphia. In addition to the main campus that offers comprehensive services for spinal cord injury, brain injury, stroke, orthopedic replacement, amputation, pain management and work injury, Magee provides an expanding outpatient network serving the surrounding communities.

== History ==
Mage Rehabilitation Hospital was founded in 1968 by the philanthropy of Anna Justina Magee, a fifth-generation descendant of Johann Christian and Christina Kneass who arrived in Philadelphia from Rotterdam in September 1753. Magee was born on January 21, 1843, the fourth daughter and one of seven children of James and Caroline Magee. In her will, in memory of her parents, she endowed the Magee Professorship of Medicine at The Jefferson Medical College. With a gift of $1,285,000, she established what is present-day Magee Rehabilitation Hospital.

Anna Magee believed that the city's hospital wards were overcrowded because needy patients, although they could not resume their normal occupations or duties, remained there too long after passing the initial stage of acute illness or injury. She also did not want patients' families to be burdened with their support. She envisioned a hospital for convalescents—one, she stated that should ensure "the highest degree of reasonable comfort and healthfulness," in a "stately and dignified" building in which "no money should be misused for architectural ornament."

In 1985, Magee's brain injury rehabilitation program became the first in the nation to be accredited by the Commission on the Accreditation of Rehabilitation Facilities. Magee partnered with Jefferson Hospital to create one of the nation's 14 federally-designated centers for spinal cord injury rehabilitation. Magee has been rated one of the nation's leading rehabilitation hospitals by U.S. News & World Report. Magee provides treatment to more than 5,000 individuals annually. Magee is authorized to treat wounded military personnel returning from war. Magee is not an Obligated Group Affiliate.

Under Chairman C. Stevenson Newhall, M.D., the first board meeting took place on June 2, 1925. A committee was appointed to study the will, survey hospital needs, and come up with the best plan to follow. At following meetings the board decided that construction should not begin until $2.5 million had been accrued, and that money for the site and building should come from income, not principal holdings in the estate.

Dr. Howard A. Rusk, of the Institute of Rehabilitation Medicine in New York City, demonstrated that rehabilitation, not convalescence, was better able to restore soldiers to their former abilities. Frank H. Krusen, M.D., called the "Father of Physical Medicine," was developing theories and treatments in physical medicine while treating patients with disabilities and chronic diseases at the Mayo Clinic.

In 1954, the Orphan's Court of Philadelphia permitted the use of the Magee Trust Fund to establish a rehabilitation center, ruling that rehabilitation was now seen as a dynamic form of convalescent care and that such service was consistent with the wishes of Anna Magee.

The search for a founding director of the hospital led to H. Frazer Parry, M.D., who studied with Drs. Rusk and Krusen. He assumed the post in September 1955, setting up office space at 1500 Walnut Street, where he worked with a team to find an appropriate building for the hospital.

A former factory at 1513 Race Street was ideal because of its central location, open floor space, and relatively few walls that would have to be taken down. The building was purchased from American Meter Company, and construction and renovations began in December 1956. The total cost of the project, which was designed for 39 patients, amounted to about $2.5 million.

Opening ceremonies for Magee Memorial Hospital for Convalescents were held on March 9, 1958, and with a staff of 30 in place, the hospital, the first of its kind in Philadelphia, began admitting patients the very next day. In the first two years, approximately 57 percent of the care was free.

== Rehabilitation programs ==
=== Spinal Cord Injury ===
Magee Rehabilitation Hospital's spinal cord injury "SCI" program has 4,000 patients and follows up with another 3,500 to 4,000 patients. Magee is partnered with Thomas Jefferson University Hospital to form the Regional Spinal Cord Injury Center of the Delaware Valley. This federally-designated model system of care is one of 14 in the country to provide coordinated lifetime care for people with SCI and their families. Magee's SCI program is also accredited by the Commission on Accreditation of Rehabilitation Facilities (CARF).

Magee's SCI services include a clinical inpatient program; assistive and therapeutic technology, outpatient therapy programs, and community reintegration services. Lifetime follow-up care is coordinated through Magee to address the unique health and community reintegration concerns of people with SCI.

Magee's SCI inpatients' therapies are offered seven days per week, and physician and nursing services are available 24 hours a day. Patients stay at Magee for varying periods of time, based on their goals and progress. Most inpatient stays are complemented by continuing care services at home or in outpatient settings.

All resources and services of Magee Rehabilitation are available through the Lifetime Follow-Up System of Care because people with SCI are likely to have some form of long-term disability and healthcare needs for the remainder of their lives. The program provides patients and families with continued access to rehabilitation physicians and professionals to help patients maintain or regain their level of physical function and good health.

Magee is partnered with the Christopher and Dana Reeve Foundation and the Centers for Disease Control and Prevention (CDC) to offer the NeuroRecovery Network (NRN). The NRN is a part of the Locomotor Training Program, which is activity based therapy.

=== Brain injury ===
Magee's brain injury rehabilitation care system includes:

- Acute Rehabilitation

- Traumatic and non-traumatic admissions
- Post tumor resection rehabilitation
- Dual diagnosis (SCI/TBI) rehabilitation

- Day Rehabilitation
- Outpatient Services
- Vocational Evaluation
- Mild Brain Injury Program
- Medical (Physiatric) Evaluations
- Lifetime Follow-Up
- Peer Mentor Program

The brain injury continuum at Magee provides many services in outpatient settings. Treatments combine technology and pharmacology with hands-on evaluations and therapies. Magee keeps active relationships with other providers, such as vocational agencies and residential programs, to ensure effective and efficient placement in appropriate support programs. Patients with brain injuries receive treatment at the New Wendkos Center for Brain Injury and Stroke.

=== Stroke ===
The Wendkos Center for Brain Injury and Stroke at Magee is led by a stroke program physician, who is a board certified physiatrist (fiz-ee-ah-trist - specialized rehabilitation physician). This physiatrist leads a team of stroke rehabilitation experts including case managers, nurses, occupational therapists, physical therapists, psychologists, recreational therapists, registered dietitians and speech therapists.

The stroke rehabilitation program is customized to fit each patient and family. The stroke rehabilitation team works with the patient and the family to identify goals. Then a patient-specific pathway is mapped out. Magee's Lifetime Follow-Up System of Care provides individuals and families with continued access to a rehabilitation physician and a team of expert rehabilitation professionals, who provide a variety of services to help patients regain or maintain function, including case management for lifetime rehabilitation care.

The Wendkos Community Center for Stroke Survivors provides community based education and activities, servicing the re-entry needs of the stroke survivor and the stroke survivor's caregiver. The center is open to the community.

The Delaware Valley Stroke Council (DVSC) exists to improve services for and treatment of stroke survivors and their families. DVSC fulfills this mission by promoting optimal stroke care through advocacy, education, awareness, diagnosis and treatment.

=== Amputation ===
Program services in amputation rehabilitation at Magee are designed along two tracks, traumatic amputation (accidental severing) and disease-related amputation (diabetes, necrosis). There are also different methods of amputation treatment depending upon whether upper or lower extremities are involved. Services may be delivered in inpatient and/or outpatient programs. Magee's amputation program for amputation care combines technology with traditional, hands-on interventions. The pre-prosthetic phase of treatment includes:

- Strengthening
- Mobility
- Endurance training and preparation for fitting with a temporary prosthesis
- The individual is then fitted with a temporary prosthesis, so that the individual can begin to adjust to the use of the limb, incorporate it into daily living skills and develop tolerance for wearing the limb.

The patient progresses to the outpatient phase when a level of independence is achieved with the temporary limb. Then the patient will be fitted with a permanent prothesis. Magee's follow-up services help patients maintain integrity of their residual limb(s) for the rest of their lives.

Magee also sponsors a peer support group, called AMP-PEER, whose members are available to help new patients before and after their amputations.

=== General Rehabilitation ===
The General Rehab Program at Magee provides comprehensive rehabilitation to individuals with a wide variety of medical, orthopedic and neurologic disorders. Programs are tailored to the needs of individuals with arthritis, cancer, cardiac disease, limb amputation, multiple sclerosis, Parkinson's disease, Guillain–Barré syndrome, status post organ transplantation, and functional decline secondary to prolonged medical illness and neurologic disorders. The General Rehabilitation Program services are available in a variety of settings, including inpatient, outpatient, and Day Rehab.

=== Orthopedic Injury ===
Serious orthopedic problems include multiple bone fractures, joint replacement surgeries, and hip, knee and pelvis fractures. These conditions have lifelong consequences and often result in a short-term disability. Specialized rehabilitation is needed to make sure the affected body parts can operate at their maximum levels of function. The orthopedic rehabilitation program at Magee provides comprehensive rehabilitation to treat the loss of functional ability in patients with a wide variety of conditions that affect the muscles, bones and connective tissues. Inpatient and outpatient programs are offered for arthritis, hip or knee replacement, hip fracture, and multiple fractures. The Magee care team consists of physicians, case managers, nurses, occupational therapists, physical therapists, psychologists, recreational therapists, registered dietitians and speech therapists. Upon admission to the Orthopedic Rehabilitation Program, the care team members work together with patients and families to:

- Establish rehabilitation goals;
- Address current rehabilitation care needs; and
- Plan for lifetime continuing care options

Magee has a Follow-Up System of Care to provide individuals and families with continued access to a rehabilitation physician and a team of expert rehabilitation professionals. This team provides a variety of services to help patients regain or maintain function.

=== Ventilator Services ===
Ventilator services at Magee are designed to increase the independence of SCI survivors whose breathing requires mechanical assistance. The Ventilator Program includes the latest in medicine, allied health, medical and assistive technology, patient education and case management.

The Ventilator Program team works with patients and families in the following areas:

- mobility (using standard or power wheelchair)
- equipment evaluation, selection and ordering
- use of "high-tech" environmental aids
- weaning from ventilator (when appropriate)
- patient-family teaching
- muscle strengthening
- community living skills
- home needs assessment and recommendations
- discharge planning (with appropriate community service referrals)
- psychological wellness

Magee Rehabilitation Hospital also provides therapy for those with multiple sclerosis and Guillain–Barré syndrome.

Magee also offers many outpatient specialty programs including:

- Magee Riverfront Outpatient Center
- Amputee Clinic
- Constraint-induced movement therapy
- Day Rehabilitation
- Functional Capacity Evaluations
- Worksite Analysis Ergonomic Assessment
- Functional Electrical Stimulation
- Lifetime Follow-Up Care
- Locomotor Training - NeuroRecovery Network
- Lymphedema Therapy
- Occupational Health Services/Work Fitness
- Rehab Physician Evaluation
- Vestibular Rehab

== Peer mentors ==
Spinal Cord Injury Support provides SCI patients with support from peers, a resource group, and a family peer group. The SCI-Peer Consultant Group provides individuals who have suffered a SCI the chance to learn from those who have rehabilitated following such an injury. The resource group provides education, recreation and support opportunities to individuals with spinal cord injuries. Family Peer Mentors are family members and/or loved ones of individuals who have sustained a SCI and have successfully transitioned to living life with a disability. They are volunteers who are specially trained to guide and provide SCI related information and experiences to families and loved ones of newly injured individuals.

Stroke Support provides support to stroke survivors and their families. Support is provided through one-on-one contact with specially trained survivors and family members who have experienced the disability themselves or experienced the disability of a loved one. They share their experiences and provide insight to others who are in similar situations. Both inpatient and outpatient support groups are available. The Stroke Club is another group for those who have had strokes to share their experiences.

The Aphasia Group provides an opportunity to practice speech and language skills, provides education about aphasia, and encourages socialization among the members. This group is open to individuals who have aphasia and/or their family members.

Brain Injury Support is provided through one-on-one contact with specially trained survivors and family members who have experienced the disability themselves or experienced the disability of a loved one. They share their experiences and provide insight to others who are in similar situations. Both inpatient and outpatient services are available. Current inpatients meet once a week as part of their rehabilitation and a family caregiver group meets monthly.

Amputee Support is available both before and after amputation occurs. Peer mentors provide emotional support and practical information on everyday concerns. "AmpPeers" share their experiences and knowledge and are living proof that amputees can recover and maintain active lifestyles.

The RISE Program, or "Renew Interests and Skills through Education," is for people with aphasia who have completed rehabilitation and therapy and now face the challenges of communication and participating in activities. Classes are designed to develop and improve personal skills, provide new interests for participants, and share experiences with other people with aphasia.

== Recreation and sports ==
In order to support the local community of individuals with disabilities, Magee Rehabilitation Hospital offers wheelchair sports programs. The goal of the program is to help people with disabilities reach for personal health and wellness goals. Magee athletes have competed at the regional, national, and international levels, including the Paralympic Games. Magee supported athletes can compete in wheelchair basketball, wheelchair rugby, wheelchair tennis, and power soccer. Magee also sponsors four annual competitions.

Magee Rehabilitation Hospital is partnered with Life Rolls On, a nonprofit organization that serves as a resource and advocate for young people whose lives have been affected by spinal cord injury. Life Rolls On utilizes action sports to push the boundary of possibility for those with spinal cord injuries. "They Will Surf Again" is the flagship program of Life Rolls On and Magee's wheelchair sports program has participated in a surfing event with them, getting the patients into the ocean and surfing with the help of volunteers and special adaptive surfing equipment. In 2010, Magee Rehabilitation Hospital and Life Rolls On appeared on ABC's Perspective New Jersey talk show.

Magee Rehabilitation Hospital is also partnered with Able Flight. Magee's wheelchair sports program partnered with Able Flight and its local partner Philly Sport Pilot and participated in an adapted flying demonstration. Philly Sport Pilot specializes in disabled pilot training and light-sport aircraft and was created by a former Magee Rehabilitation Hospital Patient in 2007. Philly Sport Pilot's mission is to provide inclusive flight training to anyone wishing to learn, regardless of disabilities they may have. Magee wheelchair athletes have received introductory flight lessons and have taken to the air with an instructor as part of these partnerships.

Horticultural Therapy benefits rehabilitation patients by increasing strength through watering and lifting soil/potting materials, using different sized pots and various sized plants. Horticultural therapy uses plants, gardens, nature crafts, and gardening activities. Aspects of movement that can be improved with this type of therapy include range of motion, balance and standing endurance, bilateral integration, fine motor skills, sensory stimulation, and cognitive sequencing tools. Horticultural Therapy provides emotional and psychological benefits to patients with spinal cord injuries, brain injuries, strokes, and amputations. Horticulture activities aid in the process of reintegration back into the community.

Art Therapy at Magee includes painting, drawing, sculpture, and clay modeling, among other forms of art therapy. The focus of art therapy within a physical rehabilitation hospital is to work with individuals through creating artwork as an addition to existing care, in an effort to further promote successful rehabilitation. Art therapy is a mental health profession that uses the creative process of art making to improve and enhance the physical, mental and emotional well-being of individuals of all ages. Art therapy integrates the fields of human development, visual art (drawing, painting, sculpture, and other art forms), and the creative process with models of counseling and psychotherapy. Art therapy is used to assess and treat anxiety, depression, social and emotional difficulties related to disability and illness; trauma and loss; physical, cognitive and neurological problems. Art therapy services at Magee include individual and group therapy sessions as well as sessions working together with occupational, physical, speech, and recreational therapies.

== Health features and education ==
Wheelchair Training Video- In order to help Iraqi citizens learn to properly use wheelchairs, Magee created a Wheelchair Training Video, posters, and brochures for the US Army. The materials cover transfers, elevations, pressure relief, and basic wheelchair assessment. The materials are produced in both English and Arabic.

The Annual Dr. Guy Fried Educational Seminar was started by former patient Edna Tuttleman and her husband Stan. Both appreciated the care at Magee and the service of Dr. Fried and the medical team. As a way to honor Dr. Fried and support medical education, they have funded the seminar for many years. Topics in the past have included traumatic brain injury and Magee's spinal cord and stroke programs. The seminar features national and internationally known presenters.

== Fundraising ==
Magee Rehabilitation Hospital holds a fundraiser called the Jerry Segal Classic Golf Outing every year. Jerry Segal came to Magee Rehabilitation Hospital with quadriplegia in 1988. After months of intense therapy, he was able to walk out of Magee on his own. Right then and there he made two vows; The first was to play golf again and the second was to help other Magee patients experience the same kind of success he did. He has been doing both ever since. The fundraiser is a golf tournament complete with dinner and an auction. The first Segal Classic event took place in October 1990 and has raised more than $14.5 million in 26 years to benefit the patients at Magee. The next Annual Segal Classic was held on September 23, 2016.

Proceeds raised by the Segal Classic through golfing, sponsorships and the live and silent auctions benefit individuals with disabilities at Magee by:

- Providing food and lodging to patients' families and loved ones so they can be close by during the therapy and rehabilitation process
- Funding peer mentoring programs for those who are learning to live with the aftermaths of a stroke or spinal cord injury
- Funding new, state-of-the-art equipment such as ReoTherapy and Locomotor training
- Funding patient and family recreation activities

Another of Magee Rehabilitation Hospital's annual fundraisers is the Night of Champions event. The fundraiser benefits Magee's wheelchair sports programs. The event features dinner, auctions, and raffles. Some of the prizes offered in the past have included autographed sports memorabilia, exclusive gifts, restaurant certificates, getaway weekends, and travel packages. The event also features a variety of local sports celebrities each year and presents an award called "Champion in the Community." Some celebrities who have attended in the past include Eagle Winston Justice, Sixers general manager Ed Stefanski, NBA Hall of Famer Billy Cunningham, former Eagle and current Jersey Congressional candidate Jon Runyan, former Penn State football player Adam Taliaferro, Temple basketball coach Fran Dunphy, former Eagle Mike Mamula, former sportscaster and current Phillies Director of Public Affairs Scott Palmer, radio personality Joe Conklin, Philadelphia Kixx defender Pat Morris, former Eagle Jon Harris and former Flyer Brian Propp.

The third annual fundraiser Magee Rehabilitation holds is the Humanitarian Award Dinner. The Magee Rehabilitation Hospital Humanitarian Award recognizes those who contribute positively to the role of healthcare and/or the lives of individuals with disabilities in the Philadelphia region. Numerous individuals are reviewed each year by a selection committee. Past winners of the award include Philadelphia notables Martie Gillin, Lynne Abraham, Joseph Frick, John Dougherty, and Jerry & Carolyn Segal. This award has been given every November since 1988. The 23rd Annual Humanitarian Award Dinner will be held on November 16, 2010. The fundraiser has raised over $2 million throughout the years.
