= Jeff Boss =

American politician

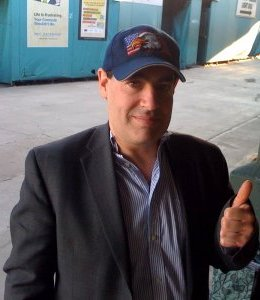
- Boss in 2009
- Born: Jeffrey Harlan Boss; May 20, 1963 (age 63); New Jersey, U.S.
- Known for: Various conspiracy theories such as 9/11 Truth

Jeffrey Harlan Boss (born May 20, 1963) is an American conspiracy theorist and perennial candidate. He was an independent candidate for President of the United States in the 2008 and 2012 elections, a Democratic candidate in the 2016 election, and the 2020 election.

== Electoral history ==
In 2008, he was an independent candidate for President of the United States as well as a candidate for the U.S. Senate in New Jersey, running under the slogan "Vote Here". He received 639 votes as a presidential candidate and 9,877 in his Senate run.

In 2009, Boss was a candidate for the Democratic Party's nomination for Governor of New Jersey. He finished third, with 8.3% of the vote, in the primary which was won by Jon Corzine, who received 77.2% of the vote.

In the 2012 election, Boss received 1,024 votes for President of the United States.

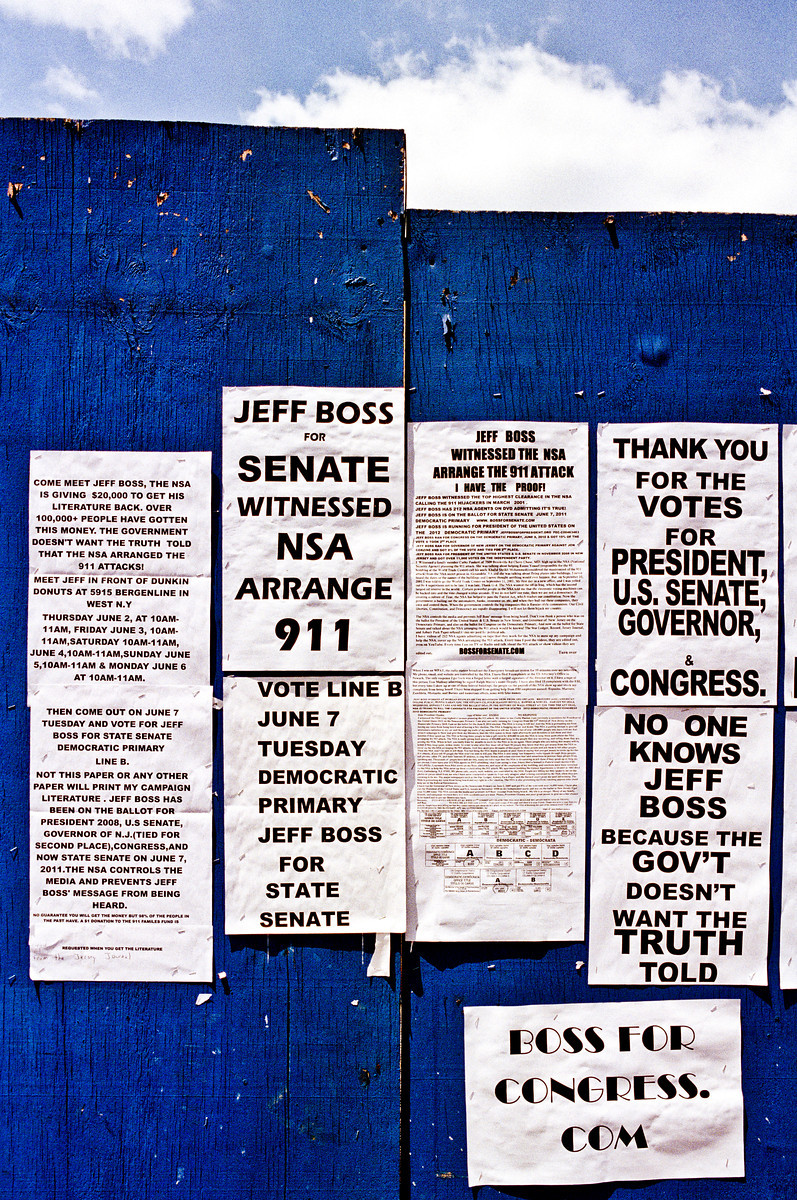
Jeff Boss campaign literature, posted on a wall on 9th Avenue in Manhattan.

He ran for the Democratic nomination for Governor of New Jersey in 2013, but was removed from the ballot after the New Jersey Democratic State Committee challenged the nominating petitions of all independent candidates seeking the Democratic nomination. He subsequently filed new petitions to run for governor in the general election and appeared on the ballot as the "NSA Did 911" candidate. Out of the eight candidates, Boss finished last, with 0.1% of the vote.

In 2014, Boss ran for the U.S. Senate in New Jersey as an independent. His slogans were "NSA Whistleblower" and "NSA Did 911". He received 4,513 votes (0.24% of the vote)

== Conspiracy theories ==
Boss believes that the United States government, specifically the National Security Agency, was responsible for the September 11 attacks. He claims to have witnessed the government arrange the attacks.

== See also ==
- Henry B. Krajewski
- Ed Forchion
