= Reginald Jackson (bishop) =

African Methodist Episcopal bishop (1951–2025)

Reginald Thomas Jackson (April 26, 1954 – November 25, 2025) was an American pastor and bishop. He was the 132nd elected and consecrated bishop of the African Methodist Episcopal Church.

== Early life and education ==
Reginald Thomas Jackson was born in Dover, Delaware, to Charles and Lillian (née Bowers) Jackson on April 26, 1954. Jackson had three brothers. His father worked as a driver at the local Delaware State College and his mother in food services at Wesley College. The college, a state-assisted but privately governed historically black college, became Delaware State University in 1993. Wesley College merged with the university in 2021.

Jackson received a bachelor's degree in history and political science from Delaware State College in 1976. In 1979, he graduated from Turner Seminary at the Interdenominational Theological Center (Atlanta, Georgia) with a Master of Divinity.

== Pastoral ministry ==
Jackson was assigned as the pastor of St. John AME Church, Jersey City, New Jersey, in 1979 and shortly thereafter, St. Matthew AME Church, Orange, New Jersey, in 1981. Under his ministry more than 3,000 people accepted Christ or joined the church.

As pastor of St. Matthew AME, the church developed more than thirty ministries that minister to the spiritual, emotional, educational, physical and financial needs of the church and community. Church ministries and administration are supported by a budget that has grown from $50,000 to almost $2,000,000. Because of the church's growth a new edifice was built in 1985 and a second larger edifice in 2002. Known as "The Servant Church of the Oranges", its doors are opened seven days a week and are a center of activity for church and community.

== Episcopal ministry ==
The Rt. Rev. Reginald T. Jackson was elected and consecrated as the 132nd bishop in the A.M.E. Church in 2012 at the 49th Quadrennial Session General Conference in Nashville, Tennessee. He was elected out of his home Episcopal District (The First Episcopal District) and he stood on the platform: "Imagine the Church at Its Best" and "Strengthen Local Churches!" At the time of his death, he was the Bishop and Presiding Prelate of the 2nd Episcopal District, consisting of Washington, D.C., Maryland, Virginia, and North Carolina.

== Community impact ==
In addition to his pastoral and connectional church responsibilities, Jackson served as the executive director of the Black Ministers Council (BMC) of New Jersey, which represents more than 600 African American churches in the State of New Jersey. As executive director of the BMC, he was outspoken on almost every major issue in the state, pressuring the state to increase funding for poor (Abbott) school districts leading to the State Supreme Court to order New Jersey to spend more than eight billion dollars to achieve parity in spending, adequate funding for charity care for those who are uninsured, legislation to end predatory lending targeting minorities and seniors and development of the urban areas of the state. He was best known, however, for his leadership in the fight against racial profiling and reform of the New Jersey State Police which resulted in New Jersey passing legislation and signed by the governor making racial profiling a crime.

== Affiliations and awards ==
Jackson served on numerous boards. He was the chairman of the board of trustees of Essex County College, (Newark, New Jersey), member and onetime president of the board of education of the Orange Public Schools (Orange, New Jersey), member of the board of New Brunswick Theological Seminary (New Brunswick, New Jersey), member of the board of Barnabas Health and a life member of the NAACP. He was also a member of Phi Beta Sigma fraternity.

He received hundreds of awards, including being named the Man of the Year in 2000 by New Jersey Monthly magazine, the recipient of the William Ashby Award by the United Way, the Martin Luther King Award by the Newark North Ward Center. Jackson has been named repeatedly among the 25 most influential people in New Jersey.

== Death ==
Jackson died on November 25, 2025, at the age of 71. Jackson was the husband of attorney Christy Davis-Jackson and the father of two children.
