= Edward Durr =

New Jersey state senator

Ed Durr

Member of the New Jersey Senate from the 3rd district
- In office January 11, 2022 – January 9, 2024
- Preceded by: Stephen Sweeney
- Succeeded by: John Burzichelli

Personal details
- Born: July 18, 1963 (age 63) New Jersey, U.S.
- Party: Republican
- Spouse: Lynn Durr
- Children: 3
- Website: Official website

Edward R. Durr Jr. (born July 18, 1963) is an American politician and truck driver who served in the New Jersey Senate from 2022 to 2024, representing the 3rd Legislative district. A member of the Republican Party, he was elected in 2021 against incumbent Democratic State Senate President Stephen Sweeney in a major upset. Durr lost re-election in 2023 to Democrat John Burzichelli, a former Assemblyman.

== Early life ==
Durr was born July 18, 1963, and was raised in Gloucester City, New Jersey, where he attended Gloucester City Junior-Senior High School.

== Political career ==
=== 2021 State Senate election ===
Before running for State Senate in 2021, Durr ran unsuccessfully for a seat in the New Jersey General Assembly in 2017 and 2019.

Durr ran for New Jersey State Senate as a Republican in 2021. He challenged incumbent Democratic Senate President Stephen Sweeney in New Jersey's 3rd Legislative District. At the time, Sweeney was the longest-serving Senate president in the history of New Jersey. Durr stated that being denied a concealed carry permit despite having a clean record motivated him to run for State Senate. While it was reported that Durr spent only $153 on his campaign, that was the amount he spent in the unopposed Republican primary, not the general election. Over the course of his general campaign, Durr spent approximately $2,300, while Sweeney spent approximately $305,000. Durr's campaign video was taken using a cell phone.

In a massive political upset, Durr defeated Sweeney on Election Day by a margin of 51.7%-48.3%. Durr's defeat of Sweeney made headlines in The New York Times, The Washington Post, and USA Today. On Election Day, Durr commented, "It didn't happen because of me. I'm nobody. I'm absolutely nobody. I'm just a simple guy. It was the people. It was a repudiation of the policies that have been forced down their throats". He also mentioned how he often joked that he was going to "shock the world" by winning the election, but later stated that he never truly thought it would happen.

=== Controversial statements ===
Following his victory, past social media posts made by Durr created controversy. The posts related to topics such as vaccine mandates, the January 6 Capitol attack, Vice President Kamala Harris, and Islam. He apologized for the comments, stating, "I'm a passionate guy and I sometimes say things in the heat of the moment. If I said things in the past that hurt anybody's feelings, I sincerely apologize".

In 2019, Durr tweeted that "Islam is a false religion" and added that "Mohammed was a pedophile!" Muslim advocacy groups called on him to repudiate the tweet. Durr later met with local Muslim leaders and declared his opposition to "Islamophobia and all forms of hate."

=== 2023 State Senate election ===
In the June 2023 Republican primary, Assemblywoman Beth Sawyer ran against Durr for the 3rd district seat in the Senate. Sawyer’s decision to run was rooted in growing concern over Durr’s inflammatory rhetoric and lack of legislative accomplishments. His widely criticized comments targeting women, Muslims, and racial minorities had ignited intense backlash within the New Jersey Republican Party and across the state’s political landscape.

Sawyer argued that Durr was unelectable in a general election and that his continued presence on the ballot would jeopardize Republican competitiveness in a key swing district.

Despite Sawyer’s warnings, Durr won the Republican primary by a 65–35% margin, carrying all 38 municipalities in the district. The deep-red character of this part of South Jersey likely played a significant role in the outcome, as Durr’s incendiary rhetoric resonated with a segment of the Republican base. His re-election campaign was endorsed by Arkansas U.S. Senator Tom Cotton.

However, Sawyer’s projections proved prescient. Heading into the general election, Durr’s seat was considered one of the most competitive races in the state. He faced former Assemblyman John Burzichelli, a seasoned Democrat, in a bitter and high-profile campaign marked by mutual attacks. South Jersey Democrats mounted a coordinated effort to reclaim the seat, and Durr ultimately lost to Burzichelli.

=== 2025 gubernatorial election ===
On June 24, 2024, Durr announced his candidacy for the Republican nomination for Governor of New Jersey. Durr withdrew from the race on March 25, 2025 after failing to gain the required amount of eligible signatures needed to make the ballot, or the funding he needed to qualify for matching funds from the State and continue participating in debates. After dropping out of the race, Durr endorsed Bill Spadea.

== Political positions ==
=== Taxes ===
Durr has advocated for cutting income taxes, corporate taxes, and other state taxes, as well as reducing property taxes. He describes himself as a "constitutional conservative".

=== Gun policy ===
Durr was endorsed by the NRA and given A+ rating. Durr is a strong supporter of the Second Amendment and supports expanding gun rights.

=== Gay rights ===
In 2022, Durr introduced a bill that would have barred teachers in kindergarten through sixth grade from engaging in instruction on matters of gender identity and sexual orientation. The bill had no senate cosponsors.

== Personal life ==
Durr lives with his wife Lynn in the Repaupo section of Logan Township. He has three children; Heather, Melissa, and Edward III, who ran for Councilman of Logan Township in 2024. He also has six grandchildren. He is a truck driver for Raymour & Flanigan.

== Electoral history ==
3rd Legislative District General Election, 2023
Party	Candidate	Votes	%
Democratic	John J. Burzichelli	32,382	53.61
Republican	Edward Durr (incumbent)	28,018	46.39
Total votes		60,400	100.00
Democratic gain from Republican			

New Jersey State Senate election, 2021
Party	Candidate	Votes	%
Republican	Edward Durr	33,761	51.68
Democratic	Stephen M. Sweeney (incumbent)	31,562	48.32
Total votes		65,323	100.00
Republican gain from Democratic			
