= Stephen Sweeney =

114th President of the New Jersey Senate

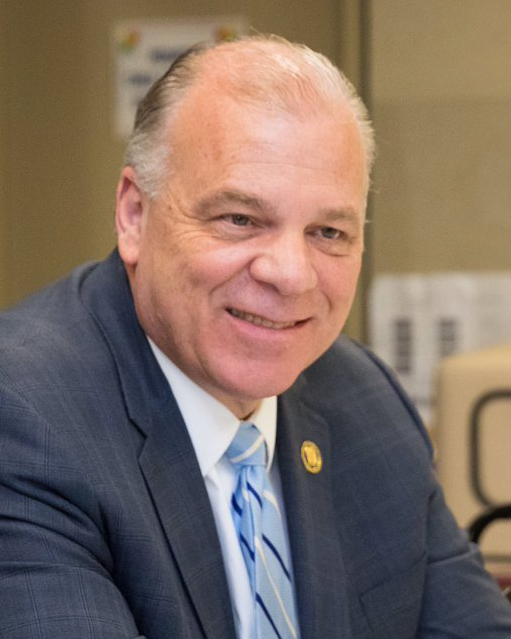
- Sweeney in 2017

114th President of the New Jersey Senate
- In office January 12, 2010 – January 11, 2022
- Preceded by: Richard Codey
- Succeeded by: Nicholas Scutari

Majority Leader of the New Jersey Senate
- In office January 8, 2008 – January 12, 2010
- Preceded by: Bernard Kenny
- Succeeded by: Barbara Buono

Member of the New Jersey Senate from the 3rd district
- In office January 8, 2002 – January 11, 2022
- Preceded by: Raymond Zane
- Succeeded by: Edward Durr

Personal details
- Born: June 11, 1959 (age 67) Camden, New Jersey, U.S.
- Party: Democratic
- Spouse: Patti Sweeney
- Children: 2
- Website: State Senate website Campaign website

Stephen M. Sweeney (born June 11, 1959) is an American politician and labor leader who served in the New Jersey Senate from 2002 to 2022, representing the 3rd legislative district. A member of the Democratic Party, he was the 114th President of the New Jersey Senate from 2010 to 2022.

A Union Ironworker by trade, Sweeney was frequently described as a political power broker in New Jersey politics and identifies as a moderate and a fiscal conservative. His legislative tenure ended after he was defeated in 2021 by Republican Edward Durr in a major upset. Following his defeat, Sweeney announced his candidacy in the 2025 New Jersey gubernatorial election, placing last in the June primary.

== Early life ==
Sweeney was born in Camden, New Jersey, and graduated from Pennsauken High School in 1977. He is of Irish ancestry. He joined Ironworkers Local 399 (of Camden, New Jersey) and gained journeyman status on January 1, 1980.

== Career ==
=== Gloucester County Commissioner ===
Sweeney served on the Gloucester County Board of County Commissioners, a post he held since 1997, and served as the Director of the board from January 6, 2006, until he left office in 2010. During that period of time he simultaneously held a seat in the New Jersey Senate and was a Freeholder, a practice known as "double dipping" that was allowed under a grandfather clause in a 2007 state law that prevents dual-office-holding but allows those who had held both positions as of February 1, 2008, to retain both posts.

=== New Jersey Senate ===
Sweeney sponsored a 2002 law allowing municipalities and other public entities beginning a construction project to enter into a Project Labor Agreement (PLA), an agreement that establishes the terms and conditions of employment and prohibits the use of strikes and lockouts, which can save money by reducing cost overruns and work stoppages, and contribute to decreased labor unrest. A 2005 law Sweeney sponsored enabled the Delaware River and Bay Authority to establish an ethanol plant in Southern New Jersey, the first of its kind in any of the Mid-Atlantic states, a project intended to create jobs for South Jersey and supply a new market for farmers in the region. In response to heightened security warnings around potential targets such as chemical and nuclear plants since the September 11 terrorist attacks that destroyed the World Trade Center, Sweeney pushed to require potentially vulnerable facilities to implement security standards and to explore possible safer technologies. He sponsored legislation to allow security guards at nuclear plants to carry assault weapons and high-powered ammunition. The bill, which was signed into law in September 2003, requires guards to undergo mandated training in the use of the firearms before getting access to the weapons.

Other legislation sponsored by Sweeney and signed into law provides state pensions to surviving family members of police, firefighters and emergency services workers who die in the line of duty, as well as the law that removes the remarriage prohibition to receive death benefits for spouses of police officers and firefighters killed while serving the public good. Sweeney also co-sponsored the law providing health benefits to New Jersey National Guard members who serve for 30 days or more on state active duty.

Sweeney sponsored "Maggie's Law", which establishes driving while seriously fatigued as a form of driver recklessness. The first law of its kind in the United States, "Maggie's Law" was signed by Governor Jim McGreevey in August 2003. It subjects sleep deprived drivers who have been awake for 24 hours or more to sentences of up to 10 years in jail and fines up to $150,000 if they get into fatal car accidents caused by their lack of sleep. Sweeney first pursued the legislation when he was contacted by the mother of Maggie McDonnell, a Washington Township resident who was killed in a car accident by a driver who had been up for over 30 hours without sleeping.

On June 1, 2006, Sweeney and two Assembly Democrats, Paul D. Moriarty (D, 4th legislative district) and Jerry Green (D, 22nd legislative district), announced their support for cuts of as much as 15% to New Jersey state worker salaries and benefits as part of an effort to avoid a one-point increase in the state's sales tax proposed by Governor Jon Corzine. He urged that workers affected by the state shutdown in July 2006 should not collect pay for the time they were furloughed, stating that he would have voted to reject the state budget if he had known that state workers would receive pay for a period when they were not working.

Sweeney was selected by the Senate Democratic Caucus to serve as Majority Leader on November 8, 2007.

In December 2016, Sweeney was one of several Catholic elected officials who supported legislation legalizing assisted suicide, saying that state residents should be able to make their own decisions on a topic in which "the church takes positions that are not necessarily mainstream".

==== Committees ====
- Joint Budget Oversight
- Budget and Appropriations
- Legislative Services Commission

==== Senate Presidency ====
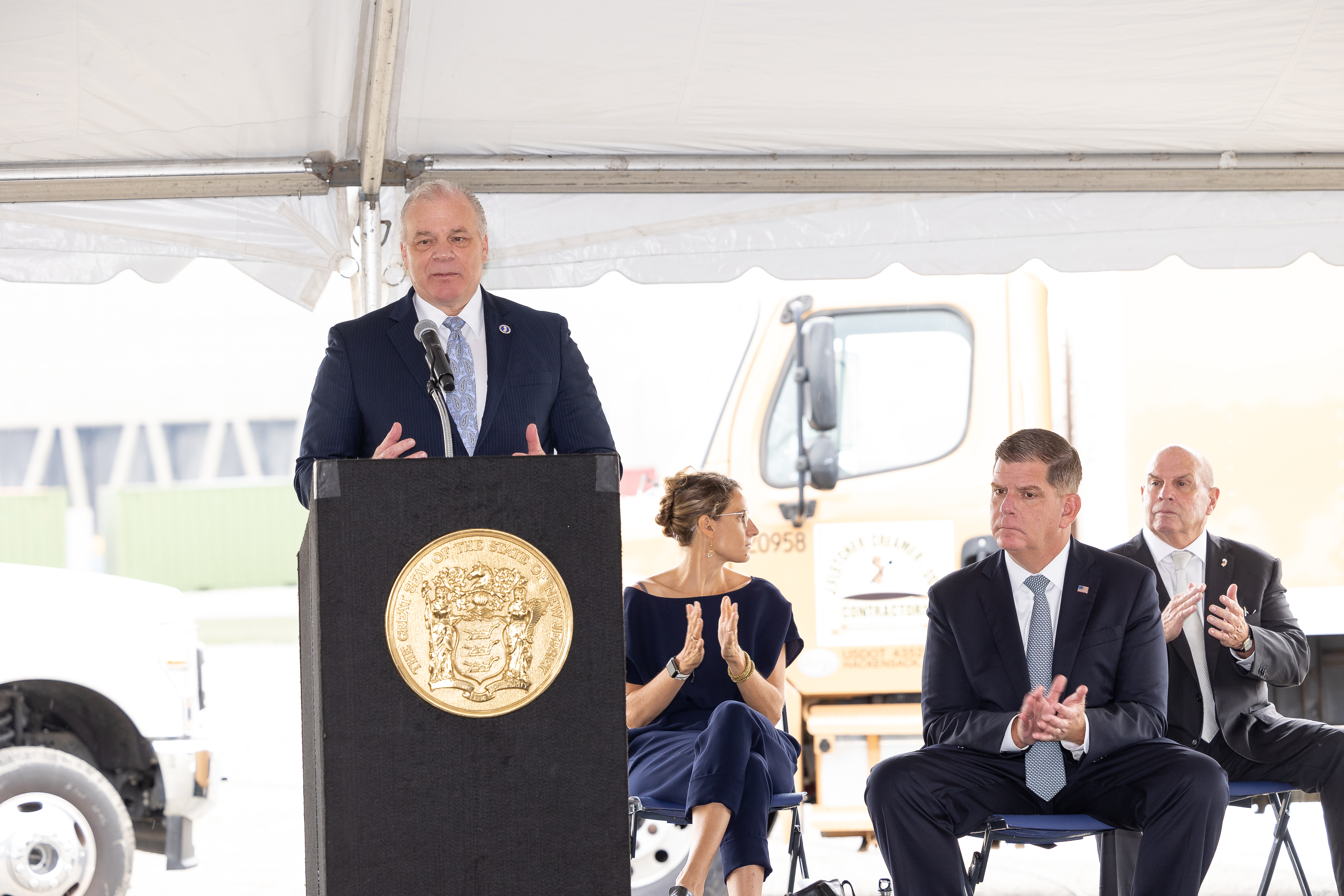
Sweeney with U.S. Secretary of Labor Marty Walsh at the New Jersey Wind Port groundbreaking ceremony on July 22, 2021, in Hancocks Bridge, New Jersey.

On the afternoon of November 23, 2009, New Jersey Senate Democrats chose Sweeney as State Senate President over the incumbent, former governor Richard Codey. He took office on January 12, 2010. In the absence of the governor and lieutenant governor, Sweeney served as acting governor of New Jersey during the eastern seaboard storm of December 2010.

In January 2010, Sweeney abstained when the New Jersey Senate voted on the question of allowing same-sex couples to marry. The bill was not passed. Sweeney later called his abstention a mistake and said that the issue was a civil rights issue, not a religious issue. In 2012, Sweeney was one of the prime sponsors of legislation that would legalize same-sex marriage. The bill was approved in both houses of the Legislature, but was ultimately vetoed by Governor Chris Christie; Christie favored putting the issue up for public referendum.

In 2010, Sweeney helped design and pass thirty bills, known collectively as "Back to Work NJ," that aimed to help create jobs and economic growth in New Jersey. In 2011, Sweeney proposed sweeping reforms to the public employee pension and health benefits systems that he estimates would save taxpayers over $120 billion over a 30-year period. Sweeney also helped craft the state's two-percent property tax cap in order to control rising property taxes. Sweeney was named as a "Politician Who's Ahead of the Curve" by Philadelphia Magazine in 2011 for his continued support of shared services between local government units.

With Republican Thomas Kean, Jr. and fellow Democrat Raymond Lesniak, Sweeney sponsored Senate Bill S2664, the "Market Competition and Consumer Choice Act" in 2011, which Verizon said would encourage the firm to create additional jobs in the state.

Following Governor Christie's use of the line item veto on the state's 2011 budget, Sweeney was quoted by The Star-Ledger as being "incensed". Two days later, Sweeney was unapologetic about what The Star-Ledger described as a "tirade" against Christie, saying "[...] I don't apologize for it. The governor was wrong to hurt people", in response to further questions about the earlier reports which quoted him as describing Christie as a "rotten bastard", a "punk", and "Mr. Potter from It's a Wonderful Life." Christie had cut funding for tax credits and health care for the working poor, women's health funding, AIDS medication funding, and mental health services. In January 2013, two months after Hurricane Sandy hit New Jersey, Sweeney suggested that Governor Christie "got lucky" because the hurricane had distracted voters from New Jersey's slow economic recovery, an issue that many political observers believed was a potential point of weakness for Christie. He was heavily criticized for his remark, and a spokesman for Christie called it "politics at its worst".

During Christie's tenure as Governor, Sweeney was the lead advocate of legislation to raise taxes on millionaires. Christie vetoed such legislation on five occasions. After Democrat Phil Murphy became Governor, Democrats backed off the legislation, with Sweeney saying, "This state is taxed out. If you know anything about New Jersey, they're just weary of the taxes."

In December 2018, Sweeney led efforts to change the New Jersey constitution so that it entrenched the gerrymandering of New Jersey districts. The efforts were condemned by national Democrats such as former Attorney General Eric Holder, as well as by New Jersey governor Phil Murphy.

Before New Jersey's 2010 creation of the Lieutenant Governor position, Sweeney often served as New Jersey's Acting Governor by virtue of his position as Senate President. As a presiding officer, Sweeney has received protection from the New Jersey State Police's Executive Protection Unit.

==== 2015 recall effort by pro-gun activists ====
In March 2015, a group of pro-gun activists began pushing for a recall of Sweeney. The organization, known as 'Recall Steve Sweeney', was led by the New Jersey Second Amendment Society which expressed displeasure with Sweeney's record on gun control legislation. The group's first attempt at filing petitions in March was denied by the state for lacking additional certifications; a second attempt began shortly thereafter. For a recall election to occur, the group had to collect valid signatures from 25% of the 3rd district's registered voters, or 34,808 signatures, in 160 days. The threshold was not met by the deadline, thus ending the recall effort for a second time.

==== Awards and recognition ====
Sweeney was frequently cited as the most powerful elected Democrat in New Jersey. Sweeney was ranked #4 by NJBIZ in their 2015 "Power 100" rankings of the most influential people statewide, and was ranked #4 by PolitickerNJ in their most recent annual ranking of the state's most powerful elected officials. Institutional Investor Magazine ranked Sweeney #12 nationwide on their "2017 Political Pension Power 25" list, ahead of figures such as financier Paul Singer and AFL-CIO President Richard Trumka. In March 2022, Rowan University announced the formation of the Steve Sweeney Center for Public Policy in their College of Humanities & Social Sciences.

Sweeney's awards include the Outstanding State Legislator Award from the NJ Veterans of Foreign Wars and the "Legislator of the Year" Award from the New Jersey State Chamber of Commerce (2011).

=== 2025 gubernatorial campaign ===
On December 11, 2023, Sweeney launched his campaign to succeed term-limited Governor Phil Murphy in the 2025 New Jersey gubernatorial election. He was the second major candidate to declare for the Democratic Party nomination after Jersey City Mayor Steven Fulop. Sean Spiller, Josh Gottheimer, Mikie Sherrill are other Democrats who are also running for Governor of New Jersey in 2025. Sweeney was previously considered a contender for governor in the 2013 and 2017 elections, ultimately deciding against running on both occasions.

== Personal life ==
Sweeney and his wife, Patti, were married in 1986. They live in West Deptford Township, New Jersey, and have two children.

== Electoral history ==
=== 2021 ===
In 2021, Sweeney was defeated in a massive upset by Edward Durr, a Republican truck driver who had never held elected office. Durr spent less than $2,300 on his campaign, while Sweeney spent approximately $305,000.

New Jersey State Senate election, 2021
Party	Candidate	Votes	%
Republican	Edward Durr	33,761	51.7%
Democratic	Stephen M. Sweeney (incumbent)	31,562	48.3%
Republican gain from Democratic			

=== 2017 ===
Sweeney was widely viewed as a top contender for the 2017 gubernatorial election to succeed Governor Chris Christie. On October 6, 2016, however, Sweeney announced that he would not seek the Democratic nomination for governor in 2017.

Sweeney won re-election to a sixth term in 2017, defeating Salem County Republican Chairman Fran Grenier in the largest electoral victory of his career (59%–41%). As of 2017, the election was one of the most expensive state legislative races in U.S. history. Due to prior conflicts with Sweeney, the New Jersey Education Association, which typically backs Democratic candidates, controversially endorsed Grenier and spent millions of dollars in attack ads against Sweeney.

New Jersey State Senate elections, 2017
Party	Candidate	Votes	%
Democratic	Stephen M. Sweeney (incumbent)	31,541	59
Republican	Fran Grenier	22,204	41
Democratic hold			

=== 2013 ===
In the state's most expensive Senate race of the 2013 cycle, Sweeney defeated Republican attorney Niki Trunk 55%–45%

New Jersey State Senate elections, 2013
Party	Candidate	Votes	%
Democratic	Stephen M. Sweeney (incumbent)	31,045	54.8
Republican	Niki A. Trunk	25,599	45.2
Democratic hold			

=== 2011 ===
Sweeney won re-election to a fourth term defeating Michael Mulligan 56%–44%.

New Jersey State Senate elections, 2011
Party	Candidate	Votes	%
Democratic	Stephen M. Sweeney (incumbent)	25,299	55.6
Republican	Michael M. Mulligan	20,197	44.4
Democratic hold			

=== 2007 ===
Sweeney won re-election to a third term defeating Mark Cimino 57%–40%.

New Jersey State Senate elections, 2007
Party	Candidate	Votes	%
Democratic	Stephen M. Sweeney (incumbent)	29,908	59.2
Republican	Mark Cimino	20,645	40.8
Democratic hold			

=== 2003 ===
Sweeney won re-election to a second term defeating Phillip Rhudy 54%–45%.

New Jersey general election, 2003
Party	Candidate	Votes	%	±%
Democratic	Stephen M. Sweeney	29,051	54.0	▲2.5
Republican	Phillip S. Rhudy	24,698	46.0	▼2.5
Total votes		53,749	100.0	

=== 2001 ===
Then Freeholder Sweeney defeated eight-term Republican State Senator Raymond Zane 51%–49%. The race was the most expensive legislative race in New Jersey history at the time, totaling $2.4 million, with Sweeney spending an individual record $1.8 million to triple Zane's spending of $624,000. The record stood until 2003, when $4 million was spent in Fred H. Madden's successful race to unseat George Geist.

New Jersey general election, 2001
Party	Candidate	Votes	%
Democratic	Stephen M. Sweeney	29,873	51.5
Republican	Raymond J. Zane	28,138	48.5
Total votes		58,011	100.0

New Jersey Senate
Preceded by Raymond Zane	Member of the New Jersey Senate from the 3rd district 2002–2022	Succeeded by Edward Durr
Preceded by Bernard Kenny	Majority Leader of the New Jersey Senate; 2008–2010	Succeeded by Barbara Buono
Political offices
Preceded by Richard Codey	President of the New Jersey Senate; 2010–2022	Succeeded by Nicholas Scutari
