= New Jersey state senate delegations =

Members of the New Jersey Senate representing the 1st through 6th legislative districts are listed below by legislative session from 1974 to 2014, together with their political party affiliations.

== Delegations ==
Session	1st	2nd	3rd	4th	5th	6th
1974–1976	James Cafiero (R)	Joseph L. McGahn (D)	Raymond Zane (D)	Joseph A. Maressa (D)	John J. Horn (D)	Alene S. Ammond (D)
1976–1978	James Cafiero (R)	Joseph L. McGahn (D)	Raymond Zane (D)	Joseph A. Maressa (D)	John J. Horn (D)	Alene S. Ammond (D)
1978–1980	James Cafiero (R)	Steven P. Perskie (D)	Raymond Zane (D)	Joseph A. Maressa (D)	Angelo Errichetti (D)	Lee B. Laskin (R)
1980–1982	James Cafiero (R)	Steven P. Perskie (D)	Raymond Zane (D)	Joseph A. Maressa (D)	Angelo Errichetti (D)	Lee B. Laskin (R)
1982–1984	James R. Hurley (R)	Steven P. Perskie (D)	Raymond Zane (D)	Daniel J. Dalton (D)	Walter Rand (D)	Lee B. Laskin (R)
1982–1984	James R. Hurley (R)	William Gormley (R)	Raymond Zane (D)	Daniel J. Dalton (D)	Walter Rand (D)	Lee B. Laskin (R)
1984–1986	James R. Hurley (R)	William Gormley (R)	Raymond Zane (D)	Daniel J. Dalton (D)	Walter Rand (D)	Lee B. Laskin (R)
1986–1988	James R. Hurley (R)	William Gormley (R)	Raymond Zane (D)	Daniel J. Dalton (D)	Walter Rand (D)	Lee B. Laskin (R)
1988–1990	James R. Hurley (R)	William Gormley (R)	Raymond Zane (D)	Daniel J. Dalton (D)	Walter Rand (D)	Lee B. Laskin (R)
1990–1992	James R. Hurley (R)	William Gormley (R)	Raymond Zane (D)	Daniel J. Dalton (D)	Walter Rand (D)	Lee B. Laskin (R)
1990–1992	James Cafiero (R)	William Gormley (R)	Raymond Zane (D)	Daniel J. Dalton (D)	Walter Rand (D)	Lee B. Laskin (R)
1992–1994	James Cafiero (R)	William Gormley (R)	Raymond Zane (D)	John Matheussen (R)	Walter Rand (D)	John Adler (D)
1994–1996	James Cafiero (R)	William Gormley (R)	Raymond Zane (D)	John Matheussen (R)	Walter Rand (D)	John Adler (D)
1994–1996	James Cafiero (R)	William Gormley (R)	Raymond Zane (D)	John Matheussen (R)	Wayne Bryant (D)	John Adler (D)
1996–1998	James Cafiero (R)	William Gormley (R)	Raymond Zane (D)	John Matheussen (R)	Wayne Bryant (D)	John Adler (D)
1998–2000	James Cafiero (R)	William Gormley (R)	Raymond Zane (D)	John Matheussen (R)	Wayne Bryant (D)	John Adler (D)
2000–2002	James Cafiero (R)	William Gormley (R)	Raymond Zane (D)	John Matheussen (R)	Wayne Bryant (D)	John Adler (D)
2000–2002	James Cafiero (R)	William Gormley (R)	Raymond Zane (R)	John Matheussen (R)	Wayne Bryant (D)	John Adler (D)
2002–2004	James Cafiero (R)	William Gormley (R)	Stephen M. Sweeney (D)	John Matheussen (R)	Wayne Bryant (D)	John Adler (D)
2002–2004	James Cafiero (R)	William Gormley (R)	Stephen M. Sweeney (D)	George F. Geist (R)	Wayne Bryant (D)	John Adler (D)
2004–2006	Nicholas Asselta (R)	William Gormley (R)	Stephen M. Sweeney (D)	Frederick Madden (D)	Wayne Bryant (D)	John Adler (D)
2006–2008	Nicholas Asselta (R)	William Gormley (R)	Stephen M. Sweeney (D)	Frederick Madden (D)	Wayne Bryant (D)	John Adler (D)
2008–2010	Jeff Van Drew (D)	Jim Whelan (D)	Stephen M. Sweeney (D)	Frederick Madden (D)	Dana L. Redd (D)	John Adler (D)
2008–2010	Jeff Van Drew (D)	Jim Whelan (D)	Stephen M. Sweeney (D)	Frederick Madden (D)	Dana L. Redd (D)	James Beach (D)
2010–2012	Jeff Van Drew (D)	Jim Whelan (D)	Stephen M. Sweeney (D)	Frederick Madden (D)	Dana L. Redd (D)	James Beach (D)
2010–2012	Jeff Van Drew (D)	Jim Whelan (D)	Stephen M. Sweeney (D)	Frederick Madden (D)	Donald Norcross (D)	James Beach (D)
2012–2014	Jeff Van Drew (D)	Jim Whelan (D)	Stephen M. Sweeney (D)	Frederick Madden (D)	Donald Norcross (D)	James Beach (D)

== See also ==
- List of New Jersey state legislatures
