= Ernest F. Schuck =

American politician (1929-2009)

Member of the New Jersey Senate from the 5th Legislative District
- In office January 8, 1974 – January 12, 1982 Serving with James Florio, Ronald J. Casella and Walter Rand
- Preceded by: District created
- Succeeded by: Wayne R. Bryant and Francis J. Gorman

Mayor of Barrington, New Jersey
- In office 1968–1973

Personal details
- Born: March 1, 1929 Bridgeboro in Delran Township, New Jersey
- Died: May 16, 2009 (aged 80) Barrington, New Jersey
- Party: Democratic
- Spouse: Elizabeth McNichol
- Children: two daughters, one son
- Education: Rutgers University College

Ernest F. Schuck (March 1, 1929 – May 16, 2009) was an American Democratic Party politician who served for seven years as mayor of Barrington, New Jersey and eight years in the New Jersey General Assembly, from 1974 to 1982, where he represented the 5th Legislative District.

== Personal life ==
Born in the Bridgeboro section of Delran Township, New Jersey, on March 1, 1929, Schuck attended Palmyra High School. He received an undergraduate degree from Rutgers University College and later served during the Korean War with the United States Army.

He was a frequent visitor to Ocean City, New Jersey, where he and his family owned a summer home. He was married to the former Elizabeth McNichol and had two daughters and a son.

Schuck died at his home in Barrington at the age of 80 on May 16, 2009, due to lung cancer.

== Elected office ==
Schuck was first elected in 1966 to serve on the Borough Council of Barrington, New Jersey and was elected the next year to be the borough's mayor, serving in that role until 1974. He was elected in 1973, together with James Florio, to represent the 5th Legislative District in the New Jersey General Assembly, which covered portions of Camden County and Gloucester County; Florio resigned in 1975 to take a seat in Congress. Schuck was re-elected in 1975, 1977 and 1979, winning by overwhelming margins each time, with Walter Rand as his running mate.

While serving in office, Schuck supported legislation that created the state income tax, legalized casino gambling and established restrictions on development in the Pine Barrens. In the Assembly, Schuck served on the Intergovernmental Relations Commission, the Law Revision and Legislative Review Commission and the Legislative Oversight Committee. In the 1977 general election, Schuck and other local Democrat candidates for the legislature ran on platforms supporting Governor Brendan Byrne's re-election bid and his efforts to create a state income tax, as senior citizens and the many area residents commuting to work in Philadelphia and paying state taxes in Pennsylvania would all be likely to see a net gain from the proposal; Byrne's Republican opponent in the race for governor that year, Raymond Bateman, had proposed repealing the income tax and raising the necessary funds through a series of changes that included increasing the state sales tax.

In the June 1981 Democratic Primary, Schuck ran for the nomination for the New Jersey Senate seat that had been held by Angelo Errichetti, who had been charged with his involvement in the Abscam scandal and would ultimately be forced to leave office on August 14, 1981, after his conviction. Schuck faced off against his former Assembly running mate Walter Rand, who won the nomination by a 54%–46% margin and went on to win election to the Senate seat, serving until his death in 1995.
