= Chester Apy =

American politician (1932–2021)

Member of the New Jersey General Assembly from District 5B
- In office January 11, 1972 – January 8, 1974
- Preceded by: Joseph Azzolina; James M. Coleman
- Succeeded by: District abolished
- In office January 9, 1968 – January 13, 1970
- Preceded by: District created
- Succeeded by: James M. Coleman

Personal details
- Born: March 8, 1932 Red Bank, New Jersey
- Died: May 30, 2021 (aged 89) Red Bank, New Jersey
- Party: Republican

Chester Apy (March 8, 1932 – May 30, 2021) was an American lawyer and Republican politician who served in the New Jersey General Assembly from District 5B from 1968 to 1970, and from 1972 to 1974. First elected in 1967 in District 5B with Joseph Azzolina, he did not stand for reelection in 1969. However, he ran again in 1971, and won a seat in the Assembly again serving another single term alongside Democrat Eugene J. Bedell.

Apy attended grammar school in Little Silver, Peddie School, Sherborne School (as an exchange student), and Princeton University, and earned an LL.B from Columbia University School of Law. A resident of Little Silver, he worked as an attorney and was a partner in a Red Bank law firm.

He died on May 30, 2021, in Red Bank, New Jersey at age 89.
