= Livingston College and Campus =

Livingston College and Campus may refer to:

- Livingston College, the academic college that existed at Rutgers University from 1969 to 2007
- Livingston Campus (Rutgers University), the physical campus that is part of Rutgers University's Piscataway-New Brunswick area campus
