= Hurffville =

Hurffville may refer to the following places in the U.S. state of New Jersey:

- Hurffville, New Jersey, an unincorporated area within Washington Township, Gloucester County
- Hurffville School, an elementary school in Hurffville
