= 1980 New Jersey Democratic presidential primary =

1980 New Jersey Democratic presidential primaries
- June 3, 1980

113 Democratic National Convention delegates
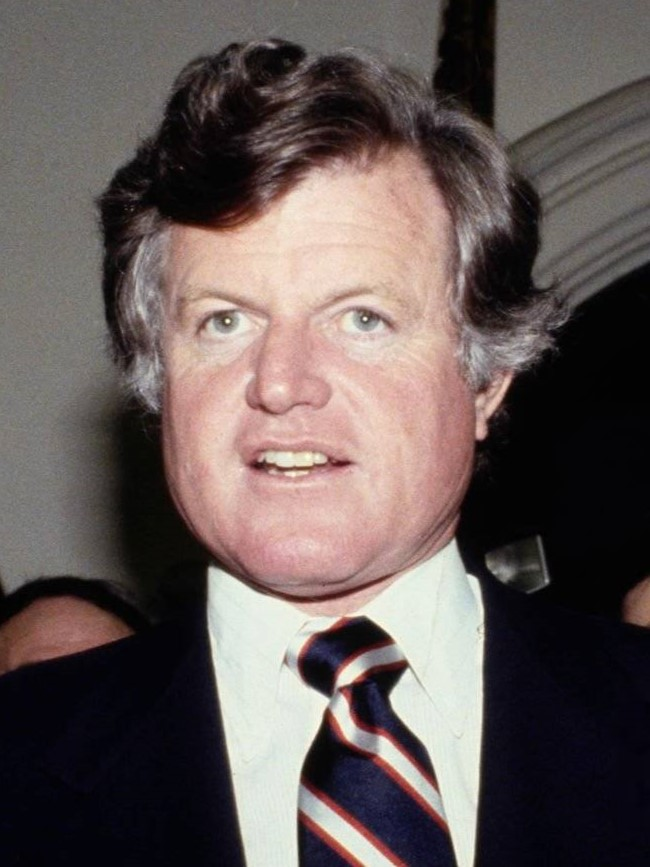

Candidate	Ted Kennedy	Jimmy Carter
Home state	Massachusetts	Georgia
Delegate count	68	45
Popular vote	315,109	212,387
Percentage	56.2%	37.9%

The 1980 New Jersey Democratic presidential primary was held on June 3, 1980, in New Jersey as one of the Democratic Party's statewide nomination contests ahead of the 1980 United States presidential election. Kennedy defeated Carter by a margin of over 100,000 votes, carrying every county except Cape May, which Carter won by seven votes, and Salem. Despite the landslide popular result, the delegate allocation rules gave Carter a proportional share of the pledged delegates, securing sufficient votes for the nomination at the 1980 Democratic National Convention.

Over 617,000 voters participated in the primary, breaking the record set four years earlier.

== Background ==
In 1976, Jimmy Carter had won the New Jersey preference primary with a large majority of the vote. However, in the contest to elect delegates, Carter delegates were defeated by an uncommitted slate by a wide margin, picking up only twenty-one of the state's 108 delegates. Carter narrowly lost the New Jersey general election to President Gerald Ford, a result blamed on divisions within the Democratic Party and the extreme unpopularity of Governor Brendan Byrne at the time.

By 1980, Carter's popularity sagged nationally. He was challenged in the Democratic primary by Senator Ted Kennedy and Governor of California Jerry Brown. However, Carter won 14 of the first 15 primary contests, losing only in Kennedy's home state of Massachusetts. Following Carter's failed April 25 attempt to rescue American hostages in Iran, his popularity had begun to falter, even within the Democratic Party. Entering the final slate of primary elections on June 3, he had still not yet secured the support of enough delegates to clinch the 1980 nomination.

=== Procedure ===
In the 1972 Democratic primary, delegates had been elected on a statewide and county basis. In 1976, delegates were elected on a statewide and state legislative district basis

In 1980, the procedure was changed again to elect 77 delegates, chosen exclusively on a congressional district basis, with six elected from the first and second districts and five elected from each of the other thirteen districts. After the June primary, another 36 delegates would be apportioned according to the preference primary vote and selected by the state Democratic Party, bringing the total to 113. For the first time, delegates were committed by law to vote for their pledged candidate on the first ballot.

To assemble delegate slates, caucuses for each campaign were held simultaneously at one site in each congressional district on Sunday, April 13. Over one thousand individuals filed with the Democratic State Committee to be considered as delegates or alternates in advance. Of those advance filers, 493 were for Kennedy, 335 for Carter, 121 for LaRouche, and 84 uncommitted. However, any person could submit their name for consideration at the caucus by attesting that they were registered party members and would attend the caucus for only one presidential slate. Campaign staff had the right to challenge any individual's attestation.

== Candidates ==
- Jimmy Carter, incumbent President of the United States
- Ted Kennedy, U.S. senator from Massachusetts and brother of John F. Kennedy and Robert F. Kennedy
- Lyndon LaRouche, conspiracy theorist and radical activist

=== Declined ===
- Jerry Brown, Governor of California

== Endorsements ==
Jimmy Carter

State executive branch officials

- Brendan Byrne, Governor of New Jersey
- Robert B. Meyner, former governor of New Jersey

State legislators

- Christopher Jackman, assemblyman from West New York and speaker of the General Assembly
- Greta Kiernan, former assemblywoman from Harrington Park
- Anthony Russo, state senator from Union
- Wally Sheil, state senator from Jersey City and chair of the Hudson County Democratic Party
- Jackie Walker, assemblywoman from Matawan

Party officials

- Richard Coffee, chair of the New Jersey Democratic Party
- Vincent Rigolosi, chair of the Bergen County Democratic Organization
- 20 out of 21 county party chairs

Individuals

- Daniel Gaby, advertising executive and candidate for U.S. Senate in 1972
Ted Kennedy

U.S. senators

- Harrison Williams, U.S. senator from New Jersey

U.S. representatives

- James J. Howard, U.S. representative for New Jersey's 3rd congressional district (ran for delegate)

State legislators

- Eugene Bedell, state senator from Keansburg
- Frank Dodd, state senator from West Orange
- James P. Dugan, state senator from Bayonne and former state party chairman (ran for delegate)
- Angelo Errichetti, state senator and mayor of Camden
- John T. Gregorio, state senator from Linden
- Jeremiah F. O'Connor, former state senator from Saddle Brook
- Richard Van Wagner, assemblyman from Middletown
- Raymond Zane, state senator from Woodbury

Local officials

- Sharpe James, member of the Newark City Council (ran for delegate)
- Jeremiah O'Connor, Bergen County Freeholder
- Peter Shapiro, Essex County Executive (ran for delegate)

Party officials

- June S. Fischer, member of the Democratic National Committee
- Patricia Sebold, chair of the Livingston Democratic Committee

Individuals

- Ida L. Castro, Rutgers Law School student
- Bernard Kenny, Hudson County attorney
- Evelyn Williams
- Alfred Wurf, president of the New Jersey AFSCME

== Campaign ==
The "Draft Kennedy" effort in New Jersey was started in September 1979 by former state senator James Dugan of Bayonne. Dugan, who had been state party chair from 1973 to 1977 and opposed Carter's nomination in 1976, was joined by five Democratic state senators and two assemblymen. At the time, Kennedy had not yet declared his campaign but was seen as the favorite for the Democratic nomination over Carter. However, after announcing his campaign in November, Kennedy got off to a slow start. A disastrous interview with Roger Mudd weakened his standing with voters, and the Iran hostage crisis incited a rallying effect around Carter which delayed several high-profile endorsements in New Jersey, including that of U.S. Senator Harrison Williams.

As he had in 1976, Governor Brendan Byrne supported Carter. Despite almost universal establishment support for the incumbent Carter, few New Jersey elected officials opted to appear on behalf of the Carter campaign, which instead relied heavily on surrogates from out of state, including Walter Mondale and Rosalynn Carter. One of the few New Jersey officials to publicly stump for the president was New Jersey Senate president Joseph P. Merlino, who was also campaigning on his own behalf for governor in 1981.

After Kennedy officially declared his candidacy, he named U.S. representative James J. Howard and Essex County Executive Peter Shapiro, a friend and former classmate of Kennedy's nephew Robert Jr. Kennedy's campaign was managed by Fran Rein, a close ally of Shapiro who had been elected as an uncommitted delegate in 1976. Later in the race, when New Jersey became critical to Kennedy's national strategy, John Sasso was hired to manage day-to-day operations. The campaign gained some attention during a Newark fundraising stop in January 1980, when three Communist Workers' Party members were arrested for throwing eggs at Kennedy. Kennedy faced an additional challenge from the presence of the Uncommitted slate, which was expected to draw anti-Carter votes away from Kennedy.

In late May, polls indicated an extremely close race with Carter declining nationally, and Kennedy publicly announced that a victory in New Jersey was crucial to his campaign. According to Joseph F. Sullivan of The New York Times, Carter was able to outspend and outman the Kennedy campaign through establishment support. Vice President Walter Mondale visited the state to urge party unity ahead of the expected general election campaign against Ronald Reagan. Kennedy countered with an aggressive personal campaign in New Jersey, criticizing Carter's policies as "closet Republican" and pressing for a debate against Carter on economic and foreign policy issues. The Kennedy campaign also sought to maximize free media in the state. In one such instance, the Kennedy campaign presented their candidate for television cameras being mobbed by voters in Journal Square; they achieved this effect by having Kennedy walk against the tide of commuters leaving the PATH station at rush hour. The Journal Square stop was designed to remind voters of popular support for Kennedy's brothers John and Robert in their 1960 and 1968 campaigns, respectively.

As election day drew near, the race was expected to be influenced by down-ballot attention to local contests in Newark and Middlesex County, where there were key congressional primaries, and Hudson County, where an ongoing intraparty struggle was focused on the race for sheriff. Though there was a large undecided vote in pre-primary polling, Kennedy remained the underdog in the state and nationally, although his campaign noted that he had shown his greatest strength in eastern Pennsylvania, southern New York, and Connecticut. Shapiro noted that Kennedy was strong in urban areas. The Carter campaign downplayed expectations as well, arguing that Kennedy should have had "a clear edge." Kennedy visited the state six times in the final 17 days before the primary; Rosalynn Carter also campaigned in Jersey City and Newark to cap off her husband's campaign.

== Results ==
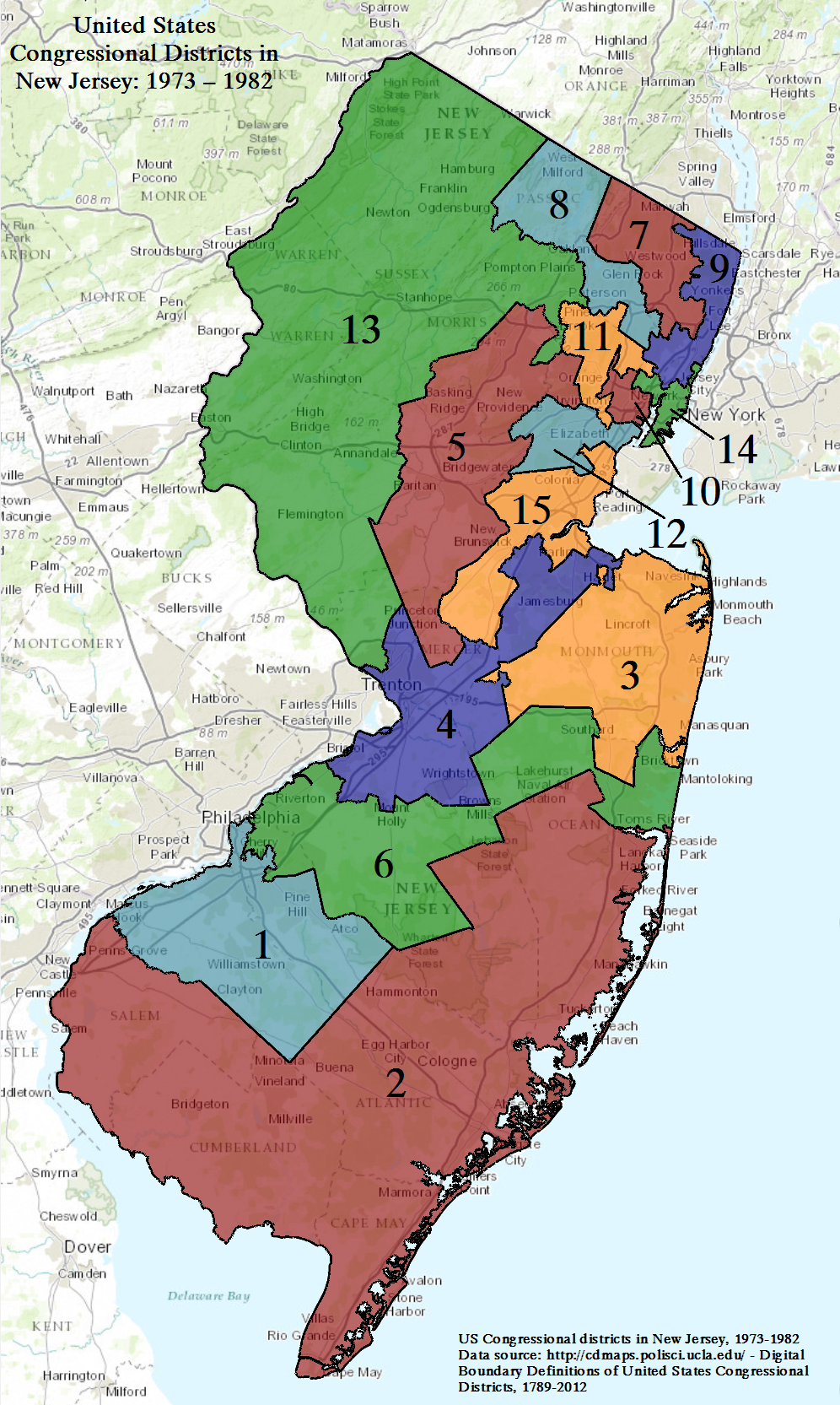
Each of the fifteen districts in New Jersey elected five delegates, with the exception of the 1st and 2nd districts, which elected six each.

Kennedy won the primary by an overwhelming margin, carrying every congressional district. However, the proportional allocation of delegates meant that Carter gained enough delegates in New Jersey alone to secure the Democratic nomination. Turnout was even lighter than projected, influenced by thunderstorms throughout the state.

Despite the indication that Carter would clinch the nomination with support from a minority of New Jersey delegates, the Kennedy campaign hailed the result as a demonstration that only Kennedy, who had also won in Pennsylvania, New York, Connecticut, and Massachusetts, had the necessary support in the industrial Northeast to defeat Ronald Reagan in the general election.

1980 New Jersey presidential preference primary
Party	Candidate	Votes	%
Democratic	Ted Kennedy	315,109	56.18%
Democratic	Jimmy Carter (incumbent)	212,387	37.86%
Democratic	Uncommitted	19,499	3.48%
Democratic	Lyndon LaRouche	13,913	2.48%
Total votes		560,908	100.00%

Exit polling conducted by The New York Times and CBS News indicated that Carter had won the support of voters most concerned with foreign issues, while Kennedy won among those chiefly concerned with economic issues. Fifteen percent of Democratic voters indicated that they would support Reagan over Carter in the general election. The New York Times/CBS News poll also indicated that New Jersey voters had a dimmer opinion of the economy and Carter's leadership than voters in Ohio and California (which voted on the same day) and in New York and Illinois during earlier primaries. Only 31 percent of primary voters approved of Carter's handling of the Iran hostage crisis and only 21 percent approved of his handling of the economy.

Despite Carter's poor performance, incumbents and establishment favorites won in all congressional and local races, indicating that the primary factor in Kennedy's victory was voters' personal dissatisfaction with Carter or approval of Kennedy.

In Hudson County, Kennedy was aided by the heated campaign for sheriff, which incumbent John E. Gillen won without party support. Gillen's campaign likely diminished the effect of the county line in support of Carter.

== Aftermath ==
Despite the loss, Governor Brendan Byrne emphasized that the result had "locked up" the nomination for Carter.

Carter went on to lose the general election in New Jersey to Ronald Reagan, making him the only candidate to lose four statewide elections in New Jersey.
