= Bridgeboro, New Jersey =

Populated place in Burlington County, New Jersey, US

- Unincorporated community
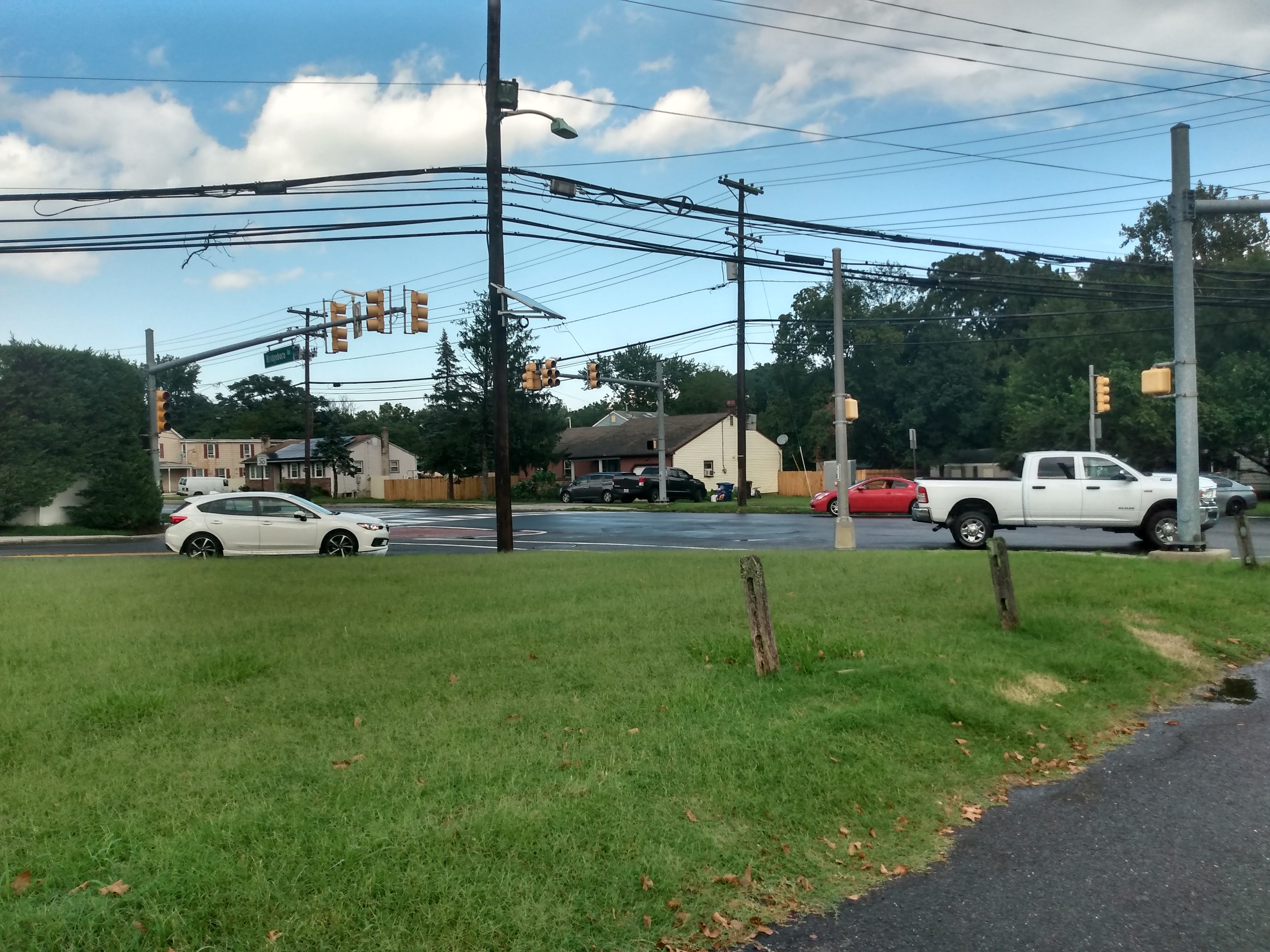
- Intersection of Bridgeboro Road and Creek Road

- Location of Bridgeboro in Burlington County (Inset: Location of county within the state of New Jersey) Bridgeboro (New Jersey) Bridgeboro (the United States)
- Coordinates: 40°01′19″N 74°55′57″W
- Country: United States
- State: New Jersey
- County: Burlington
- Township: Delran
- Elevation: 39 ft (12 m)
- Time zone: UTC−05:00 (Eastern (EST))
  - Summer (DST): UTC−04:00 (EDT)
- ZIP Code: 08075
- Area code: 856
- GNIS feature ID: 874925

Bridgeboro is an unincorporated community located within Delran Township in Burlington County, in the U.S. state of New Jersey. It is situated on the Rancocas Creek. Bridgeboro is located near U.S. Route 130, which crosses the Rancocas, connecting Delran with Delanco Township.

== Transportation ==
NJ Transit provides service to and from Philadelphia on the 409 route.

== Notable people ==
People who were born in, residents of, or otherwise closely associated with Bridgeboro include:

- Ernest F. Schuck (1929-2009), politician who served for seven years as mayor of Barrington, New Jersey and eight years in the New Jersey General Assembly, from 1974 to 1982, where he represented the 5th Legislative District.
