= Louis R. Aikins =

American politician

Member of the New Jersey House of Representatives from the 5th district
- In office 1968–1970
- Preceded by: James M. Coleman
- Succeeded by: John I. Dawes

Personal details
- Born: December 20, 1926
- Died: July 23, 1982 (aged 55)
- Party: Republican
- Education: University of Rochester
- Profession: Lawyer

Louis R. Aikins (December 20, 1926 – July 23, 1982) was an American Republican Party politician who served in the New Jersey General Assembly from 1968 to 1970, as well as various local positions in Long Branch.

== Biography ==
Born in New York City on December 20, 1926, Aikins was raised in Long Branch, New Jersey, and graduated in 1944 from Long Branch High School. He graduated from University of Rochester as part of the class of 1948.

In 1964, Aikins was the Chairman of the Monmouth County Republican Party. In November 1966, while he was the City Attorney of Long Branch, the Better Government League won support for its efforts to abolish the city's ward system for a wholly at-large city council as well as replacing the council-manager city government with a mayor-council system under the Faulkner Act.

Aikins served a single term in the New Jersey General Assembly from 1968 to 1970 representing the District 5A as a Republican. During his time in office Aikins supported an effort to reduce the stringent requirements for amateur radio enthusiasts and clubs to gain a license to operate a radio station.

After his time in office Aikins would serve as a judge on the Monmouth County Court. Aikins died on July 23, 1982.
