= Kenneth A. Gewertz =

American politician (1934–2006)

Member of the New Jersey General Assembly
- In office January 11, 1972 – January 8, 1980 Serving with Francis J. Gorman
- Preceded by: Thomas J. Shusted; James M. Turner
- Succeeded by: Daniel Dalton; Dennis L. Riley
- Constituency: District 3B (1972–74); 4th district (1974–80)

Personal details
- Born: December 1, 1934 Chicago, Illinois, U.S.
- Died: December 12, 2006 (aged 72) Orlando, Florida, U.S.
- Party: Democratic
- Spouse: Mary Diane Vasbinder (m. 1957; div. 1986)
- Children: Two daughters, one son
- Education: Temple University
- Occupation: Building supplies

Kenneth A. Gewertz (December 1, 1934 – December 12, 2006) was an American Democratic Party politician who served as mayor of Deptford Township, New Jersey, and in the New Jersey General Assembly from 1972 to 1980. His advocacy efforts on behalf of his hometown earned him a reputation as "Mr. Deptford".

== Early life and education ==
Gewertz was born on December 1, 1934, in Chicago as one of four children. He moved as a one-year-old to Philadelphia, where he attended West Philadelphia High School, dropping out of school after two years and serving in the military and working at a number of odd jobs. He is a graduate of Temple University in Philadelphia.

== Career ==
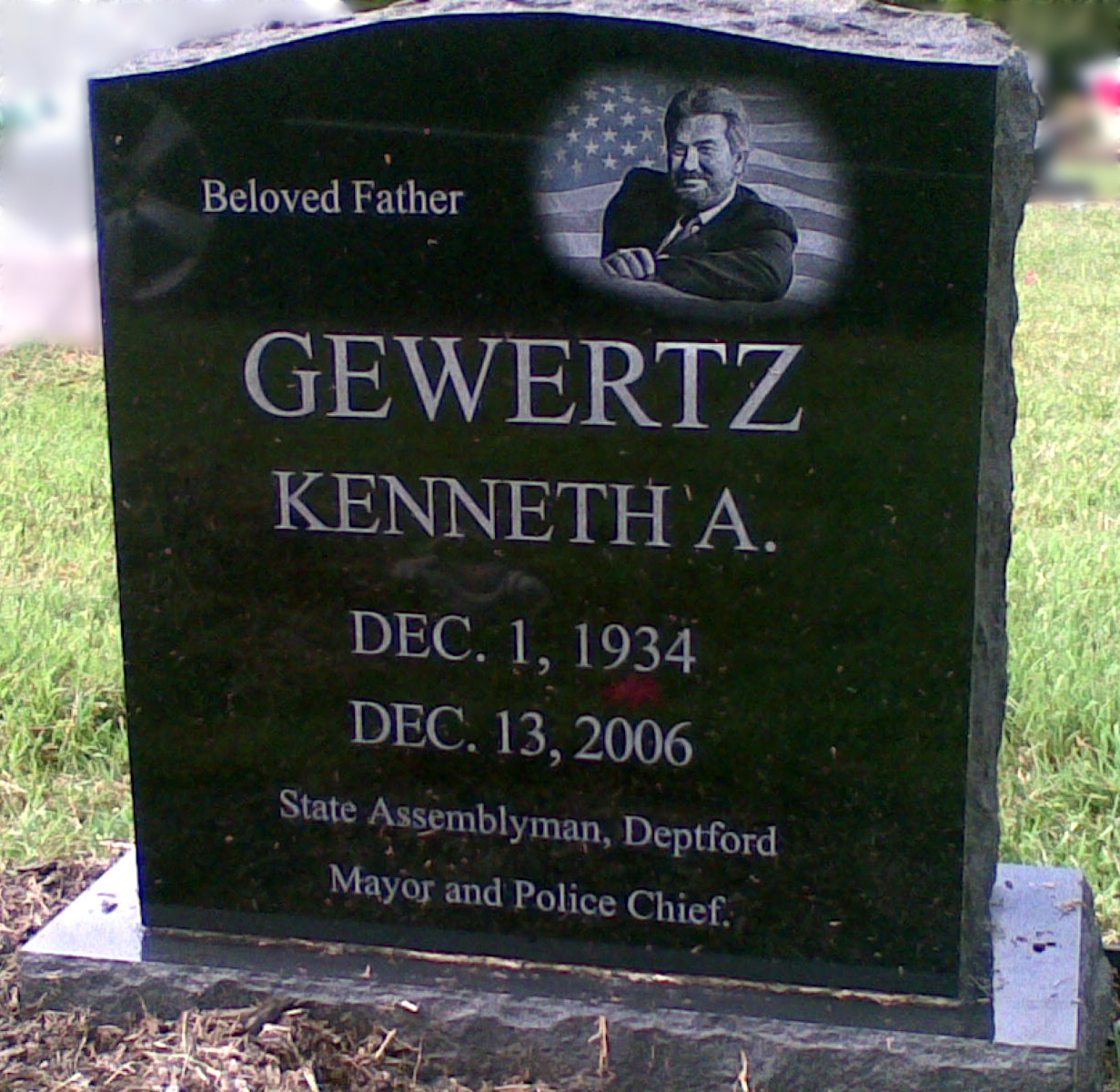
Gewertz's burial place at Hillcrest Memorial Park in Hurffville, New Jersey

He was president of a building supply company. A resident of Deptford Township, Gewertz joined the Deptford Township Police Department in 1962, earning attention by bringing a .357 Magnum for use on the job. He was appointed as the township's chief of police in January 1963. He and his entire 12-member police force resigned in May of that year, staging the first police strike in state history, to protest the hiring of an officer who did not reside in the municipality. After the strike ended, the Township Committee refused to bring him back as police chief.

He was a member of the Deptford Township Council from 1966 to 1968, and served as the township's mayor from 1969 to 1972. In 1970, while serving as mayor, the township changed its form of government to the Council-Manager form, removing executive powers from Gewertz as mayor to an appointed Township Manager.

As part of an ultimately successful effort to shame legislators into providing $328,000 of state funds for the roadways needed to create the Deptford Mall, Gewertz paid Oscar Mayer to create a piece of lunch meat 10-foot (3.0 m) long that he brought to the state capital in Trenton, New Jersey, together with two busloads of supporters to hand the luncheon meat to Transportation Secretary John C. Kohl in order to make his point that officials were "full of baloney".

After the Republican Assembly candidates refused to participate in a debate, Gewertz hired a helicopter to hover over the Republican Party's annual picnic, creating havoc on the ground.

In the 1971 general election, Gewertz and Francis J. Gorman were elected to represent District 3B of the General Assembly, one of four pairs of representatives from the 3rd Legislative District, which was further divided into four Assembly districts (Districts 3A, 3B, 3C, and 3D); District 3B included portions of Camden and Gloucester counties.

In January 1972, David Friedland was one of four Democrats who voted to give the minority Republicans control of the General Assembly, electing Thomas Kean as Assembly Speaker; Friedland and his allies argued that the Democratic leadership had been ignoring the needs of Hudson County. Gewertz shouted on the Assembly floor that "Jesus Christ had his Judas, the Democrats now have their David Friedland".

Upon the creation of a 40-district legislative map in 1973 in response to the one-man-one-vote system mandated by the 1964 Supreme Court decision in Reynolds v. Sims, the new 4th Legislative District consisted of portions of Burlington County, Camden County, Gloucester County. In the 1973 general election, both Gewertz and Gorman were elected to the General Assembly, representing the 4th District; they were re-elected in 1975 and 1977.

James M. Turner was removed from the Senate on June 28, 1973, after being convicted for his role in a conspiracy in which bags filled with 6,500 amphetamine tablets were placed in Gewertz's home, as part of an effort to destroy Gewertz's political career. With his conviction, Turner was barred from running for office or serving in any state office.

Governor Brendan Byrne and Democratic party leaders initiated efforts in early 1974 to marginalize Gewertz in his role as Majority Whip, based on Gewertz's opposition to Byrne's legislative initiatives, including public financing of elections and the imposition of a state income tax to be used towards providing additional aid to needy school districts.

In May 1978, Gewertz agreed to end his ownership of a company that had sold 250 slot machines to Resorts Casino Hotel, which had been in the process of opening the first casino in Atlantic City and had wanted to have access to multiple vendors for the gambling devices; the Legislature's Ethics Committee had issued a confidential decision that Gewertz hadn't violated any ethical constraint, but was willing to disclose the decision and eliminate his involvement to avoid any appearance of a conflict of interest.

In 1979, James Florio, then a Congressman, convinced Daniel Dalton and Dennis L. Riley to run in the June primary under the label of the "Florio Democratic Team" against three-term incumbents Gewertz and Gorman, who had the support of Angelo Errichetti and the Camden County Democratic Organization. Dalton (with 31.3% of the vote) and Riley (with 28.3%) won the two ballot spots in the primary balloting.

Gewertz was known for driving an orange Corvette and wearing yellow plaid suits while on the floor of the Assembly. In a 1980 incident, he filed charges against a group of four prostitutes in Atlantic City who had stolen $8,000 worth of jewelry from him.

With Burlington County removed from the 4th District and portions of Atlantic County added in redistricting following the 1980 United States census, Gewertz ran for election to a two-year term in the New Jersey Senate for the seat that had been held by Democrat Joseph A. Maressa, who chose not to run for office in the wake of the Abscam scandal. Gewertz lost to Daniel Dalton in the June 1981 Democratic Party primary by a 65%–35% margin.

In 1989, Gewertz was elected to a three-year term on the Deptford Township Council.

== Death ==
Gewertz died of a heart attack on December 12, 2006, at the age of 72 at a home he owned in Orlando, Florida. He was interred at Hillcrest Memorial Park in Hurffville, New Jersey.
