= Rutgers University College =

University College is an undergraduate constituent college of Rutgers University established in 1934 to serve adult, part-time and non-traditional students. This division is offered at campuses in the cities of Newark and Camden.

University College in Rutgers–New Brunswick was eliminated in 2007, along with the other undergraduate liberal arts colleges (Rutgers, Douglass, Livingston Colleges, and the liberal arts aspect of Cook College) which were combined into a School of Arts and Sciences in an effort to consolidate undergraduate education, and have one common, consistent policy for admissions, curriculum and graduation requirements for all liberal arts undergraduates.

== Notable alumnus ==
- Ernest F. Schuck (1929–2009), politician who served for seven years as mayor of Barrington, New Jersey and eight years in the New Jersey General Assembly, from 1974 to 1982, where he represented the 5th Legislative District.
