= Nilsa Cruz-Perez =

American politician (born 1961)

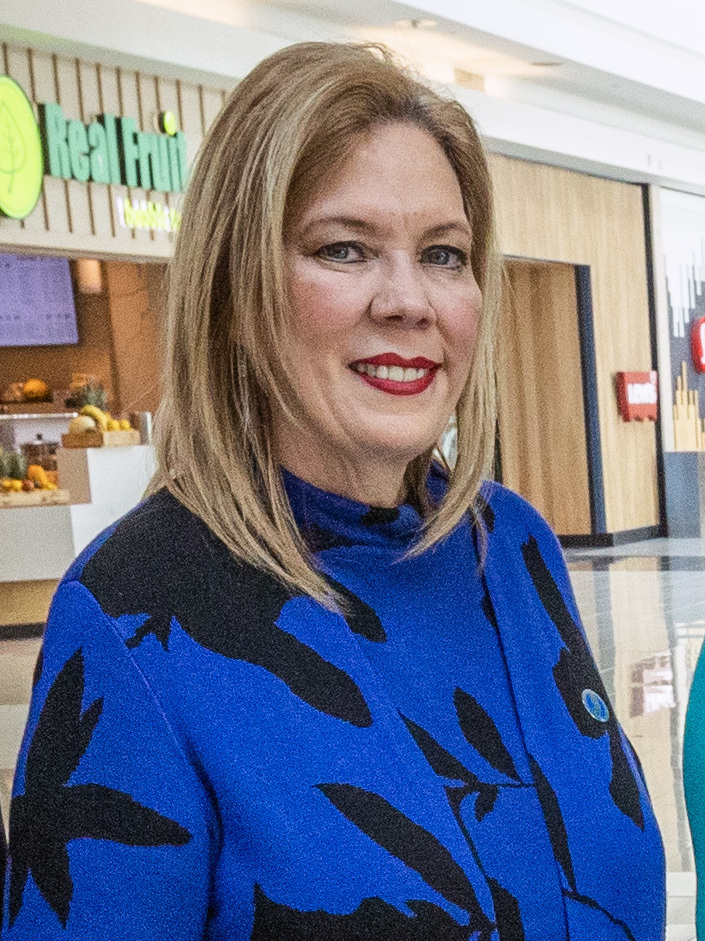

Member of the New Jersey Senate from the 5th district
- Incumbent
- Assumed office December 15, 2014
- Preceded by: Donald Norcross

Chairman of the New Jersey Senate Economic Growth Committee
- Incumbent
- Assumed office January 9, 2018
- Preceded by: Raymond Lesniak

Member of the New Jersey General Assembly from the 5th district
- In office February 27, 1995 – January 12, 2010
- Preceded by: Wayne Bryant
- Succeeded by: Angel Fuentes; Donald Norcross

Deputy Majority Leader of the New Jersey General Assembly
- In office January 8, 2008 – January 12, 2010
- Leader: Bonnie Watson Coleman
- Preceded by: Position established
- Succeeded by: Position abolished

Personal details
- Born: January 21, 1961 (age 65) Bayamón, Puerto Rico
- Party: Democratic
- Education: University of Puerto Rico (BA); University of Maryland
- Occupation: Director of Constituent Services, Camden County
- Website: Legislative web page Senate Democrats website

Military service
- Allegiance: United States
- Branch: United States Army
- Service years: 1981–1987
- Rank: Sergeant

Nilsa Cruz-Perez (born January 21, 1961) is an American politician who was sworn into office to represent the 5th Legislative District in the New Jersey Senate on December 15, 2014, to fill the vacant seat of Donald Norcross. She had previously served in the New Jersey General Assembly from 1995 to 2010 and is the first Latina woman to serve in the Assembly.

== Early life ==
Cruz-Perez born on January 21, 1961, in Bayamón, Puerto Rico. She was a member of the Popular Democratic Party during her youth. Attended the University of Puerto Rico earning a degree in political science, Big Bend Community College Army Quartermaster School and the Temple University Overseas Division. Cruz-Perez served in the United States Army from 1981 until her been honorably discharged in 1987, she was stationed in Mainz, Germany and attained the rank of sergeant. Cruz-Perez works as a part-time community development specialist for the Camden County Improvement Authority. Formerly a resident of Camden, she now resides in Barrington.

== Career ==
=== New Jersey Assembly ===
Cruz-Perez was selected in February 1995 to fill the vacancy created by resignation of Assemblyman Wayne R. Bryant, when Bryant was selected to fill the Senate seat vacated due to the death of Senator Walter Rand on January 6, 1995. She was sworn into the Assembly on February 27. Serving in the Assembly until 2010, representing the 5th District for the entire time she was serving, she was the Assistant Majority Leader from 2002 to 2005 and Deputy Majority Leader from January 2008 to January 2010. In 2009 she announced that she would retire after her current term in the legislature.

Cruz-Perez was the primary sponsor of Bill S2599 which seeks to change the legal term of "illegal alien" to "undocumented foreign national."

=== New Jersey Senate ===
Following the election and swearing in of State Senator Donald Norcross to the United States House of Representatives in 2014, the Democratic committees of Camden and Gloucester counties (the two counties within the 5th district) appointed Cruz-Perez to the vacant Senate seat. She served until a 2015 special election where she won. While in the Senate, she is serving on the Economic Growth, (vice-chair), Military and Veterans' Affairs, and Transportation committees and Joint Committee on the Public Schools. In addition to her legislative duties, she is also a vice-chair of the New Jersey Democratic State Committee (since 2015) and a member of the Rutgers University–Camden Board of Directors (since 2014). Between her legislative stints, she was the Democratic Vice-chair of the 2011 New Jersey Apportionment Commission, the committee delegated to redraw the state legislative districts following the 2010 census.

In 2025, Cruz-Perez authored legislation to prohibit the commercial farming of octopuses, citing concerns about octopus intelligence and animal rights.

==== Committees ====
Committee assignments for the current session are:

- Economic Growth (as chair)
- Military and Veterans' Affairs (as vice-chair)
- Budget and Appropriations

==== District 5 ====
Each of the 40 districts in the New Jersey Legislature has one representative in the New Jersey Senate and two members in the New Jersey General Assembly. The representatives from the 5th District for the 2024–2025 Legislative Session are:

- Senator Nilsa Cruz-Perez (D)
- Assemblyman Bill Moen (D) , and
- Assemblyman William Spearman (D)

== Electoral history ==
=== New Jersey Senate ===
5th Legislative District General Election, 2023
Party	Candidate	Votes	%
Democratic	Nilsa Cruz-Perez (incumbent)	25,799	68.7
Republican	Clyde E. Cook	11,245	29.9
Rights Tranquility Peace	Mohammad Kabir	530	1.4
Total votes		37,574	100.0
Democratic hold			

5th Legislative District general election, 2021
Party	Candidate	Votes	%
Democratic	Nilsa Cruz-Perez (incumbent)	31,246	57.70
Republican	Clyde Cook	22,903	42.30
Total votes		54,149	100.0
Democratic hold			

2017 New Jersey Senate election for the 5th Legislative District
Party	Candidate	Votes	%	±%
Democratic	Nilsa Cruz-Perez (Incumbent)	29,031	66.1	▼33.9
Republican	Keith Walker	14,463	32.9	N/A
Challenge Promise Fix	Mohammad Kabir	454	1.0	N/A
Total votes		43,948	100.0	

2015 Special New Jersey Senate election for the 5th Legislative District
Party	Candidate	Votes	%	±%
Democratic	Nilsa Cruz-Perez (Incumbent)	19,150	100.0	▲42.1
Total votes		19,150	100.0	

=== New Jersey Assembly ===
2007 New Jersey General Assembly election for the 5th Legislative District
Party	Candidate	Votes	%	±%
Democratic	Joe Roberts (Incumbent)	17,554	32.2	▼13.2
Democratic	Nilsa Cruz-Perez (Incumbent)	15,978	29.3	▼13.2
Republican	Edward Torres	9,136	16.8	N/A
Republican	Jonathan Mangel	9,070	16.6	N/A
Green	Richard L. Giovanoni	1,419	2.6	▼2.5
Green	Mark Heacock	1,381	2.5	▼2.7
Total votes		54,538	100.0	

2005 New Jersey General Assembly election for the 5th Legislative District
Party	Candidate	Votes	%	±%
Democratic	Joe Roberts (Incumbent)	29,893	45.4	▲12.9
Democratic	Nilsa Cruz-Perez (Incumbent)	27,955	42.5	▲12.0
Green	Richard L. Giovanoni	3,429	5.2	N/A
Green	Mark Heacock	3,386	5.1	N/A
Libertarian	Kevin Ferrizzi	1,131	1.7	N/A
Total votes		65,794	100.0	

2003 New Jersey General Assembly election for the 5th Legislative District
Party	Candidate	Votes	%	±%
Democratic	Joe Roberts (Incumbent)	21,608	32.5	▼10.5
Democratic	Nilsa Cruz-Perez (Incumbent)	20,260	30.5	▼9.6
Republican	Jeffrey R. Kugler	12,467	18.7	▲1.8
Republican	Eddie Torres	12,165	18.3	N/A
Total votes		66,500	100.0	

2001 New Jersey General Assembly election for the 5th Legislative District
Party	Candidate	Votes	%
Democratic	Joe Roberts (Incumbent)	32,224	43.0
Democratic	Nilsa Cruz-Perez (Incumbent)	30,087	40.1
Republican	Ella Hilton	12,659	16.9
Total votes		74,970	100.0

1999 New Jersey General Assembly election for the 5th Legislative District
Party	Candidate	Votes	%	±%
Democratic	Joe Roberts (Incumbent)	18,429	43.6	▲0.1
Democratic	Nilsa Cruz-Perez (Incumbent)	16,398	38.8	▼0.6
Republican	William E. Spencer	7,438	17.6	▲1.6
Total votes		42,265	100.0	

1997 New Jersey General Assembly election for the 5th Legislative District
Party	Candidate	Votes	%	±%
Democratic	Joe Roberts (Incumbent)	31,898	43.5	▲9.3
Democratic	Nilsa Cruz-Perez (Incumbent)	28,918	39.4	▲7.9
Republican	Joe Smiriglio	11,744	16.0	▼1.6
Republican	No nomination made	777	1.1	▼15.5
Total votes		73,337	100.0	

1995 New Jersey General Assembly election for the 5th Legislative District
Party	Candidate	Votes	%	±%
Democratic	Joe Roberts (Incumbent)	20,618	34.2	▼0.5
Democratic	Nilsa Cruz-Perez (Incumbent)	19,006	31.5	▼3.4
Republican	David Brodecki	10,635	17.6	▲2.1
Republican	Jose Delgado	10,000	16.6	▲1.8
Total votes		60,259	100.0	

New Jersey Senate
Preceded by Donald Norcross	Member of the New Jersey Senate for the 5th District; December 15, 2014–present	Succeeded by Incumbent
New Jersey General Assembly
Preceded by Wayne Bryant	Member of the New Jersey General Assembly for the 5th District; February 27, 1995–January 12, 2010; With: Joseph J. Roberts	Succeeded by Donald Norcross; Angel Fuentes
