= Rutgers School of Arts and Sciences =

Coordinates: 40.499405°N 74.447073°W

The School of Arts and Sciences is an undergraduate constituent school at the New Brunswick-Piscataway area campus of Rutgers University. Established in 2007 from the merger of Rutgers' undergraduate liberal arts colleges and the non-student college known as the "Faculty of Arts and Sciences," the School of Arts and Sciences was implemented to centralize and consolidate undergraduate education at the university, focusing on providing one set of admissions and graduation requirements and imposing a universal core curriculum.

Previously, the undergraduate colleges offering liberal arts majors, Rutgers College (founded 1766), Cook College (founded 1862), Douglass College (founded 1918), University College (founded 1945), and Livingston College (founded 1969) maintained disparate standards for admission, graduation and curriculum.

Cook College was renamed the School of Environmental and Biological Sciences at the time of the 2007 merger. Although this school was not formally absorbed into the School of Arts and Sciences, those enrolling in Cook College had previously had the option of majoring not only in the environmental and biological fields, but also in the liberal arts, much as if they had been enrolled in one of the other liberal arts colleges. Students now enrolling may major only in the environmental and biological fields unique to the college. In this respect, one facet of the former Cook College was absorbed into the School of Arts and Sciences.

The faculty of these various colleges (including the liberal arts faculty of Cook College) had already been merged in 1982 into the "Faculty of Arts and Sciences," a college in which students could not enroll. Until 2007, undergraduates enrolling in liberal-arts classes shared the faculty of this school. Classes during this period could be held on any of the five campuses regardless of the school in which the student was enrolled. Students of Livingston, Douglass, and Cook colleges generally used residence and dining halls on their respective campus (Livingston [formerly "Kilmer"], Douglass, or Cook Campus). Administration and student center facilities of those colleges were respectively located as well. Rutgers College and University College administrations were located on the College Avenue campus. Most Rutgers College students were housed either on the College Avenue Campus or Busch Campus.

From 1982 to 2007, Rutgers, Cook, Douglass, and Livingston colleges also served as the choices of residential colleges with which students from professional colleges could affiliate, such as the schools of pharmacy and engineering. Students of the School of Arts and Sciences and affiliating students may be housed on any of the five campuses in New Brunswick-Piscataway. Women-only housing is available at the Douglass Residential College.
