= Lonna Hooks =

American politician

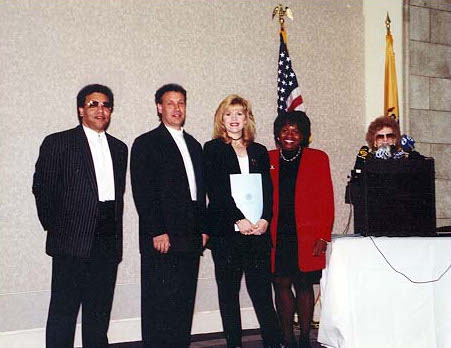
Hooks (fourth from left) at a 1996 event commemorating the proclamation of "Be Proud To Be In New Jersey" as the official state song

Lonna Hooks is the former Secretary of State of New Jersey. She served for four years in the Cabinet of former New Jersey Gov. Christine Todd Whitman. Governor Whitman said that Secretary Hooks was her business ombudsman as secretary of state.

== Biography ==
Prior to her appointment as Secretary of State, Hooks had been an attorney at Schering-Plough, and had served under Whitman at the New Jersey Board of Public Utilities as her chief of staff. Whitman announced in December 1993 that she would nominate Hooks to serve as Secretary of State.

Hooks is a graduate of Howard University and the Howard University School of Law. She has been a resident of Montclair, New Jersey.

Political offices
Preceded by Daniel Dalton	Secretary of State of New Jersey; 1994 – 1998	Succeeded by DeForest Soaries
