= Joseph J. Roberts =

American politician

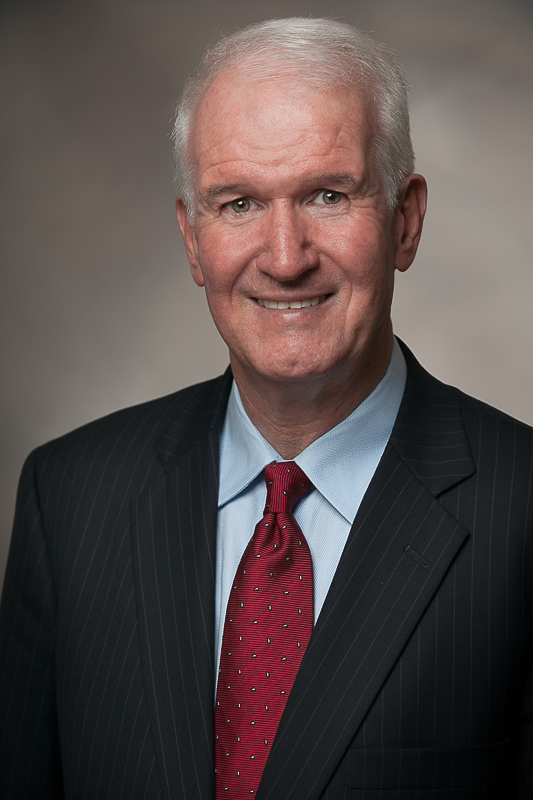

168th Speaker of the New Jersey General Assembly
- In office January 10, 2006 – January 12, 2010
- Governor: Richard Codey; Jon Corzine
- Preceded by: Albio Sires
- Succeeded by: Sheila Oliver

Member of the New Jersey General Assembly from the 5th district
- In office July 28, 1987 – January 12, 2010
- Preceded by: Francis J. Gorman
- Succeeded by: Angel Fuentes; Donald Norcross

Personal details
- Born: July 14, 1952 (age 74)
- Party: Democratic
- Education: Rutgers University (B.A.); University of Pennsylvania (M.A.)

Joseph J. Roberts (born July 14, 1952) is an American Democratic Party politician who served in the New Jersey General Assembly from 1987 to 2010, where he represented the 5th Legislative District. He was Speaker of the Assembly (2006–2010).

== Early life and education ==
Roberts was born in Philadelphia, Pennsylvania, and grew up in Bellmawr, New Jersey. His parents were Joseph Roberts Sr. and Margaret O'Donnell. Roberts attended Bishop Eustace Preparatory School in Pennsauken Township, New Jersey. He graduated with a B.A. in political science from Rutgers University and received an M.A. in Government Administration from the Fels Institute of Government at the University of Pennsylvania.

== Early political career (1977-2006) ==
Roberts served on the Board of Education of the Bellmawr School District from 1976 to 1977 and on the Bellmawr Borough Council from 1977 to 1980. From 1979 to 1984 he served as an assistant to then Congressman James J. Florio. He served on the Camden County Board of Chosen Freeholders from 1980 to 1987 and was the freeholder director during four of those years.

Roberts was first elected to the General Assembly in 1987. He served as Assistant Minority Leader from 1994 to 1995, Minority Budget Officer from 1996 to 1998, and Majority Leader from 2002 to 2006. He has served as a member of the Democratic National Committee and also served as Chairman of the New Jersey State Democratic Committee from 2001 to 2002.

== Speaker of New Jersey General Assembly (2007-10) ==
Roberts served as Speaker of the New Jersey General Assembly from 2007 to 2010. Speaker Roberts sponsored more than a dozen bills to promote autism awareness and to require therapeutic services to be provided to autistic children and young adults. He spearheaded legislation aimed at curbing medical malpractice costs and preserving patient's rights and access to health care.

Speaker Roberts sponsored the 2004 law that made New Jersey the fifth state to recognize domestic partnerships. He also authored legislation to revitalize the city of Camden and laws to encourage school districts and municipalities to consolidate and share services. As speaker, Roberts advanced the passage of comprehensive campaign finance and ethics reforms including a measure that provided for public financing in legislative elections in 2005 and 2007.

On September 2, 2009, Roberts announced he would not seek re-election to his Assembly seat. Sheila Oliver, who had been the chair of the Assembly Human Services Committee, succeeded Roberts as Speaker. Roberts served a total of 11 terms in the New Jersey General Assembly.

== Business career ==
Roberts was the owner/operator of hospitality properties in Cape May County, New Jersey, from 1984 to 2004. Roberts is a long time homeowner in Sea Isle City, New Jersey.

Roberts was the vice-chairman of US Vision, an optical services company from 2002 to 2004.

== Boards and non-profit activity ==
Roberts has served as president of Big Brothers-Big Sisters of Camden County and as a director of the United Way of Camden County. He was a member of the Rutgers University Board of Governors from 2010 to 2015. Roberts currently serves as a member of the Board of Directors of Horizon Blue Cross Blue Shield of New Jersey.

New Jersey General Assembly
Preceded by Francis J. Gorman	New Jersey State Assemblyman - District 5 July 28, 1987 – January 12, 2010; Served alongside: Wayne R. Bryant, Nilsa Cruz-Perez	Succeeded by Angel Fuentes; Donald Norcross
Political offices
Preceded by Paul DiGaetano	Majority Leader of the New Jersey General Assembly; 2002 – 2006	Succeeded by Bonnie Watson Coleman
Preceded by Albio Sires	Speaker of the New Jersey General Assembly; 2006 – 2010	Succeeded by Sheila Oliver
Party political offices
Preceded by Thomas P. Giblin	Chairman of the New Jersey Democratic State Committee; June 2001 – January 2002	Succeeded by Bonnie Watson Coleman
