= Eugene J. Bedell =

American politician

Member of the New Jersey Senate from the 12th district
- In office January 8, 1974 – January 12, 1982
- Preceded by: Joseph Azzolina
- Succeeded by: John P. Gallagher

Member of the New Jersey General Assembly from District 5B
- In office January 11, 1972 – January 8, 1974
- Preceded by: Joseph Azzolina; James M. Coleman
- Succeeded by: District abolished

Personal details
- Born: May 13, 1928 Elizabeth, New Jersey, U.S.
- Died: January 4, 2016 (aged 87) Keansburg, New Jersey, U.S.
- Party: Democratic

Eugene "Gene" J. Bedell (May 13, 1928 – January 4, 2016) was an American union organizer and Democratic Party politician who represented parts of Monmouth County, New Jersey in the New Jersey legislature from 1972 to 1982. In the legislature, he was a sponsor of state workers' compensation legislation and regulations on lobbying and campaign finance.

He served in the New Jersey General Assembly from 1972 to 1974 from District 5B and in the New Jersey Senate from the 12th district from 1974 to 1982.

== Early life and education ==
Eugene J. Bedell was born on May 13, 1928 in Elizabeth, New Jersey. His parents were Eugene and Margaret Bedell.

Bedell moved to Keansburg, New Jersey as a teenager. He served in the United States Army Medical Corps during World War II. He graduated in 1946 from Leonardo High School and attended Monmouth University (then Monmouth College) on the G.I. Bill. As a young man, Bedell play semiprofessional American football for the Leonardo Field Club and the Asbury Park Yellow Jackets.

== Political career ==
Bedell was the business agent for the Lathers International Union, Local 346 of the AFL-CIO and a member of the Carpenters Union, Local 2250.

In 1964, Bedell was elected as a Monmouth County freeholder, defeating Republican incumbent Abram Voorhees by about 325 votes, helped by the coattail effect in the landslide election of President Lyndon B. Johnson. He was the first Democratic freeholder in Monmouth County in forty years and one of two Democratic officials elected in that year, the first for any local office since 1936. During his term in office, Monmouth completed the initial phases of Brookdale Community College and the construction of the eastern branch of the Monmouth County Library.

=== New Jersey General Assembly ===
In 1971, Bedell ran for the New Jersey General Assembly, seeking the new District 5B seat in eastern Monmouth County. He was the first Democratic candidate to defeat an incumbent Republican assemblyman in fifty years. As an assemblyman, Bedell led opposition to proposals for a state income tax. In 1973, Bedell was reported on behalf of the Joint Appropriations Committee report on state revenues from the New Jersey Lottery; he reported that the lottery had generated $120 million in net proceeds, including a surplus of $62.4 million from the prior year and that $111 million had been spent on education and other public institutions.

=== New Jersey Senate ===
In 1973, Bedell was elected to the New Jersey Senate as part of the Democratic wave in the wake of the Watergate scandal. He unseated incumbent senator Joseph Azzolina in the 12th district, which included Monroe, Old Bridge, and Middletown. He was re-elected in 1977 by a record margin. He served as the chair of the Senate Committee on Labor, Industry, and Professions, where he was an architect of the state's workers' compensation legislation. As a senator, Bedell continued to lead opposition to the state income tax proposed by Governor Brendan Byrne. In 1975, Bedell charged that the governor's advisors had offered him hurricane protection and increased state aid for his district in exchange for a vote in support of the tax, and he had rejected the offers. In response, attorney general William F. Hyland publicly accused Bedell of libel.

In 1975, Bedell led hearings into state hiring practices which subpoenaed state employees who claimed that they had been bypassed for promotion.

In 1980, Bedell supported Ted Kennedy over incumbent Jimmy Carter in the New Jersey presidential primary.

In 1981, Bedell proposed a legislative investigation into the Beachview Rest Home fire, which killed at least 20 persons after the New Jersey Department of Health waived standard sprinkler requirements, although Bedell suggested sprinklers would not have been "that useful in a situation like this," since "most of the victims usually die from smoke."

In 1981, Bedell sponsored laws to require lobbyists to file annual financial reports with the Election Law Enforcement Commission, while continuing to require lobbyists to register and file quarterly reports with the office of the Attorney General. The laws also clarified that lobbyists' expenses would be reportable even if not used "expressly for" lobbying.

Following redistricting which removed Monroe Township from his district, Bedell was defeated for re-election in 1981 by Republican investment banker and former Highway Authority director John P. Gallagher.

=== Later career ===
In 1989, he was appointed to fill a Democratic vacancy on the Monmouth County Board of Freeholders. He later served as borough manager of Keansburg and city administrator of Long Branch and Seaside Park in Ocean County.

== Personal life and death ==
Bedell married Arline Mayer. They had two sons and four daughters.

Bedell was a member of the American Legion, Monmouth County Mental Health Association, the Red Cross, and the regional board of the United Counties Trust.

He was an avid fan of the New York Giants. When the Giants were set to move to a new stadium in East Rutherford, New Jersey, Bedell sponsored a 1974 resolution in the state senate asking the team to change their name.

He died on January 4, 2016, at age 87 in his home in Keansburg.
