= Rob Andrews =

American politician (born 1957)

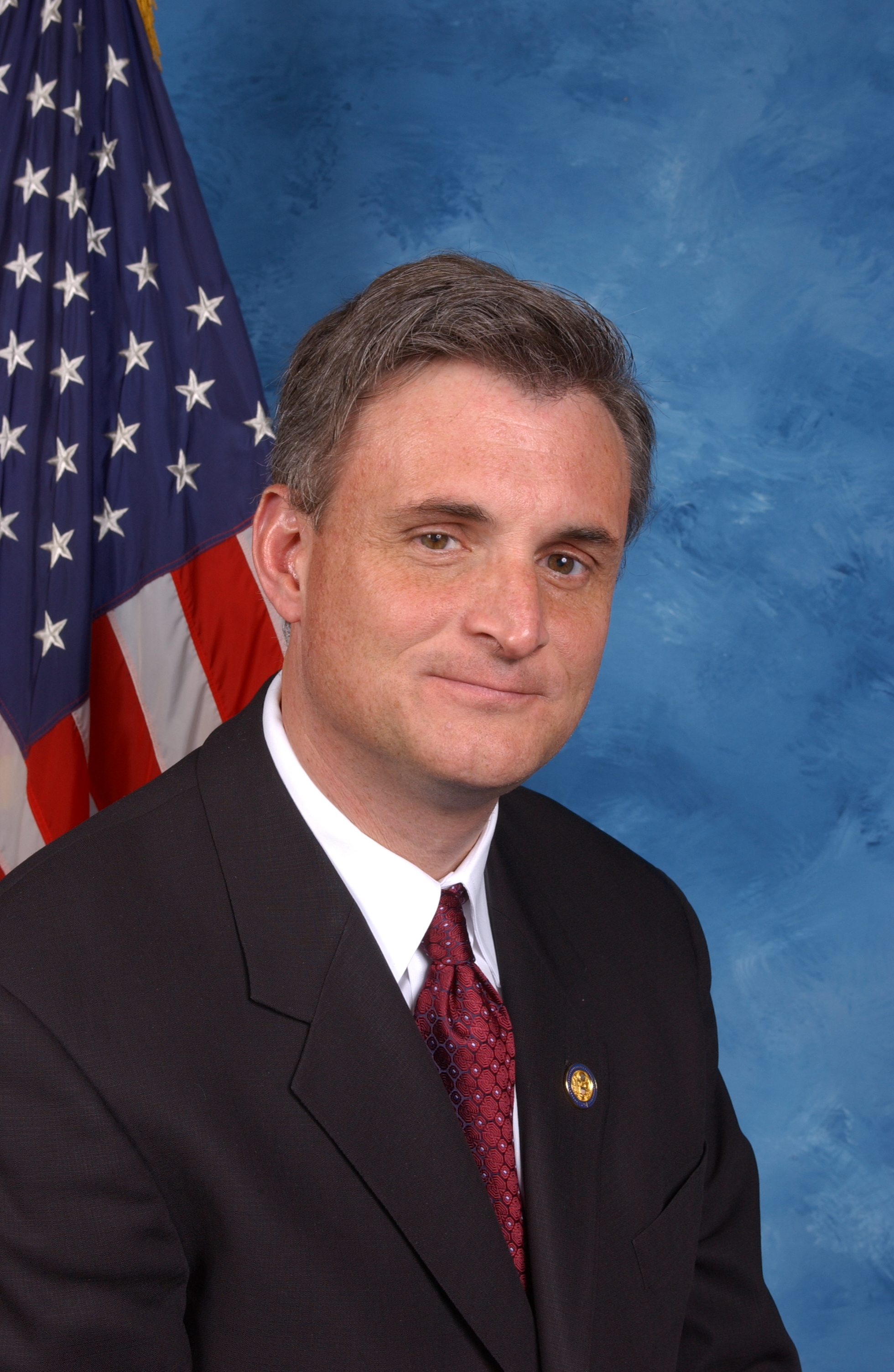

Member of the U.S. House of Representatives from New Jersey's 1st district
- In office November 6, 1990 – February 18, 2014 (Note: Andrews's official service begins on the date of the special election, while the House was adjourned sine die until the start of the next Congress on January 3, 1991.)
- Preceded by: James Florio
- Succeeded by: Donald Norcross

Personal details
- Born: Robert Ernest Andrews; August 4, 1957 (age 69) Camden, New Jersey, U.S.
- Party: Democratic
- Spouse: Camille Spinello
- Children: 2
- Education: Bucknell University (BA); Cornell University (JD)

Robert Ernest Andrews (born August 4, 1957) is an American politician who served as a U.S. representative for New Jersey's 1st congressional district from 1990 to 2014. The district included most of Camden County and parts of Burlington County and Gloucester County. He is a member of the Democratic Party.

== Early life, education, and early career ==
Andrews was born in Camden, New Jersey, the son of Josephine (née Amies) and Ernest Andrews; he is predominantly of Scottish and Scotch-Irish descent and counts American portrait painter Charles Willson Peale and Johannes Roosevelt among his ancestors. He grew up in Bellmawr and attended Triton Regional High School in Runnemede. Andrews was the first in his family to attend college, graduating from Bucknell University in 1979 with a BA in political science, summa cum laude. He later attended Cornell Law School, earning his JD degree with honors in 1982. Before his election to Congress, Andrews was involved in legal education as a member of Cornell Law Review‍‍ '‍s board of editors.

He worked as an attorney and an adjunct professor at the Rutgers School of Law–Camden. Starting in 1983, Andrews operated a private legal practice. In 1986, he was elected as a member of the Camden County Board of Chosen Freeholders, where he served for four years, including two years as freeholder director (1988–1990).

== U.S. House of Representatives ==
First elected to Congress in 1990, Andrews served for 24 years as the U.S. representative for New Jersey's 1st congressional district, which includes most of Camden County and parts of Burlington County and Gloucester County. In the U.S. House of Representatives, he served on the Committee on Armed Services, Committee on the Budget, and Committee on Education and Labor, where he served as chairman of the Subcommittee on Health, Employment, Labor, and Pensions.

=== Elections ===
In 1990, after 15-year incumbent Democratic U.S. Congressman James Florio resigned from the U.S. House of Representatives to take office as Governor of New Jersey, Andrews won the 1990 special election and simultaneous general election against Gloucester County Freeholder Daniel J. Mangini. He subsequently won re-election every two years until his retirement. Andrews had the 10th longest tenure among U.S. Representatives in New Jersey history, and the fifth longest among Democrats in the state. In November 2004, he received more votes than anyone ever elected to the U.S. House from New Jersey, a record which he broke again in 2008 and 2012.

=== Committee assignments ===
- Committee on Armed Services
  - Subcommittee on Strategic Forces
  - Subcommittee on Emerging Threats and Capabilities
- Committee on Education and the Workforce
  - Subcommittee on Higher Education and Workforce Training
  - Subcommittee on Health, Employment, Labor, and Pensions (Ranking Member)
- Co-Chairman of the Steering and Policy Committee

=== Caucus memberships ===
- Congressional Arts Caucus
- Congressional Fire Services Caucus
- Hunger Caucus

=== Tenure ===
The New York Times characterized Andrews as "fiscally conservative but socially moderate." He has a lifetime rating of 17.24 from the American Conservative Union and a 2007 rating of 100 from Americans for Democratic Action. He has a liberal rating of 76.2 and a conservative rating of 23.8 from the National Journal.

According to President Barack Obama, he was an original author of the Affordable Care Act.

=== Alleged misuse of campaign funds ===
On December 2, 2008, the Citizens for Responsibility and Ethics in Washington (CREW) filed a complaint against Andrews and four other politicians to the Federal Election Commission (FEC) for allegedly violating the Federal Election Campaign Act (FECA). In the complaint, CREW stated that Andrews's campaign committee spent $952.04 of campaign funds on clothing, which FECA classified as personal spending. A spokesman for Andrews responded that the clothing was intended to replace lost luggage from a flight, and that Andrews deposited $952.04 into his campaign account after the airline reimbursed him. The FEC dismissed the complaint on July 16, 2009, but affirmed in the dismissal that the purchases violated campaign finance laws.

The Star-Ledger reported on November 20, 2011, that Andrews financed a family vacation to Edinburgh, Scotland, and other European destinations with over $9,000 of campaign funds. The report claimed that Andrews "mixed personal and political expenses in an unorthodox way" on multiple occasions. These expenses included a $10,000 house party celebrating both his career anniversary and his daughter's graduation, a $12,500 donation to the Walnut Street Theatre – where his daughter performed, and trips to California that overlapped with his daughter's auditions. Andrews and his chief of staff replied that the vacation involved attending an adviser's wedding, the party was primarily for "political associates", the theater donation was in support of its outreach program, and his daughter assisted him with fundraising during their trips.

CREW filed another compliant with the FEC on November 30, 2011, based on The Star-Ledger's article. Andrews described the complaint as "baseless" and stated, "The campaign has fully complied with all laws with respect to the proper expenditure and disclosure of campaign funds. All personal aspects of any expenditures or activities have always been paid in full from our family's personal funds." The Associated Press elaborated on March 28, 2012, that Andrews's 18 trips to California from 2007 to 2012 resulted in over $97,000 of campaign expenses and $260,000 of donations, short of the 3:1 ratio of donations to expenses that is expected from political fundraising trips.

The United States House Committee on Ethics started researching the complaint on July 17, 2012, and decided on August 31 that it would proceed with an investigation. On March 19, 2013, the Committee declared that a special panel would examine whether Andrews's travel expenses from the Edinburgh and California trips complied with campaign finance laws. Andrews resigned from Congress on February 4, 2014. He said that the campaign finance probe had "no role at all" in his resignation, and that he was departing for a position at the Dilworth Paxson law firm. The FEC dismissed the complaint on June 3, 2014, with "prosecutorial discretion", noting that Andrews reimbursed his campaign for the Edinburgh trip before he received the complaint, and that any violations in the California trips were "relatively small". The complaint was dismissed in June 2014.

== Other political activities ==
In 1997, Andrews ran for Governor of New Jersey. In the Democratic primary, he was defeated 40%–37%, a margin of 9,993 votes, by State Senator Jim McGreevey. Andrews was a candidate for the Democratic nomination in the 2008 U.S. Senate election. Andrews lost to incumbent Frank Lautenberg, but subsequently won re-election to his House seat, with Andrews "[receiving] more votes in November 2008 than anyone ever elected to the U.S. House in New Jersey, breaking his own record."

== Personal life ==
Andrews is married and has two daughters. He is an Episcopalian.

== Electoral history ==
New Jersey's 1st congressional district: Results 1990–2012
Year	Democrat	Votes	Pct	Republican	Votes	Pct	3rd Party	Party	Votes	Pct	3rd Party	Party	Votes	Pct	3rd Party	Party	Votes	Pct	3rd Party	Party	Votes	Pct
1990 (special)	Rob Andrews	71,373	55%	Daniel J. Mangini	58,087	45%																
1990	Rob Andrews	72,415	54%	Daniel J. Mangini	57,299	43%	Jerry Zeldin	Libertarian	1,592	1%	Walter E. Konstanty	Pride and Honesty	1,422	1%	William H. Harris	Populist	1,066	1%				
1992	Rob Andrews	153,525	67%	Lee A. Solomon	65,123	29%	James E. Smith	Pro-Life Pro-Family Veteran	3,761	2%	Jerry Zeldin	Libertarian	2,641	1%	Kenneth L. Lowndes	Pro-Life Independent Conservative	2,163	1%	Nicholas Pastuch	America First Populist	859	<1%
1994	Rob Andrews	108,155	72%	James N. Hogan	41,505	28%																
1996	Rob Andrews	160,413	76%	Mel Suplee	44,287	21%	Michael Edmondson	Independent	2,668	1%	Patricia A. Bily	Independent	1,873	1%	Norman E. Wahner	Independent	1,493	1%				
1998	Rob Andrews	90,279	73%	Ronald L. Richards	27,855	23%	David E. West, Jr.	Independent	1,684	1%	Joseph W. Stockman	Independent	1,324	1%	Edward Forchion	Independent	1,257	1%	James E. Barber	Independent	943	1%
2000	Rob Andrews	167,327	76%	Charlene Cathcart	46,455	21%	Catherine L. Parrish	Independent	3,090	1%	Edward Forchion	Independent	1,959	1%	Joseph A. Patalivo	Independent	781	<1%				
2002	Rob Andrews	121,846	93%	(no candidate)			Timothy Haas	Libertarian	9,543	7%												
2004	Rob Andrews	201,163	75%	S. Daniel Hutchison	66,109	25%	Arturo F. Croce	E Pluribus Unum	931	<1%												
2006	Rob Andrews	140,110	100%	(no candidate)																		
2008	Rob Andrews	191,796	72%	Dale M. Glading	70,466	26%	Matthew Thieke	Green	1,778	<1%	Margaret Chapman	Back to Basics	1,188	<1%	Everitt M. Williams, III	Think Independently	954	<1%	Alvin Lindsay	Lindsay for Congress	483	<1%
2010	Rob Andrews	106,334	63%	Dale M. Glading	58,562	35%	Mark Heacock	Green	1,593	<1%	Margaret Chapman	Time for Change	1,257	<1%	Nicky I. Petrutz	Defend American Constitution	521	<1%				
2012	Rob Andrews	210,470	68%	Gregory W. Horton	92,459	30%	John William Reitter	Green	4,413	1%	Margaret Chapman	Reform Party	1,177	<1%								

U.S. House of Representatives
Preceded by James Florio	Member of the U.S. House of Representatives from New Jersey's 1st congressional district 1990–2014	Succeeded by Donald Norcross
Party political offices
Preceded by George Miller	Chair of the House Democratic Policy Committee; 2013–2014	Succeeded by George Miller
U.S. order of precedence (ceremonial)
Preceded by Jim Saxton as Former U.S. Representative	Order of precedence of the United States as Former U.S. Representative	Succeeded by Rodney Frelinghuysen as Former U.S. Representative
