= Wayne R. Bryant =

American politician (born 1947)

Member of the New Jersey Senate from the 5th district
- In office February 9, 1995 – January 8, 2008
- Preceded by: Walter Rand
- Succeeded by: Dana Redd

Member of the New Jersey General Assembly from the 5th district
- In office January 12, 1982 – February 9, 1995 Serving with Francis J. Gorman and Joseph J. Roberts
- Preceded by: Walter Rand; Ernest F. Schuck
- Succeeded by: Nilsa Cruz-Perez

Personal details
- Born: November 7, 1947 (age 78) Camden, New Jersey, U.S.
- Party: Democratic

Wayne R. Bryant (born November 7, 1947) is an American Democratic Party politician, who served in the New Jersey State Senate from 1995 to 2008, where he represented the 5th Legislative District. He was also convicted of corruption. Before entering the Senate, Bryant served in New Jersey's lower house, the General Assembly, from 1982 to 1995 and on the Camden County Board of Chosen Freeholders from 1980 to 1982.

== Early life and family ==
Bryant was born and raised in the predominantly African American community of Lawnside, New Jersey. His father, Isaac Rutledge Bryant, was president of the Lawnside school board for fourteen years. His uncle, Horace J. Bryant, was the first African American to serve in a State Cabinet position in New Jersey. His grandfather served as the New Jersey General Assembly's first African American calendar clerk, responsible for billing and scheduling. He has two brothers, Isaac and Mark; Mark Bryant served as mayor of Lawnside.

== Political career ==
While in the General Assembly, Bryant served as Majority Leader from 1990 to 1991. Upon the death of longtime Democratic senator Walter Rand on January 6, 1995, Bryant was selected to serve the remaining term, and served in the State Senate until 2008; Nilsa Cruz-Perez was selected to fill Bryant's seat in the Assembly. Bryant served as a delegate to the Democratic National Convention on four occasions, in 1992, 1996, 2000 and 2004.

Bryant has been an Attorney at the law firm of Zeller & Bryant, L.L.P. The firm announced in an advertisement in the February 12, 2007, edition of the New Jersey Law Journal that Bryant would be retiring from the firm after 33 years, effective March 1, 2007. Bryant is the former chairman of the Senate Budget & Appropriations Committee, and the Joint Budget Oversight Committee. He also serves as a member of the Education Committee, the Joint Committee on Public Schools, and the Intergovernmental Relations Committee.

== Controversy and indictment ==
Bryant has been referred to as the "king of double dipping" by a newspaper in southern New Jersey because he has collected salaries from as many as four public jobs he held simultaneously in New Jersey. Between Bryant, his two brothers, his wife, his son and his sister-in-law, the family holds ten public jobs in New Jersey and earns almost $700,000.

On April 20, 2006, it was reported on the website Politics NJ that Bryant found his son, Wayne Bryant, Jr., dead in his home. Bryant's son worked for the New Jersey Network Television Station, and had won two Emmy awards.

On September 18, 2006, a federal monitor's report charged Bryant with pressuring officials at the University of Medicine and Dentistry of New Jersey to hire him for a no-show job for which he received a $35,000 annual salary. In his position as chairman of the Senate Budget Committee, Bryant delivered a total of $12.8 million in state aid to the school during the three years covered by the no-show job. As of September 25, 2006, Bryant stepped down from his position as chairman of the Senate budget committee — and resigned from the committee entirely — amid increasing pressure from legislative leaders. The probe against Bryant expanded, and state and federal investigators at the U.S. Attorney's Office for the District of New Jersey demanded records from several public institutions and agencies where Bryant or his law firm, Zeller & Bryant, have worked. One of the notable places was Rutgers University Camden where Bryant received over $130,000 for teaching law school classes. This salary was considered suspicious, as the Rutgers Camden Law School was lobbying and received $11 million from the Camden City Redevelopment fund which Bryant was involved with.

On March 29, 2007, Bryant was indicted on corruption charges for his alleged involvement in funneling millions to the University of Medicine and Dentistry of New Jersey in exchange for a no-show job allegedly provided by R. Michael Gallagher, the former dean at UMDNJ's School of Osteopathic Medicine who has also been indicted with Bryant. He also faces charges of mail fraud, wire fraud, and bribery because of his acceptance of salary from the University of Medicine and Dentistry, Rutgers University-Camden, and Gloucester County Board of Social Service while doing very little work.

On November 18, 2008, Bryant was convicted on all counts. On July 24, 2009, District Judge Freda L. Wolfson sentenced Bryant to four years in federal prison.
