= Daniel Dalton (American politician) =

American politician (born 1949)

Secretary of State of New Jersey
- In office January 31, 1992 – January 18, 1994
- Governor: James Florio
- Preceded by: Joan M. Haberle
- Succeeded by: Lonna R. Hooks

Member of the New Jersey Senate from the 4th district
- In office January 12, 1982 – January 14, 1992
- Preceded by: Joseph A. Maressa
- Succeeded by: John J. Matheussen

Member of the New Jersey General Assembly from the 4th district
- In office January 8, 1980 – January 12, 1982 Serving with Dennis L. Riley
- Preceded by: Kenneth A. Gewertz; Francis J. Gorman
- Succeeded by: Anthony S. Marsella

Personal details
- Born: August 8, 1949 (age 77) Woodbury, New Jersey, U.S.
- Party: Democratic
- Spouse: Suzanne Garvey
- Children: 4
- Education: Kings College (1971); University of Memphis (1974)

Daniel J. Dalton (born August 8, 1949) is an American Democratic Party politician who served as New Jersey Senate Majority Leader and as Secretary of State of New Jersey.

== Personal life ==
Born on August 8, 1949, in Woodbury, he is the son of William Lawrence Dalton and Margaret Mary Dalton, the fourth of the family's eight children. His father had been elected to serve as mayor in Glassboro, New Jersey and as a member of the Gloucester County Board of Chosen Freeholders, as well as being the Democratic Party chairman in Gloucester County. His brother, Sean F. Dalton, represented the 4th District in the General Assembly for two terms, from 1994 to 1997.

Raised in Glassboro, Dalton graduated in 1967 from Gloucester Catholic High School. He earned a bachelor's degree in 1971 from Kings College in Wilkes-Barre, Pennsylvania and a Master of Public Administration degree in 1974 from Memphis State University (now the University of Memphis).

After serving with the Peace Corps in Africa in 1971, Dalton taught and coached for the two subsequent years at a school in Williamstown, before a two-year stint at the Department of Labor and Industry. From February 1975 through late 1978, he worked in the Washington, D.C. offices of then-Congressman James Florio, who he had met in the early 1970s while Florio was serving as a member of the General Assembly and aspiring to run for Congress. Dalton had been involved in Florio's bid against Republican John E. Hunt in 1972 for a seat representing New Jersey's 1st congressional district, losing as part of the landslide election of President Richard Nixon. Having completed graduate school, Dalton worked as a full-time staffer as part of Florio's successful congressional campaign in November 1974 in the wake of the Watergate scandal. He moved to Maryland and worked typing replies to constituent correspondence and attending subcommittee meetings related to Florio's service on the Commerce Committee, gaining what he later called "the greatest education I've ever had".

From 1994 until 2007, Dalton headed the Dalton Insurance Agency in Glassboro, a firm owned by his father that he joined in 1978 as an agent. A resident of Clayton, he was appointed a member of the Kennedy University Hospital Board of Trustees.

Married to Suzanne (Loughrey), Dalton has four children.

== Public service ==
In 1979, Florio, then a Congressman, encouraged Dalton and Dennis L. Riley to run in the June primary under the label of the "Florio Democratic Team" against three-term incumbents Kenneth A. Gewertz and Francis J. Gorman, who had the support of Angelo Errichetti and the Camden County Democratic Organization. Dalton (with 31.3% of the vote) and Riley (with 28.3%) won the two ballot spots in the primary balloting.

Dalton and his Democratic running mate Dennis Riley were elected in the November 1979 general election to represent the 4th District in the General Assembly, which covered portions of Burlington County, Camden County and Gloucester County. During his single term in the Assembly, Dalton focused on environmental legislation, sponsoring bills that established statewide requirements for recycling and dealing with issues related to the many landfills in the district. Governor Brendan Byrne signed a bill into law in September 1981 that Dalton had sponsored, creating a $6 million fund to be used towards municipal recycling programs, to be funded by a tax on landfills.

With Burlington County removed from the 4th District and portions of Atlantic County added in redistricting following the 1980 United States census, Riley ran for election to a two-year term in the New Jersey Senate for the seat that had been held by Democrat Joseph A. Maressa, who chose not to run for office in the wake of the Abscam scandal, defeating Kenneth A. Gewertz in the June Democratic Party primary. In the November 1981 general election, Dalton defeated Republican Frank B. Smith by a 63%-37% margin; he went on to be reelected to four-year terms in the Senate in 1983 and 1987.

Dalton was chosen as Chairman of the Energy and Environment Committee, focusing on an issue that he felt was important both statewide and particularly in his own district. During his first term in the Senate, Dalton pushed for passage of the "Worker and Community Right to Know" law, which requires notification and details of chemicals and other toxic substances used in the workplace. Dalton was chosen to be the majority leader in 1990 and was tasked with leading the enactment of several initiatives pushed by Governor Florio, including the creation of the Joint Underwriting Association, an insurance pool for high-risk drivers that ended up insuring a significant portion of all New Jersey drivers, passage of the Quality Education Act, which increased school aid for students in urban districts, as well as income tax increases and an assault weapons ban.

After leaving elected office, having chosen not to run for re-election so that he could spend more time with his family, Dalton was nominated in 1992 by Governor Jim Florio to serve as New Jersey Secretary of State, succeeding Joan M. Haberle, with the commitment from the governor that the role of Secretary of State would be enlarged and that he would be given the opportunity to work with other advisors to the governor regarding policy issues. He served in the position until January 18, 1994, when he was succeeded by Lonna Hooks.

Political offices
Preceded by Joan Haberle	Secretary of State of New Jersey; 1992–1994	Succeeded by Lonna Hooks
