= Donald Norcross =

American politician (born 1958)

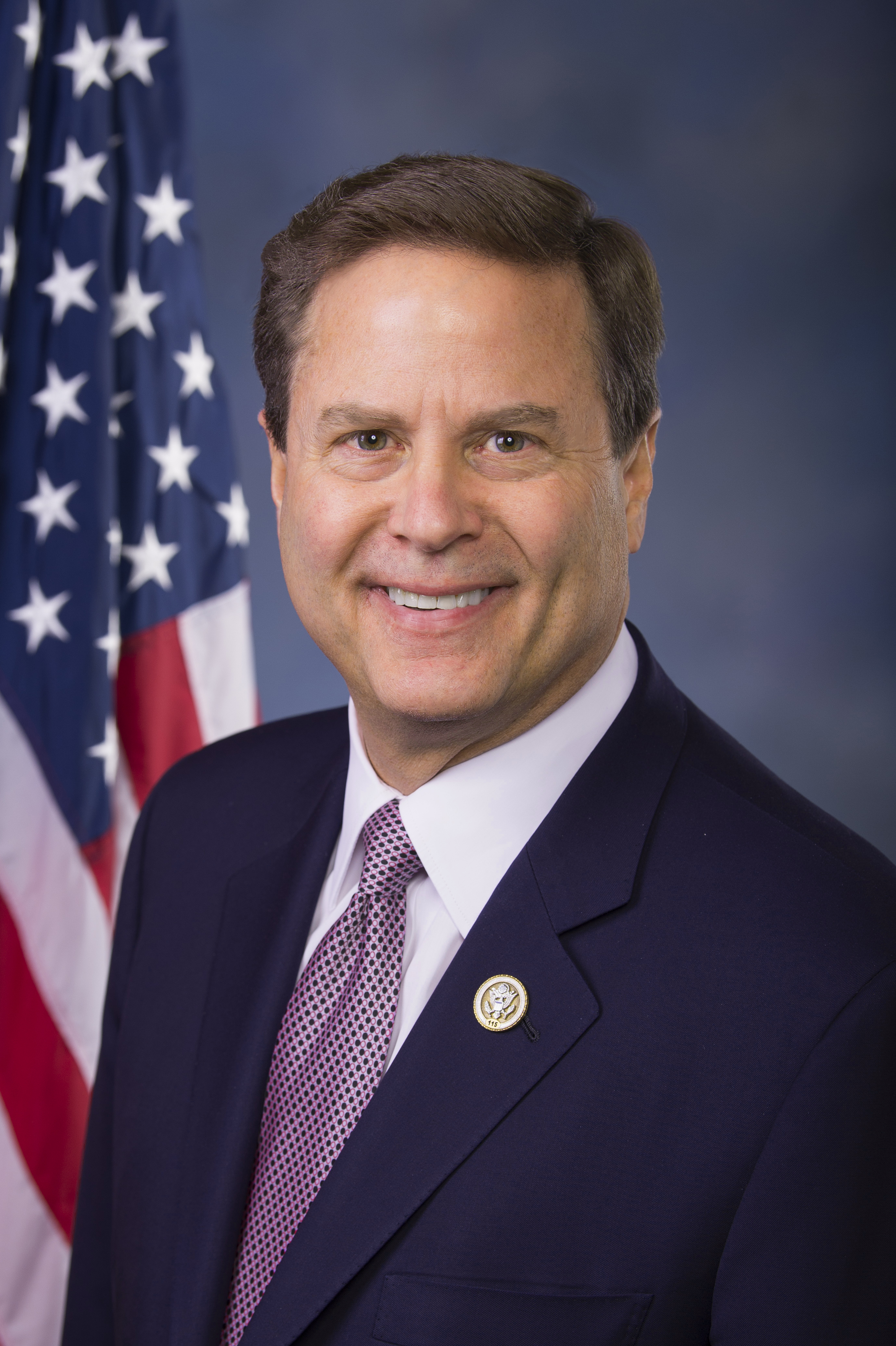
- Official portrait, 2017

Member of the U.S. House of Representatives from New Jersey's 1st district
- Incumbent
- Assumed office November 4, 2014 (Note: Norcross's official service begins on the date of the special election, while he was not sworn in until November 12, 2014.)
- Preceded by: Rob Andrews

Member of the New Jersey Senate from the 5th district
- In office January 19, 2010 – November 12, 2014
- Preceded by: Dana L. Redd
- Succeeded by: Nilsa Cruz-Perez

Member of the New Jersey General Assembly from the 5th district
- In office January 12, 2010 – January 19, 2010
- Preceded by: Nilsa Cruz-Perez; Joseph J. Roberts
- Succeeded by: Whip Wilson

Personal details
- Born: December 13, 1958 (age 67) Camden, New Jersey, U.S.
- Party: Democratic
- Spouse: Andrea Doran
- Children: 3
- Relatives: George Norcross (brother); John C. Norcross (brother)
- Education: Camden County College (AS); Rutgers University, Camden (attended)
- Website: House website Campaign website
- Norcross's voice Norcross on South Jersey's Sikh community and the 1984 anti-Sikh riots Recorded November 16, 2022

Donald W. Norcross (born December 13, 1958) is an American politician and labor leader who is the U.S. representative for New Jersey's 1st congressional district in South Jersey. A member of the Democratic Party, Norcross was first elected to this congressional seat in 2014, following the resignation of Rob Andrews. His district covers much of the New Jersey side of the Philadelphia metropolitan area, including Camden, Cherry Hill, Lindenwold, and Glassboro.

Before entering electoral politics, Norcross was involved in the leadership of the International Brotherhood of Electrical Workers Local 351 and was president of the Southern New Jersey AFL-CIO Central Labor Council. He was elected to the New Jersey General Assembly in 2009 and soon after his term began in January 2010, he was appointed to fill a vacancy in the New Jersey State Senate, where he remained until being elected to the House of Representatives.

Norcross is a member of the committees on Armed Services as well as Education and Labor. He is a member of the Congressional Progressive Caucus and the New Democrat Coalition, and is a founding member of the Bipartisan Building Trades Caucus.

== Early life and education ==
Norcross was born on December 13, 1958, in Camden, New Jersey, the son of George E. Norcross Jr. and the brother of George E. Norcross III and John C. Norcross. He and his three brothers grew up in Pennsauken Township. He graduated from Camden County College with a degree in criminal justice and attended Rutgers University-Camden. He grew up in the Lutheran faith.

== Career ==
In 1980, Norcross served as an apprentice in the International Brotherhood of Electrical Workers, eventually becoming assistant business manager of the IBEW Local 351. A former president of the Southern New Jersey Building Trades Council, he served as president of the Southern New Jersey AFL-CIO Central Labor Council for 16 years.

Norcross and his running mate, Camden City Council President Angel Fuentes, were elected to the Assembly in 2009 after Democratic incumbents Nilsa Cruz-Perez and Joseph J. Roberts both retired. Shortly thereafter, Norcross was appointed to the Senate seat vacated by Dana Redd, who was elected mayor of Camden. Norcross won the Senate special election in 2010 to finish out the term, then was reelected to the New Jersey Senate in 2011 and 2013.

== U.S. House of Representatives ==
=== 2014 Election ===
On February 4, 2014, Congressman Rob Andrews, who had represented the 1st District since 1990, announced he would resign from Congress by the end of the month. He did so on February 18.

Norcross announced his candidacy on February 5, and within a week he was endorsed by every New Jersey congressional Democrat, State Senate President Stephen Sweeney, General Assembly Majority Leader Louis Greenwald, Mayor of Camden Dana Redd, U.S. Senator Cory Booker, and former Governor Jim Florio (who represented the 1st from 1975 to 1990).

Norcross won the Democratic primary—the real contest in what has long been a very safely Democratic district—with 72% of the vote. He ran in two elections on November 4: a special election for the balance of Andrews's term, and a regular election for a full two-year term. He easily won both over Republican challenger Garry Cobb. He was sworn in on November 12 by House Speaker John Boehner. Since he was added to the House roll on that date, he gained more seniority than other members of the House freshman class of 2014.

=== Tenure ===
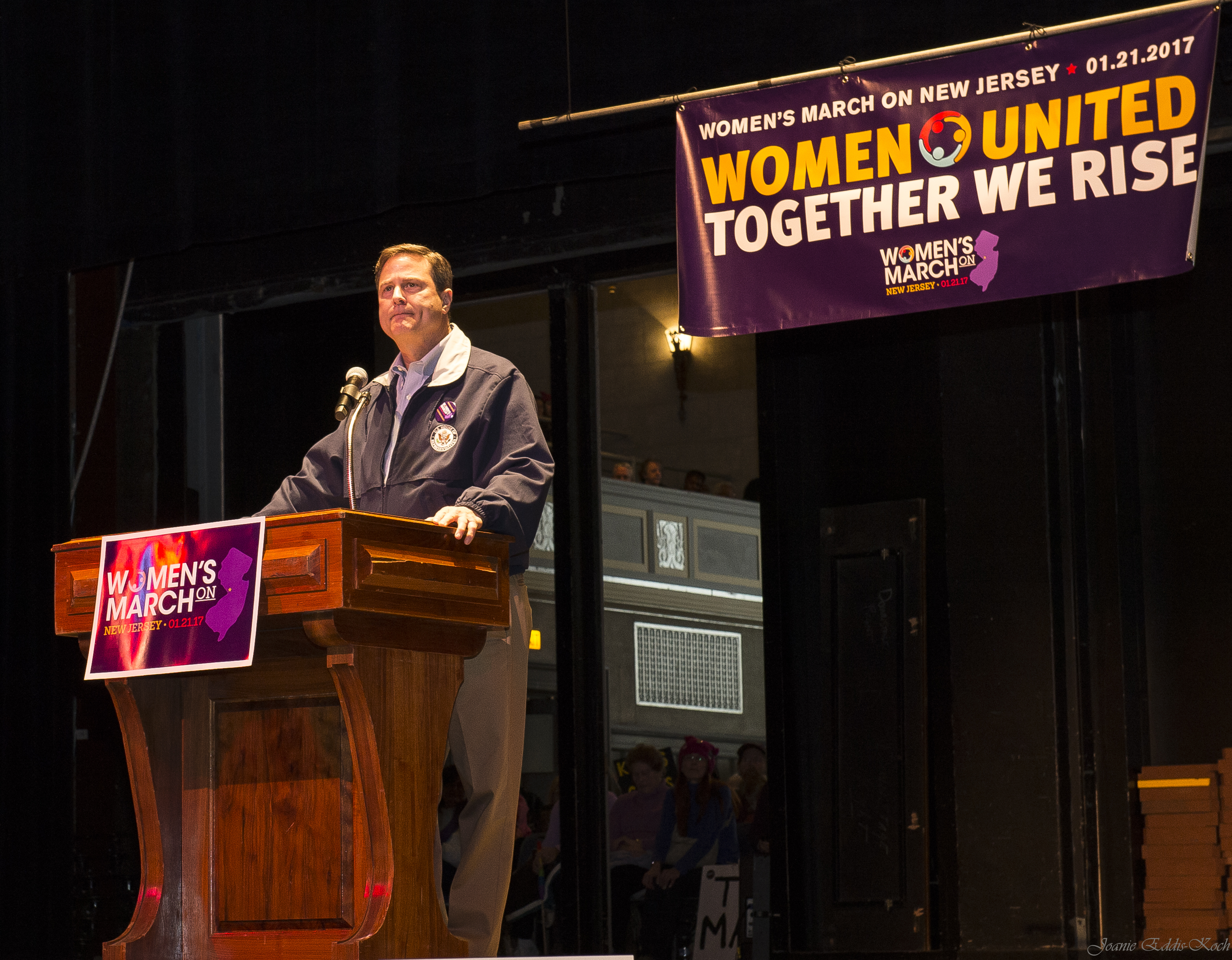
Norcross speaking at the 2017 Women's March in Trenton, New Jersey

Soon after his election, Norcross was appointed assistant whip, a role he reprised after his 2016 reelection. He serves in a number of leadership roles in the Democratic Caucus, including co-chair of the Rebuilding America Task Force, member of the Steering and Policy Committee, and member of the Communications Committee. He is the co-founder of the Bipartisan Building Trades Caucus and vice chair of the Bipartisan Task Force to Combat the Heroin Epidemic, and was appointed to the Joint Select Committee on Pension Security.

In 2020, Norcross was mentioned as being a possible candidate for secretary of labor under President Joe Biden. On June 12, 2025, Norcross was one of the four Democrats who did not vote on the $9 billion spending cuts put forward by the Department of Government Efficiency; house Republicans passed the rescission package by 2 votes. On April 10, 2025, Norcross was the only Democrat who did not vote on the Safeguard American Voter Eligibility (SAVE) Act; the bill passed the house 220-208.

==== Hot mic incident ====
On June 24, 2021, during a remote United States House Committee on Education and Labor meeting over Zoom with Secretary of Education Miguel Cardona, Representative Bob Good was questioning Cardona when someone interrupted by shouting "racist!", while Norcross's name flashed on the screen, leading participants to believe that Norcross made the remark; a later report from Fox News explicitly attributed the outburst to Norcross. A letter signed by every Republican member of the committee demanded an apology from Committee Chairman Bobby Scott for what they considered a "slander" and a "smear" against Good. Scott responded by calling the outburst "inappropriate" and "out of order". Norcross did not publicly address the incident.

=== Committee assignments ===
For the 119th Congress:

- Committee on Armed Services
  - Subcommittee on Seapower and Projection Forces
  - Subcommittee on Tactical Air and Land Forces (Ranking Member)
- Committee on Education and Workforce
  - Subcommittee on Health, Employment, Labor, and Pensions
  - Subcommittee on Higher Education and Workforce Development

=== Caucus memberships ===
- Founding member of the Bipartisan Building Trades Caucus
- Vice Chair of the Bipartisan Task Force to Combat the Heroin Epidemic
- Co-Chair of the Congressional Motorcycle Caucus
- Blue Collar Caucus
- Congressional Caucus for the Equal Rights Amendment
- Congressional Progressive Caucus
- Congressional Solar Caucus
- Congressional Equality Caucus
- New Democrat Coalition
- Problem Solvers Caucus
- Rare Disease Caucus
- Veterinary Medicine Caucus
- Labor Caucus

== Personal life ==
Norcross and Andrea Doran, an echocardiographer, are married and they have two children. Norcross also has a child by his first wife, Nancy. His brother George is a New Jersey Democratic leader and businessman. Donald has two other brothers, attorney Philip A. Norcross and John, a psychologist, author, and professor at the University of Scranton in Scranton, Pennsylvania. Norcross and Doran live in Camden.

On April 7, 2025, Donald Norcross fell ill from cholangitis while on a flight, and was hospitalized at UNC Rex Healthcare in Raleigh, North Carolina. He was then transferred to Cooper University Hospital in Camden, where he was treated for the infection, which had progressed to sepsis; Norcross later said that he was close to death during this period. On April 15, his office said that he was "responding well to treatment" but remained in the intensive care. He was discharged from the hospital on May 1, to start a period of rehabilitation. He briefly returned to Congress overnight from May 21–22, 2025, to vote against the One Big Beautiful Bill Act before resuming a full work schedule on June 23.

== Electoral history ==
=== New Jersey State Senate ===
New Jersey State Senate Special elections, 2010
| Party | Candidate | Votes | % |
|---|---|---|---|
| Democratic | Donald W. Norcross (incumbent) | 28,801 | 65.7 |
| Republican | Harry E. Trout | 15,041 | 34.3 |
| Democratic hold | | | |

New Jersey State Senate elections, 2011
| Party | Candidate | Votes | % |
|---|---|---|---|
| Democratic | Donald W. Norcross (incumbent) | 17,712 | 56.8 |
| Republican | Keith Walker | 13,444 | 43.2 |
| Democratic hold | | | |

=== U.S. House of Representatives ===
New Jersey's 1st congressional district: Results 2014–2024
| Year | Democratic | Votes | Pct | Republican | Votes | Pct | 3rd Party | Party | Votes | Pct | 3rd Party | Party | Votes | Pct | 3rd Party | Party | Votes | Pct | Notes |
|---|---|---|---|---|---|---|---|---|---|---|---|---|---|---|---|---|---|---|---|
| 2014 | Donald Norcross | 93,315 | 57.4 | Garry Cobb | 64,073 | 39.4 | Scot John Tomaszewski | Independent | 1,784 | 0.9 | Robert Shapiro | Independent | 1,384 | 0.7 | Margaret M. Chapman | Independent | 1,134 | 0.7 | (Note: Additional candidates in this election included independents Mike Berman with 634 votes (0.4%) and Donald E. Letton with 449 votes (0.3%).) |
| 2016 | Donald Norcross | 183,231 | 60.0 | Bob Patterson | 112,388 | 36.8 | Scot John Tomaszewski | Independent | 5,473 | 1.8 | William F. Sihr IV | Libertarian | 2,410 | 0.8 | Michael Berman | Independent | 1,971 | 0.7 | |
| 2018 | Donald Norcross | 169,628 | 64.4 | Paul E. Dilks | 87,617 | 33.3 | Robert Shapiro | Libertarian | 2,821 | 1.1 | Paul Hamlin | Independent | 2,368 | 0.9 | Mohammad Kabir | Independent | 984 | 0.4 | |
| 2020 | Donald Norcross | 240,567 | 62.5 | Claire Gustafson | 144,463 | 37.5 | | | | | | | | | | | | | |
| 2022 | Donald Norcross | 139,559 | 62.3 | Claire Gustafson | 78,794 | 35.2 | Patricia Kline | Independent | 3,343 | 1.5 | Isaiah Fletcher | Libertarian | 1,546 | 0.7 | Allen Cannon | Independent | 642 | 0.3 | |
| 2024 | Donald Norcross | 208,808 | 57.8 | Theodore Liddell | 144,390 | 40.0 | Robin Brownfield | Green | 5,771 | 1.6 | Austin Johnson | Independent | 2,091 | 0.6 | | | | | |

== Notes ==
U.S. House of Representatives
| Preceded by Rob Andrews | Member of the U.S. House of Representatives from New Jersey's 1st congressional district 2014–present | Incumbent |
U.S. order of precedence (ceremonial)
| Preceded by Alma Adams | United States representatives by seniority 123rd | Succeeded by Ed Case |
