= Livingston College =

Livingston College, Rutgers University
- Motto: "Strength through Diversity"
- Type: Coeducational, undergraduate residential college
- Established: 1965 (opened 1969)
- Affiliations: Rutgers University
- Location: Piscataway, New Jersey, United States

Livingston College was one of the residential colleges that comprised Rutgers, The State University of New Jersey's undergraduate liberal arts programs from 1969 to 2007. It was located on Livingston Campus (originally Kilmer) in Piscataway, New Jersey. In the fall of 2007 the New Brunswick-area liberal arts undergraduate colleges, including Livingston College, merged into one School of Arts and Sciences of Rutgers University.

== History ==
Named after William Livingston, the first post-colonial governor of New Jersey, Livingston College opened in 1969 as the first coeducational, residential, liberal arts college at the New Brunswick-Piscataway campuses of Rutgers, The State University of New Jersey. (The college's official founding date of 1965, seen in its "Strength Through Diversity" logo, reflects when Rutgers committed to opening the college, which occurred four years later.)

The university states: "Livingston embodied the spirit of social responsibility and cultural awareness demanded by students of the time." The college was created in response to socio-political changes in the United States during the 1960s, including addressing the needs of African-American, Puerto Rican and non-traditional white students whose needs were not met by Rutgers College and Douglass College. It was seen as a "safe" experimental college due to being part of a 200-year-old university. Livingston College established several academic departments at Rutgers University including Journalism, and Urban Studies and Planning.

Like the other former liberal arts colleges—Douglass College, Rutgers College, University College (Rutgers University), and the liberal arts facet of Cook College—Livingston College maintained requirements for admission, good standing, and graduation distinct from the other colleges. In 1982 Rutgers merged the faculties from these various colleges into a new Faculty of Arts and Sciences. By the turn of the century, many in the university's community questioned whether these multiple colleges and their disparate academic requirements had become redundant and inefficient. Livingston College ceased to exist with a 2007 merger which created the School of Arts and Sciences, but students who had enrolled prior to the merger still earned Livingston College degrees until the college's final graduation ceremony in May 2010.

== Academics ==
Livingston College offered its students over 60 majors to choose from, with a focus on liberal arts.

=== Honors program ===
Livingston College invited students to apply, or selected students based upon grades, into the Livingston College Honors Program. The honors program was led by the honors dean of the college. Honors students were required to take honors colloquia courses in addition to their required, general undergraduate coursework. By the end of a traditional four-year undergraduate degree, honors students were also expected to complete an undergraduate honors thesis.

In 2007, the Livingston College Honors Program, along with the other honors programs of Rutgers University's colleges, merged into the School of Arts and Sciences (SAS) Honors Program.

== Notable alumni ==
- Bill Bellamy (1989)—comedian
- Avery Brooks (1973)—actor (Spenser: For Hire, Star Trek: Deep Space Nine) and professor of Mason Gross School of the Arts.
- Michael DuHaime (1995)—Republican strategist, deputy campaign manager and political director for Senator John McCain's 2008 presidential campaign
- Mark Helias (1974)—Jazz musician
- Pedro Guanikeyu Torres (1973-1977) Is a Native American Tribal Government Representative and a Taino Native American Indian Civil Rights activist
- Harry Pickens (1960)—Jazz pianist
- Phil Sellers (1976)—NBA basketball player for the Detroit Pistons
- Kurt Sutter (1986)—American screenwriter, director, producer, and actor. Creator of Sons of Anarchy
- Harry Swayne (1990)—NFL football player

== Notable faculty ==
- Nikki Giovanni—poet
- Barbara Benary—ethnomusicologist
- Philip Corner—composer
- Daniel Goode—composer
- Geoffrey Hendricks—artist
- Wheeler Winston Dixon—filmmaker
