= John Sasso =

American political operative

Personal details
- Born: 1946 or 1947 (age 78–79) New Jersey, U.S.
- Party: Democratic
- Education: Boston University (BA)

John Sasso (born 1946/1947) is an American Democratic political operative who ran the 1988 election bid by Michael Dukakis.

== Life and career ==
Sasso was born in New Jersey. Initially a teacher, he began his political career as an organizer for Congressman Gerry Studds, and gained note as an organizer for Ted Kennedy in the 1980 Iowa primaries. Having worked on Michael Dukakis's 1982 campaign for Massachusetts Governor, Sasso served as his chief of staff from 1983 to 1987; Dukakis then appointed him as campaign manager for his presidential bid, after Sasso persuaded the governor that he could win nationally. Sasso was primarily responsible for creating the strategy and organization that allowed Dukakis to win the Democratic nomination in a crowded field.

Before the first primaries, however, Sasso was identified as the person responsible for the distribution of a videotape showing similarities between a speech by Sen. Joseph Biden, a Dukakis rival for the nomination, and British politician Neil Kinnock, leading to Sasso's forced resignation from the Dukakis campaign.

With Dukakis trailing George H. W. Bush by double digits in the polls, however, Dukakis recalled Sasso to the campaign just before Labor Day. Ultimately, resistance to Sasso's resuming management of the campaign from the still official "campaign manager", Susan Estrich, a Harvard Law School professor, hampered Sasso's efforts to turn the campaign's fortunes around. Still, the gap was closed to around 53–46 by voting day.

Following the campaign, Sasso became a consultant with an array of major national clients, while continuing to be called upon as a top strategist within the Democratic Party. He was reputed to be ready to head up New York Governor Mario Cuomo's presidential campaign had Cuomo run in 1992, but Cuomo declined to enter the race.

=== 2004 Campaign season ===
In 2004 John Kerry brought Sasso in as "the man on the plane" during his own ill-fated presidential campaign, and Sasso emerged from the campaign as one of the few campaign operatives whose reputations were burnished by his role on the campaign. Just prior to that involvement, also at Kerry's request, Sasso had taken on a major role for the Democratic National Committee.
