= Joseph A. Maressa =

American politician (1923–2012)

Joseph A. Maressa Sr.

Member of the New Jersey Senate
- In office January 11, 1972 – January 12, 1982
- Preceded by: Hugh A. Kelly Jr.
- Succeeded by: Daniel Dalton
- Constituency: District 3B (1972–1974); 4th district (1974–1982)

Personal details
- Born: October 17, 1923 Camden, New Jersey
- Died: October 30, 2012 (aged 89)
- Party: Democratic
- Spouse: Josephine Tomassone (died 1979)
- Children: One daughter; three sons
- Education: Temple University (1947); Rutgers School of Law–Camden (1952)
- Occupation: Attorney

Joseph A. Maressa Sr. (October 17, 1923 – October 30, 2012) was an American lawyer and Democratic Party politician who was elected to serve three terms in the New Jersey Senate, representing Legislative District 3B for his first two years and the 4th Legislative District for the remainder of his service in elected office. First elected to office in 1972, Maressa decided against running for office for a fourth term in 1982 after accepting a bribe to aid an Arab sheikh from an undercover FBI agent acting as part of the Abscam sting operation, though Maressa claimed that he had accepted the $10,000 as part of his patriotic efforts as an American to bring oil money back to the United States.

== Personal life ==
Born in Camden, New Jersey, on October 17, 1923, Maressa was one of eight children born to parents who had emigrated to the United States from Sicily. He graduated from Camden High School in 1942 and enlisted with the United States Navy during World War II, with which he served in the Pacific Theater of Operations on deep sea mine disposal and was commissioned as a lieutenant. He received his bachelor's degree in criminal justice from Temple University in 1947. Unsuccessful in his aspirations to become an agent with the FBI, Maressa became a trooper with the New Jersey State Police. In 1952, Maressa received his law degree from Rutgers School of Law–Camden, having attended night school. He began the practice of law in Berlin, New Jersey, with a specialization in local government law, working for municipalities and local boards of education.

During a 35-year span in which he served on the board of trustees and board and directors of the Kennedy Health System and Kennedy University Hospitals, Maressa played a pivotal role in the hospital's expansion through its acquisition of hospitals in Cherry Hill and the Turnersville section of Washington Township, earning recognition for his efforts by both the American Osteopathic Healthcare Association and the New Jersey Hospital Association.

A resident of the Atco neighborhood of Waterford Township, New Jersey, Maressa died at the age of 89 on October 30, 2012, at Virtua West Jersey Hospital in Berlin.

== Public service ==
In the 1971 general election, Maressa was elected to represent District 3B of the New Jersey Senate, one of four representatives from the 3rd Legislative District, which was further divided into four subdistricts (Districts 3A, 3B, 3C, and 3D); District 3B included portions of Camden and Gloucester counties.

Upon the creation of a 40-district legislative map in 1973 in response to the one-man-one-vote system mandated by the 1964 Supreme Court decision in Reynolds v. Sims, the new 4th Legislative District consisted of portions of Burlington County, Camden County and Gloucester County. Maressa was elected to the new district in the 1973 general election representing the 4th District, and was re-elected in 1977.

Maressa took greatest pride in the passage of legislation that established the University of Medicine and Dentistry of New Jersey's School of Osteopathic Medicine (renamed in 2013 as the Rowan University School of Osteopathic Medicine), established in 1976 and located on a campus in Stratford, New Jersey. Maressa felt that he was filling a vital need for a medical school that would serve South Jersey. In the Senate, Maressa served on the Judiciary Committee and was Majority Whip.

With Burlington County removed from the 4th District and portions of Atlantic County added in redistricting following the 1980 United States census, Maressa decided against running for re-election and was succeeded by Daniel Dalton, who defeated Kenneth A. Gewertz in the June Democratic Party primary and went on to win the November 1981 general election, defeating Republican Frank B. Smith by a 63%-37% margin.

== Abscam ==
In 1980, Maressa accepted $10,000 from a group of FBI agents who were part of the Abscam undercover operation. The money was given to Maressa to obtain his support on behalf of a fictitious Arab sheikh in exchange for Maressa's efforts to get legislative support to obtain a gambling license for a casino in Atlantic City. Maressa justified accepting what he described as legal fees, saying that "I felt like it would be patriotic to take some of this OPEC oil money and get it back to the United States". Maressa wasn't prosecuted for his actions.

New Jersey Senate
Preceded by Hugh A. Kelly	Member of the New Jersey Senate from the 3B district January 11, 1972–January 8, 1974	Succeeded by Constituency abolished
Preceded by Constituency established	Member of the New Jersey Senate from the 4th district January 8, 1974–January 12, 1982	Succeeded by Daniel Dalton
