= New Jersey's 5th legislative district =

American legislative district

- Senator: Nilsa Cruz-Perez (D)
- Assembly members: William Spearman (D); Bill Moen (D)
- Registration: 47.71% Democratic; 15.87% Republican; 34.92% unaffiliated
- Demographics: 54.1% White; 20.5% Black/African American; 0.5% Native American; 3.0% Asian; 0.0% Hawaiian/Pacific Islander; 13.2% Other race; 8.5% Two or more races; 23.0% Hispanic
- Population: 221,612
- Voting-age population: 168,945
- Registered voters: 163,507

New Jersey's 5th legislative district is one of 40 in the New Jersey Legislature. As of the 2011 apportionment, the district covers the Camden County municipalities of Audubon, Barrington, Bellmawr, Brooklawn, Camden, Collingswood, Gloucester City, Haddon Heights, Mount Ephraim, Merchantville, Pennsauken, Runnemede and Woodlynne; and the Gloucester County municipalities of Deptford Township, Woodbury Heights, and Woodbury.

== Demographic characteristics ==
As of the 2020 United States census, the district had a population of 221,612, of whom 168,945 (76.2%) were of voting age. The racial makeup of the district was 119,934 (54.1%) White, 45,434 (20.5%) African American, 1,208 (0.5%) Native American, 6,686 (3.0%) Asian, 87 (0.0%) Pacific Islander, 29,335 (13.2%) from some other race, and 18,928 (8.5%) from two or more races. Hispanic or Latino of any race were 51,605 (23.0%) of the population.

The district had 163,507 registered voters as of December 1, 2021, of whom 59,177 (36.2%) were registered as unaffiliated, 75,237 (46.0%) were registered as Democrats, 26,512 (16.2%) were registered as Republicans, and 2,581 (1.6%) were registered to other parties.

== Political representation ==
For the 2026–2027 session, the 5th legislative district of the New Jersey Legislature is represented in the State Senate by Nilsa Cruz-Perez (D, Barrington) and in the General Assembly by Bill Moen (D, Camden) and William Spearman (D, Camden).

The legislative district overlaps with New Jersey's 1st congressional district.

== 1965–1973 ==
The 1964 Supreme Court decision in Reynolds v. Sims required legislative districts' populations be equal as possible. As an interim measure, the 5th district in the 1965 State Senate election encompassed all of Ocean and Monmouth counties which elected two members of the Senate at-large. Republicans Richard R. Stout and William T. Hiering won this election for a two-year term. For the 1967 and 1971 elections, the 5th consisted of only Monmouth County and elected two and three Senators respectively. Republicans Stout and Alfred N. Beadleston won the 1967 election for a four-year term while Stout, Beadleston, and Republican Assemblyman Joseph Azzolina won in the 1971 election for a two-year term.

Between 1967 and 1973, the 5th Senate district was split into two Assembly districts, each electing two members. As Monmouth County gained population following the 1970 census, an additional Assembly member was elected at-large for the 1971 election. The members elected to the Assembly from each district are as follows:

Session	District 5A	District 5B	District 5 at-large
1968–1969	James M. Coleman (R)	Joseph Azzolina (R)	
1968–1969	Louis R. Aikins (R)	Chester Apy (R)	
1970–1971	John I. Dawes (R)	James M. Coleman (R)	
1970–1971	Joseph E. Robertson (R)	Joseph Azzolina (R)	
1972–1973	John I. Dawes (R)	Eugene J. Bedell (D)	Joseph E. Robertson (R) (Note: Resigned on August 6, 1973, to join staff of the Turnpike Authority)
1972–1973	Brian T. Kennedy (R)	Chester Apy (R)	Joseph E. Robertson (R)

== District composition since 1973 ==
Since the creation of the 40-district legislative map in 1973, the 5th district has always been based around the city of Camden and nearby suburbs. In the 1973 iteration of the map, the district began in Camden city and traveled southeast to Hi-Nella. In 1981, some Camden County boroughs and Haddon Township were removed but added to the district were Gloucester City, Bellmawr, and Runnemede in Camden County and Deptford Township and Woodbury Heights. No major changes were made to the district in the 1991 or 2001 reapportionments. The 2011 apportionment added Audubon Park (from the 6th district) and Harrison Township, Mantua Township and Wenonah (all from the 3rd district). Municipalities that had been in the 4th district as part of the 2001 apportionment that were shifted out of the district as of 2011 are Woodbury Heights (to the 3rd district), and Hi-Nella, Somerdale and Stratford (all to the 6th district).

The territory currently in the 5th has been in Democratic hands without interruption since 1973. Indeed, the 5th is one of the few districts in the state to have ever elected only one party to all Senate and Assembly seats in every election since 1973.

Assemblyman Arthur Barclay resigned his seat on June 19, 2018, citing health reasons. His resignation came less than two weeks following him being arrested for simple assault at his home. Democratic committee members in Camden and Gloucester Counties selected former Camden City Councilman William Spearman as his replacement in the Assembly on June 27; he was sworn in on June 30.

== Election history ==
Session	Senate	General Assembly	
1974–1975	John J. Horn (D) (Note: Resigned September 22, 1976, to join the Department of Labor and Industry)	James Florio (D) (Note: Resigned on January 3, 1975, following his election to Congress)	Ernest F. Schuck (D)
1974–1975	John J. Horn (D)	Ronald J. Casella (D) (Note: Elected in November 1975 special election to complete the term of James Florio, sworn in on November 14, 1975)	Ernest F. Schuck (D)
1976–1977	John J. Horn (D)	Walter Rand (D)	Ernest F. Schuck (D)
1976–1977	Angelo Errichetti (D) (Note: Elected to the Senate in November 1976 special election, sworn in on November 8, 1976)	Walter Rand (D)	Ernest F. Schuck (D)
1978–1979	Angelo Errichetti (D) (Note: Terminated from the Senate on August 14, 1981, upon his conviction in the Abscam scandal)	Walter Rand (D)	Ernest F. Schuck (D)
1980–1981	Angelo Errichetti (D)	Walter Rand (D)	Ernest F. Schuck (D)
1982–1983	Walter Rand (D)	Wayne R. Bryant (D)	Francis J. Gorman (D)
1984–1985	Walter Rand (D)	Wayne R. Bryant (D)	Francis J. Gorman (D)
1986–1987	Walter Rand (D)	Wayne R. Bryant (D)	Francis J. Gorman (D) (Note: Resigned on March 16, 1987)
1986–1987	Walter Rand (D)	Wayne R. Bryant (D)	Joseph J. Roberts (D) (Note: Elected in July 28, 1987 special election, sworn into the Assembly on September 10, 1987)
1988–1989	Walter Rand (D)	Wayne R. Bryant (D)	Joseph J. Roberts (D)
1990–1991	Walter Rand (D)	Wayne R. Bryant (D)	Joseph J. Roberts (D)
1992–1993	Walter Rand (D)	Wayne R. Bryant (D)	Joseph J. Roberts (D)
1994–1995	Walter Rand (D) (Note: Died on January 6, 1995)	Wayne R. Bryant (D) (Note: Appointed to the Senate on February 9, 1995, elected to fill the remainder of the term in a November 1995 special election)	Joseph J. Roberts (D)
1994–1995	Wayne R. Bryant (D)	Nilsa Cruz-Perez (D) (Note: Appointed to the Assembly on February 27, 1995)	Joseph J. Roberts (D)
1996–1997	Wayne R. Bryant (D)	Nilsa Cruz-Perez (D)	Joseph J. Roberts (D)
1998–1999	Wayne R. Bryant (D)	Nilsa Cruz-Perez (D)	Joseph J. Roberts (D)
2000–2001	Wayne R. Bryant (D)	Nilsa Cruz-Perez (D)	Joseph J. Roberts (D)
2002–2003	Wayne R. Bryant (D)	Nilsa Cruz-Perez (D)	Joseph J. Roberts (D)
2004–2005	Wayne R. Bryant (D)	Nilsa Cruz-Perez (D)	Joseph J. Roberts (D)
2006–2007	Wayne R. Bryant (D)	Nilsa Cruz-Perez (D)	Joseph J. Roberts (D)
2008–2009	Dana Redd (D) (Note: Resigned on January 5, 2010, to become Mayor of Camden)	Nilsa Cruz-Perez (D)	Joseph J. Roberts (D)
2010–2011	Seat vacant	Angel Fuentes (D)	Donald Norcross (D) (Note: Resigned from the Assembly on January 19, 2010 to be sworn into the Senate, elected to remainder of term in November 2010 special election)
2010–2011	Donald Norcross (D)	Angel Fuentes (D)	Gilbert "Whip" Wilson (D) (Note: Appointed to the Assembly on January 25, 2010, elected to remainder of term in November 2010 special election)
2012–2013	Donald Norcross (D)	Angel Fuentes (D)	Gilbert "Whip" Wilson (D)
2014–2015	Donald Norcross (D) (Note: Resigned on November 12, 2014 upon his election to Congress)	Angel Fuentes (D) (Note: Resigned June 30, 2015 to become a deputy county clerk)	Gilbert "Whip" Wilson (D) (Note: Resigned December 2, 2015 to become Camden County Sheriff)
2014–2015	Nilsa Cruz-Perez (D) (Note: Appointed to the Senate and sworn in on December 15, 2014, elected to remainder of unexpired term in November 2015 special election)	Angel Fuentes (D)	Gilbert "Whip" Wilson (D)
2014–2015	Nilsa Cruz-Perez (D)	Patricia Egan Jones (D) (Note: Appointed to the Assembly and sworn in on November 16, 2015)	Gilbert "Whip" Wilson (D)
2014–2015	Nilsa Cruz-Perez (D)	Patricia Egan Jones (D)	Seat vacant
2016–2017	Nilsa Cruz-Perez (D)	Patricia Egan Jones (D)	Arthur Barclay (D)
2018–2019	Nilsa Cruz-Perez (D)	Patricia Egan Jones (D)	Arthur Barclay (D) (Note: Resigned on June 19, 2018)
2018–2019	Nilsa Cruz-Perez (D)	Patricia Egan Jones (D)	William Spearman (D) (Note: Appointed to the Assembly on June 30, 2018, elected to remainder of unexpired term in November 6, 2018 special election)
2020–2021	Nilsa Cruz-Perez (D)	Bill Moen (D)	William Spearman (D)
2022–2023	Nilsa Cruz-Perez (D)	Bill Moen (D)	William Spearman (D)
2024–2025	Nilsa Cruz-Perez (D)	Bill Moen (D)	William Spearman (D)
2026–2027	Nilsa Cruz-Perez (D)	Bill Moen (D)	William Spearman (D)

== Election results, 1973–present ==
=== Senate ===
2021 New Jersey general election
Party	Candidate	Votes	%	±%
Democratic	Nilsa Cruz-Perez	31,246	57.7	▼8.4
Republican	Clyde Cook	22,903	42.3	▲9.4
Total votes		54,149	100.0	

New Jersey general election, 2017
Party	Candidate	Votes	%	±%
Democratic	Nilsa Cruz-Perez	29,031	66.1	▼33.9
Republican	Keith Walker	14,463	32.9	N/A
Challenge Promise Fix	Mohammad Kabir	454	1.0	N/A
Total votes		43,948	100.0	

Special election, November 4, 2015
Party	Candidate	Votes	%	±%
Democratic	Nilsa Cruz-Perez	19,150	100.0	▲42.1
Total votes		19,150	100.0	

New Jersey general election, 2013
Party	Candidate	Votes	%	±%
Democratic	Donald W. Norcross	25,383	57.9	▲1.1
Republican	Keith Walker	18,448	42.1	▼1.1
Total votes		43,831	100.0	

2011 New Jersey general election
Party	Candidate	Votes	%
Democratic	Donald W. Norcross	17,712	56.8
Republican	Keith Walker	13,444	43.2
Total votes		31,156	100.0

Special election, November 2, 2010
Party	Candidate	Votes	%	±%
Democratic	Donald W. Norcross	28,801	63.3	▲0.4
Republican	Harry E. Trout	15,041	33.1	▼4.0
Tea Party	Christopher J. Weag	1,646	3.6	N/A
Total votes		45,488	100.0	

2007 New Jersey general election
Party	Candidate	Votes	%	±%
Democratic	Dana Redd	16,918	62.9	▼2.0
Republican	Hans Berg	9,983	37.1	▲2.0
Total votes		26,901	100.0	

2003 New Jersey general election
Party	Candidate	Votes	%	±%
Democratic	Wayne R. Bryant	21,442	64.9	▼4.4
Republican	Ali Sloan El	11,589	35.1	▲4.4
Total votes		33,031	100.0	

2001 New Jersey general election
Party	Candidate	Votes	%
Democratic	Wayne R. Bryant	29,568	69.3
Republican	Maryann T. Callahan	13,087	30.7
Total votes		42,655	100.0

1997 New Jersey general election
Party	Candidate	Votes	%	±%
Democratic	Wayne R. Bryant	29,809	71.9	▲3.1
Republican	Mel Suplee	11,624	28.1	▼3.1
Total votes		41,433	100.0	

Special election, November 7, 1995
Party	Candidate	Votes	%	±%
Democratic	Wayne R. Bryant	21,021	68.8	▼0.4
Republican	Mel Suplee	9,514	31.2	▲0.4
Total votes		30,535	100.0	

1993 New Jersey general election
Party	Candidate	Votes	%	±%
Democratic	Walter Rand	29,152	69.2	▲2.1
Republican	Anthony J. De Gerolamo	12,959	30.8	▼2.1
Total votes		42,111	100.0	

1991 New Jersey general election
Party	Candidate	Votes	%
Democratic	Walter Rand	25,834	67.1
Republican	Rev. Edwin A. Martinez	12,666	32.9
Total votes		38,500	100.0

1987 New Jersey general election
Party	Candidate	Votes	%	±%
Democratic	Walter Rand	24,784	68.3	▲2.3
Republican	Mary Jo Tate	11,477	31.7	▼2.3
Total votes		36,261	100.0	

1983 New Jersey general election
Party	Candidate	Votes	%	±%
Democratic	Walter Rand	23,446	66.0	▼6.0
Republican	Gregory B. Montgomery	12,090	34.0	▲6.0
Total votes		35,536	100.0	

1981 New Jersey general election
Party	Candidate	Votes	%
Democratic	Walter Rand	32,866	72.0
Republican	John H. Lyons, Jr.	12,800	28.0
Total votes		45,666	100.0

1977 New Jersey general election
Party	Candidate	Votes	%	±%
Democratic	Angelo J. Errichetti	27,352	69.4	▲9.1
Republican	Ernest J. Merlino	12,078	30.6	▼6.2
Total votes		39,430	100.0	

Special election, November 2, 1976
Party	Candidate	Votes	%	±%
Democratic	Angelo J. Errichetti	32,785	60.3	▼4.9
Republican	Helen Wise	20,004	36.8	▲2.9
Independent	Elijah Perry	1,586	2.9	N/A
Total votes		54,375	100.0	

1973 New Jersey general election
Party	Candidate	Votes	%
Democratic	John J. Horn	25,999	65.2
Republican	Richard C. Hardenbergh	13,509	33.9
Socialist Labor	Dominic W. Doganiero	369	0.9
Total votes		39,877	100.0

=== General Assembly ===
2021 New Jersey general election
Party	Candidate	Votes	%	±%
Democratic	William F. Moen Jr.	30,442	28.7	▼4.1
Democratic	William W. Spearman	30,059	28.4	▼5.6
Republican	Samuel DiMatteo	23,007	21.7	▲4.9
Republican	Sean Sepsey	22,413	21.2	▲4.8
Total votes		105,921	100.0	

2019 New Jersey general election
Party	Candidate	Votes	%	±%
Democratic	William W. Spearman	22,282	34.0	▼0.6
Democratic	William F. Moen Jr.	21,460	32.8	▲0.3
Republican	Nicholas Kush	10,987	16.8	0.0
Republican	Kevin Ehret	10,713	16.4	▲0.3
Total votes		65,442	100.0	

Special election, November 6, 2018
Party	Candidate	Votes	%
Democratic	William W. Spearman	45,125	66.3
Republican	Nicholas Kush	22,986	33.7
Total votes		68,111	100.0

New Jersey general election, 2017
Party	Candidate	Votes	%	±%
Democratic	Patricia Egan Jones	29,282	34.6	▲0.6
Democratic	Arthur Barclay	27,544	32.5	▲0.5
Republican	Teresa L. Gordon	14,181	16.8	▼0.9
Republican	Kevin Ehret	13,625	16.1	▼0.2
Total votes		84,632	100.0	

New Jersey general election, 2015
Party	Candidate	Votes	%	±%
Democratic	Patricia Egan Jones	16,766	34.0	▲4.3
Democratic	Arthur Barclay	15,797	32.0	▲2.8
Republican	Keith A. Walker	8,717	17.7	▼3.3
Republican	Kevin P. Ehret	8,045	16.3	▼3.8
Total votes		49,325	100.0	

New Jersey general election, 2013
Party	Candidate	Votes	%	±%
Democratic	Angel Fuentes	25,167	29.7	▲1.2
Democratic	Gilbert L. "Whip" Wilson	24,761	29.2	▲0.5
Republican	David Ragonese	17,774	21.0	▼1.0
Republican	George Wagoner	17,037	20.1	▼0.6
Total votes		84,739	100.0	

New Jersey general election, 2011
Party	Candidate	Votes	%
Democratic	Gilbert L. "Whip" Wilson	17,691	28.7
Democratic	Angel Fuentes	17,586	28.5
Republican	William Levins	13,575	22.0
Republican	Terrell A. Ratliff	12,776	20.7
Total votes		61,628	100.0

Special election, November 2, 2010
Party	Candidate	Votes	%
Democratic	Gilbert "Whip" Wilson	29,280	64.7
Republican	Barbara A. Gallagher	15,972	35.3
Total votes		45,252	100.0

New Jersey general election, 2009
Party	Candidate	Votes	%	±%
Democratic	Donald W. Norcross	25,384	30.9	▼1.3
Democratic	Angel Fuentes	25,188	30.7	▲1.4
Republican	Brian Kluchnick	15,812	19.3	▲2.5
Republican	Stepfanie Velez-Gentry	15,748	19.2	▲2.6
Total votes		82,132	100.0	

New Jersey general election, 2007
Party	Candidate	Votes	%	±%
Democratic	Joe Roberts	17,554	32.2	▼13.2
Democratic	Nilsa Cruz-Perez	15,978	29.3	▼13.2
Republican	Edward Torres	9,136	16.8	N/A
Republican	Jonathan Mangel	9,070	16.6	N/A
Green	Richard L. Giovanoni	1,419	2.6	▼2.5
Green	Mark Heacock	1,381	2.5	▼2.7
Total votes		54,538	100.0	

New Jersey general election, 2005
Party	Candidate	Votes	%	±%
Democratic	Joe Roberts	29,893	45.4	▲12.9
Democratic	Nilsa I. Cruz-Perez	27,955	42.5	▲12.0
Green	Richard L. Giovanoni	3,429	5.2	N/A
Green	Mark Heacock	3,386	5.1	N/A
Libertarian	Kevin Ferrizzi	1,131	1.7	N/A
Total votes		65,794	100.0	

New Jersey general election, 2003
Party	Candidate	Votes	%	±%
Democratic	Joe Roberts	21,608	32.5	▼10.5
Democratic	Nilsa I. Cruz-Perez	20,260	30.5	▼9.6
Republican	Jeffrey R. Kugler	12,467	18.7	▲1.8
Republican	Eddie Torres	12,165	18.3	N/A
Total votes		66,500	100.0	

New Jersey general election, 2001
Party	Candidate	Votes	%
Democratic	Joe Roberts	32,224	43.0
Democratic	Nilsa Cruz-Perez	30,087	40.1
Republican	Ella Hilton	12,659	16.9
Total votes		74,970	100.0

New Jersey general election, 1999
Party	Candidate	Votes	%	±%
Democratic	Joe Roberts	18,429	43.6	▲0.1
Democratic	Nilsa Cruz-Perez	16,398	38.8	▼0.6
Republican	William E. Spencer	7,438	17.6	▲1.6
Total votes		42,265	100.0	

New Jersey general election, 1997
Party	Candidate	Votes	%	±%
Democratic	Joe Roberts	31,898	43.5	▲9.3
Democratic	Nilsa Cruz-Perez	28,918	39.4	▲7.9
Republican	Joe Smiriglio	11,744	16.0	▼1.6
Republican	No nomination made	777	1.1	▼15.5
Total votes		73,337	100.0	

New Jersey general election, 1995
Party	Candidate	Votes	%	±%
Democratic	Joe Roberts	20,618	34.2	▼0.5
Democratic	Nilsa Cruz-Perez	19,006	31.5	▼3.4
Republican	David Brodecki	10,635	17.6	▲2.1
Republican	Jose Delgado	10,000	16.6	▲1.8
Total votes		60,259	100.0	

New Jersey general election, 1993
Party	Candidate	Votes	%	±%
Democratic	Wayne R. Bryant	28,905	34.9	▲2.6
Democratic	Joseph J. Roberts, Jr.	28,739	34.7	▲2.8
Republican	Hans Berg	12,851	15.5	▼3.0
Republican	Merle Ways	12,254	14.8	▼2.5
Total votes		82,749	100.0	

1991 New Jersey general election
Party	Candidate	Votes	%
Democratic	Wayne R. Bryant	24,592	32.3
Democratic	Joe Roberts	24,322	31.9
Republican	Walter Jost	14,124	18.5
Republican	Rev. John Randall	13,197	17.3
Total votes		76,235	100.0

1989 New Jersey general election
Party	Candidate	Votes	%	±%
Democratic	Wayne R. Bryant	32,479	37.1	▲2.2
Democratic	Joe Roberts	31,906	36.5	▲2.3
Republican	Jay L. Scott	11,779	13.5	▼1.5
Republican	Raymond R. Groller	11,281	12.9	▼3.0
Total votes		87,445	100.0	

1987 New Jersey general election
Party	Candidate	Votes	%	±%
Democratic	Wayne R. Bryant	25,214	34.9	▲4.2
Democratic	Joseph J. Roberts, Jr.	24,668	34.2	▲3.3
Republican	Raymond R. Groller	11,483	15.9	▼3.7
Republican	Jose DeJesus, Jr.	10,835	15.0	▼3.8
Total votes		72,200	100.0	

Special election, July 28, 1987
Party	Candidate	Votes	%
Democratic	Joseph J. Roberts, Jr.	4,809	80.5
Republican	Jose DeJesus, Jr.	1,167	19.5
Total votes		5,976	100.0

1985 New Jersey general election
Party	Candidate	Votes	%	±%
Democratic	Francis J. Gorman	22,828	30.9	▼2.8
Democratic	Wayne R. Bryant	22,691	30.7	▼3.6
Republican	Charles E. Brimm	14,514	19.6	▲3.3
Republican	William M. Terrell	13,872	18.8	▲3.2
Total votes		73,905	100.0	

New Jersey general election, 1983
Party	Candidate	Votes	%	±%
Democratic	Wayne R. Bryant	23,691	34.3	▼1.3
Democratic	Francis J. Gorman	23,295	33.7	▼2.3
Republican	Marion Conover	11,268	16.3	▲2.4
Republican	John N. Donis	10,773	15.6	▲2.4
Total votes		69,027	100.0	

New Jersey general election, 1981
Party	Candidate	Votes	%
Democratic	Francis J. Gorman	32,788	36.0
Democratic	Wayne R. Bryant	32,442	35.6
Republican	Joseph N. Azzari	12,708	13.9
Republican	Milton E. Minus, Sr.	12,007	13.2
For Needed Change	Raymond V. S. Miller	1,191	1.3
Total votes		91,136	100.0

New Jersey general election, 1979
Party	Candidate	Votes	%	±%
Democratic	Ernest F. Schuck	18,640	39.7	▲6.8
Democratic	Walter Rand	18,412	39.2	▲6.9
Republican	Robert J. Venuti	8,704	18.5	▲1.4
Socialist Labor	Jack B. Bowell	674	1.4	N/A
Socialist Labor	Julius Levin	513	1.1	N/A
Total votes		46,943	100.0	

New Jersey general election, 1977
Party	Candidate	Votes	%	±%
Democratic	Ernest F. Schuck	24,749	32.9	▲0.5
Democratic	Walter Rand	24,320	32.3	▲1.4
Republican	John W. Troutman, Sr.	12,879	17.1	▼0.7
Republican	George F. Geist, Jr.	12,844	17.1	▼0.5
Independent Liberal	Elbridge C. Holloway, II	483	0.6	N/A
Total votes		75,275	100.0	

New Jersey general election, 1975
Party	Candidate	Votes	%	±%
Democratic	Ernest F. Schuck	22,166	32.4	▼0.4
Democratic	Walter Rand	21,157	30.9	▼4.3
Republican	Harold A. Miller	12,168	17.8	▲2.0
Republican	Jack W. Yeager	12,071	17.6	▲2.6
Socialist Labor	Julius Levin	481	0.7	N/A
Independent	Samuel Cinger	412	0.6	N/A
Total votes		68,455	100.0	

Special election, November 4, 1975
Party	Candidate	Votes	%
Democratic	Ronald J. Casella	21,551	63.4
Republican	Harold A. Miller	12,461	36.6
Total votes		34,012	100.0

New Jersey general election, 1973
Party	Candidate	Votes	%
Democratic	James J. Florio	27,449	35.2
Democratic	Ernest F. Schuck	25,585	32.8
Republican	C. Philip Murray, Jr.	12,281	15.8
Republican	Philip Wolf	11,713	15.0
Taxation With Representation	Raymond V. S. Miller	407	0.5
Dedicated, Honest, Unbossed	Frank J. Paradise	329	0.4
Dedicated, Honest, Unbossed	Donald R. MacLuckie	158	0.2
Total votes		77,922	100.0

== Election results, 1965–1973 ==
=== Senate ===
1965 New Jersey general election
Party	Candidate	Votes	%
Republican	Richard R. Stout	99,688	28.4
Republican	William T. Hiering	95,282	27.2
Democratic	John J. Reilly	80,832	23.1
Democratic	Thomas J. Muccifori	74,857	21.2
Total votes		350,659	100.0

1967 New Jersey general election
Party	Candidate	Votes	%
Republican	Richard R. Stout	69,714	32.1
Republican	Alfred N. Beadleston	68,005	31.3
Democratic	Richard L. Bonello	40,426	18.6
Democratic	Paul J. Smith	39,370	18.1
Total votes		217,515	100.0

1971 New Jersey general election
Party	Candidate	Votes	%
Republican	Richard R. Stout	69,067	19.4
Republican	Alfred N. Beadleston	68,555	19.3
Republican	Joseph Azzolina	60,199	16.9
Democratic	Vincent Miller	53,902	15.2
Democratic	William Himelman	53,861	15.1
Democratic	Walter Gehricke	50,201	14.1
Total votes		355,785	100.0

=== General Assembly ===
==== District 5A ====
New Jersey general election, 1967
Party	Candidate	Votes	%
Republican	James M. Coleman, Jr.	34,729	32.3
Republican	Louis R. Aikins	33,569	31.2
Democratic	Albert J. Villapiano	19,821	18.4
Democratic	John W. Beekman	19,444	18.1
Total votes		107,563	100.0

New Jersey general election, 1969
Party	Candidate	Votes	%
Republican	John I. Dawes	41,016	29.6
Republican	Joseph E. Robertson	39,695	28.6
Democratic	Richard T. O’Connor	29,807	21.5
Democratic	Benedict R. Nicosia	27,513	19.8
Independent Party	Robert B. Hampton	348	0.3
Independent Party	John James Crist	306	0.2
Total votes		138,685	100.0

New Jersey general election, 1971
Party	Candidate	Votes	%
Republican	John I. Dawes	34,379	29.0
Republican	Brian T. Kennedy	33,368	28.2
Democratic	Eli S. Belil	25,921	21.9
Democratic	Robert V. Noreika	24,780	20.9
Total votes		118,448	100.0

==== District 5B ====
New Jersey general election, 1967
Party	Candidate	Votes	%
Republican	Joseph Azzolina	31,187	28.7
Republican	Chester Apy	30,790	28.3
Democratic	Patrick J. McGann, Jr.	25,444	23.4
Democratic	Walter H. Gehricke	21,187	19.5
Total votes		108,608	100.0

New Jersey general election, 1969
Party	Candidate	Votes	%
Republican	James M. Coleman, Jr.	38,924	30.0
Republican	Joseph Azzolina	35,753	27.5
Democratic	Richard L. Bonello	27,899	21.5
Democratic	Gordon N. Litwin	26,879	20.7
Independent Party	Armond Tomaini	435	0.3
Total votes		129,890	100.0

New Jersey general election, 1971
Party	Candidate	Votes	%
Democratic	Eugene J. Bedell	29,492	25.6
Republican	Chester Apy	28,442	24.7
Democratic	Edward P. Carey, Jr.	27,890	24.2
Republican	Daniel S. Kruman	27,495	23.9
Independent	Samuel C. Capalbo	1,724	1.5
Total votes		115,043	100.0

==== District 5 At-large ====
New Jersey general election, 1971
Party	Candidate	Votes	%
Republican	Joseph E. Robertson	57,494	49.1
Democratic	John C. Manna	55,230	47.2
National Conservative	Warren Disbrow	4,271	3.7
Total votes		116,995	100.0
