= Hurffville, New Jersey =

Populated place in Gloucester County, New Jersey, US

- Unincorporated community
- Hurffville's location in Gloucester County (Inset: Gloucester County in New Jersey) Hurffville (New Jersey) Hurffville (the United States)
- Coordinates: 39°45′45″N 75°06′30″W
- Country: United States
- State: New Jersey
- County: Gloucester
- Township: Washington
- Named after: Hurff family
- Elevation: 79 ft (24 m)
- ZIP Code: 08080
- GNIS feature ID: 0877292

Hurffville is an unincorporated community within Washington Township, in Gloucester County, in the U.S. state of New Jersey. Hurffville got its name from the Hurff family, one of the early settlers to the township.

Hurffville School is an elementary school in Hurffville and is one of the oldest schools in the Washington Township Public School District.
