= Francis J. Gorman =

American politician (1924–1987)

Member of the New Jersey General Assembly
- In office January 11, 1972 – March 16, 1987 Serving with Kenneth A. Gewertz (1972–80) and Wayne R. Bryant (1980–87)
- Preceded by: Thomas J. Shusted; James M. Turner
- Succeeded by: Joseph J. Roberts
- Constituency: District 3B (1972–74); 4th district (1974–80); 5th district (1980–87)

Personal details
- Born: November 19, 1924 Gloucester City, New Jersey
- Died: July 8, 1987 (aged 62)
- Party: Democratic
- Education: La Salle University

Francis J. Gorman (November 19, 1924 — July 8, 1987) was an American Democratic Party politician who served seven terms in the New Jersey General Assembly.

Born on November 19, 1924, in Gloucester City, New Jersey, Gorman graduated from Gloucester Catholic High School in 1942. Gorman served in the United States Navy during World War II and the Korean War. Gorman graduated from La Salle College in 1949. From 1953 to 1957, Gorman served on the Gloucester City Council. Then he served as the Gloucester City treasurer and as the custodian of funds for the Gloucester City Public Schools.

Gorman served with Kenneth A. Gewertz from 1972 to 1974 representing District 3B in the New Jersey General Assembly. When the New Jersey Legislature was reorganized into its current structure of 40 districts, Gorman and Gewertz were elected to three terms representing the 4th Legislative District from 1974 to 1980. In 1979, James Florio, then a Congressman, encouraged Daniel Dalton and Dennis L. Riley to run in the June primary under the label of the "Florio Democratic Team" against incumbents Gewertz and Gorman, who had the support of Angelo Errichetti and the Camden County Democratic Organization. Dalton (with 31.3% of the vote) and Riley (with 28.3%) won the two ballot spots in the primary balloting. Dalton and Riley were elected in the November 1979 general election.

He was elected together with Wayne R. Bryant and represented the 5th Legislative District from 1982 until March 16, 1987, when Gorman resigned from the New Jersey General Assembly because of poor health. In a July 1987 special election, Joseph J. Roberts was chosen to fill Gorman's vacant seat.

He died at a hospital in Gloucester City, New Jersey.
