= Walter Rand =

American politician

Member of the New Jersey Senate from the 5th district
- In office January 12, 1982 – January 6, 1995
- Preceded by: Angelo Errichetti
- Succeeded by: Wayne R. Bryant

Member of the New Jersey General Assembly from the 5th district
- In office January 13, 1976 – January 12, 1982
- Preceded by: Ronald J. Casella
- Succeeded by: Wayne R. Bryant; Francis J. Gorman

Personal details
- Born: May 31, 1919 Philadelphia, Pennsylvania
- Died: January 6, 1995 (aged 75) Camden, New Jersey
- Party: Democratic

Walter Rand (May 31, 1919 – January 6, 1995), born Walter Rappaport, was an American Democratic Party politician from New Jersey, who was a specialist on transportation issues while serving in both houses of the New Jersey Legislature. Rand was a resident of Bellmawr.

== Biography ==
Rand was born in Philadelphia, Pennsylvania and attended the University of Pennsylvania. He moved to Camden, where he was an elected member of the board of education of the Camden City Public Schools from 1971 to 1974. He was elected to the New Jersey General Assembly in 1975 and to the New Jersey Senate in 1981, where he was a former chairman of the Senate Transportation and Public Utilities Committee.

Rand sponsored laws that created New Jersey's Transportation Trust Fund, which combined aid received from the Federal government, state appropriations and highway bond proceeds to pay for an accelerated road building and repair program. He wrote the bill that led to creation of the South Jersey Transportation Authority and allowed Atlantic City International Airport to expand. After Rand's death in 1995, Wayne R. Bryant was named to fill his seat in the State Senate. The Walter Rand Transportation Center in Camden is named in his honor, as is the Senator Walter Rand Institute for Public Affairs established at the Rutgers–Camden campus in 1999.
