= James M. Coleman =

American politician, New Jersey (1924–2014)

James Melville Coleman, Jr. (February 17, 1924 – April 12, 2014) was an American lawyer and Republican Party legislator who served in the New Jersey General Assembly and as a judge in New Jersey Superior Court.

Born in Long Branch, he lived in Asbury Park, New Jersey and graduated from Asbury Park High School in 1942. He served in the United States Army Air Forces during World War II. He then received his bachelor's degree from Dartmouth College in 1948 and his law degree from Cornell Law School in 1951. Coleman then practiced law in Asbury Park. From 1957 to 1965, Coleman served on the Asbury Park City Council. Coleman then served in the New Jersey General Assembly, as a Republican, from 1966 to 1972. Coleman was Monmouth County, New Jersey prosecutor from 1972 to 1977. In 1980, Coleman was appointed New Jersey Superior Court judge serving until 1987. He died in Rockville Centre, New York.
