= 2015 New Jersey General Assembly election =

- November 3, 2015

All 80 seats in the New Jersey General Assembly 41 seats needed for a majority
- Turnout: 22% (▼18pp)
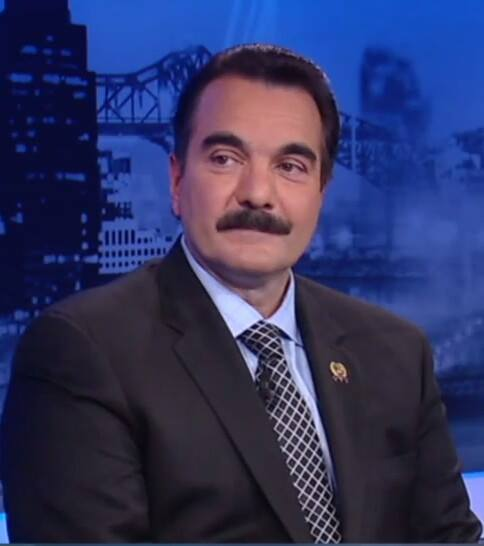

	Majority party	Minority party
Leader	Vincent Prieto	Jon Bramnick
Party	Democratic	Republican
Leader since	January 14, 2014	January 17, 2012
Leader's seat	32nd (Secaucus)	21st (Westfield)
Last election	48	32
Seats won	52	28
Seat change	▲4	▼4
Popular vote	1,111,320	958,085
Percentage	53.3%	45.9%
Swing	▲4.6%	▼4.8%
- Results: Democratic hold Democratic gain Republican hold
Speaker before election
Vincent Prieto
Democratic
Elected Speaker
Vincent Prieto
Democratic

All 80 seats in the General Assembly were up for election this year. In each Legislative district, there are two people elected; the top two winners in the general election are the ones sent to the Assembly. Typically, the two members of each party run as a team in each election. After the previous election, Democrats captured 48 seats while the Republicans won 32 seats. At the time of the general election, there were two vacancies: One in the 5th District resulting from Democrat Angel Fuentes's resignation on June 30, 2015, and one in the 24th District resulting from Republican Alison Littell McHose's resignation on October 17, 2015.

Ultimately, four Democrats defeated four incumbent Republicans leading to the Democrats controlling 52 of 80 seats in the 2016–17 Assembly session, the highest percentage they held since 1979. Democrats flipped both seats in the 11th district, and one each in the 16th and the 1st.

The 22% turnout was the lowest recorded in recent state history.

== Incumbents not seeking re-election ==
=== Democratic ===
- Gilbert Wilson, District 5 (ran for Camden County Sheriff)
- Linda Stender, District 22
- Jason O'Donnell, District 31
- Carmelo Garcia, District 33 (lost party support for renomination)

=== Republican ===
- Alison Littell McHose, District 24

== Overall results ==
Summary of the November 3, 2015 New Jersey General Assembly election results:

↓
52	28
Democratic	Republican

Parties	Candidates	Seats				Popular Vote		
Parties	Candidates	2013	2015	+/-	Strength	Vote	%	Change
Democratic	78	48	52	▲4	65%	1,111,320	53.3%	0.0%
Republican	79	32	28	▼4	35%	958,085	45.9%	0.0%
Green	8	0	0	Steady	0%	8,643	0.4%	0.0%
Libertarian	2	0	0	Steady	0%	1,180	0.1%	0.0%
Independent	8	0	0	Steady	0%	6,891	0.3%	0.0%
Total	175	80	80	0	100.0%	2,086,119	100.0%	-

== Summary of results by district ==
Legislative District	2012 Pres.	Incumbent	Party	Elected Assembly Member	Party
1st	D+6.16	Sam Fiocchi	Republican	R. Bruce Land	Democrat
1st	D+6.16	Bob Andrzejczak	Democrat	Bob Andrzejczak	Democratic
2nd	D+20.84	Vince Mazzeo	Democrat	Vince Mazzeo	Democrat
2nd	D+20.84	Chris A. Brown	Republican	John Armato	Democrat
3rd	D+11.24	John J. Burzichelli	Democrat	John J. Burzichelli	Democrat
3rd	D+11.24	Adam Taliaferro	Democrat	Adam Taliaferro	Democrat
4th	D+23.24	Paul D. Moriarty	Democrat	Paul D. Moriarty	Democrat
4th	D+23.24	Gabriela Mosquera	Democrat	Gabriela Mosquera	Democrat
5th	D+39.94	Angel Fuentes	Democrat	Arthur Barclay	Democrat
5th	D+39.94	Marianne Holly Cass	Democrat	Patricia Egan Jones	Democrat
6th	D+29.54	Louis Greenwald	Democrat	Louis Greenwald	Democrat
6th	D+29.54	Pamela Rosen Lampitt	Democrat	Pamela Rosen Lampitt	Democrat
7th	D+28.38	Herb Conaway	Democrat	Herb Conaway	Democrat
7th	D+28.38	Troy Singleton	Democrat	Troy Singleton	Democrat
8th	D+7.31	Maria Rodriguez-Gregg	Republican	Ryan Peters	Republican
8th	D+7.31	Christopher J. Brown	Republican	Jean Stanfield	Republican
9th	R+11.05	Brian E. Rumpf	Republican	Brian E. Rumpf	Republican
9th	R+11.05	DiAnne Gove	Republican	DiAnne Gove	Republican
10th	R+14.06	Gregory P. McGuckin	Republican	Gregory P. McGuckin	Republican
10th	R+14.06	David W. Wolfe	Republican	David W. Wolfe	Republican
11th	D+11.04	Mary Pat Angelini	Republican	Eric Houghtaling	Democrat
11th	D+11.04	Caroline Casagrande	Republican	Joann Downey	Democrat
12th	R+6.14	Ronald S. Dancer	Republican	Ronald S. Dancer	Republican
12th	R+6.14	Robert D. Clifton	Republican	Robert D. Clifton	Republican
13th	R+10.33	Declan O'Scanlon	Republican	Declan O'Scanlon	Republican
13th	R+10.33	Amy Handlin	Republican	Amy Handlin	Republican
14th	D+16.12	Wayne DeAngelo	Democrat	Wayne DeAngelo	Democrat
14th	D+16.12	Daniel R. Benson	Democrat	Daniel R. Benson	Democrat
15th	D+46.7	Elizabeth Maher Muoio	Democrat	Elizabeth Maher Muoio	Democrat
15th	D+46.7	Reed Gusciora	Democrat	Reed Gusciora	Democrat
16th	D+7.65	Donna Simon	Republican	Andrew Zwicker	Democrat
16th	D+7.65	Jack Ciattarelli	Republican	Jack Ciattarelli	Republican
17th	D+45.69	Joseph Danielsen	Democrat	Joseph Danielsen	Democrat
17th	D+45.69	Joseph V. Egan	Democrat	Joseph V. Egan	Democrat
18th	D+22.64	Nancy Pinkin	Democrat	Nancy Pinkin	Democrat
18th	D+22.64	Patrick J. Diegnan	Democrat	Patrick J. Diegnan	Democrat
19th	D+34.78	Craig Coughlin	Democrat	Craig Coughlin	Democrat
19th	D+34.78	John Wisniewski	Democrat	Yvonne Lopez	Democrat
20th	D+60.96	Annette Quijano	Democrat	Annette Quijano	Democrat
20th	D+60.96	Jamel Holley	Democrat	Jamel Holley	Democrat
21st	R+5.80	Jon Bramnick	Republican	Jon Bramnick	Republican
21st	R+5.80	Nancy Munoz	Republican	Nancy Munoz	Republican
22nd	D+36.46	Linda Stender	Democrat	James J. Kennedy	Democrat
22nd	D+36.46	Jerry Green	Democrat	Jerry Green	Democrat
23rd	R+11.68	Erik Peterson	Republican	Erik Peterson	Republican
23rd	R+11.68	John DiMaio	Republican	John DiMaio	Republican
24th	R+20.64	Parker Space	Republican	Parker Space	Republican
24th	R+20.64	Alison Littell McHose	Republican	Gail Phoebus	Republican
25th	R+8.32	Tony Bucco	Republican	Tony Bucco	Republican
25th	R+8.32	Michael Patrick Carroll	Republican	Michael Patrick Carroll	Republican
26th	R+10.79	BettyLou DeCroce	Republican	BettyLou DeCroce	Republican
26th	R+10.79	Jay Webber	Republican	Jay Webber	Republican
27th	D+14.73	John F. McKeon	Democrat	John F. McKeon	Democrat
27th	D+14.73	Mila Jasey	Democrat	Mila Jasey	Democrat
28th	D+66.45	Cleopatra Tucker	Democrat	Cleopatra Tucker	Democrat
28th	D+66.45	Ralph R. Caputo	Democrat	Ralph R. Caputo	Democrat
29th	D+76.23	Eliana Pintor Marin	Democrat	Eliana Pintor Marin	Democrat
29th	D+76.23	L. Grace Spencer	Democrat	L. Grace Spencer	Democrat
30th	R+26.01	Sean T. Kean	Republican	Sean T. Kean	Republican
30th	R+26.01	Dave Rible	Republican	Dave Rible	Republican
31st	D+62.87	Charles Mainor	Democrat	Angela V. McKnight	Democrat
31st	D+62.87	Jason O'Donnell	Democrat	Nicholas Chiaravalloti	Democrat
32nd	D+48.62	Angelica M. Jimenez	Democrat	Angelica M. Jimenez	Democrat
32nd	D+48.62	Vincent Prieto	Democrat	Vincent Prieto	Democrat
33rd	D+54.92	Raj Mukherji	Democrat	Raj Mukherji	Democrat
33rd	D+54.92	Carmelo Garcia	Democrat	Annette Chaparro	Democrat
34th	D+64.83	Thomas P. Giblin	Democrat	Thomas P. Giblin	Democrat
34th	D+64.83	Sheila Oliver	Democrat	Sheila Oliver	Democrat
35th	D+64.89	Shavonda E. Sumter	Democrat	Shavonda E. Sumter	Democrat
35th	D+64.89	Benjie E. Wimberly	Democrat	Benjie E. Wimberly	Democrat
36th	D+27.35	Gary Schaer	Democrat	Gary Schaer	Democrat
36th	D+27.35	Marlene Caride	Democrat	Marlene Caride	Democrat
37th	D+37.01	Gordon M. Johnson	Democrat	Gordon M. Johnson	Democrat
37th	D+37.01	Valerie Huttle	Democrat	Valerie Huttle	Democrat
38th	D+10.05	Joseph Lagana	Democrat	Joseph Lagana	Democrat
38th	D+10.05	Tim Eustace	Democrat	Tim Eustace	Democrat
39th	R+9.39	Holly Schepisi	Republican	Holly Schepisi	Republican
39th	R+9.39	Robert Auth	Republican	Robert Auth	Republican
40th	R+11.68	Scott Rumana	Republican	Scott Rumana	Republican
40th	R+11.68	David C. Russo	Republican	Christopher DePhillips	Republican

=== Close races ===
Districts where the difference of total votes between the top-two parties was under 10%:

1. District 2, 0.3%%
2. District 16, 0.7% gain D
3. District 11, 1.7%
4. District 1, 8.5% gain

== List of races ==
Voters in each legislative district elect two members to the New Jersey General Assembly.

=== District 1 ===
1st Legislative District general election
Party	Candidate	Votes	%
Democratic	Bob Andrzejczak (incumbent)	20,231	27.9
Democratic	R. Bruce Land	19,140	26.4
Republican	Sam Fiocchi (incumbent)	16,818	23.2
Republican	Jim Sauro	16,395	22.6
Write-ins	Personal choice	46	0.1
Total votes		72,630	100.0
One Democratic gain from Republican			

=== District 2 ===
2nd Legislative District general election
Party	Candidate	Votes	%
Republican	Chris A. Brown (incumbent)	18,959	26.5
Democratic	Vince Mazzeo (incumbent)	18,279	25.5
Democratic	Colin Bell	17,433	24.3
Republican	Will Pauls	16,907	23.6
Write-ins	Personal choice	35	0.0
Total votes		71,613	100.0
One Democratic and one Republican hold			

=== District 3 ===
3rd Legislative District general election
Party	Candidate	Votes	%
Democratic	John J. Burzichelli (incumbent)	20,507	28.5
Democratic	Adam Taliaferro (incumbent)	19,480	27.0
Republican	Samuel J. Maccarone Jr.	16,063	22.3
Republican	Leroy P. Pierce III	14,715	20.4
The Peoples Voice	John Kalnas	1,223	1.7
Write-ins	Personal choice	74	0.1
Total votes		71,654	100.0
Democratic hold			

=== District 4 ===
4th Legislative District general election
Party	Candidate	Votes	%
Democratic	Paul D. Moriarty (incumbent)	17,454	30.4
Democratic	Gabriela Mosquera (incumbent)	17,147	29.9
Republican	Kevin P. Murphy	11,592	20.2
Republican	Jack Nicholson	11,131	19.4
Write-ins	Personal choice	63	0.1
Total votes		57,387	100.0
Democratic hold			

=== District 5 ===
Incumbent Angel Fuentes originally ran in the Democratic primary but withdrew his candidacy in June 2015 when he became a deputy county clerk in Camden County. Fuentes and Marianne Holly Cass were replaced on the Democratic ballot by Arthur Barclay and Pat Jones and Ralph Williams was replaced by Keith Walker on the Republican ticket.

5th Legislative District general election
Party	Candidate	Votes	%
Democratic	Patricia Egan Jones	16,766	32.0
Democratic	Arthur Barclay	15,797	32.0
Republican	Keith A. Walker	8,717	17.7
Republican	Kevin P. Ehret	8,045	16.3
Write-ins	Personal choice	50	0.1
Total votes		49,375	100.0
Democratic hold			

=== District 6 ===
Robert Esposito originally won a spot on the Republican ticket in the general election but was replaced on the ballot by Claire Gustafson.

6th Legislative District general election
Party	Candidate	Votes	%
Democratic	Louis Greenwald (incumbent)	21,087	32.6
Democratic	Pamela Rosen Lampitt (incumbent)	20,028	31.0
Republican	Holly Tate	11,023	17.0
Republican	Claire H. Gustafson	10,679	16.5
Green	Amanda Davis	985	1.5
Green	James Bracciante	850	1.3
Write-ins	Personal choice	54	0.1
Total votes		64,706	100.0
Democratic hold			

=== District 7 ===
7th Legislative District general election
Party	Candidate	Votes	%
Democratic	Herb Conaway (incumbent)	22,559	30.9
Democratic	Troy Singleton (incumbent)	22,056	30.3
Republican	Bill Conley	14,272	19.6
Republican	Rob Prisco	13,949	19.1
Write-ins	Personal choice	76	0.1
Total votes		72,912	100.0
Democratic hold			

=== District 8 ===
8th Legislative District general election
Party	Candidate	Votes	%
Republican	Maria Rodriguez-Gregg (incumbent)	18,317	49.5
Republican	Joe Howarth	18,234	49.3
Write-ins	Personal choice	465	1.3
Total votes		37,016	100.0
Republican hold			

=== District 9 ===
9th Legislative District general election
Party	Candidate	Votes	%
Republican	Brian E. Rumpf (incumbent)	24,325	33.4
Republican	DiAnne Gove (incumbent)	23,676	32.5
Democratic	Fran Zimmer	12,638	17.3
Democratic	John Bingham	12,171	16.7
Write-ins	Personal choice	76	0.1
Total votes		72,886	100.0
Republican hold			

=== District 10 ===
10th Legislative District general election
Party	Candidate	Votes	%
Republican	David W. Wolfe (incumbent)	19,882	31.9
Republican	Gregory P. McGuckin (incumbent)	18,543	29.7
Democratic	Kimberley S. Casten	12,302	19.7
Democratic	Valter Must	11,513	18.5
Write-ins	Personal choice	135	0.2
Total votes		62,375	100.0
Republican hold			

=== District 11 ===
11th Legislative District general election
Party	Candidate	Votes	%
Democratic	Eric Houghtaling	15,149	25.6
Democratic	Joann Downey	14,906	25.2
Republican	Mary Pat Angelini (incumbent)	14,653	24.7
Republican	Caroline Casagrande (incumbent)	14,418	24.4
Write-ins	Personal choice	85	0.1
Total votes		59,211	100.0
Two Democratic gains from Republican			

=== District 12 ===
Anthony Washington originally won a spot on the Democratic ticket in the general election but was replaced on the ballot by Robert P. Kurzydlowski.

12th Legislative District general election
Party	Candidate	Votes	%
Republican	Ronald S. Dancer (incumbent)	15,164	29.4
Republican	Robert D. Clifton (incumbent)	14,433	28.0
Democratic	David W. Merwin	10,496	20.4
Democratic	Robert P. Kurzydlowski	10,449	20.3
Green	Stephen Zielinski Sr.	945	1.8
Write-ins	Personal choice (Note: Write in votes not counted by Middlesex or Somerset counties)	85	0.2
Total votes		51,572	100.0
Republican hold			

=== District 13 ===
13th Legislative District general election
Party	Candidate	Votes	%
Republican	Amy Handlin (incumbent)	19,829	30.3
Republican	Declan O'Scanlon (incumbent)	18,977	29.0
Democratic	Thomas Herman	12,934	19.8
Democratic	Jeanne Cullinane	12,779	19.5
Jobs, Sidewalks, Transit	Joshua Leinsdorf	770	1.2
Write-ins	Personal choice	109	0.2
Total votes		65,398	100.0
Republican hold			

=== District 14 ===
14th Legislative District general election
Party	Candidate	Votes	%
Democratic	Wayne DeAngelo (incumbent)	22,319	30.2
Democratic	Daniel R. Benson (incumbent)	21,187	28.7
Republican	David C. Jones	14,474	19.6
Republican	Phil Kaufman	13,937	18.9
Green	Joann Cousin	1,028	1.4
Green	Steven Welzer	957	1.3
Write-ins	Personal choice	23	0.0
Total votes		73,925	100.0
Democratic hold			

=== District 15 ===
15th Legislative District general election
Party	Candidate	Votes	%
Democratic	Reed Gusciora (incumbent)	17,657	35.7
Democratic	Elizabeth Maher Muoio (incumbent)	16,845	34.1
Republican	Anthony L. Giordano	7,502	15.2
Republican	Peter Mendonez Jr.	7,345	14.9
Write-ins	Personal choice	56	0.1
Total votes		49,405	100.0
Democratic hold			

=== District 16 ===
On election night, the returns initially showed incumbent Republican Donna Simon ahead of Democrat Andrew Zwicker. That night, Zwicker delivered a concession speech though later returns that night put him ahead of Simon. After all provisional ballots were counted in the four counties comprising the district, Simon conceded on November 16. Zwicker is the first Democrat to ever represent the 16th legislative district.

16th Legislative District general election
Party	Candidate	Votes	%
Republican	Jack Ciattarelli (incumbent)	16,577	25.4
Democratic	Andrew Zwicker	16,308	25.0
Republican	Donna Simon (incumbent)	16,230	24.9
Democratic	Maureen Vella	16,043	24.6
Write-ins	Personal choice	29	0.0
Total votes		65,187	100.0
One Republican hold, one Democratic gain from Republican			

=== District 17 ===
17th Legislative District general election
Party	Candidate	Votes	%
Democratic	Joseph V. Egan (incumbent)	13,444	33.9
Democratic	Joseph Danielsen (incumbent)	13,426	33.9
Republican	Robert Mettler	6,362	16.0
Republican	Brajesh Singh	2,430	13.7
Green	Molly O'Brien	985	2.5
Total votes		39,647	100.0
Democratic hold			

=== District 18 ===
18th Legislative District general election
Party	Candidate	Votes	%
Democratic	Patrick J. Diegnan (incumbent)	16,256	31.9
Democratic	Nancy Pinkin (incumbent)	16,113	31.6
Republican	Teresa Rose Hutchison	9,432	18.5
Republican	Synnove Bakke	9,123	17.9
Total votes		50,924	100.0
Democratic hold			

=== District 19 ===
Reyes Ortega originally won a spot on the Republican ticket in the general election but was replaced on the ballot by Jesus Varela.

19th Legislative District general election
Party	Candidate	Votes	%
Democratic	John Wisniewski (incumbent)	16,159	36.3
Democratic	Craig Coughlin (incumbent)	15,880	35.6
Republican	Thomas E. Maras	6,597	14.8
Republican	Jesus Varela	5,916	13.3
Total votes		44,552	100.0
Democratic hold			

=== District 20 ===
20th Legislative District general election
Party	Candidate	Votes	%
Democratic	Annette Quijano (incumbent)	12,061	39.3
Democratic	Jamel Holley (incumbent)	11,568	37.7
Republican	Stephen E. Kozlovich	3,593	11.7
Republican	Roger Stryeski	3,398	11.1
Write-ins	Personal choice	57	0.2
Total votes		30,677	100.0
Democratic hold			

=== District 21 ===
21st Legislative District general election
Party	Candidate	Votes	%
Republican	Jon Bramnick (incumbent)	20,024	29.9
Republican	Nancy Munoz (incumbent)	19,783	29.5
Democratic	Jill Anne LaZare	13,804	20.6
Democratic	David Barnett	13,378	20.0
Write-ins	Personal choice	49	0.1
Total votes		67,038	100.0
Republican hold			

=== District 22 ===
22nd Legislative District general election
Party	Candidate	Votes	%
Democratic	James J. Kennedy	12,087	30.5
Democratic	Jerry Green (incumbent)	11,769	29.7
Republican	William Vastine	8,076	20.4
Republican	William H. Michelson	7,666	19.3
Write-ins	Personal choice	47	0.1
Total votes		39,645	100.0
Democratic hold			

=== District 23 ===
23rd Legislative District general election
Party	Candidate	Votes	%
Republican	John DiMaio (incumbent)	17,654	32.3
Republican	Erik Peterson (incumbent)	17,071	31.2
Democratic	Maria Rodriguez	10,056	18.4
Democratic	Marybeth Maciag	9,759	17.8
Write-ins	Personal choice	148	0.3
Total votes		54,688	100.0
Republican hold			

=== District 24 ===
24th Legislative District general election
Party	Candidate	Votes	%
Republican	Parker Space (incumbent)	18,058	34.8
Republican	Gail Phoebus	17,217	33.2
Democratic	Jacqueline Stapel	7,165	13.8
Democratic	Michael F. Grace	6,998	13.5
Green	Kenneth Collins	2,227	4.3
Write-ins	Personal choice	210	0.4
Total votes		51,875	100.0
Republican hold			

=== District 25 ===
25th Legislative District general election
Party	Candidate	Votes	%
Republican	Tony Bucco (incumbent)	13,947	29.4
Republican	Michael Patrick Carroll (incumbent)	13,372	28.2
Democratic	Richard J. Corcoran III	10,230	21.5
Democratic	Thomas Moran	9,849	20.7
Write-ins	Personal choice	69	0.1
Total votes		47,494	100.0
Republican hold			

=== District 26 ===
26th Legislative District general election
Party	Candidate	Votes	%
Republican	Jay Webber (incumbent)	13,739	30.2
Republican	BettyLou DeCroce (incumbent)	13,666	30.1
Democratic	Avery Hart	8,805	19.4
Democratic	Wayne B. Marek	8,525	18.8
Green	Jimmy D. Brash	666	1.5
Write-ins	Personal choice	40	0.1
Total votes		45,441	100.0
Republican hold			

=== District 27 ===
27th Legislative District general election
Party	Candidate	Votes	%
Democratic	John F. McKeon (incumbent)	19,128	29.4
Democratic	Mila Jasey (incumbent)	17,971	27.6
Republican	Wonkyu Rim	13,896	21.3
Republican	Tayfun Selen	12,957	19.9
Libertarian	Jeff Hetrick	616	0.9
Libertarian	Damien Caillaut	564	0.9
Write-ins	Personal choice	37	0.1
Total votes		65,169	100.0
Democratic hold			

=== District 28 ===
28th Legislative District general election
Party	Candidate	Votes	%
Democratic	Ralph R. Caputo (incumbent)	9,512	43.2
Democratic	Cleopatra Tucker (incumbent)	9,186	41.7
Republican	David H. Pinckney	1,661	7.5
Republican	Darnel C. Henry	1,646	7.5
Write-ins	Personal choice	36	0.2
Total votes		22,041	100.0
Democratic hold			

=== District 29 ===
29th Legislative District general election
Party	Candidate	Votes	%
Democratic	L. Grace Spencer (incumbent)	7,146	42.8
Democratic	Eliana Pintor Marin (incumbent)	6,539	39.1
Republican	Nicholas G. Campione	1,409	8.4
Republican	Jeannette Veras	1,077	6.4
Wake Up Jersey	Pablo Olivera	498	3.0
Write-ins	Personal choice	38	0.2
Total votes		16,707	100.0
Democratic hold			

=== District 30 ===
Jimmy Esposito originally won a spot on the Democratic ticket in the general election but was replaced on the ballot by Lorna Phillipson.

30th Legislative District general election
Party	Candidate	Votes	%
Republican	Sean T. Kean (incumbent)	19,826	34.5
Republican	Dave Rible (incumbent)	19,459	33.8
Democratic	Jim Keady	9,148	15.9
Democratic	Lorna Phillipson	7,867	13.7
Economic Growth	Hank Schroeder	1,101	1.9
Write-ins	Personal choice	109	0.2
Total votes		57,510	100.0
Republican hold			

=== District 31 ===
31st Legislative District general election
Party	Candidate	Votes	%
Democratic	Angela V. McKnight	9,597	35.3
Democratic	Nicholas Chiaravalloti	9,212	33.9
Republican	Matthew Kopko	3,872	14.2
Republican	Herminio Mendoza	2,603	9.6
Your Independent Leadership	Anthony Zanowic	958	3.5
Your Independent Leadership	Alejandro Rodriguez	934	3.4
Write-ins	Personal choice	32	0.1
Total votes		27,208	100.0
Democratic hold			

=== District 32 ===
32nd Legislative District general election
Party	Candidate	Votes	%
Democratic	Vincent Prieto (incumbent)	12,276	43.0
Democratic	Angelica M. Jimenez (incumbent)	11,805	41.4
Republican	Lisamarie Tusa	2,223	7.8
Republican	Frank Miqueli	2,212	7.8
Write-ins	Personal choice	21	0.1
Total votes		28,537	100.0
Democratic hold			

=== District 33 ===
33rd Legislative District general election
Party	Candidate	Votes	%
Democratic	Annette Chaparro	12,338	39.5
Democratic	Raj Mukherji (incumbent)	11,978	38.4
Republican	Garrett P. Simulcik Jr.	3,556	11.4
Republican	Javier Sosa	3,260	10.4
Write-ins	Personal choice	91	0.3
Total votes		31,223	100.0
Democratic hold			

=== District 34 ===
Louis Rodriguez originally won a spot on the Republican ticket in the general election but withdrew his candidacy from the general election due to a federal job.

34th Legislative District general election
Party	Candidate	Votes	%
Democratic	Thomas P. Giblin (incumbent)	13,436	42.2
Democratic	Sheila Oliver (incumbent)	13,294	41.8
Republican	John M. Traier	4,025	12.6
A Better Tomorrow	Clenard H. Childress Jr.	977	3.1
Write-ins	Personal choice	88	0.3
Total votes		31,820	100.0
Democratic hold			

=== District 35 ===
35th Legislative District general election
Party	Candidate	Votes	%
Democratic	Benjie E. Wimberly (incumbent)	11,905	36.4
Democratic	Shavonda E. Sumter (incumbent)	11,904	36.4
Republican	David Jimenez	4,522	13.8
Republican	Ilia Villanueva	4,333	13.3
Write-ins	Personal choice	13	0.0
Total votes		32,677	100.0
Democratic hold			

=== District 36 ===
36th Legislative District general election
Party	Candidate	Votes	%
Democratic	Gary Schaer (incumbent)	15,125	33.1
Democratic	Marlene Caride (incumbent)	14,788	32.3
Republican	Forrest Elliott Jr.	7,835	17.1
Republican	James A. Lenoy	7,510	16.4
NSA Did 911	Jeff Boss	430	0.9
Write-ins	Personal choice	39	0.1
Total votes		45,727	100.0
Democratic hold			

=== District 37 ===
37th Legislative District general election
Party	Candidate	Votes	%
Democratic	Valerie Huttle (incumbent)	18,930	35.9
Democratic	Gordon M. Johnson (incumbent)	18,869	35.8
Republican	Joseph M. Fiscella	7,598	14.4
Republican	Gino P. Tessaro	7,338	13.9
Write-ins	Personal choice	45	0.1
Total votes		52,780	100.0
Democratic hold			

=== District 38 ===
Anthony Cappola initially dropped out of the race on October 1 following the discovery of a controversial satirical book entitled Outrageous! written by Cappola. Bergen County Republicans picked attorney Fernando Alonso to replace Cappola on the ballot pending the allowance of the replacement candidate on the ballot. The Republicans unexpectedly dropped the effort to have the candidate replaced on October 13 and Cappola later announced his intention to continue in the race.

38th Legislative District general election
Party	Candidate	Votes	%
Democratic	Tim Eustace (incumbent)	19,563	29.1
Democratic	Joseph Lagana (incumbent)	19,511	29.0
Republican	Mark DiPisa	14,721	21.9
Republican	Anthony Cappola	13,339	19.8
Write-ins	Personal choice	95	0.1
Total votes		67,229	100.0
Democratic hold			

=== District 39 ===
39th Legislative District general election
Party	Candidate	Votes	%
Republican	Holly Schepisi (incumbent)	22,016	31.3
Republican	Robert Auth (incumbent)	20,227	28.7
Democratic	John Derienzo	14,258	20.3
Democratic	Jeffrey Goldsmith	13,840	19.7
Write-ins	Personal choice	28	0.0
Total votes		70,369	100.0
Republican hold			

=== District 40 ===
40th Legislative District general election
Party	Candidate	Votes	%
Republican	David C. Russo (incumbent)	19,675	28.0
Republican	Scott Rumana (incumbent)	19,357	27.5
Democratic	Christine Ordway	15,629	22.2
Democratic	Paul Vagianos	15,573	22.2
Write-ins	Personal choice	63	0.1
Total votes		70,297	100.0
Republican hold			

== See also ==
- 2015 New Jersey elections
