= 218th New Jersey Legislature =

2018 to 2019 legislative session

←	217th Legislature	219th Legislature	→
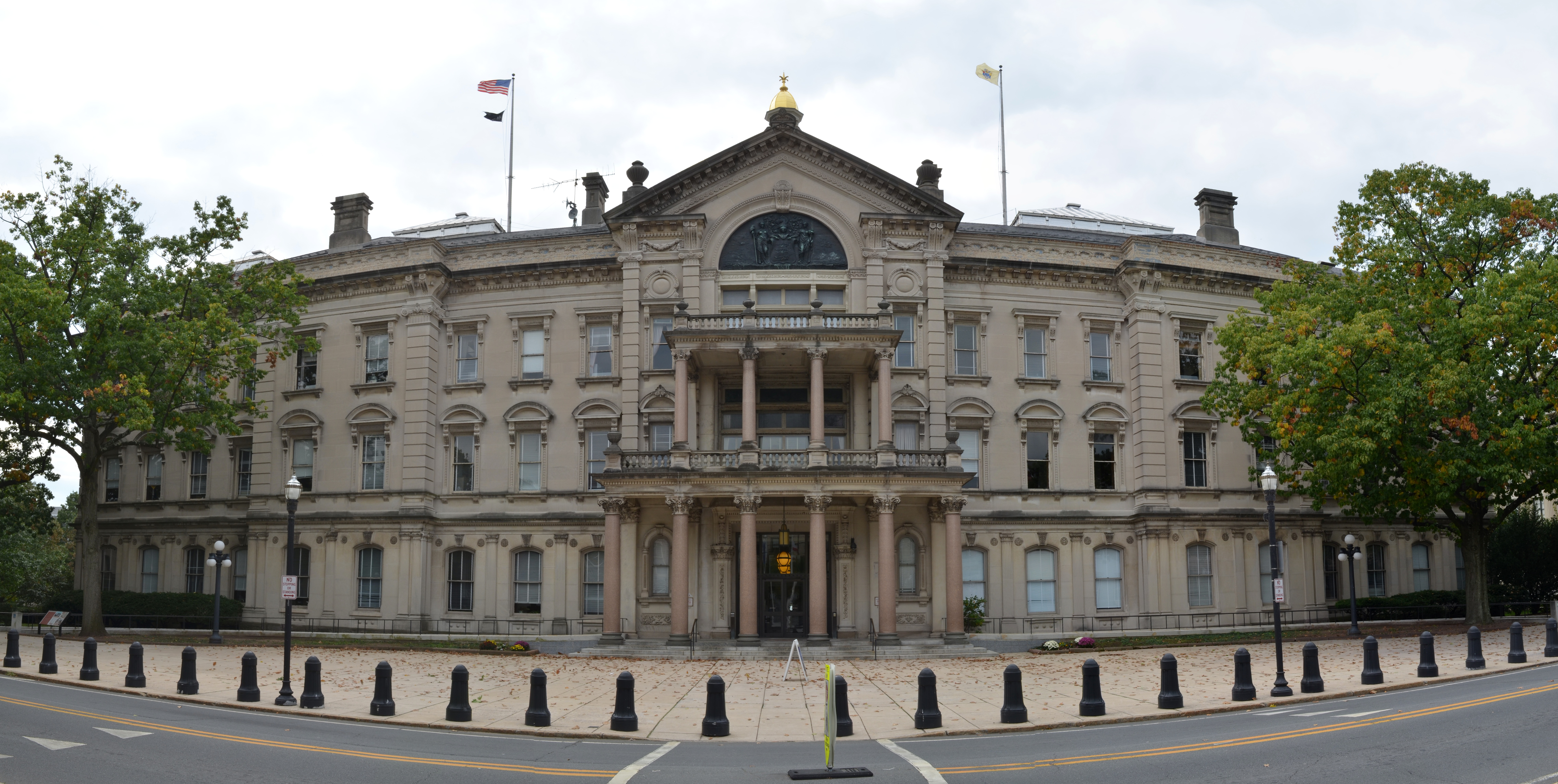
- New Jersey State House Northern Panorama, 2012

Overview
- Legislative body: New Jersey Legislature
- Jurisdiction: New Jersey, United States
- Term: January 9, 2018 – January 14, 2020

New Jersey Senate
- Members: 40
- President: Stephen M. Sweeney
- Minority Leader: Thomas Kean Jr.
- Party control: Democratic Party

New Jersey General Assembly
- Members: 80
- Speaker: Craig Coughlin
- Minority Leader: Jon Bramnick
- Party control: Democratic Party

The 218th New Jersey Legislature began on January 9, 2018 following the 2017 Elections. The session started in the end of Chris Christie's governorship and continued in the first two years of Phil Murphy's governorship.

== Background ==
The elections were held on November 7, 2017 alongside the 2017 New Jersey gubernatorial election. Phil Murphy and Sheila Oliver were elected Governor and Lieutenant Governor. In the elections for Senate republicans lost a net gain of one seat while in the Assembly elections republicans lost a net gain of two. In the only state senate election of 2019 incumbent Democratic Senator Bob Andrzejczak lost re-election to Republican Mike Testa.

== Party composition ==
=== Assembly ===
New Jersey General Assembly partisan breakdown

Affiliation	Members
Democratic Party	54
Republican Party	26
Total	80

=== Senate ===
Partisan breakdown of the New Jersey Senate

Affiliation	Members
Democratic Party	25
Republican Party	15
Total	40

== Leadership ==
=== Senate ===
Position	Name	District
President of the Senate	Stephen M. Sweeney	District 3
Majority Leader	Loretta Weinberg	District 37
President pro tempore	Teresa Ruiz	District 29
Deputy Majority Leaders	Sandra Bolden Cunningham; Paul Sarlo	District 31; District 36
Assistant Majority Leaders	James Beach; Linda R. Greenstein	District 6 District 14
Majority Conference Leader	Robert M. Gordon	District 38
Majority Whip		
Minority Leader	Thomas Kean Jr.	District 21
Deputy Minority Leader	Robert Singer	District 30
Minority Conference Leader	Steve Oroho	District 24
Deputy Minority Conference Leader	Chris A. Brown	District 2
Minority Whip	Joseph Pennacchio	District 26
Deputy Minority Whip	Kristin Corrado	District 40
Republican Budget Officer	Anthony Bucco	District 25

=== Assembly ===
Democratic Leadership	Republican Leadership
Senate President, Craig Coughlin; Majority Leader, Louis Greenwald; Speaker Pro-Tempore, Gordon M. Johnson; Conference Chair, Shavonda E. Sumter	Minority Leader, Jon Bramnick; Deputy Minority Leaders, Ronald S. Dancer, David W. Wolfe, Amy Handlin; Minority Whip, Nancy Munoz; Conference Chair, Tony Bucco

== Members ==
=== Senate ===
Senators for the 2018-19 legislative session are:

District	Name	Party	Residence	First served
District 1	Mike Testa	Rep	Vineland	2019‡
District 2	Chris A. Brown	Rep	Ventnor City	2018
District 3	Stephen M. Sweeney	Dem	West Deptford Township	2002
District 4	Fred H. Madden	Dem	Washington Township (Gloucester)	2004
District 5	Nilsa Cruz-Perez	Dem	Barrington	2014†
District 6	James Beach	Dem	Voorhees Township	2009†
District 7	Troy Singleton	Dem	Palmyra	2018
District 8	Dawn Marie Addiego	Dem^{1}	Evesham Township	2010†
District 9	Christopher J. Connors	Rep	Lacey Township	2008
District 10	James W. Holzapfel	Rep	Toms River	2012
District 11	Vin Gopal	Dem	Long Branch	2018
District 12	Samuel D. Thompson	Rep	Old Bridge Township	2012
District 13	Declan O'Scanlon	Rep	Little Silver	2018
District 14	Linda R. Greenstein	Dem	Plainsboro Township	2010‡
District 15	Shirley Turner	Dem	Lawrence Township (Mercer)	1998
District 16	Christopher Bateman	Rep	Branchburg	2008
District 17	Bob Smith	Dem	Piscataway	2002
District 18	Patrick J. Diegnan	Dem	South Plainfield	2016†
District 19	Joe Vitale	Dem	Woodbridge Township	1998
District 20	Joseph Cryan	Dem	Union Township (Union)	2018
District 21	Thomas Kean Jr.	Rep	Westfield	2003†
District 22	Nicholas Scutari	Dem	Linden	2004
District 23	Michael J. Doherty	Rep	Washington Township (Warren)	2009‡
District 24	Steve Oroho	Rep	Franklin	2008
District 25	Tony Bucco	Rep	Boonton Township	2019†
District 26	Joseph Pennacchio	Rep	Montville	2008
District 27	Richard Codey	Dem	Roseland	1982
District 28	Ronald Rice	Dem	Newark	1986‡
District 29	Teresa Ruiz	Dem	Newark	2008
District 30	Robert Singer	Rep	Lakewood Township	1993†
District 31	Sandra Bolden Cunningham	Dem	Jersey City	2007†
District 32	Nicholas Sacco	Dem	North Bergen	1994
District 33	Brian P. Stack	Dem	Union City	2008
District 34	Nia Gill	Dem	Montclair	2002
District 35	Nellie Pou	Dem	North Haledon	2012
District 36	Paul Sarlo	Dem	Wood-Ridge	2003†
District 37	Loretta Weinberg	Dem	Teaneck	2005†
District 38	Joseph Lagana	Dem	Paramus	2018†
District 39	Gerald Cardinale	Rep	Demarest	1982
District 40	Kristin Corrado	Rep	Totowa	2017†

† First appointed to the seat
‡ Elected in a special election
^{1} Addiego had served as a Republican prior to 2019

==== Former members from this term ====
District	Name	Party	Residence	First served	Left office	Cause	Replaced by
38	Robert M. Gordon	Dem	Fair Lawn	2008	April 4, 2018	Appointed to the New Jersey Board of Public Utilities	Joseph Lagana
1	Jeff Van Drew	Dem	Dennis Township	2008	January 2, 2019	Elected to the U.S. House of Representatives	Bob Andrzejczak
25	Anthony Bucco	Rep	Boonton	1998	September 16, 2019	Death (heart attack)	Tony Bucco
1	Bob Andrzejczak	Dem	Middle Township	2019†	December 5, 2019	Appointee defeated in special election for completion of unexpired term	Mike Testa

==== Committees and Committee Chairs, 2018–2019 Legislative Session ====
Committee chairs are: (All are Democrats)

Committee	Name of Committee Chair
Budget and Appropriations	Paul Sarlo
Commerce	Nellie Pou
Community and Urban Affairs	Troy Singleton
Economic Growth	Nilsa Cruz-Perez
Education	Teresa Ruiz
Environment and Energy	Bob Smith
Health, Human Services and Senior Citizens	Joe Vitale
Higher Education	Sandra Bolden Cunningham
Judiciary	Nicholas Scutari
Labor	Fred H. Madden
Law and Public Safety	Linda R. Greenstein
Legislative Oversight	Brian P. Stack
Military and Veterans' Affairs	Vin Gopal
Select Committee on Economic Growth Strategies	Bob Smith
Select Committee on NJ Transit	Steve Sweeney
State Government, Wagering, Tourism & Historic Preservation	James Beach
Transportation	Patrick J. Diegnan

=== Assembly ===
The Assembly has 80 members, two for each district. Membership of the General Assembly is as follows:

District	Name	Party	Residence	First served
District 1	R. Bruce Land	Dem	Vineland	2016
District 1	Matthew W. Milam	Dem	Vineland	2019 (Note: First appointed to the seat) (Note: Previously served in the Assembly from 2008–2013)
District 2	John Armato	Dem	Buena Vista Township	2018
District 2	Vince Mazzeo	Dem	Northfield	2014
District 3	John J. Burzichelli	Dem	Paulsboro	2002
District 3	Adam Taliaferro	Dem	Woolwich Township	2015
District 4	Paul Moriarty	Dem	Washington Township (Gloucester)	2006
District 4	Gabriela Mosquera	Dem	Gloucester Township	2012
District 5	Patricia Egan Jones	Dem	Barrington	2015
District 5	William Spearman	Dem	Camden	2018
District 6	Louis Greenwald	Dem	Voorhees Township	1996
District 6	Pamela Rosen Lampitt	Dem	Cherry Hill	2006
District 7	Herb Conaway	Dem	Delanco Township	1998
District 7	Carol A. Murphy	Dem	Mount Laurel	2018
District 8	Joe Howarth	Rep	Evesham Township	2016
District 8	Ryan Peters	Rep	Hainesport Township	2018
District 9	DiAnne Gove	Rep	Long Beach Township	2009
District 9	Brian E. Rumpf	Rep	Little Egg Harbor	2003
District 10	Gregory P. McGuckin	Rep	Toms River	2012
District 10	David W. Wolfe	Rep	Brick Township	1992
District 11	Joann Downey	Dem	Freehold Township	2016
District 11	Eric Houghtaling	Dem	Neptune Township	2016
District 12	Robert D. Clifton	Rep	Matawan	2012
District 12	Ronald S. Dancer	Rep	Plumsted Township	2002
District 13	Serena DiMaso	Rep	Holmdel Township	2018
District 13	Amy Handlin	Rep	Middletown Township	2006
District 14	Daniel R. Benson	Dem	Hamilton Township (Mercer)	2011
District 14	Wayne DeAngelo	Dem	Hamilton Township (Mercer)	2008
District 15	Verlina Reynolds-Jackson	Dem	Trenton	2018
District 15	Anthony Verrelli	Dem	Hopewell Township (Mercer)	2018
District 16	Roy Freiman	Dem	Hillsborough Township	2018
District 16	Andrew Zwicker	Dem	South Brunswick	2016
District 17	Joseph Danielsen	Dem	Franklin Township (Somerset)	2014
District 17	Joseph V. Egan	Dem	New Brunswick	2002
District 18	Robert Karabinchak	Dem	Edison	2016
District 18	Nancy Pinkin	Dem	East Brunswick	2014
District 19	Craig Coughlin	Dem	Woodbridge Township	2010
District 19	Yvonne Lopez	Dem	Perth Amboy	2018
District 20	Jamel Holley	Dem	Roselle	2015
District 20	Annette Quijano	Dem	Elizabeth	2008
District 21	Jon Bramnick	Rep	Westfield	2003
District 21	Nancy Munoz	Rep	Summit	2009
District 22	Linda Carter	Dem	Plainfield	2018
District 22	James J. Kennedy	Dem	Rahway	2016
District 23	John DiMaio	Rep	Hackettstown	2009
District 23	Erik Peterson	Rep	Franklin Township (Hunterdon)	2009
District 24	Parker Space	Rep	Wantage Township	2013
District 24	Harold J. Wirths	Rep	Hardyston Township	2018
District 25	Michael Patrick Carroll	Rep	Morris Township	1996
District 25	Aura K. Dunn	Rep	Mendham Borough	2019
District 26	BettyLou DeCroce	Rep	Parsippany-Troy Hills	2012
District 26	Jay Webber	Rep	Morris Plains	2008
District 27	Mila Jasey	Dem	South Orange	2007
District 27	John F. McKeon	Dem	West Orange	2002
District 28	Ralph R. Caputo	Dem	Bloomfield	2008 (Note: Previously served in the Assembly as a Republican from 1968–1972)
District 28	Cleopatra Tucker	Dem	Newark	2008
District 29	Eliana Pintor Marin	Dem	Newark	2013
District 29	Shanique Speight	Dem	Newark	2018
District 30	Sean T. Kean	Rep	Wall Township	2012 (Note: Previously served in the Assembly from 2002–2008)
District 30	Ned Thomson	Rep	Wall Township	2017
District 31	Nicholas Chiaravalloti	Dem	Bayonne	2016
District 31	Angela V. McKnight	Dem	Jersey City	2016
District 32	Angelica M. Jimenez	Dem	West New York	2012
District 32	Pedro Mejia	Dem	Secaucus	2018
District 33	Annette Chaparro	Dem	Hoboken	2016
District 33	Raj Mukherji	Dem	Jersey City	2014
District 34	Thomas P. Giblin	Dem	Montclair	2006
District 34	Britnee Timberlake	Dem	East Orange	2018
District 35	Shavonda E. Sumter	Dem	Paterson	2012
District 35	Benjie Wimberly	Dem	Paterson	2012
District 36	Clinton Calabrese	Dem	Cliffside Park	2018
District 36	Gary Schaer	Dem	Passaic	2006
District 37	Valerie Huttle	Dem	Englewood	2006
District 37	Gordon M. Johnson	Dem	Englewood	2002
District 38	Lisa Swain	Dem	Fair Lawn	2018
District 38	Chris Tully	Dem	Bergenfield	2018
District 39	Robert Auth	Rep	Old Tappan	2010
District 39	Holly Schepisi	Rep	River Vale	2012
District 40	Christopher DePhillips	Rep	Wyckoff	2018
District 40	Kevin J. Rooney	Rep	Wyckoff	2016

==== Former members from this term ====
District	Name	Party	Residence	First served	Left office	Cause	Replaced by
District 34	Sheila Oliver	Dem	East Orange	2004	January 9, 2018	Took office as Lieutenant Governor of New Jersey	Britnee Timberlake
District 15	Elizabeth Maher Muoio	Dem	Pennington	2015	January 15, 2018	Appointed State Treasurer of New Jersey	Verlina Reynolds-Jackson
District 36	Marlene Caride	Dem	Ridgefield	2012	January 16, 2018	Appointed Commissioner of the New Jersey Department of Banking and Insurance	Clinton Calabrese
District 32	Vincent Prieto	Dem	Secaucus	2004	February 26, 2018	Resigned to become President and CEO of the New Jersey Sports and Exposition Authority	Pedro Mejia
District 38	Joseph Lagana	Dem	Paramus	2014	April 12, 2018	Appointed to the District's Senate seat	Lisa Swain; Chris Tully
District 38	Tim Eustace	Dem	Maywood	2012	April 13, 2018	Resigned to become Deputy Director of the North Jersey District Water Supply Commission	Lisa Swain; Chris Tully
District 22	Jerry Green	Dem	Plainfield	1992	April 18, 2018	Death (long illness)	Linda Carter
District 5	Arthur Barclay	Dem	Camden	2016	June 18, 2018	Resigned following arrest for simple assault	William Spearman
District 15	Reed Gusciora	Dem	Trenton	1996	June 30, 2018	Elected Mayor of Trenton	Anthony Verrelli
District 1	Bob Andrzejczak	Dem	Middle Township	2013	January 14, 2019	Appointed to the District's Senate seat	Matthew W. Milam
District 25	Tony Bucco	Rep	Boonton Township	2010	October 24, 2019	Appointed to the District's Senate seat	Aura K. Dunn

==== Committees and Committee Chairs, 2018–2019 Legislative Session ====
Committee chairs are: (All are Democrats)

Committee	Name of Committee Chair
Agriculture and Natural Resources	Eric Houghtaling
Appropriations	John Burzichelli
Budget	Eliana Pintor Marin
Commerce and Economic Development	Gordon M. Johnson
Consumer Affairs	Paul D. Moriarty
Education	Pamela R. Lampitt
Environment and Solid Waste	Nancy Pinkin
Financial Institutions and Insurance	John F. McKeon
Health and Senior Services	Herb Conaway
Higher Education	Mila Jasey
Homeland Security and State Preparedness	Valerie Vainieri Huttle
Housing and Community Development	Benjie Wimberly
Human Services	Joann Downey
Judiciary	Annette Quijano
Labor	Joseph V. Egan
Law and Public Safety	Adam Taliaferro
Military and Veterans' Affairs	Cleopatra Tucker
Oversight, Reform and Federal Relations	Joseph Danielsen
Regulated Professions	Thomas Giblin
Science, Innovation and Technology	Andrew Zwicker
State and Local Government	Vincent Mazzeo
Telecommunications and Utilities	Wayne DeAngelo
Tourism, Gaming and the Arts	Ralph Caputo
Transportation and Independent Authorities	Daniel R. Benson
Women and Children	Gabriela Mosquera

== Vacancies ==
=== Senate ===
District	Original	Party	Period of vacancy	Appointee	Party of Appointee	Winner of Special Election	Winner's Party
38th	Robert M. Gordon	Democratic Party	April 4, 2018 – April 12, 2018	Joseph Lagana	Democratic Party	Joseph Lagana	Democratic Party
1st	Jeff Van Drew	Democratic Party	December 31, 2018 – January 15, 2019	Bob Andrzejczak	Democratic Party	Mike Testa	Republican Party
25th	Anthony Bucco	Republican Party	September 16, 2019 - October 25, 2019	Tony Bucco	Republican Party	TBD	TBD

=== Assembly ===
District	Original	Party	Period of vacancy	Appointee	Party of Appointee	Winner of Special Election	Winner's Party
34th	Sheila Oliver	Democratic Party	January 9, 2018 – January 29, 2018	Britnee Timberlake	Democratic Party	Britnee Timberlake	Democratic Party
15th	Elizabeth Maher Muoio	Democratic Party	January 15, 2018 – February 15, 2018	Verlina Reynolds-Jackson	Democratic Party	Verlina Reynolds-Jackson	Democratic Party
36th	Marlene Caride	Democratic Party	January 16, 2018 – February 8, 2018	Clinton Calabrese	Democratic Party	Clinton Calabrese	Democratic Party
32nd	Vincent Prieto	Democratic Party	February 26, 2018 – April 12, 2018	Pedro Mejia	Democratic Party	Pedro Mejia	Democratic Party
38th	Joseph Lagana	Democratic Party	April 12, 2018 – May 24, 2018	Lisa Swain	Democratic Party	Lisa Swain	Democratic Party
38th	Tim Eustace	Democratic Party	April 13, 2018 – May 24, 2018	Chris Tully	Democratic Party	Chris Tully	Democratic Party
22nd	Jerry Green	Democratic Party	April 18, 2018 – May 24, 2018	Linda Carter	Democratic Party	Linda Carter	Democratic Party
5th	Arthur Barclay	Democratic Party	June 18, 2018 – June 30, 2018	William Spearman	Democratic Party	William Spearman	Democratic Party
15th	Reed Gusciora	Democratic Party	July 1, 2018 – August 5, 2018	Anthony Verrelli	Democratic Party	Anthony Verrelli	Democratic Party
1st	Bob Andrzejczak	Democratic Party	January 14, 2019 – February 1, 2019	Matthew Milam	Democratic Party	No special Election will be held	No special Election will be held
25th	Tony Bucco	Republican Party	October 25, 2019 – November 25, 2019	Aura K. Dunn	Republican Party	TBD	TBD

== Governors ==
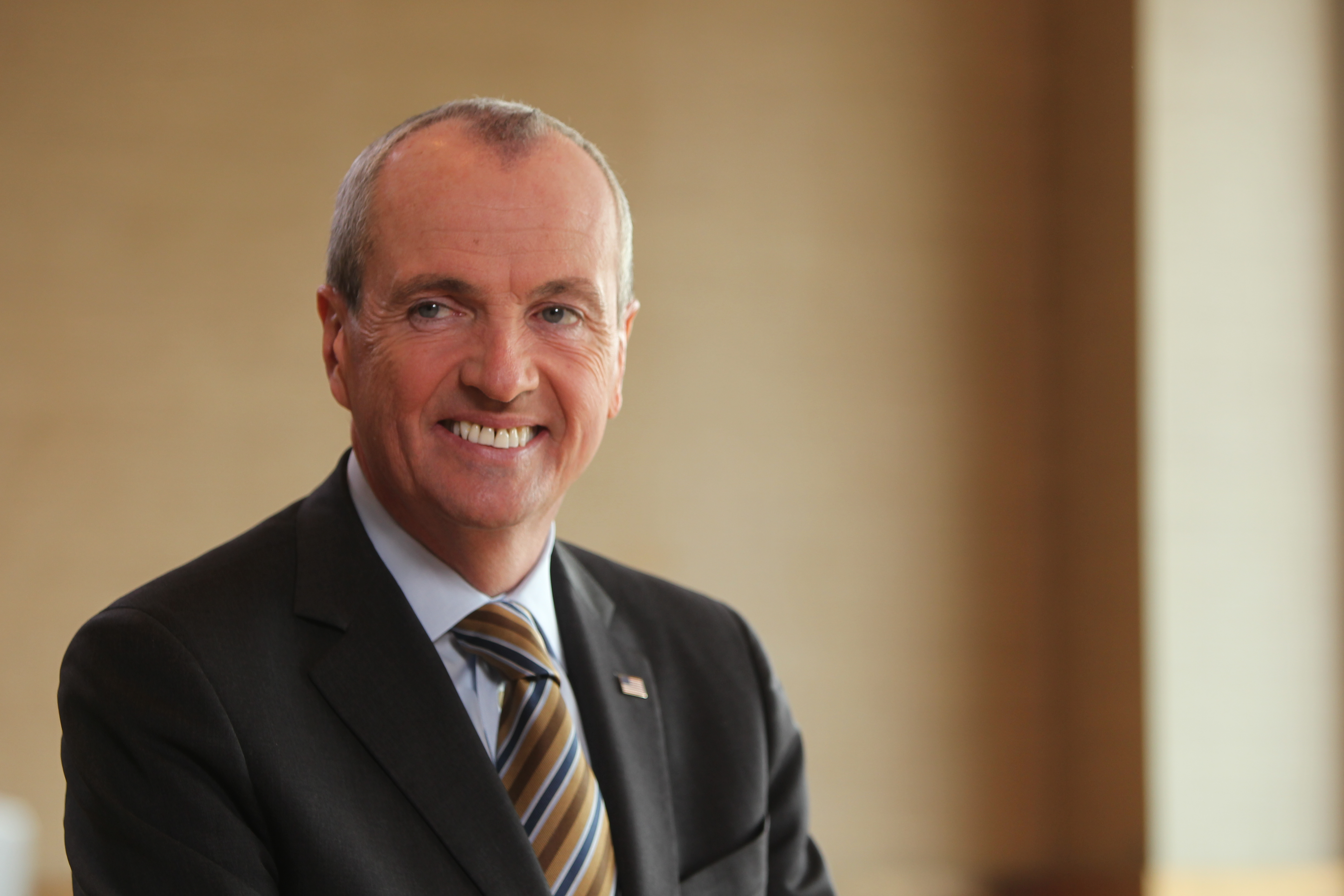
Governor Phil Murphy

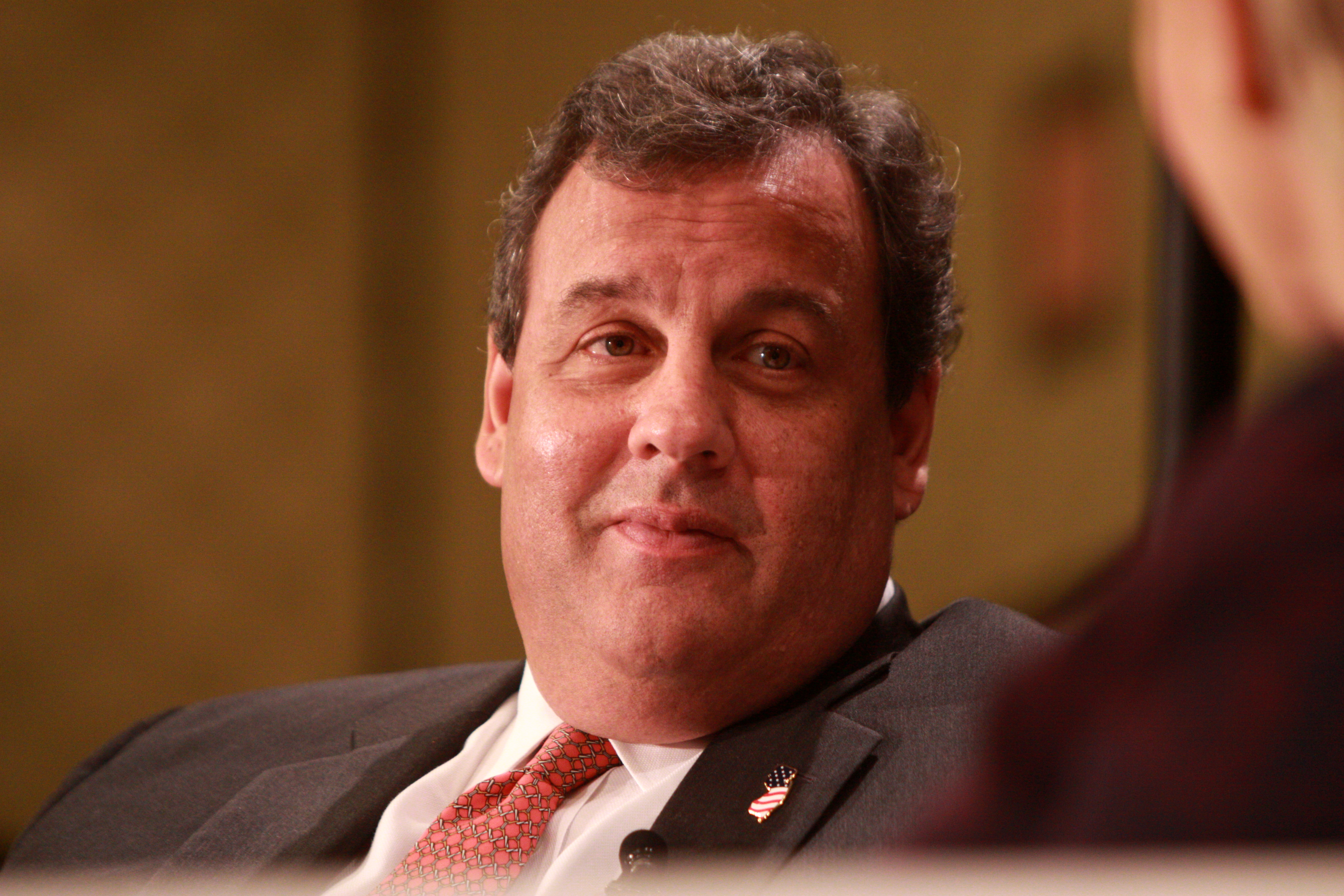
Former Governor Chris Christie

Outgoing Governor Chris Christie delivered is last State of the State on January 9, 2018. He touted his legacy as Governor, such as his response to Hurricane Sandy, among other things. On January 15, 2019 Governor Phil Murphy gave his first State of the State Address. In his address he called on the legislature to raise the minimum wage from $8 to $15, legalize recreational marijuana, and to act on tax reform. He also touted his achievements in his first year such as raising income taxes on people making more than $5 million a year, beginning to make community college tuition free, increasing funding to Planned Parenthood, and tighter gun laws. Again on March 5, 2019 Murphy addressed the Legislature to deliver his budget address. In the address he called for universal pre-k, eliminating tuition for community college, a millionaires tax, and increased spending. Senate President Stephen M. Sweeney, and Assembly Speaker Craig Coughlin said they are opposed to Murphy's proposed tax increases. On June 20, 2019 the Assembly and Senate passed a budget without Murphy's millionaires tax. In the Senate, seven republicans, Declan O'Scanlon, Kip Bateman, Tom Kean, Kristin Corrado, Bob Singer, and Sam Thompson, voted for the budget. Murphy line-item vetoed the budget.

== See also ==
- List of New Jersey state legislatures
