= 217th New Jersey Legislature =

2016 to 2017 legislative session

←	216th Legislature	218th Legislature	→
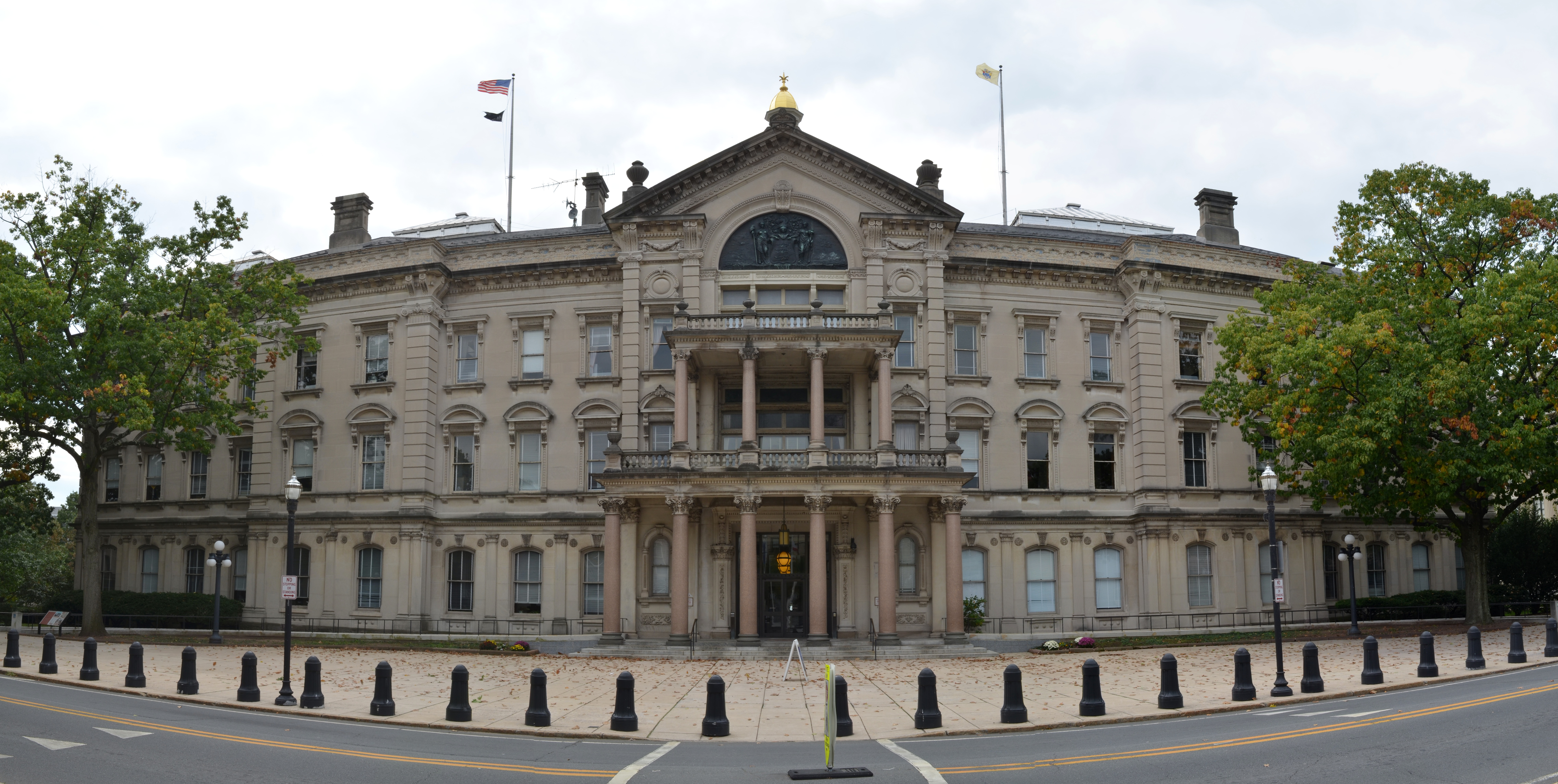
- New Jersey State House north panorama, 2012

Overview
- Legislative body: New Jersey Legislature
- Jurisdiction: New Jersey, United States
- Term: January 12, 2016 – January 9, 2018

New Jersey Senate
- Members: 40
- President: Stephen M. Sweeney
- Minority Leader: Thomas Kean Jr.
- Party control: Democratic Party

New Jersey General Assembly
- Members: 80
- Speaker: Vincent Prieto
- Minority Leader: Jon Bramnick
- Party control: Democratic Party

The 217th New Jersey Legislature began on January 12, 2016 and ended on January 9, 2018, in the last two years of the Governorship of Chris Christie.

== Background ==
The elections for the Assembly were held on November 3, 2015, while elections for the Senate were held on November 5, 2013. In the 2015 Assembly elections, Democrats gained four seats in the Assembly, giving them 52 seats in the Assembly. The incumbents that lost re-election were Sam Fiocchi, Mary Pat Angelini, Caroline Casagrande, and Donna Simon.

== Party composition ==
=== Assembly ===
New Jersey Assembly Partisan Breakdown, 2016-2018

Affiliation	Members
Democratic Party	52
Republican Party	28
Total	80

=== Senate ===
New Jersey Senate Partisan Breakdown, 2016-2018

Affiliation	Members
Democratic Party	24
Republican Party	16
Total	40

== Leadership ==
=== Senate ===
Position	Name	District
President of the Senate	Stephen M. Sweeney	District 3
Majority Leader	Loretta Weinberg	District 37
President pro tempore	Nia Gill; Paul Sarlo	District 34; District 36
Assistant Majority Leaders	James Beach; Linda R. Greenstein; Teresa Ruiz	District 6 District 14; District 29
Majority Conference Leader	Robert M. Gordon	District 38
Majority Whip	Sandra Bolden Cunningham	District 31
Minority Leader	Thomas Kean, Jr.	District 21
Deputy Minority Leader	Diane Allen	District 7
Minority Conference Leader	Robert Singer	District 30
Deputy Minority Conference Leader	Jennifer Beck	District 11
Assistant Republican Leader	Joseph Pennacchio	District 26
Republican Budget Officer	Anthony Bucco	District 25

=== Assembly ===
Speaker: Vincent Prieto

Majority Leader: Louis Greenwald

Minority Leader: Jon Bramnick

== Members ==
=== Senate ===
The Senate has 40 members, one for each district.

District	Name	Party	Residence	First served
District 1	Jeff Van Drew	Dem	Dennis Township	2008
District 2	Colin Bell	Dem	Margate City	2017†
District 3	Stephen M. Sweeney	Dem	West Deptford Township	2002
District 4	Fred H. Madden	Dem	Washington Township (Gloucester)	2004
District 5	Nilsa Cruz-Perez	Dem	Camden	2014†
District 6	James Beach	Dem	Voorhees Township	2009†
District 7	Diane Allen	Rep	Edgewater Park	1998
District 8	Dawn Marie Addiego	Rep	Evesham Township	2010†
District 9	Christopher J. Connors	Rep	Lacey Township	2008
District 10	James W. Holzapfel	Rep	Toms River	2012
District 11	Jennifer Beck	Rep	Red Bank	2008
District 12	Samuel D. Thompson	Rep	Old Bridge Township	2012
District 13	Joe Kyrillos	Rep	Middletown Township	1992
District 14	Linda R. Greenstein	Dem	Plainsboro Township	2010
District 15	Shirley Turner	Dem	Lawrence Township (Mercer)	1998
District 16	Christopher Bateman	Rep	Branchburg Township	2008
District 17	Bob Smith	Dem	Piscataway	2002
District 18	Patrick J. Diegnan	Dem	South Plainfield	2016†
District 19	Joseph Vitale	Dem	Woodbridge Township	1998
District 20	Raymond Lesniak	Dem	Elizabeth	1983
District 21	Thomas Kean, Jr.	Rep	Westfield	2003†
District 22	Nicholas Scutari	Dem	Linden	2004
District 23	Michael J. Doherty	Rep	Washington Township (Warren)	2009
District 24	Steve Oroho	Rep	Franklin	2008
District 25	Anthony Bucco	Rep	Boonton Township	1998
District 26	Joseph Pennacchio	Rep	Montville	2008
District 27	Richard Codey	Dem	Roseland	1982
District 28	Ronald Rice	Dem	Newark	1986
District 29	Teresa Ruiz	Dem	Newark	2008
District 30	Robert Singer	Rep	Lakewood Township	1993†
District 31	Sandra Bolden Cunningham	Dem	Jersey City	2007†
District 32	Nicholas Sacco	Dem	North Bergen	1994
District 33	Brian P. Stack	Dem	Union City	2008
District 34	Nia Gill	Dem	Montclair	2002
District 35	Nellie Pou	Dem	North Haledon	2012
District 36	Paul Sarlo	Dem	Wood-Ridge	2003†
District 37	Loretta Weinberg	Dem	Teaneck	2005†
District 38	Robert M. Gordon	Dem	Fair Lawn	2008
District 39	Gerald Cardinale	Rep	Demarest	1982
District 40	Kristin Corrado	Rep	Totowa	2017†

† First appointed to the seat

==== Former members from this term ====
District	Name	Party	Residence	First served	Term end	Cause
18th	Peter J. Barnes III	Dem	Edison	2014	April 25, 2016	Appointed as a judge to the New Jersey Superior Court
40th	Kevin J. O'Toole	Rep	Cedar Grove	2008^{1}	July 1, 2017	Appointed to the Board of Commissioners of The Port Authority of New York and New Jersey
2nd	Jim Whelan	Dem	Atlantic City	2008	August 22, 2017	Death (heart attack)

^{1} O'Toole had previously served in the Senate from 2001 to 2002

==== Committees and Committee Chairs, 2016-2017 Legislative Session ====
Committee chairs are: (All are Democrats)

Committee	Name
Budget and Appropriations	Paul Sarlo
Commerce	Nia Gill
Community and Urban Affairs	Jeff Van Drew
Economic Growth	Raymond Lesniak
Education	Teresa Ruiz
Environment and Energy	Bob Smith
Health, Human Services and Senior Citizens	Joseph Vitale
Higher Education	Sandra Bolden Cunningham
Judiciary	Nicholas Scutari
Labor	Fred H. Madden
Law and Public Safety	Linda R. Greenstein
Legislative Oversight	Robert M. Gordon
Military and Veterans' Affairs	James Beach
State Government, Wagering, Tourism & Historic Preservation	Jim Whelan
Transportation	Nicholas Sacco

=== Assembly ===
The Assembly has 80 members, two for each district.

District	Name	Party	Residence	First served
District 1	Bob Andrzejczak	Dem	Middle Township	2013 (Note: First appointed to the seat)
District 1	R. Bruce Land	Dem	Vineland	2016
District 2	Chris A. Brown	Rep	Ventnor City	2012
District 2	Vince Mazzeo	Dem	Northfield	2014
District 3	John J. Burzichelli	Dem	Paulsboro	2002
District 3	Adam Taliaferro	Dem	Woolwich Township	2015
District 4	Paul Moriarty	Dem	Washington Township (Gloucester)	2006
District 4	Gabriela Mosquera	Dem	Gloucester Township	2012
District 5	Arthur Barclay	Dem	Camden	2016
District 5	Patricia Egan Jones	Dem	Barrington	2015
District 6	Louis Greenwald	Dem	Voorhees Township	1996
District 6	Pamela Rosen Lampitt	Dem	Cherry Hill	2006
District 7	Herb Conaway	Dem	Delanco Township	1998
District 7	Troy Singleton	Dem	Palmyra	2011
District 8	Joe Howarth	Rep	Evesham Township	2016
District 8	Maria Rodriguez-Gregg	Rep	Evesham Township	2014
District 9	DiAnne Gove	Rep	Long Beach Township	2009
District 9	Brian E. Rumpf	Rep	Little Egg Harbor	2003
District 10	Gregory P. McGuckin	Rep	Toms River	2012
District 10	David W. Wolfe	Rep	Brick Township	1992
District 11	Joann Downey	Dem	Freehold Township	2016
District 11	Eric Houghtaling	Dem	Neptune Township	2016
District 12	Robert D. Clifton	Rep	Matawan	2012
District 12	Ronald S. Dancer	Rep	Plumsted Township	2002
District 13	Amy Handlin	Rep	Middletown Township	2006
District 13	Declan O'Scanlon	Rep	Little Silver	2008
District 14	Daniel R. Benson	Dem	Hamilton Township (Mercer)	2011
District 14	Wayne DeAngelo	Dem	Hamilton Township	2008
District 15	Reed Gusciora	Dem	Trenton	1996
District 15	Elizabeth Maher Muoio	Dem	Pennington	2015
District 16	Jack Ciattarelli	Rep	Hillsborough Township	2011
District 16	Andrew Zwicker	Dem	South Brunswick	2016
District 17	Joseph Danielsen	Dem	Franklin Township (Somerset)	2014
District 17	Joseph V. Egan	Dem	New Brunswick	2002
District 18	Robert Karabinchak	Dem	Edison	2016
District 18	Nancy Pinkin	Dem	East Brunswick	2014
District 19	Craig Coughlin	Dem	Woodbridge Township	2010
District 19	John S. Wisniewski	Dem	Sayreville	1996
District 20	Jamel C. Holley	Dem	Roselle	2015
District 20	Annette Quijano	Dem	Elizabeth	2008
District 21	Jon Bramnick	Rep	Westfield	2003
District 21	Nancy Munoz	Rep	Summit	2009
District 22	Jerry Green	Dem	Plainfield	1992
District 22	James J. Kennedy	Dem	Rahway	2016
District 23	John DiMaio	Rep	Hackettstown	2009
District 23	Erik Peterson	Rep	Franklin Township (Hunterdon)	2009
District 24	Parker Space	Rep	Wantage Township	2013
District 24	Gail Phoebus	Rep	Andover Township	2015
District 25	Tony Bucco	Rep	Boonton Township	2010
District 25	Michael Patrick Carroll	Rep	Morris Township	1996
District 26	BettyLou DeCroce	Rep	Parsippany-Troy Hills	2012
District 26	Jay Webber	Rep	Morris Plains	2008
District 27	Mila Jasey	Dem	South Orange	2007
District 27	John F. McKeon	Dem	West Orange	2002
District 28	Ralph R. Caputo	Dem	Bloomfield	2008 (Note: Served in the Assembly as a Republican from 1968–1972)
District 28	Cleopatra Tucker	Dem	Newark	2008
District 29	Eliana Pintor Marin	Dem	Newark	2013
District 29	Blonnie R. Watson	Dem	Newark	2016
District 30	Sean T. Kean	Rep	Wall Township	2012 (Note: Served in the Assembly from 2002–2008)
District 30	Ned Thomson	Rep	Wall Township	2017
District 31	Nicholas Chiaravalloti	Dem	Bayonne	2016
District 31	Angela V. McKnight	Dem	Jersey City	2016
District 32	Angelica M. Jimenez	Dem	West New York	2012
District 32	Vincent Prieto	Dem	Secaucus	2004
District 33	Annette Chaparro	Dem	Hoboken	2016
District 33	Raj Mukherji	Dem	Jersey City	2014
District 34	Thomas P. Giblin	Dem	Montclair	2006
District 34	Sheila Y. Oliver	Dem	East Orange	2004
District 35	Shavonda E. Sumter	Dem	Paterson	2012
District 35	Benjie Wimberly	Dem	Paterson	2012
District 36	Marlene Caride	Dem	Ridgefield	2012
District 36	Gary Schaer	Dem	Passaic	2006
District 37	Valerie Huttle	Dem	Englewood	2006
District 37	Gordon M. Johnson	Dem	Englewood	2002
District 38	Tim Eustace	Dem	Maywood	2012
District 38	Joseph Lagana	Dem	Paramus	2014
District 39	Holly Schepisi	Rep	River Vale	2012
District 39	Robert Auth	Rep	Old Tappan	2010
District 40	David C. Russo	Rep	Ridgewood	1990
District 40	Kevin J. Rooney	Rep	Wyckoff	2016

==== Former members from this term ====
District	Name	Party	Residence	First served	Left office	Cause
18th	Patrick J. Diegnan	Dem	South Plainfield	2002	May 9, 2016	Appointed to the District's Senate seat
29th	L. Grace Spencer	Dem	Newark	2008	June 30, 2016	Appointed as a judge to the New Jersey Superior Court
40th	Scott Rumana	Rep	Wayne	2008	October 20, 2016	Appointed as a judge to the New Jersey Superior Court
30th	Dave Rible	Rep	Wall Township	2008	July 17, 2017	Appointed Director of the New Jersey Division of Alcoholic Beverage Control

== Vacancies ==
=== Senate ===
District	Original	Party	Period of vacancy	Appointee	Party of Appointee
18th	Peter J. Barnes III	Democratic Party	April 25, 2016 – May 9, 2016	Patrick J. Diegnan	Democratic Party
40th	Kevin J. O'Toole	Republican Party	July 1, 2017 – October 5, 2017	Kristin Corrado	Republican Party
2nd	Jim Whelan	Democratic Party	August 22, 2017 – October 5, 2017	Colin Bell	Democratic Party

=== Assembly ===
District	Original	Party	Period of vacancy	Appointee	Party of Appointee
18th	Patrick J. Diegnan	Democratic Party	May 9, 2016 – May 26, 2016	Robert Karabinchak	Democratic Party
29th	L. Grace Spencer	Democratic Party	June 30, 2016 – July 21, 2016	Blonnie R. Watson	Democratic Party
40th	Scott Rumana	Republican Party	October 20, 2016-???	Kevin J. Rooney	Republican Party
30th	Dave Rible	Republican Party	July 17, 2017 – August 24, 2017	Ned Thomson	Republican Party

== See also ==
- List of New Jersey state legislatures
