= 216th New Jersey Legislature =

2014 to 2015 legislative session

←	215th Legislature	217th Legislature	→
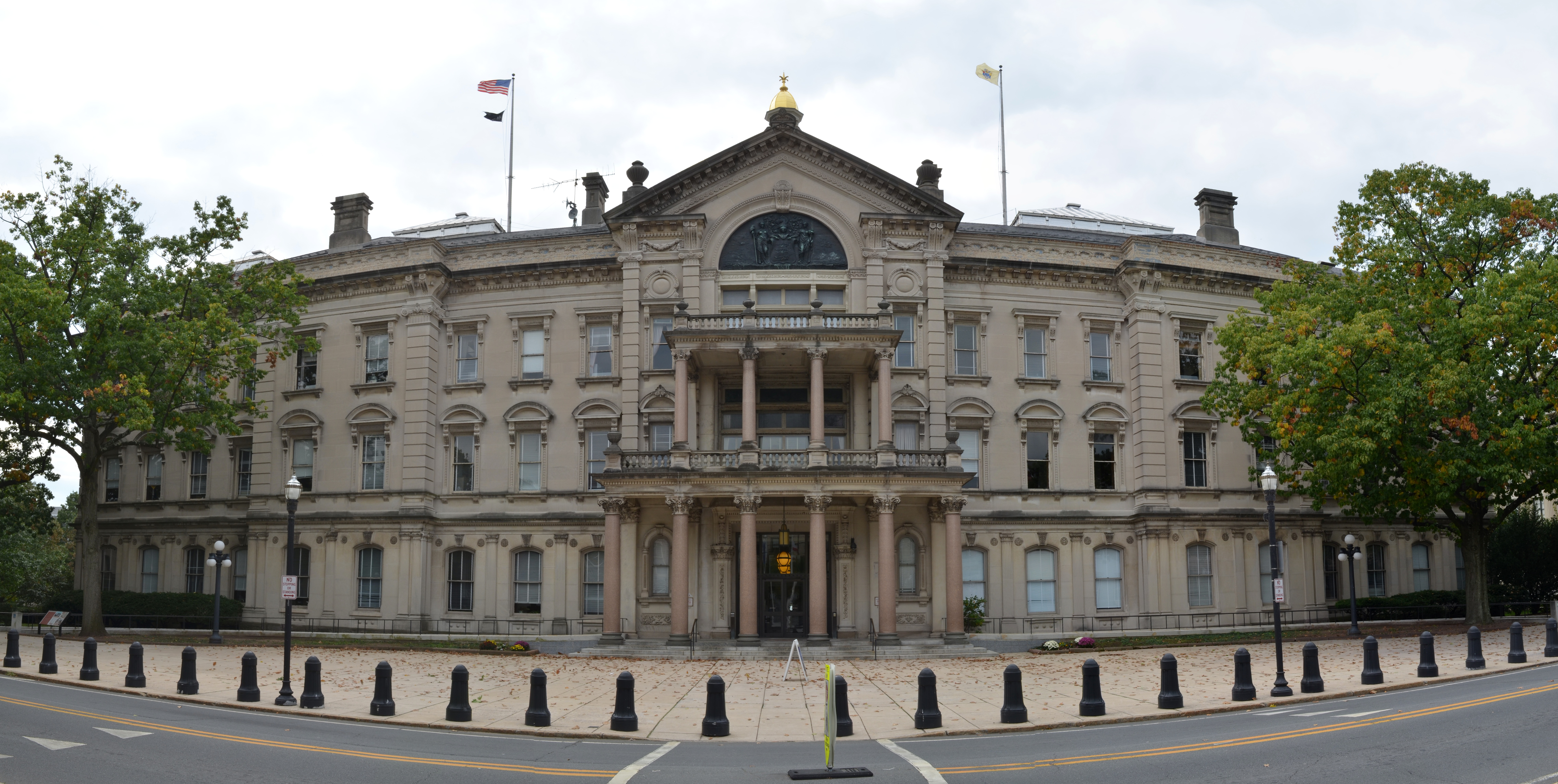
- New Jersey State House north panorama, 2012

Overview
- Legislative body: New Jersey Legislature
- Jurisdiction: New Jersey, United States
- Term: January 14, 2014 – January 12, 2016

New Jersey Senate
- Members: 40
- President: Stephen M. Sweeney
- Minority Leader: Thomas Kean Jr.
- Party control: Democratic Party

New Jersey General Assembly
- Members: 80
- Speaker: Vincent Prieto
- Minority Leader: Jon Bramnick
- Party control: Democratic Party

The 216th New Jersey Legislature began on January 14, 2014, at the end of Chris Christie's first term as Governor of New Jersey, and ended on January 12, 2016, halfway through Chris Christie's second term as governor.

== Background ==
The elections for the 216th Legislature were held on November 5, 2013, alongside Chris Christie's landslide re-election. In the Assembly the composition didn't change while in the Senate the composition did not change either.

== Composition ==
=== Assembly ===
New Jersey General Assembly composition, 2014-2016

Affiliation	Members
Democratic Party	48
Republican Party	32
Total	80

=== Senate ===
NJ State Senate composition 2012

Affiliation	Members
Democratic Party	24
Republican Party	16
Total	40

== Senate ==
The Senate has 40 members, one for each district

=== Leadership ===
The leadership for the 216th legislative session, which started on January 14, 2014, is as follows:

Position	Name	District
President of the Senate	Stephen M. Sweeney	District 3
Majority Leader	Loretta Weinberg	District 37
President pro tempore	Nia Gill; Paul Sarlo	District 34; District 36
Assistant Majority Leaders	James Beach; Linda R. Greenstein; Teresa Ruiz	District 6 District 14; District 29
Majority Conference Leader	Robert M. Gordon	District 38
Majority Whip	Sandra Bolden Cunningham	District 31
Minority Leader	Thomas Kean, Jr.	District 21
Deputy Minority Leader	Diane Allen	District 7
Minority Conference Leader	Robert Singer	District 30
Deputy Minority Conference Leader	Jennifer Beck	District 11
Assistant Republican Leader	Joseph Pennacchio	District 40
Republican Budget Officer	Anthony Bucco	District 25

=== Senators ===
District	Name	Party	Residence	First served
District 1	Jeff Van Drew	Dem	Dennis Township	2008
District 2	Jim Whelan	Dem	Atlantic City	2008
District 3	Stephen M. Sweeney	Dem	West Deptford Township	2002
District 4	Fred H. Madden	Dem	Washington Township (Gloucester)	2004
District 5	Nilsa Cruz-Perez	Dem	Camden	2014†
District 6	James Beach	Dem	Voorhees Township	2009†
District 7	Diane Allen	Rep	Edgewater Park	1998
District 8	Dawn Marie Addiego	Rep	Evesham Township	2010†
District 9	Christopher J. Connors	Rep	Lacey Township	2008
District 10	James W. Holzapfel	Rep	Toms River	2012
District 11	Jennifer Beck	Rep	Red Bank	2008
District 12	Samuel D. Thompson	Rep	Old Bridge Township	2012
District 13	Joe Kyrillos	Rep	Middletown Township	1992
District 14	Linda R. Greenstein	Dem	Plainsboro Township	2010
District 15	Shirley Turner	Dem	Lawrence Township (Mercer)	1998
District 16	Christopher Bateman	Rep	Branchburg Township	2008
District 17	Bob Smith	Dem	Piscataway	2002
District 18	Peter J. Barnes III	Dem	Edison	2014
District 19	Joseph Vitale	Dem	Woodbridge Township	1998
District 20	Raymond Lesniak	Dem	Elizabeth	1983
District 21	Thomas Kean, Jr.	Rep	Westfield	2003†
District 22	Nicholas Scutari	Dem	Linden	2004
District 23	Michael J. Doherty	Rep	Oxford Township	2009
District 24	Steve Oroho	Rep	Franklin	2008
District 25	Anthony Bucco	Rep	Boonton Township	1998
District 26	Joseph Pennacchio	Rep	Montville	2008
District 27	Richard Codey	Dem	Roseland	1982
District 28	Ronald Rice	Dem	Newark	1986
District 29	Teresa Ruiz	Dem	Newark	2008
District 30	Robert Singer	Rep	Lakewood Township	1994
District 31	Sandra Bolden Cunningham	Dem	Jersey City	2007†
District 32	Nicholas Sacco	Dem	North Bergen	1994
District 33	Brian P. Stack	Dem	Union City	2008
District 34	Nia Gill	Dem	Montclair	2002
District 35	Nellie Pou	Dem	Paterson	2012
District 36	Paul Sarlo	Dem	Wood-Ridge	2003†
District 37	Loretta Weinberg	Dem	Teaneck	2005†
District 38	Robert M. Gordon	Dem	Fair Lawn	2008
District 39	Gerald Cardinale	Rep	Demarest	1982
District 40	Kevin J. O'Toole	Rep	Cedar Grove	2008^{1}

† First appointed to the seat
^{1} O'Toole had previously served in the Senate from 2001 to 2002

=== Former members from this term ===
District	Name	Party	Residence	First served	Term end	Notes
District 5	Donald Norcross	Dem	Camden	2010†	November 12, 2014	Elected to the U.S. House of Representatives

=== Committees and Committee Chairs, 2014-2015 Legislative Session ===
Committee chairs As of March 1, 2015: (All are Democrats)

Committee	Name
Budget and Appropriations	Paul Sarlo
Commerce	Nia Gill
Community and Urban Affairs	Jeff Van Drew
Economic Growth	Raymond Lesniak
Education	Teresa Ruiz
Environment and Energy	Bob Smith
Health, Human Services and Senior Citizens	Joseph Vitale
Higher Education	Sandra Bolden Cunningham
Judiciary	Nicholas Scutari
Labor	Fred H. Madden
Law and Public Safety	Linda R. Greenstein
Legislative Oversight	Robert M. Gordon
Military and Veterans' Affairs	James Beach
State Government, Wagering, Tourism & Historic Preservation	Jim Whelan
Transportation	Nicholas Sacco

== Assembly ==
The Assembly has 80 members, two for each district.

=== Leadership ===
Speaker: Vincent Prieto

Majority Leader: Louis Greenwald

Minority Leader: Jon Bramnick

=== Members ===
District	Name	Party	Residence	First served
District 1	Robert Andrzejczak	Dem	Middle Township	2013 (Note: First appointed to the seat)
District 1	Sam Fiocchi	Rep	Vineland	2014
District 2	Chris A. Brown	Rep	Ventnor City	2012
District 2	Vince Mazzeo	Rep	Northfield	2014
District 3	John J. Burzichelli	Dem	Paulsboro	2002
District 3	Adam Taliaferro	Dem	Woolwich Township	2015
District 4	Paul Moriarty	Dem	Washington Township (Gloucester)	2006
District 4	Gabriela Mosquera	Dem	Gloucester Township	2012
District 5	Patricia Egan Jones	Dem	Barrington	2015
District 5	Seat vacant			
District 6	Louis Greenwald	Dem	Voorhees Township	1996
District 6	Pamela Rosen Lampitt	Dem	Cherry Hill	2006
District 7	Herb Conaway	Dem	Delanco Township	1998
District 7	Troy Singleton	Dem	Palmyra	2011
District 8	Christopher J. Brown	Rep	Evesham Township	2012
District 8	Maria Rodriguez-Gregg	Rep	Evesham Township	2014
District 9	DiAnne Gove	Rep	Long Beach Township	2009
District 9	Brian E. Rumpf	Rep	Little Egg Harbor	2003
District 10	Gregory P. McGuckin	Rep	Toms River	2012
District 10	David W. Wolfe	Rep	Brick Township	1992
District 11	Mary Pat Angelini	Rep	Ocean Township (Monmouth)	2008
District 11	Caroline Casagrande	Rep	Colts Neck Township	2008
District 12	Robert D. Clifton	Rep	Matawan	2012
District 12	Ronald S. Dancer	Rep	Plumsted Township	2002
District 13	Amy Handlin	Rep	Lincroft	2006
District 13	Declan O'Scanlon	Rep	Little Silver	2008
District 14	Daniel R. Benson	Dem	Hamilton Township (Mercer)	2011
District 14	Wayne DeAngelo	Dem	Hamilton Township	2008
District 15	Reed Gusciora	Dem	Trenton	1996
District 15	Elizabeth Maher Muoio	Dem	Pennington	2015
District 16	Jack Ciattarelli	Rep	Hillsborough Township	2011
District 16	Donna Simon	Rep	Readington Township	2012
District 17	Joseph Danielsen	Dem	Franklin Township (Somerset)	2014
District 17	Joseph V. Egan	Dem	New Brunswick	2002
District 18	Patrick J. Diegnan	Dem	South Plainfield	2002
District 18	Nancy Pinkin	Dem	East Brunswick	2014
District 19	Craig Coughlin	Dem	Woodbridge Township	2010
District 19	John S. Wisniewski	Dem	Sayreville	1996
District 20	Annette Quijano	Dem	Elizabeth	2008
District 20	Jamel C. Holley	Dem	Roselle	2015
District 21	Jon Bramnick	Rep	Westfield	2003
District 21	Nancy Munoz	Rep	Summit	2009
District 22	Jerry Green	Dem	Plainfield	1992
District 22	Linda Stender	Dem	Scotch Plains	2002
District 23	John DiMaio	Rep	Hackettstown	2009
District 23	Erik Peterson	Rep	Franklin Township (Hunterdon)	2009
District 24	Parker Space	Rep	Wantage Township	2013
District 24	Gail Phoebus	Rep	Andover Township	2015
District 25	Tony Bucco	Rep	Boonton Township	2010
District 25	Michael Patrick Carroll	Rep	Morris Township	1996
District 26	BettyLou DeCroce	Rep	Morris Plains	2012
District 26	Jay Webber	Rep	Morris Plains	2008
District 27	Mila Jasey	Dem	South Orange	2007
District 27	John F. McKeon	Dem	West Orange	2002
District 28	Ralph R. Caputo	Dem	Bloomfield	2008 (Note: Served in the Assembly as a Republican from 1968–1972)
District 28	Cleopatra Tucker	Dem	Newark	2008
District 29	Eliana Pintor-Marin	Dem	Newark	2013
District 29	L. Grace Spencer	Dem	Newark	2008
District 30	Sean T. Kean	Rep	Wall Township	2012 (Note: Served in the Assembly from 2002–2008)
District 30	Dave Rible	Rep	Wall Township	2008
District 31	Charles Mainor	Dem	Jersey City	2010
District 31	Jason O'Donnell	Dem	Bayonne	2010
District 32	Angelica M. Jimenez	Dem	West New York	2012
District 32	Vincent Prieto	Dem	Secaucus	2004
District 33	Carmelo Garcia	Dem	Hoboken	2014
District 33	Raj Mukherji	Dem	Jersey City	2014
District 34	Thomas P. Giblin	Dem	Montclair	2006
District 34	Sheila Y. Oliver	Dem	East Orange	2004
District 35	Shavonda E. Sumter	Dem	Paterson	2012
District 35	Benjie Wimberly	Dem	Paterson	2012
District 36	Marlene Caride	Dem	Ridgefield	2012
District 36	Gary Schaer	Dem	Passaic	2006
District 37	Valerie Huttle	Dem	Englewood	2006
District 37	Gordon M. Johnson	Dem	Englewood	2002
District 38	Tim Eustace	Dem	Maywood	2012
District 38	Joseph Lagana	Dem	Paramus	2014
District 39	Holly Schepisi	Rep	River Vale	2012
District 39	Robert Auth	Rep	Old Tappan	2010
District 40	Scott Rumana	Rep	Wayne	2008
District 40	David C. Russo	Rep	Ridgewood	1990

=== Former members from this term ===
District	Name	Party	Residence	First served	Term end	Notes
District 17	Upendra J. Chivukula	Dem	Franklin Township (Somerset)	2002	September 30, 2014	Appointed to the New Jersey Board of Public Utilities
District 3	Celeste Riley	Dem	Bridgeton	2009	January 2, 2015	Elected Cumberland County Clerk
District 20	Joseph Cryan	Dem	Union Township (Union)	2002	January 4, 2015	Elected Union County Sheriff
District 15	Bonnie Watson Coleman	Dem	Ewing Township	1998	January 6, 2015	Elected to the U.S. House of Representatives
District 5	Angel Fuentes	Dem	Camden	2010	June 30, 2015	Appointed deputy clerk for Camden County
District 24	Alison Littell McHose	Rep	Franklin	2003	October 17, 2015	Resigned to focus on job as Franklin borough business administrator
District 5	Gilbert "Whip" Wilson	Dem	Camden	2010	December 2, 2015	Resigned to become Camden County Sheriff

== Vacancies ==
=== Senate ===
District	Original	Party	Period of vacancy	Appointee	Party of Appointee
5th	Donald Norcross	Democratic Party	November 12, 2014 – December 15, 2014	Nilsa Cruz-Perez	Democratic Party

=== Assembly ===
District	Original	Party	Period of vacancy	Appointee	Party of Appointee
17th	Upendra J. Chivukula	Democratic Party	September 30, 2014 – October 16, 2014	Joseph Danielsen	Democratic Party
3rd	Celeste Riley	Democratic Party	January 1, 2015 – January 15, 2015	Adam Taliaferro	Democratic Party
20th	Joseph Cryan	Democratic Party	January 4, 2015 – January 29, 2015	Jamel Holley	Democratic Party
15th	Bonnie Watson Coleman	Democratic Party	January 3, 2015 – February 5, 2015	Elizabeth Maher Muoio	Democratic Party
5th	Angel Fuentes	Democratic Party	June 30, 2015 – November 9, 2015	Patricia Egan Jones	Democratic Party
24th	Alison Littell McHose	Republican Party	October 17, 2015 – December 3, 2015	Gail Phoebus	Republican Party
5th	Gilbert "Whip" Wilson	Democratic Party	December 2, 2015 – January 12, 2016	Successor not seated in session	None

== See also ==
- List of New Jersey state legislatures
