= Mount Aloysius College =

Catholic, liberal-arts college in Cresson, Pennsylvania, US

Coordinates: 40.459519°N 78.601577°W

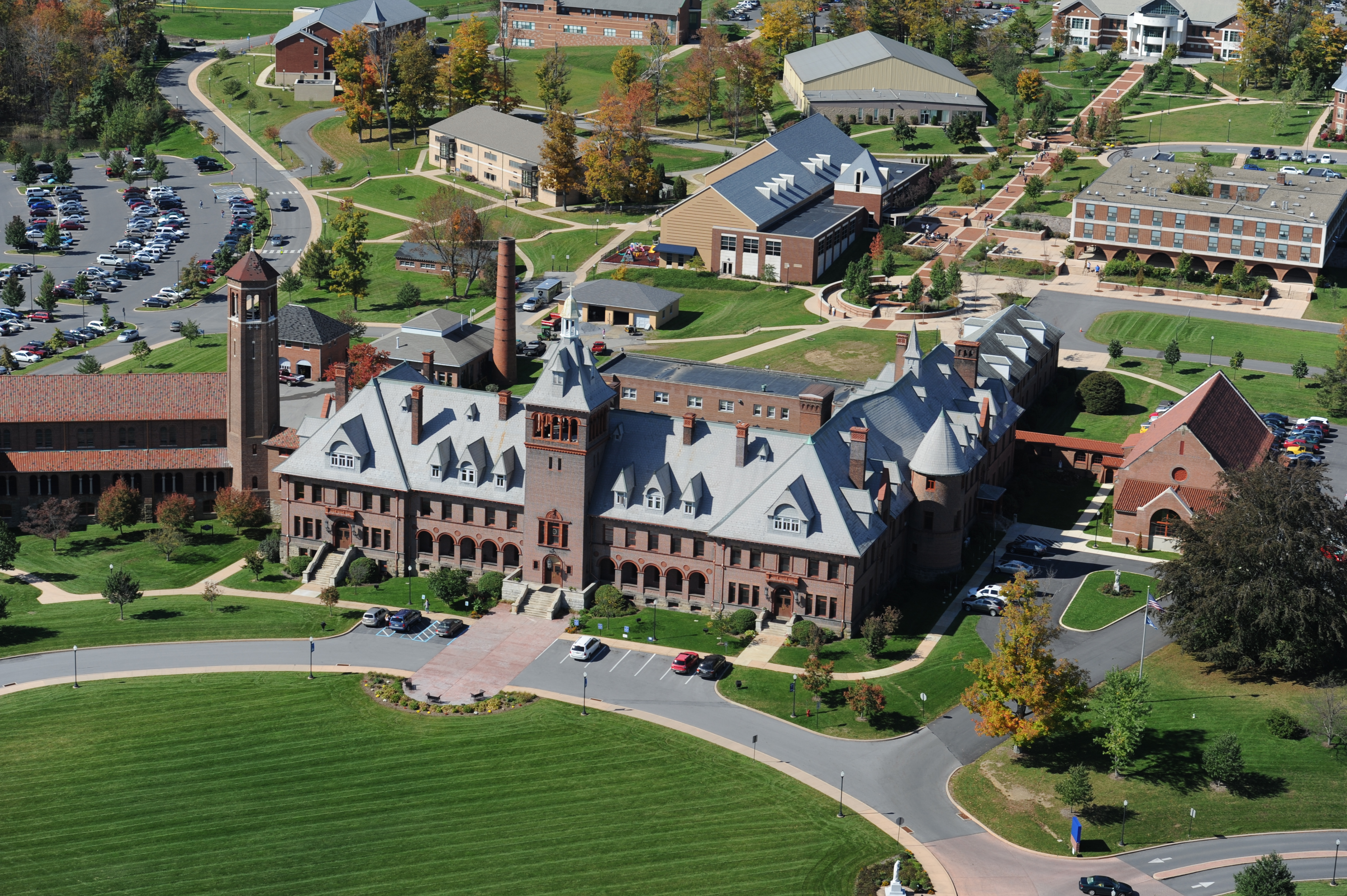
- Aerial view of the campus
- Former names: St. Aloysius Academy (1853–1939); Mount Aloysius Junior College (1939–1991)
- Type: Private
- Established: 1853; 173 years ago
- Religious affiliation: Roman Catholic (Sisters of Mercy)
- Endowment: $71.8 million (2025)
- President: John N. McKeegan
- Students: 2,955 (fall 2024)
- Undergraduates: 2,942 (fall 2024)
- Postgraduates: 13 (fall 2024)
- Location: Cresson, Pennsylvania address, U.S.
- Campus: 193 acres (78 ha); Rural
- Colors: Blue and grey
- Nickname: Mounties
- Sporting affiliations: Allegheny Mountain Collegiate Conference (AMCC)
- Mascot: Mac the Mountie
- Website: mtaloy.edu

Mount Aloysius College is a private Catholic liberal-arts college in Cresson Township, Pennsylvania, United States. It was founded in 1853 and is conducted under the tradition of the Sisters of Mercy. The college is located on a 193 acres (78 ha) campus in the Allegheny Mountains.

== History ==
Mount Aloysius College was founded in 1853 by a small community of sisters from the Sisters of Mercy. During that time, "St. Aloysius Academy" was constructed in a tinner's shop in Loretto, PA. In 1897, the academy moved to its present location in Cresson. Through an initiative of Sister Mary de Sales Farley, R.S.M., the academy became "Mount Aloysius Junior College" in 1939. Then, in 1991, the college expanded and amended its charter to allow the conferment of bachelor's degrees; this change resulted in the school adopting its current name, "Mount Aloysius College." In 2000, the college's charter was amended again to include master's degrees.

== Academics ==
Mount Aloysius College is a liberal arts college that awards associate, bachelor's, and master's degrees in the arts and sciences fields. The undergraduate enrollment totals approximately 1,000 students. There are approximately 40 undergraduate and graduate programs for students to choose from at the college. The college has an 11:1 student-to-faculty ratio and an average class size of 14.

== Campus ==
The college is in the Allegheny Mountains region of west-central Pennsylvania. The campus covers 194 acres of mountain land.

=== Academic and administrative buildings ===
- Administration Building - "Main" was constructed in 1890 and is home to many classrooms, faculty offices, and the college's administrative offices. Several programs, such as Nursing and History, Politics, and Geographic Analysis (HPGA), are housed here. The Mount Aloysius College Wolf-Kuhn Gallery and the Health Services, Counseling, and Disability Services can be found here.
- Academic Hall - Academic is the home of the college's Psychology, Religious Studies, Education, and American Sign Language/English Interpreting. The ASL/EI department's interactive labs and customized classrooms are here.
- Pierce Hall/The Learning Center for Health Science and Technology - Pierce's renovations were completed in 2018. The building now offers medical simulation labs, meeting rooms, and study areas.

=== Residential buildings ===
- Ihmsen Hall - This traditionally freshman residence hall houses approximately 200 male and female students in double rooms, with two rooms sharing a bathroom.
- McAuley Hall - The newest residence hall, McAuley houses 102 male and female students in double rooms with shared bathrooms between rooms. McAuley also has several large meeting rooms and study rooms.
- Misciagna Hall - Each room in this apartment-style residence hall features a small kitchenette, two bedrooms, a bathroom, and a common area.
- Saint Gertrude's Hall - "St. Gert's" is a traditionally freshman residence hall featuring limited single rooms and community-style bathrooms.
- Saint Joseph's Hall - "St. Joe's" is a traditionally freshman residence hall with larger, quad rooms and community-style bathrooms.

=== Student life ===
- Cosgrave Student Center - Named after Mother Mary Gertrude Cosgrave, one of the college's founders, Cosgrave is the center of campus and student life. It includes the college bookstore, an on-campus daycare center, dining facilities, campus police, student activities offices, study areas, and meeting rooms.
- Bertschi Center & Technology Commons - An excellent place for commuters to hang out and study. Students can hang out in the self-serve cafe and study lounge. The multipurpose room located at the back of the building is used for banquets, ceremonies, and various other on-campus events.
- Alumni Hall - Built in 1904, Alumni Hall is one of the oldest buildings on campus. It is home to the college's theatre, which doubles as a large lecture hall. The building is also used for admissions and other student events.
- Library - The library hosts the college's learning commons, a place for students to study, practice presentations, get help from peer and professional tutors, and attend academic workshops. The library also has classrooms on the ground floor and in the basement.
- Our Lady of Mercy Chapel - Built in 1922, the chapel hosts mass regularly for students and community members.

== Athletics ==
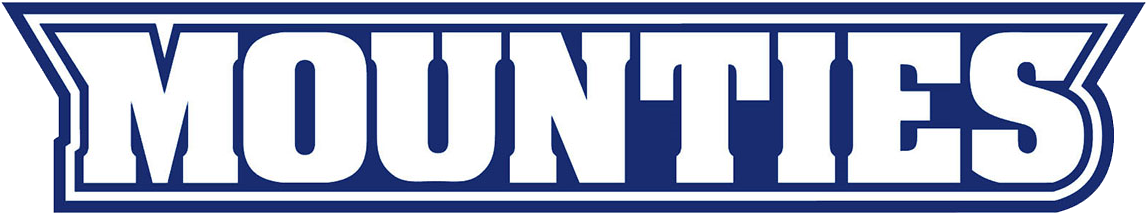
Mount Aloysius athletics wordmark

Mount Aloysius College's athletic teams are called the Mounties and include 18 college-sponsored varsity teams in the National Collegiate Athletic Association (NCAA) Division III in the Allegheny Mountain Collegiate Conference.

=== Varsity sports ===
Men's sports	Women's sports
Baseball	Basketball
Basketball	Bowling
Cross country	Cross country
Golf	Golf
Rifle	Lacrosse
Soccer	Rifle
Tennis	Soccer
Volleyball	Softball
	Tennis
	Volleyball

=== Athletic facilities ===
- Athletic Convocation and Wellness Center - This 84,000 square foot building comfortably seats 2,500 people. The building includes main and auxiliary gyms, a wellness center, an athletes-only weight room, classrooms, indoor batting cages, soccer equipment, and offices.
- Ray and Louise Walker Athletic Field Complex - This complex includes the Calandra-Smith Baseball Field, as well as the college's softball field, soccer/lacrosse field, and tennis courts, as well as the Mountie Stables, which houses the college's press box and home and away locker rooms, and plenty of seating for fans.
  - Soccer & Lacrosse Field - The Mountie field was upgraded in the summer of 2018 with a new artificial turf surface, lighting for night practices and games, and stadium seating.
  - Calandra-Smith Baseball Field - The Calandra-Smith Baseball Field features a turfed infield, dugouts, an electronic scoreboard, and plenty of seating for fans.
  - Tennis Courts - The four courts are Mountie Blue and a great area for practice and games.
  - Softball Field - Located adjacent to the Mountie Stables, the softball field is home to the Mount's women's softball team.

== Notable alumni ==
- Patricia Egan Jones, politician who represented the 5th Legislative District in the New Jersey General Assembly from 2015 to 2020
- Renée Martin-Nagle, internationally recognized freshwater expert. Secretary General of the International Water Resources Association. Founder and CEO of A Ripple Effect.
