= Bill Moen =

American politician (born 1986)

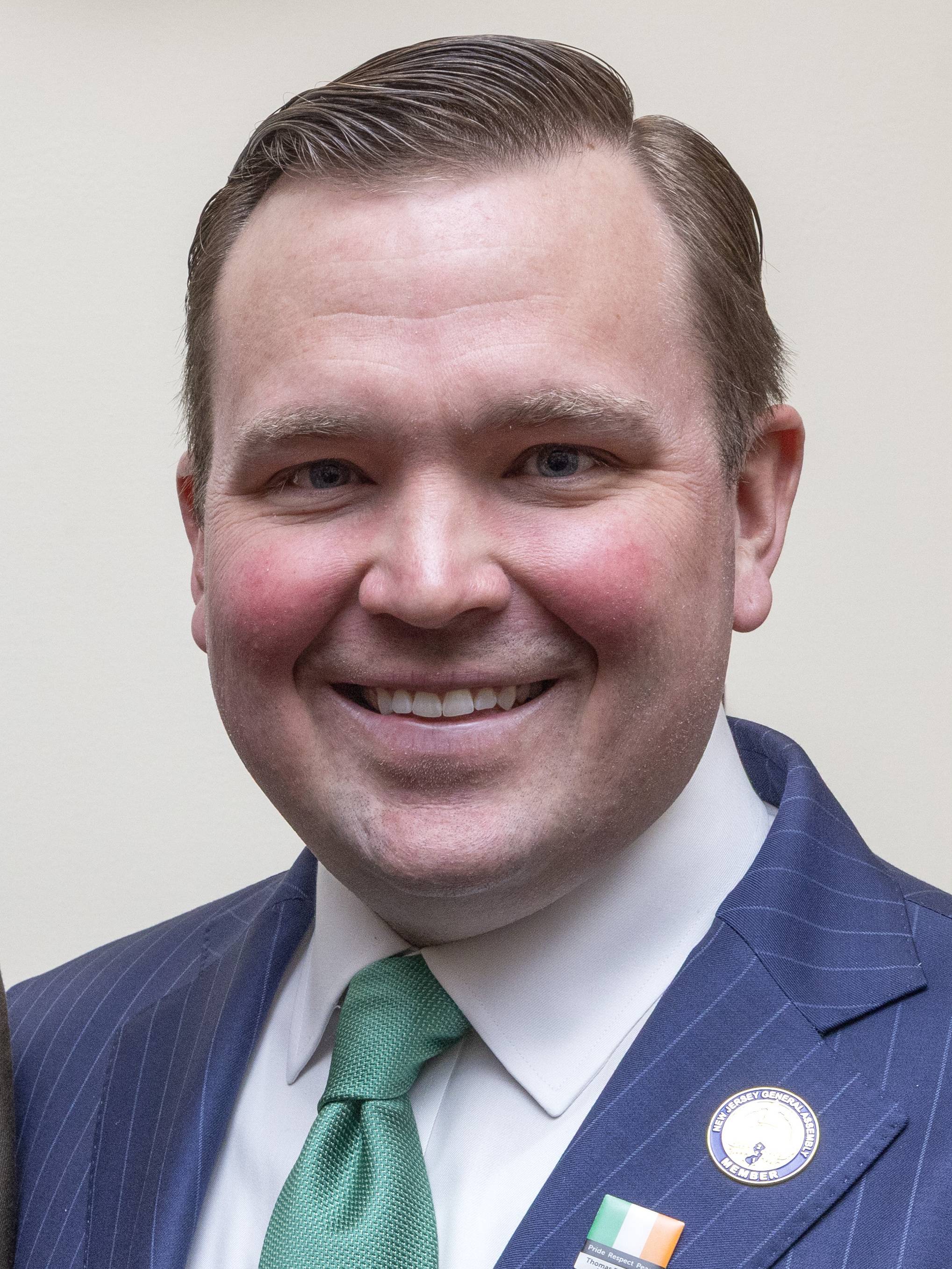
- Moen in 2025

Member of the New Jersey General Assembly from the 5th district
- Incumbent
- Assumed office January 14, 2020 Serving with William Spearman
- Preceded by: Patricia Egan Jones

Member of the Camden County, New Jersey Board of Chosen Freeholders
- In office 2016–2019

Personal details
- Born: November 14, 1986 (age 39)
- Party: Democratic
- Education: Rowan University (B.A.); University of Pennsylvania (M.P.A.)
- Website: Legislative Webpage

William F. Moen Jr. (born November 14, 1986) is an American Democratic Party politician from Camden, who has represented the 5th Legislative District in the New Jersey General Assembly since taking office on January 14, 2020, at which time he was the state's youngest legislator in the Assembly.

== New Jersey Assembly ==
Before taking office in the Assembly, Moen served on the Camden County Board of Chosen Freeholders from 2016 to 2019, where he was one of the youngest people elected to serve as freeholder. Moen resigned from his position as freeholder in March 2019 in order to focus on his run for Assembly and was replaced by Melinda Kane.

== Personal life ==
Raised in Runnemede, Moen later moved to Camden and currently lives in Bellmawr. He is of Irish decent.

Moen is a 2005 graduate of Triton Regional High School. He earned his BA from Rowan University and his MPA from University of Pennsylvania.

=== District 5 ===
Each of the 40 districts in the New Jersey Legislature has one representative in the New Jersey Senate and two members in the New Jersey General Assembly. The representatives from the 5th District for the 2026—2027 Legislative Session are:

- Senator Nilsa Cruz-Perez (D)
- Assemblyman Bill Moen (D) , and
- Assemblyman William Spearman (D)

== Electoral history ==
=== Assembly ===
5th Legislative District General Election, 2023
Party	Candidate	Votes	%
Democratic	William W. Spearman (incumbent)	25,994	35.1
Democratic	William F. Moen Jr. (incumbent)	25,757	34.7
Republican	Joe Miller	11,386	15.4
Republican	Yalinda Pagan	11,048	14.9
Total votes		74,135	100.0
Democratic hold			

5th legislative district general election, 2021
Party	Candidate	Votes	%
Democratic	William F. Moen Jr. (incumbent)	30,442	28.74%
Democratic	William W. Spearman (incumbent)	30,059	28.38%
Republican	Samuel DiMatteo	23,007	21.72%
Republican	Sean Sepsey	22,413	21.16%
Total votes		105,921	100.0
Democratic hold			

New Jersey General Assembly Elections 2019, District 5
Party	Candidate	Votes	%	±%
Democratic	William Spearman (incumbent)	21,533	33.95%	
Democratic	William Moen, Jr.	20,743	32.7%	
Republican	Nicholas Kush	10,711	16.89%	
Republican	Kevin Ehret	10,442	16.46%	
Total votes		63,429	100%	
Democratic hold				
