= Gilbert "Whip" Wilson =

Sheriff of Camden County, New Jersey, US

Sheriff of Camden County, New Jersey
- Incumbent
- Assumed office December 3, 2015
- Preceded by: Charles H. Billingham

Member of the New Jersey General Assembly from the 5th district
- In office January 25, 2010 – December 2, 2015
- Preceded by: Donald Norcross
- Succeeded by: Arthur Barclay

Personal details
- Born: Gilbert L. Wilson; March 17, 1947 (age 79) Camden, New Jersey, U.S.
- Spouse: Martha
- Education: Camden County College; Rowan University

Military service
- Allegiance: United States
- Branch/service: United States Air Force
- Years of service: 1965–1969
- Rank: Sergeant
- Battles/wars: Vietnam War

Gilbert L. "Whip" Wilson (born March 17, 1947) is an American Democratic Party politician who has been the sheriff of Camden County, New Jersey since December 2015. He served in the New Jersey General Assembly from 2010. when he was selected by party leaders to fill the vacant seat of Donald Norcross who had moved up to the New Jersey Senate, until December 2015 when he resigned in order to take office as sheriff . While in the Assembly, he represented the 5th Legislative District. Wilson was a councilman at-large in the City of Camden from 1997 to 2000 and again from 2005 to 2010.

== Biography ==
Wilson was born and raised in Camden, graduating from Camden High School in 1965. He served in the United States Air Force from 1965 to 1969, in a tour of duty including San Antonio, Texas, Little Rock, Arkansas, Thailand and Vietnam. He received the Air Force Commendation Medal, the Air Force Good Conduct Medal, the National Defense Service Medal, and the Vietnam Service Medal.

Wilson joined the Camden Police Department after his discharge from the Air Force. While a police officer, he attended Camden County College and Glassboro State College (now Rowan University), graduating with a bachelor's degree in law and criminal justice. He served in the Police Department for more than 26 years, retiring as a lieutenant. He was the Commander of the Vice Unit and Supervisor of the First Community Policing Unit.

Wilson was elected Councilman-at-Large of the Camden City Council in May 1997, serving until July 2001. He returned to the City Council in July 2005. On January 17, 2010, when Assemblyman Donald Norcross was selected by Camden County and Gloucester County Democrats to replace Dana Redd in the New Jersey Senate, Wilson was selected to fill the vacancy left by Norcross. He was sworn into office on January 25, 2010.

While serving in the Assembly, his 5th District running mates included Senators Norcross until November 4, 2014, and Nilsa Cruz-Perez since December 15, 2014 and Assemblymembers Angel Fuentes from Wilson's entrance until Fuentes' resignation in June 2015 and Patricia Egan Jones for the last month of Wilson's Assembly term. In the 2014–2015 Assembly session, he was the vice-chair of the Agriculture and Natural Resources Committee and the Law and Public Safety Committee in addition to serving on the Military and Veterans' Affairs Committee.

After being elected to complete the unexpired term in a 2010 special election and two successful subsequent re-election bids for full terms, Wilson announced his intention to seek the office of Camden County Sheriff in 2015 and retire from the Assembly. After he won the November general election for sheriff, Wilson resigned his Assembly seat on December 2, 2015, due to a 1971 law that requires the sheriff-elect to be sworn in within 30 days of the election and a law that bans dual officeholding in New Jersey.

New Jersey General Assembly
Preceded by Donald Norcross	Member of the New Jersey General Assembly for the 5th District; January 25, 2010 – December 2, 2015; With: Angel Fuentes, Patricia Egan Jones	Succeeded by Arthur Barclay
Political offices
Preceded by Charles H. Billingham	Camden County Sheriff; December 3, 2015 – present	Succeeded by Incumbent
