= William Spearman =

Member of the New Jersey General Assembly

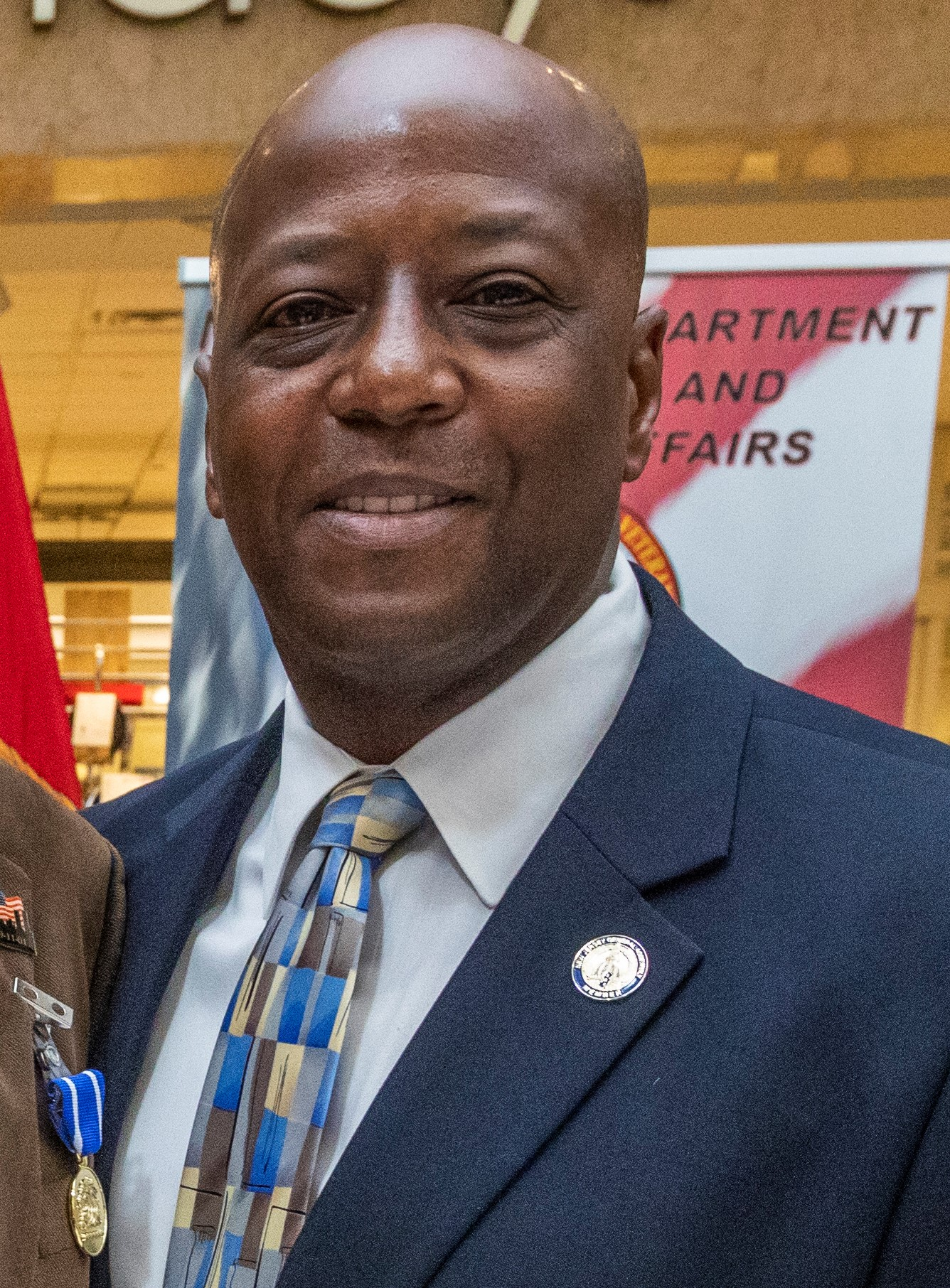

Member of the New Jersey General Assembly from the 5th district
- Incumbent
- Assumed office June 30, 2018 Serving with Patricia Egan Jones; Bill Moen
- Preceded by: Arthur Barclay

Member of the Camden, New Jersey City Council
- In office January 1, 1994 – December 31, 2011

Personal details
- Born: February 27, 1958 (age 68)
- Party: Democratic
- Education: Rutgers University (BS); Temple University (MBA)
- Website: Legislative Webpage

William W. Spearman (born February 27, 1958) is an American Democratic Party politician from Camden, who has represented the 5th Legislative District in the New Jersey General Assembly since taking office on June 30, 2018.

== Early life ==
Raised in Camden, New Jersey, Spearman graduated from Woodrow Wilson High School (since renamed as Eastside High School) and Rutgers University before attending Temple University, where he earned an M.B.A.

== New Jersey Assembly ==
Before taking office in the Assembly in June 2018, Spearman had served on the Camden city council from 2006 to 2011 and had been employed for a decade with the South Jersey Transportation Authority, serving for five years as the agency's ethics liaison officer. He was chosen by the county Democratic Party committee on June 27, 2018 to succeed Arthur Barclay, who had resigned from office earlier that month after being arrested for assault.

=== Committees ===
Committee assignments for the current session are:

- Law and Public Safety, Chair
- Agriculture and Food Security, Vice-chair
- Special Committee on Infrastructure and Natural Resources
- Transportation and Independent Authorities

=== District 5 ===
Each of the 40 districts in the New Jersey Legislature has one representative in the New Jersey Senate and two members in the New Jersey General Assembly. The representatives from the 5th District for the 2024—2025 Legislative Session are:

- Senator Nilsa Cruz-Perez (D)
- Assemblyman Bill Moen (D) , and
- Assemblyman William Spearman (D)

== Electoral history ==
=== Assembly ===
5th Legislative District General Election, 2023
Party	Candidate	Votes	%
Democratic	William W. Spearman (incumbent)	25,994	35.1
Democratic	William F. Moen Jr. (incumbent)	25,757	34.7
Republican	Joe Miller	11,386	15.4
Republican	Yalinda Pagan	11,048	14.9
Total votes		74,135	100.0
Democratic hold			

New Jersey General Assembly Elections 2021, District 5
Party	Candidate	Votes	%
Democratic	William F. Moen Jr. (Incumbent)	30,442	28.7
Democratic	William W. Spearman (Incumbent)	30,059	28.3
Republican	Samuel DiMatteo	23,007	21.7
Republican	Sean Sepsey	22,413	21.1
Total votes		105,921	100.0

New Jersey General Assembly Elections 2019, District 5
Party	Candidate	Votes	%
Democratic	William Spearman (Incumbent)	21,533	33.9
Democratic	William Moen, Jr.	20,743	32.7
Republican	Nicholas Kush	10,711	16.8
Republican	Kevin Ehret	10,442	16.4
Total votes		63,429	100.0

Special election, November 6, 2018
Party	Candidate	Votes	%
Democratic	William W. Spearman	38,341	65.2
Republican	Nicholas Kush	20,506	34.8
Total votes		58,847	100.0
