= Arthur Barclay (American politician) =

American basketball player and politician

Member of the New Jersey General Assembly from the 5th district
- In office January 12, 2016 – June 18, 2018 Serving with Patricia Egan Jones
- Preceded by: Gilbert "Whip" Wilson
- Succeeded by: William Spearman

Personal details
- Born: April 29, 1982 (age 44)
- Party: Democratic
- Website: Legislative web page

Arthur Barclay (born April 29, 1982) is an American former collegiate basketball player and Democratic Party politician who represented the 5th Legislative District in the New Jersey General Assembly from when he was sworn into office on January 12, 2016, until he resigned from office on June 18, 2018, after being charged with assault relating to domestic violence.

== High school and collegiate basketball career ==
A native of Camden, Barclay graduated from Camden High School as part of the class of 2000. During his senior year, he was captain of the Camden Panthers basketball team that won the NJSIAA Tournament of Champions, defeating Seton Hall Preparatory School in the championship game by a score of 50–46; The 6-foot-8-inch (2.03 m) forward had 12 points and 14 rebounds in the win, with 27 points from teammate and future NBA player Dajuan Wagner. Barclay scored 1,259 points in his high school career and was recognized in 2013 by inclusion in the South Jersey Basketball Hall of Fame.

John Calipari recruited Wagner to the University of Memphis in June 2000, simultaneously agreeing to give Barclay a scholarship position on the team.

Barclay played for three years on the Memphis Tigers men's basketball team, averaging 2.6 points per game in the 2001–02 season, 2.1 points a game in 2003–04 and 2.1 points per game in 2004–05. He graduated with a bachelor's degree in sociology from Memphis.

He has worked for the Camden County Department of Events and Community Outreach and been an assistant basketball coach at Camden High School.

== Elected office ==
Barcaly lost a bid for election to an at-large seat on the Camden City Council in 2009 as part of a slate with Mayor Angel Cordero.

After Councilwoman Deborah Person-Polk decided against running for a second term of office, Barclay was selected by the Camden County Democratic Committee in April 2013 to replace Person-Polk and run for City Council in the Democratic primary under the official party line. After winning in the primary, Barclay was elected in the November 2013 general election and served on the Camden City Council from 2014 to 2016.

Barclay was chosen to fill one of the two Democratic Party ballot spots for the November 2015 general election after primary victor Holly Cass volunteered to step aside. His Assembly running mate, Patricia Egan Jones had been chosen to fill the Assembly seat and ballot position that had been held by Angel Fuentes until he resigned from office.

As a member of the General Assembly, Barclay has been appointed to serve on the Higher Education Committee and the Law and Public Safety Committee.

New Jersey General Assembly
| Preceded by Gilbert "Whip" Wilson | Member of the New Jersey General Assembly for the 5th District; January 12, 2016 – June 18, 2018; With: Patricia Egan Jones | Succeeded by William Spearman |
