= Angel Fuentes =

Puerto Rican politician

Member of the New Jersey General Assembly from the 5th district
- In office January 12, 2010 – June 30, 2015 Serving with Gilbert "Whip" Wilson
- Preceded by: Nilsa Cruz-Perez; Joseph J. Roberts
- Succeeded by: Patricia Egan Jones

Personal details
- Born: August 2, 1961 (age 64) Aguadilla, Puerto Rico
- Website: Legislative web page

Angel Fuentes (born August 2, 1961) is an American Democratic Party politician who was elected to serve in the General Assembly from 2009 until June 2015, where he represented the 5th legislative district. Fuentes was the president of the city council in Camden, New Jersey's seventh-largest city, serving from 2000 to 2010, stepping down to take the Assembly seat. He resigned from his Assembly seat in June 2015 in order to become a deputy clerk for Camden County.

== Early life and education ==
Fuentes was raised in Camden, where he graduated from Woodrow Wilson High School. He then attended St. John Vianney College Seminary in Miami, Florida, earning a B.A. degree in philosophy. He then successfully pursued certification by the state of New Jersey as a social worker.

== Camden City Council ==
Fuentes represented Camden's Fourth Ward, which includes Downtown Camden, the Camden Waterfront, and the North Camden, Cramer Hill, and Cooper Grant neighborhoods. He resides in the Cramer Hill neighborhood.

As a city councilman, Fuentes was a major proponent of youth and senior citizens' programs, efforts toward social justice, and anti-crime efforts. During his tenure on the council, Fuentes helped to create or spearheaded the creation of a Citizen Public Safety Council, Ethics and Municipal Human Relations Commissions, a Taxicab Commission, a Public Safety Council, and an Asian American Advisory Board. Notably, Fuentes has led a crusade against graffiti in the city of Camden, which included the establishment of an anti-graffiti task force, the implementation of an anti-graffiti curriculum in local schools, and a related hotline. Favoring efficiency and accountability in government, Fuentes published a Ten Point Plan for city government reform. Fuentes enjoys close ties with the Save Our Waterfront in North Camden organization and the Cramer Hill Neighborhood Advisory Board.

== Other activities ==
Beyond the city council, Fuentes serves on the Strategic Planning Committee for the United States Hispanic Leadership Institute. He is a member of the National Association of Latino Elected and Appointed Officials. He also serves on the boards of directors for the Camden County Chapter of the American Red Cross, the Greater Camden Partnership, and the Cooper's Ferry Development Board.

In 1997, he was recognized by the Camden County Office of Hispanic Affairs & Community Development as an Outstanding Community Leader. Since then he has received addition public service awards from the American Red Cross, the Peace Troopers of Camden City, and the faith-based initiative Christian Quarterly, Inc., among others.

== New Jersey General Assembly ==
In 2009, both incumbent Democratic Assembly members, Nilsa Cruz-Perez and Joseph J. Roberts announced their retirements from the Assembly. In the general election, Fuentes and running mate Donald Norcross soundly defeated the Republican nominees, Brian Kluchnick and Stepfanie Velez-Gentry. Norcross would be appointed to a vacant Senate seat about a week after being sworn into the Assembly; Gilbert "Whip" Wilson would become Fuentes's 5th District Assembly partner for the remainder of his time there. After being re-elected in 2011 and 2013, Fuentes again won the Democratic nomination for an Assembly seat in 2015 before being tapped to become a deputy clerk for Camden County Clerk Joseph Ripa. Though under state law he would not have to resign to take the position, he submitted his resignation effective June 30. The Camden and Gloucester County Democratic Committees will name his replacement on the 2015 general election ballot and nominate a person to fill the remainder of Fuentes's Assembly term.

== District 5 ==
Each of the forty districts in the New Jersey Legislature has one representative in the New Jersey Senate and two members in the New Jersey General Assembly. The other representatives from the 5th District for the legislative sessions in which he served are:

- Senator Donald Norcross (D), Senator Nilsa Cruz-Perez (D)
- Assemblyman Donald Norcross (D), Assemblyman Gilbert "Whip" Wilson (D)

New Jersey General Assembly
Preceded by Nilsa Cruz-Perez; Joseph J. Roberts	Member of the New Jersey General Assembly for the 5th District; January 12, 2010–June 30, 2015; With: Donald Norcross, Gilbert "Whip" Wilson	Succeeded by To be announced
