= Patricia Egan Jones =

American politician

Member of the New Jersey General Assembly from the 5th District
- In office November 9, 2015 – January 14, 2020
- Preceded by: Angel Fuentes
- Succeeded by: Bill Moen

Camden County Surrogate
- In office January 1, 2001 – July 31, 2015
- Preceded by: Barbara Rosenbleeth
- Succeeded by: Cheryl Austin

Member of the Camden County Board of Chosen Freeholders
- In office January 1, 1998 – December 31, 2000

Personal details
- Party: Democratic
- Education: Mount Aloysius College
- Website: Legislative web page

Patricia Egan Jones is an American Democratic Party politician who represented the 5th Legislative District in the New Jersey General Assembly since she was sworn into office on November 9, 2015, until her retirement in January 2020.

== Early life ==
A resident of Barrington, Jones received an associate degree from Mount Aloysius College in fine arts and a bachelor's degree from Rutgers University–Camden with a major in political science. Before pursuing elected office, Jones had worked as chief of staff for Joseph J. Roberts, Speaker of the General Assembly, and later as legislator director for Walter Rand. Jones served on the Barrington Borough Council from 1996 to 1998.

She was elected to countywide positions in Camden County, serving on the Board of Chosen Freeholders from 1998 to 2000 and as the County Surrogate from 2001 to 2015. As a freeholder, Jones was an advocate for bringing the USS New Jersey to the Camden Waterfront on the Delaware River.

== New Jersey Assembly ==
Angel Fuentes and Holly Cass had won the Democratic Party primary for the two Assembly seats to be on the ballot for the November 2015 general election. After Fuentes resigned from office, Jones was selected to run for the new term of office and to fill the balance of the term of the vacant seat. Arthur Barclay was chosen to fill the other ballot spot after primary victor Holly Cass volunteered to step aside. After the ballot results were certified, Jones was sworn into office on November 9 by Assembly Speaker Vincent Prieto. In the Assembly, Jones is co-sponsor of a bill introduced in June 2016 that would designate the USS New Jersey as the official state ship. On March 14, 2019, Jones announces she would not run for re-election in 2019.

=== Committees ===
- Transportation and Independent Authorities
- Budget
- Higher Education

== Electoral history ==
=== Assembly ===
New Jersey general election, 2017
Party	Candidate	Votes	%	±%
Democratic	Patricia Egan Jones	29,282	34.6	▲0.6
Democratic	Arthur Barclay	27,544	32.5	▲0.5
Republican	Teresa L. Gordon	14,181	16.8	▼0.9
Republican	Kevin Ehret	13,625	16.1	▼0.2
Total votes		'84,632'	'100.0'	

New Jersey General Assembly
Preceded by Angel Fuentes	Member of the New Jersey General Assembly for the 5th District; November 9, 2015 – January 14, 2020; With: Gilbert "Whip" Wilson, Arthur Barclay, William Spearman	Succeeded by Bill Moen
