= Elizabeth Maher Muoio =

American politician

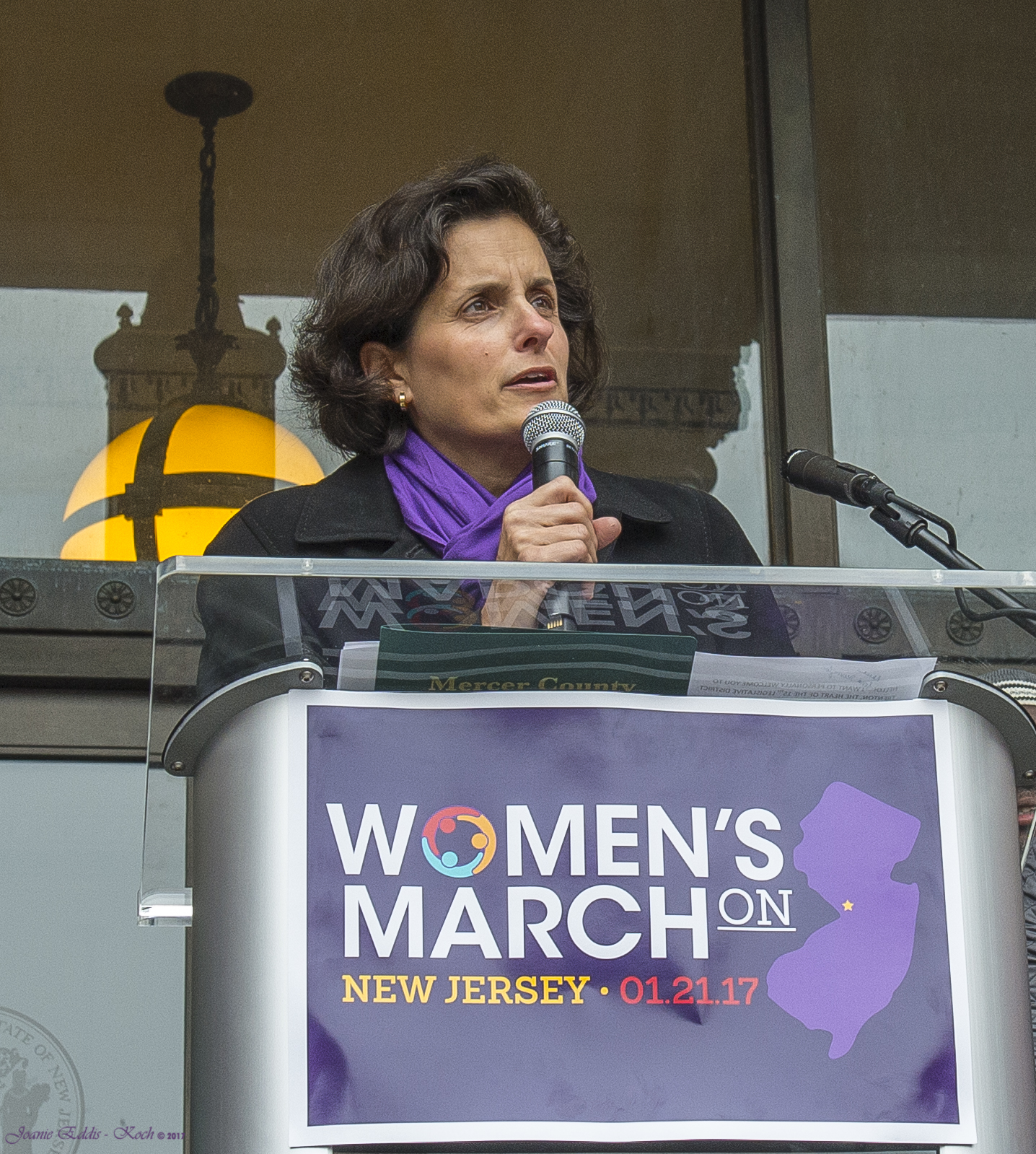

Treasurer of New Jersey
- In office January 16, 2018 – January 20, 2026; Acting: January 16, 2018 – April 12, 2018
- Governor: Phil Murphy
- Preceded by: Ford Scudder
- Succeeded by: Aaron Binder

Member of the New Jersey General Assembly from the 15th district
- In office February 5, 2015 – January 15, 2018 Serving with Reed Gusciora
- Preceded by: Bonnie Watson Coleman
- Succeeded by: Verlina Reynolds-Jackson

Member of the Mercer County Board of County Freeholders
- In office January 1, 2001 – March 18, 2008

Personal details
- Party: Democratic
- Spouse: Joseph Muoio
- Children: 3
- Education: Wesleyan University (BA); Georgetown University (JD)

Elizabeth Maher Muoio is an American Democratic Party politician who served as the Treasurer of New Jersey from 2018 to 2026. Previously, she had been a member of the New Jersey General Assembly, the lower house of the New Jersey Legislature, representing the 15th Legislative District from 2015 to 2018. She had also served as a councilwoman from the borough of Pennington and a Mercer County Freeholder.

== Early life and education ==
Muoio earned a B.A. in history from Wesleyan University and a J.D. of law from Georgetown University Law School. While at Georgetown, she served as director of constituent services and later as legislative director for Texas Congressman Jack Brooks.

== Local political career ==
Muoio's first elected office that she won was serving on the Pennington Borough Council from 1997 until 2001. In 2000, she was elected to the Mercer County Board of County Freeholders and was re-elected in 2003 and 2006. During her final year on the board, she served as vice-chair. In February 2008, County Executive Brian M. Hughes appointed Muoio to become the director of economic development for the county; she resigned from her position upon taking this job. While serving in this position, Muoio was elected to be chair of the Mercer County Democratic Committee in 2010 and was re-elected in 2012 and 2014.

== New Jersey General Assembly ==
After 15th District Assemblywoman Bonnie Watson Coleman was elected to Congress in 2014, Muoio was speculated to become the appointed replacement to her in the Assembly. Muoio and her county committee strongly backed Watson Coleman in the Democratic primary for the Congressional seat in 2014. Though initially other candidates announced intentions to run for the nomination to be appointed to the Assembly seat, members of the Mercer and Hunterdon County Democratic committees unanimously chose Muoio to fill the seat.

She was sworn in on February 5, 2015, in the Assembly chamber with her husband, two of her sons, and various local officials present. In the Assembly, she served on the Regulated Professions Committee and the Women and Children Committee. Muoio went on to win in the 2015 general election and started her first full term as assemblywoman the following January.

The 15th district consists of most of Mercer County (including the capital city of Trenton) and East Amwell Township, Lambertville, and West Amwell Township in Hunterdon County. The other representatives from the 15th District for the 2018–2019 Legislative Session are Gusciora in the Assembly, while Muoio's Senate colleague is Democrat Shirley Turner.

== Treasurer of New Jersey ==
Muoio was nominated by Governor Phil Murphy to serve as the Treasurer of New Jersey. She resigned from the Assembly effective January 15, 2018, as well as from her position as director of economic development for Mercer County in order to begin work in the executive branch, in advance of her confirmation by the New Jersey Senate; her resignation came less than a week after being sworn into office for her second full term in the Assembly. She was confirmed by the full New Jersey Senate on April 12, 2018.

== Personal life ==
She has lived in Pennington with her husband Joseph Muoio since 1995 and has three children. Muoio has served on many boards and commissions including Pennington Borough public commissions, the Pennington Library's board of trustees, and in the Hopewell Valley League of Women Voters.

== See also ==
- Governorship of Phil Murphy

New Jersey General Assembly
Preceded by Bonnie Watson Coleman	Member of the New Jersey General Assembly from the 15th district 2015–2018; Served alongside: Reed Gusciora	Succeeded by Verlina Reynolds-Jackson
Political offices
Preceded by Ford Scudder	Treasurer of New Jersey; 2018–2026	Succeeded by Aaron Binder
