= DiAnne Gove =

Member of the New Jersey General Assembly

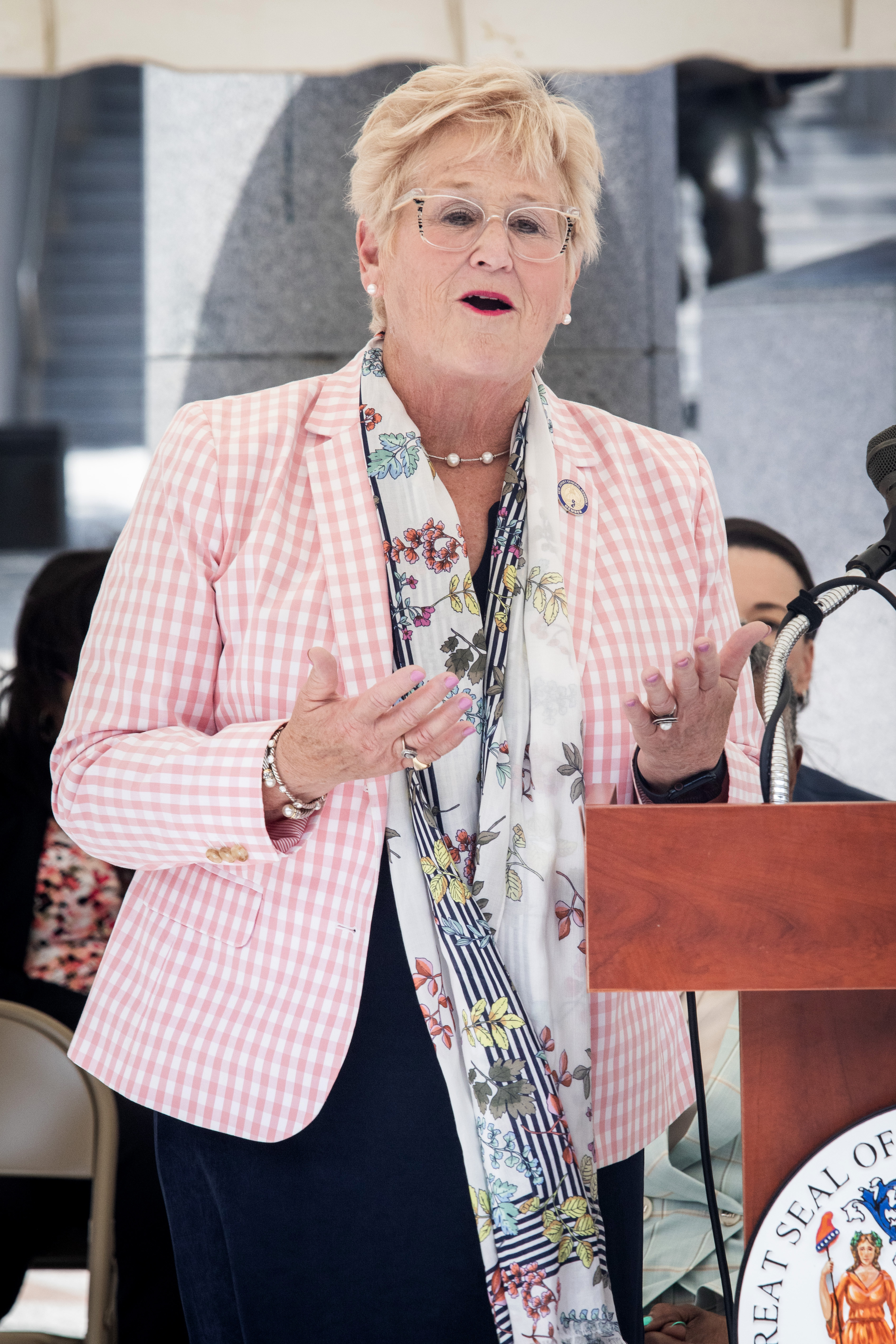

Member of the New Jersey General Assembly from the 9th district
- In office December 7, 2009 – January 9, 2024 Serving with Brian E. Rumpf
- Preceded by: Daniel Van Pelt
- Succeeded by: Greg Myhre

Personal details
- Born: February 15, 1951 (age 75)
- Party: Republican
- Education: Cabrini College (BA); Monmouth College (MA)
- Occupation: Teacher
- Website: Legislative Website

DiAnne C. Gove (born February 15, 1951) is an American Republican Party politician who served in the New Jersey General Assembly representing the 9th Legislative District from 2009 to 2024. She was sworn in on December 7, 2009, to fill the vacant seat left by the resignation of fellow Republican Daniel Van Pelt after his arrest on corruption charges. She had been the Minority Policy Co-Chair in the General Assembly starting in 2014.

== Early life ==
Gove is the daughter of Anne Christoph and Richard Raymond Gove. She was raised in the Brant Beach section of Long Beach Township and attended Southern Regional High School in Manahawkin. She received a Bachelor of Arts from Cabrini College and later a Master of Arts from Monmouth University, both degrees in social science. Gove spent more than three decades in the faculty at Southern Regional High School, where she taught history and government. She served as mayor of Long Beach Township from 2004-2008 and served three terms as a Long Beach Township Commissioner. Gove served as a commissioner on the Ocean County Utilities Authority.

== New Jersey Assembly ==
Gove was selected on August 12, 2009, by delegates from the Ocean County, Atlantic County, and Burlington County Republican Committees to fill a vacancy in the General Assembly created by the resignation of Republican Assemblyman Daniel Van Pelt on July 31, 2009. Van Pelt had been arrested as part of Operation Bid Rig by federal agents on July 23, 2009, and charged with accepting a $10,000 bribe from a cooperating witness. At the special convention, all others candidates for the seat formally withdrew their names from contention and endorsed Gove. She served the remainder of Van Pelt's term, which ended in January 2010. She also replaced Van Pelt on the November ballot, running for a term in her own right. Gove stated that "getting the confidence of the people back into government" was an important part of her campaign. She and Assemblyman Brian E. Rumpf won easily in the heavily Republican 9th district. Gove became the first woman to represent the 9th district since Virginia E. Haines resigned from office in 1994 to head the New Jersey Lottery, and the sixth woman to represent the county in the state legislature.

Gove decided not to run in the June 2023 primary, after a screening committee supported incumbent Rumpf and newcomer Greg Myhre for the two Assembly seats.

== Electoral history ==
=== Assembly ===
New Jersey general election, 2017
Party	Candidate	Votes	%	±%
Republican	Brian E. Rumpf	40,158	31.9	▼1.5
Republican	DiAnne C. Gove	39,523	31.4	▼1.1
Democratic	Jill Dobrowansky	23,534	18.7	▲1.3
Democratic	Ryan Young	22,721	18.0	▲1.3
Total votes		'125,936'	'100.0'	

New Jersey general election, 2015
Party	Candidate	Votes	%	±%
Republican	Brian E. Rumpf	24,325	33.4	▼2.1
Republican	DiAnne C. Gove	23,676	32.5	▼1.5
Democratic	Fran Zimmer	12,638	17.4	▲1.6
Democratic	John Bingham	12,171	16.7	▲2.0
Total votes		'72,810'	'100.0'	

New Jersey general election, 2013
Party	Candidate	Votes	%	±%
Republican	Brian E. Rumpf	45,690	35.5	▲3.2
Republican	DiAnne C. Gove	43,695	34.0	▲2.8
Democratic	Christopher J. McManus	20,354	15.8	▼2.6
Democratic	Peter Ferwerda III	18,872	14.7	▼3.4
Total votes		'128,611'	'100.0'	

New Jersey general election, 2011
Party	Candidate	Votes	%
Republican	Brian E. Rumpf	30,896	32.3
Republican	DiAnne C. Gove	29,898	31.2
Democratic	Carla Kearney	17,648	18.4
Democratic	Bradley Billhimer	17,338	18.1
Total votes		95,780	100.0

New Jersey general election, 2009
Party	Candidate	Votes	%	±%
Republican	Brian E. Rumpf	54,311	34.2	▲3.9
Republican	DiAnne Gove	52,667	33.2	▲4.7
Democratic	Richard P. Visotcky	26,482	16.7	▼4.2
Democratic	Robert E. Rue	25,365	16.0	▼4.3
Total votes		'158,825'	'100.0'	

New Jersey General Assembly
Preceded by Daniel Van Pelt	Member of the New Jersey General Assembly for the 9th District; December 7, 2009 – present With: Brian E. Rumpf	Succeeded by Incumbent
