= 1993 New Jersey General Assembly election =

- November 2, 1993

All 80 seats to the General Assembly 41 seats needed for a majority
- Turnout: 65% (▲14pp)

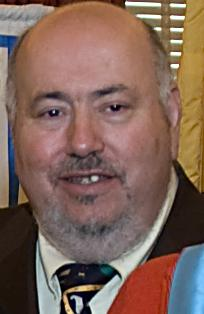
	Majority party	Minority party
Leader	Chuck Haytaian	Joseph Doria
Party	Republican	Democratic
Leader since	January 9, 1990	January 12, 1988
Leader's seat	23rd (Independence Township)	31st (Bayonne)
Last election	58	22
Seats won	53	27
Seat change	▼5	▲5
- Results: Democratic gain Republican hold Democratic hold
Speaker before election
Chuck Haytaian
Republican
Elected Speaker
Chuck Haytaian
Republican

The 1993 New Jersey General Assembly elections were held on November 2, 1993, for all 80 seats in the lower house of the New Jersey Legislature. The election coincided with a gubernatorial election where Democrat James Florio lost re-election. Republicans held a 58–22 majority in the lower house prior to the election. The members of the New Jersey Legislature are chosen from 40 electoral districts. Each district elects one state senator and two State Assembly members. New Jersey uses coterminous legislative districts for both its State Senate and General Assembly.

Democrats were able to flip one seat in the 2nd, 4th, 15th, and both in the 7th.

== Incumbents not seeking re-election ==
=== Democratic ===
- John S. Watson, District 15
- George Hudak, District 20
- Thomas G. Dunn, District 20
- Robert L. Brown, District 27
- Quilla E. Talmadge, District 27
- Byron Baer, District 37

=== Republican ===
- Robert Singer, District 30

== Summary of results by district ==
Legislative District	Position	Incumbent	Party	Elected Assembly Member	Party
1st	1	Frank LoBiondo	Republican	Frank LoBiondo	Republican
1st	2	John C. Gibson	Republican	John C. Gibson	Republican
2nd	1	Frederick P. Nickles	Republican	Tom Foley	Democratic
2nd	2	John F. Gaffney	Republican	John F. Gaffney	Republican
3rd	1	Jack Collins	Republican	Jack Collins	Republican
3rd	2	Gary Stuhltrager	Republican	Gary Stuhltrager	Republican
4th	1	Mary Virginia Weber	Republican	Sean F. Dalton	Democrat
4th	2	George Geist	Republican	George Geist	Republican
5th	1	Wayne R. Bryant	Democrat	Wayne R. Bryant	Democrat
5th	2	Joseph J. Roberts	Democrat	Joseph J. Roberts	Democrat
6th	1	Lee A. Solomon	Republican	Lee A. Solomon	Republican
6th	2	John A. Rocco	Republican	John A. Rocco	Republican
7th	1	José F. Sosa	Republican	George E. Williams	Democrat
7th	2	Priscilla B. Anderson	Republican	Steven M. Petrillo	Democrat
8th	1	Harold L. Colburn Jr.	Republican	Harold L. Colburn Jr.	Republican
8th	2	Robert C. Shinn Jr.	Republican	Robert C. Shinn Jr.	Republican
9th	1	Jeffrey Moran	Republican	Jeffrey Moran	Republican
9th	2	Christopher J. Connors	Republican	Christopher J. Connors	Republican
10th	1	Virginia E. Haines	Republican	Virginia E. Haines	Republican
10th	2	David W. Wolfe	Republican	David W. Wolfe	Republican
11th	1	Thomas S. Smith	Republican	Thomas S. Smith	Republican
11th	2	Steve Corodemus	Republican	Steve Corodemus	Republican
12th	1	Clare Farragher	Republican	Clare Farragher	Republican
12th	2	Michael Arnone	Republican	Michael Arnone	Republican
13th	1	Joann H. Smith	Republican	Joann H. Smith	Republican
13th	2	Joseph Azzolina	Republican	Joseph Azzolina	Republican
14th	1	Paul Kramer	Republican	Paul Kramer	Republican
14th	2	Barbara W. Wright	Republican	Barbara W. Wright	Republican
15th	1	John S. Watson	Democrat	Shirley Turner	Democrat
15th	2	John W. Hartmann	Republican	Joseph Yuhas	Democrat
16th	1	Walter J. Kavanaugh	Republican	Walter J. Kavanaugh	Republican
16th	2	Christopher Bateman	Republican	Christopher Bateman	Republican
17th	1	Bob Smith	Democrat	Bob Smith	Democrat
17th	2	Jerry Green	Democrat	Jerry Green	Democrat
18th	1	Jeffrey A. Warsh	Republican	Jeffrey A. Warsh	Republican
18th	2	Harriet E. Derman	Republican	Harriet E. Derman	Republican
19th	1	Stephen A. Mikulak	Republican	Stephen A. Mikulak	Republican
19th	2	Ernest L. Oros	Republican	Ernest L. Oros	Republican
20th	1	Thomas G. Dunn	Democrat	Neil M. Cohen	Democrat
20th	2	George Hudak	Democrat	Joseph Suliga	Democrat
21st	1	Monroe Jay Lustbader	Republican	Monroe Jay Lustbader	Republican
21st	2	Maureen Ogden	Republican	Maureen Ogden	Republican
22nd	1	Richard Bagger	Republican	Richard Bagger	Republican
22nd	2	Alan Augustine	Republican	Alan Augustine	Republican
23rd	1	Leonard Lance	Republican	Leonard Lance	Republican
23rd	2	Chuck Haytaian	Republican	Chuck Haytaian	Republican
24th	1	C. Richard Kamin	Republican	C. Richard Kamin	Republican
24th	2	Scott Garrett	Republican	Scott Garrett	Republican
25th	1	Rodney Frelinghuysen	Republican	Rodney P. Frelinghuysen	Republican
25th	2	Arthur R. Albohn	Republican	Arthur R. Albohn	Republican
26th	1	Alex DeCroce	Republican	Alex DeCroce	Republican
26th	2	Carol J. Murphy	Republican	Carol J. Murphy	Republican
27th	1	Robert L. Brown	Democrat	LeRoy J. Jones Jr.	Democrat
27th	2	Quilla E. Talmadge	Democrat	Nia Gill	Democrat
28th	1	Harry A. McEnroe	Democrat	Harry A. McEnroe	Democrat
28th	2	James Zangari	Democrat	James Zangari	Democrat
29th	1	Willie B. Brown	Democrat	Willie B. Brown	Democrat
29th	2	Jackie Mattison	Democrat	Jackie Mattison	Democrat
30th	1	Joseph Malone	Republican	Joseph Malone	Republican
30th	2	Robert Singer	Republican	Melvin Cottrell	Republican
31st	1	Joseph Doria	Democrat	Joseph Doria	Democrat
31st	2	Joseph Charles	Democrat	Joseph Charles	Democrat
32nd	1	Joan M. Quigley	Democrat	Joan Quigley	Democrat
32nd	2	Anthony Impreveduto	Democrat	Anthony Impreveduto	Democrat
33rd	1	Louis Romano	Democrat	Louis Romano	Democrat
33rd	2	Raul Garcia	Democrat	Raul Garcia	Democrat
34th	1	Marion Crecco	Republican	Marion Crecco	Republican
34th	2	Gerald H. Zecker	Republican	Gerald H. Zecker	Republican
35th	1	Bill Pascrell	Democrat	Bill Pascrell	Democrat
35th	2	Frank Catania	Republican	Frank Catania	Republican
36th	1	Paul DiGaetano	Republican	Paul DiGaetano	Republican
36th	2	John V. Kelly	Republican	John V. Kelly	Republican
37th	1	Ken Zisa	Democrat	Ken Zisa	Democrat
37th	2	Byron Baer	Democrat	Loretta Weinberg	Democrat
38th	1	Patrick J. Roma	Republican	Patrick J. Roma	Republican
38th	2	Rose Marie Heck	Republican	Rose Marie Heck	Republican
39th	1	Charlotte Vandervalk	Republican	Charlotte Vandervalk	Republican
39th	2	John E. Rooney	Republican	John E. Rooney	Republican
40th	1	Nicholas Felice	Republican	Nicholas Felice	Republican
40th	2	David C. Russo	Republican	David Russo	Republican

=== Close races ===
Districts where the difference of total votes between the top-two parties was under 10%:

1. District 4, 1.4% gain D
2. District 19, 3.6%
3. District 2, 4.0% gain D
4. District 15, 6.9% gain D
5. District 6, 8.4%
6. District 11, 8.9%

== List of races ==
=== District 1 ===
New Jersey general election, 1993
Party	Candidate	Votes	%	±%
Republican	Frank A. LoBiondo	36,941	31.2	▼0.5
Republican	John C. Gibson	32,959	27.9	▼0.2
Democratic	Ronald J. Casella	23,983	20.3	▼0.3
Democratic	Bruce M. Gorman	23,493	19.9	▲0.3
Libertarian	Scott L. Derby	959	0.8	N/A
Total votes		118,335	100.0	

=== District 2 ===
New Jersey general election, 1993
Party	Candidate	Votes	%	±%
Republican	John F. Gaffney	26,354	26.4	▼0.1
Democratic	Tom Foley	25,932	26.0	▲2.8
Republican	Fredrick P. Nickles	25,601	25.6	▲0.2
Democratic	Denis Floge	21,959	22.0	▼2.9
Total votes		99,846	100.0	

=== District 3 ===
New Jersey general election, 1993
Party	Candidate	Votes	%	±%
Republican	Jack Collins	38,013	32.2	▲2.8
Republican	Gary W. Stuhltrager	37,021	31.4	▲2.8
Democratic	Joseph J. Riley	21,959	18.6	▼1.2
Democratic	Amelia B. Kressler	21,062	17.8	▼1.9
Total votes		118,055	100.0	

=== District 4 ===
New Jersey general election, 1993
Party	Candidate	Votes	%	±%
Republican	George F. Geist	26,428	25.0	▼0.2
Democratic	Sean F. Dalton	26,366	25.0	▲0.2
Republican	Mary Virginia "Ginny" Weber	25,667	24.3	▼1.9
Democratic	Sandra L. Love	25,046	23.7	▼0.1
United We Stand	Kirk Errickson	2,061	2.0	N/A
Total votes		105,568	100.0	

=== District 5 ===
New Jersey general election, 1993
Party	Candidate	Votes	%	±%
Democratic	Wayne R. Bryant	28,905	34.9	▲2.6
Democratic	Joseph J. Roberts, Jr.	28,739	34.7	▲2.8
Republican	Hans Berg	12,851	15.5	▼3.0
Republican	Merle Ways	12,254	14.8	▼2.5
Total votes		82,749	100.0	

=== District 6 ===
New Jersey general election, 1993
Party	Candidate	Votes	%	±%
Republican	John A. Rocco	35,316	27.2	▼1.3
Republican	Lee A. Solomon	35,089	27.0	▼1.1
Democratic	Jane M. Kershner	30,208	23.3	▲1.4
Democratic	John Phillip Maroccia	29,142	22.5	▲0.9
Total votes		129,755	100.0	

=== District 7 ===
New Jersey general election, 1993
Party	Candidate	Votes	%	±%
Democratic	Steven M. Petrillo	30,982	28.1	▲3.9
Democratic	George E. Williams	30,896	28.0	▲4.5
Republican	Jose F. Sosa	24,354	22.1	▼4.0
Republican	Priscilla B. Anderson	24,122	21.9	▼4.3
Total votes		110,354	100.0	

=== District 8 ===
New Jersey general election, 1993
Party	Candidate	Votes	%	±%
Republican	Harold L. Colburn	36,157	30.4	▼1.9
Republican	Robert C. Shinn, Jr.	36,022	30.2	▼2.3
Democratic	Cesare D. Napoliello	23,514	19.7	▲1.7
Democratic	Harvey Dinerman	23,425	19.7	▲2.5
Total votes		119,118	100.0	

=== District 9 ===
New Jersey general election, 1993
Party	Candidate	Votes	%	±%
Republican	Christopher J. Connors	49,885	32.5	▼2.2
Republican	Jeffrey W. Moran	49,363	32.2	▼2.4
Democratic	Thomas Woolsey	27,046	17.6	▲2.1
Democratic	Robert K. Smith	26,979	17.6	▲2.4
Total votes		153,273	100.0	

=== District 10 ===
New Jersey general election, 1993
Party	Candidate	Votes	%	±%
Republican	Virginia “Ginny” Haines	42,132	30.4	▼1.2
Republican	David W. Wolfe	42,010	30.3	▼0.6
Democratic	Thomas J. Mallon	26,101	18.8	▼0.4
Democratic	John F. Phillips	25,096	18.1	▼0.2
Conservative	Gary J. Rich	1,820	1.3	N/A
Conservative	Michael S. Permuko	1,647	1.2	N/A
Total votes		138,806	100.0	

=== District 11 ===
New Jersey general election, 1993
Party	Candidate	Votes	%	±%
Republican	Tom Smith	33,190	26.9	▲1.4
Republican	Steve Corodemus	32,748	26.5	▲1.1
Democratic	John A. Villapiano	28,259	22.9	▲0.5
Democratic	Daniel P. Jacobson	26,675	21.6	▲1.0
Conservative	Allen Lorentson	938	0.8	N/A
Conservative	Anthony Rajoppe	937	0.8	N/A
Libertarian	Keith Quarles	723	0.6	N/A
Total votes		123,470	100.0	

=== District 12 ===
New Jersey general election, 1993
Party	Candidate	Votes	%	±%
Republican	Michael J. Arnone	41,450	31.8	▼0.2
Republican	Clare M. Farragher	41,061	31.5	▼0.4
Democratic	Lillian Harris	24,281	18.6	▲2.3
Democratic	Fred Eckhaus	23,676	18.1	▲2.3
Total votes		130,468	100.0	

=== District 13 ===
New Jersey general election, 1993
Party	Candidate	Votes	%	±%
Republican	Joann H. Smith	37,489	30.6	▼2.3
Republican	Joseph Azzolina	36,497	29.8	▼1.3
Democratic	Sara B. Stewart	24,095	19.7	▲1.1
Democratic	Edward Testino	23,407	19.1	▲1.7
Independents 4 Change	Louis J. Barbarino	976	0.8	N/A
Total votes		122,464	100.0	

=== District 14 ===
New Jersey general election, 1993
Party	Candidate	Votes	%	±%
Republican	Barbara W. Wright	37,626	28.3	▲1.3
Republican	Paul R. Kramer	36,767	27.7	▼1.4
Democratic	Janice S. Mironov	29,573	22.3	▲2.7
Democratic	Nina Kelty	27,570	20.7	▲4.1
Libertarian	Benjamin Grindlinger	570	0.4	N/A
Repeal State Mandates	Harold E. Swartz	387	0.3	N/A
Populist	Michael S. Schoellkopf	385	0.3	N/A
Total votes		132,878	100.0	

=== District 15 ===
New Jersey general election, 1993
Party	Candidate	Votes	%	±%
Democratic	Shirley K. Turner	25,759	25.7	▲4.4
Democratic	Joseph Yuhas	23,714	23.7	▲4.2
Republican	John Hartmann	23,495	23.5	▼1.7
Republican	Donald C. Addison, Jr.	19,062	19.0	▼2.2
Independent	Carl J. Mayer	6,531	6.5	N/A
For the People	Tony Belardo	1,361	1.4	N/A
Constitutional Enforcer	Clinton C. Barlow	235	0.2	N/A
Total votes		100,157	100.0	

=== District 16 ===
New Jersey general election, 1993
Party	Candidate	Votes	%	±%
Republican	Christopher “Kip” Bateman	44,646	32.0	▼1.7
Republican	Walter J. Kavanaugh	43,703	31.3	▼4.2
Democratic	Karen Carroll	26,268	18.8	▲3.1
Democratic	Amedeo F. D’Adamo, Jr.	23,438	16.8	▲1.7
Initiative and Referendum	James N. Carides	1,510	1.1	N/A
Total votes		139,565	100.0	

=== District 17 ===
New Jersey general election, 1993
Party	Candidate	Votes	%	±%
Democratic	Bob Smith	26,480	32.0	▲5.9
Democratic	Jerry Green	25,633	31.0	▲6.1
Republican	Al Smith	15,463	18.7	▼4.3
Republican	John H. Bresnan	15,217	18.4	▼4.1
Total votes		82,793	100.0	

=== District 18 ===
New Jersey general election, 1993
Party	Candidate	Votes	%	±%
Republican	Harriet Derman	36,358	29.9	▲0.3
Republican	Jeff Warsh	34,491	28.3	▼0.1
Democratic	Thomas H. Paterniti	26,029	21.4	▲0.2
Democratic	Matthew Vaughn	24,883	20.4	▼0.4
Total votes		121,761	100.0	

=== District 19 ===
New Jersey general election, 1993
Party	Candidate	Votes	%	±%
Republican	Stephen A. Mikulak	26,237	24.8	▼3.0
Republican	Ernest L. Oros	26,027	24.6	▼2.2
Democratic	John S. Wisniewski	25,627	24.2	▲1.0
Democratic	Joseph Vas	22,869	21.6	▼0.6
"Peoples Choice"	Marion Lipira	2,569	2.4	N/A
"Peoples Choice"	Theodore T. Moran	2,426	2.3	N/A
Total votes		105,755	100.0	

=== District 20 ===
New Jersey general election, 1993
Party	Candidate	Votes	%	±%
Democratic	Neil M. Cohen	20,676	25.9	▼0.8
Democratic	Joseph Suliga	20,300	25.5	▼0.2
Republican	Richard Hunt	14,329	18.0	▼6.1
Republican	Carmen Mendiola	12,905	16.2	▼7.3
For the People	Thomas W. Long	8,099	10.2	N/A
The Peoples Candidate	Jerry L. Coleman	3,388	4.3	N/A
Total votes		79,697	100.0	

=== District 21 ===
New Jersey general election, 1993
Party	Candidate	Votes	%	±%
Republican	Maureen Ogden	44,110	32.4	0.0
Republican	Monroe Jay Lustbader	42,599	31.3	▼0.8
Democratic	Robert A. Everett	24,842	18.2	▼1.1
Democratic	Michael N. Kurzawski	24,687	18.1	▲3.0
Total votes		136,238	100.0	

=== District 22 ===
New Jersey general election, 1993
Party	Candidate	Votes	%	±%
Republican	Richard H. Bagger	47,064	33.0	▼4.5
Republican	Alan M. Augustine	45,357	31.8	▼6.1
Democratic	Susan H. Pepper	26,972	18.9	▲6.4
Democratic	Carlton W. Hansen, Jr.	23,252	16.3	▲4.1
Total votes		142,645	100.0	

=== District 23 ===
New Jersey general election, 1993
Party	Candidate	Votes	%	±%
Republican	Garabed “Chuck” Haytaian	47,251	41.3	▲8.5
Republican	Leonard Lance	45,643	39.9	▲9.7
Democratic	Edward F. Dragan	21,425	18.7	▲3.4
Total votes		114,319	100.0	

=== District 24 ===
New Jersey general election, 1993
Party	Candidate	Votes	%	±%
Republican	E. Scott Garrett	46,673	43.4	▲3.8
Republican	Dick Kamin	45,491	42.3	▲3.0
Democratic	William Weightman	15,310	14.2	▼2.5
Total votes		107,474	100.0	

=== District 25 ===
New Jersey general election, 1993
Party	Candidate	Votes	%	±%
Republican	Rodney P. Frelinghuysen	48,596	36.9	▼0.3
Republican	Arthur R. Albohn	41,015	31.2	▼3.3
Democratic	Michael J. Andrisano	21,405	16.3	▲1.3
Democratic	Randy Davis	19,731	15.0	▲1.7
Constitutionalize the Fed	Mary Frueholz	801	0.6	N/A
Total votes		131,548	100.0	

=== District 26 ===
New Jersey general election, 1993
Party	Candidate	Votes	%	±%
Republican	Carol J. Murphy	45,593	34.8	▼2.8
Republican	Alex DeCroce	44,461	33.9	▼3.7
Democratic	Lorelei N. Mottese	21,013	16.0	▲3.9
Democratic	Daniel G. Tauriello	20,014	15.3	▲3.9
Total votes		131,081	100.0	

=== District 27 ===
New Jersey general election, 1993
Party	Candidate	Votes	%	±%
Democratic	LeRoy J. Jones, Jr.	28,680	35.2	▼2.8
Democratic	Nia H. Gill	28,143	34.5	▼2.1
Republican	Tod A. Thiese	11,938	14.6	▼6.1
Republican	Everett Jennings	11,809	14.5	N/A
Independent People's Choice	Anthony F. Montanelli	982	1.2	N/A
Total votes		81,552	100.0	

=== District 28 ===
New Jersey general election, 1993
Party	Candidate	Votes	%	±%
Democratic	Harry McEnroe	23,128	38.5	▲5.2
Democratic	James Zangari	21,357	35.5	▲3.1
Republican	Phyllis C. Cedola	8,354	13.9	▼1.6
Republican	Eugene L. Brenycz	7,282	12.1	▼3.4
Total votes		60,121	100.0	

=== District 29 ===
New Jersey general election, 1993
Party	Candidate	Votes	%	±%
Democratic	Willie B. Brown	20,015	50.1	▲13.7
Democratic	Jackie R. Mattison	18,439	46.2	▲12.2
Socialist Workers	Steven A. Marshall	750	1.9	▲0.8
Socialist Workers	Marilee F.D. Taylor	749	1.9	▲1.1
Total votes		39,953	100.0	

=== District 30 ===
New Jersey general election, 1993
Party	Candidate	Votes	%	±%
Republican	Joe Malone	30,457	30.8	▼3.8
Republican	Melvin Cottrell	29,809	30.1	▼3.0
Democratic	Michael Broderick	19,466	19.7	▲3.4
Democratic	Lou Gallagher	19,278	19.5	▲3.5
Total votes		99,010	100.0	

=== District 31 ===
New Jersey general election, 1993
Party	Candidate	Votes	%	±%
Democratic	Joseph Charles, Jr.	28,013	34.4	▲5.9
Democratic	Joseph V. Doria, Jr.	27,778	34.1	▲5.3
Republican	Michael Miller	12,947	15.9	▼5.7
Republican	Jim White	12,754	15.7	▼5.4
Total votes		81,492	100.0	

=== District 32 ===
New Jersey general election, 1993
Party	Candidate	Votes	%	±%
Democratic	Anthony Impreveduto	28,423	30.8	▲1.8
Democratic	Joan M. Quigley	27,562	29.9	▲2.4
Republican	Todd Hennessey	17,603	19.1	▼1.1
Republican	Manuel E. Fernandez	16,855	18.3	▼1.3
Politicians Are Crooks	Edith M. Shaw	1,114	1.2	▼0.7
Concerned Taxpayer's Coalition	William R. Dusenberry	587	0.6	N/A
Total votes		92,144	100.0	

=== District 33 ===
New Jersey general election, 1993
Party	Candidate	Votes	%	±%
Democratic	Raul “Rudy” Garcia	24,761	31.2	▼3.3
Democratic	Louis A. Romano	24,463	30.9	▼3.0
Republican	Mary C. Gaspar	14,387	18.1	▲2.2
Republican	Armando C. Hernandez	14,343	18.1	▲2.4
Impact '93	Ivan Dominguez	551	0.7	N/A
Independent Minority Movement	Bartolome Ruiz	396	0.5	N/A
Impact '93	Oscar Noa	385	0.5	N/A
Total votes		79,286	100.0	

=== District 34 ===
New Jersey general election, 1993
Party	Candidate	Votes	%	±%
Republican	Marion Crecco	36,577	29.8	▼4.3
Republican	Gerald H. Zecker	36,129	29.4	▼4.9
Democratic	Steven Gerber	24,561	20.0	▲4.1
Democratic	George Tosi	23,526	19.1	▲3.3
We the People	S. Patricia Comstock	1,090	0.9	N/A
We the People	Michael Cheski	1,044	0.8	N/A
Total votes		122,927	100.0	

=== District 35 ===
New Jersey general election, 1993
Party	Candidate	Votes	%	±%
Democratic	William J. Pascrell, Jr.	21,698	31.4	▲2.6
Republican	Frank Catania	17,657	25.5	▲0.8
Democratic	Alfred Steele	15,745	22.8	▼0.8
Republican	Harvey Nutter	10,999	15.9	▼7.0
Unified Independents	Anna N. Taliaferro	1,568	2.3	N/A
Time for Change	James A. Davis, Jr.	1,531	2.2	N/A
Total votes		69,198	100.0	

=== District 36 ===
New Jersey general election, 1993
Party	Candidate	Votes	%	±%
Republican	John V. Kelly	31,127	31.0	▲0.9
Republican	Paul DiGaetano	30,560	30.4	▲0.9
Democratic	Marina C. Perna	19,870	19.8	▼0.4
Democratic	Ozzie Maldonado	18,873	18.8	▼1.4
Total votes		100,430	100.0	

=== District 37 ===
New Jersey general election, 1993
Party	Candidate	Votes	%	±%
Democratic	Loretta Weinberg	33,876	29.9	▲3.8
Democratic	Ken Zisa	33,188	29.3	▲3.4
Republican	John Abraham	23,562	20.8	▼2.1
Republican	David Grobow Hahn	22,550	19.9	▼2.3
Total votes		113,176	100.0	

=== District 38 ===
New Jersey general election, 1993
Party	Candidate	Votes	%	±%
Republican	Patrick J. Roma	40,523	32.2	▲0.2
Republican	Rose Marie Heck	38,388	30.5	▲1.9
Democratic	Frank Biasco	23,665	18.8	▼1.1
Democratic	Robert Burns	23,292	18.5	▼1.0
Total votes		125,868	100.0	

=== District 39 ===
New Jersey general election, 1993
Party	Candidate	Votes	%	±%
Republican	Charlotte Vandervalk	49,531	32.9	▼8.8
Republican	John E. Rooney	47,593	31.6	▼6.7
Democratic	Mary R. Smith	27,869	18.5	▲1.5
Democratic	Donald W. Becker	25,057	16.6	N/A
Populist	Patricia Rainsford	537	0.4	▼1.1
Total votes		150,587	100.0	

=== District 40 ===
New Jersey general election, 1993
Party	Candidate	Votes	%	±%
Republican	Nicholas R. Felice	49,340	35.0	▼3.3
Republican	David C. Russo	48,200	34.2	▼3.2
Democratic	Jack Dabney	22,167	15.7	▲3.4
Democratic	Barry Winston	21,316	15.1	▲3.1
Total votes		141,023	100.0	

== See also ==
- 1993 New Jersey Senate election
