= Verlina Reynolds-Jackson =

Member of the New Jersey General Assembly

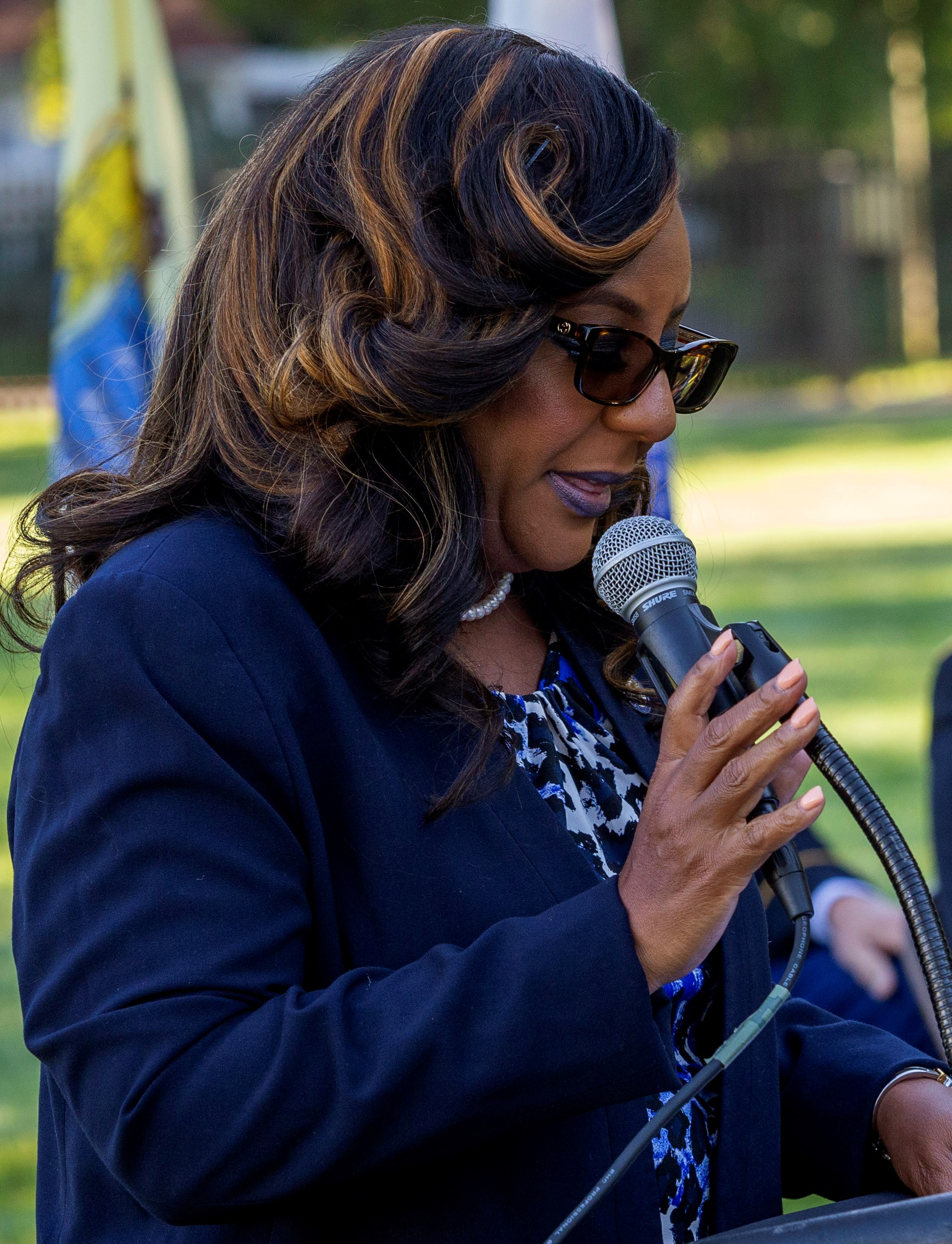

Member of the New Jersey General Assembly from the 15th district
- Incumbent
- Assumed office February 15, 2018 Serving with Anthony Verrelli
- Preceded by: Elizabeth Maher Muoio

Personal details
- Born: July 26, 1971 (age 55)
- Party: Democratic
- Spouse: Lorenzo Jackson
- Education: College of New Jersey (BA); Central Michigan University (MS)
- Website: Campaign website State Assembly website

Verlina Reynolds-Jackson (born July 26, 1971) is an American social worker and Democratic Party politician who has represented the 15th Legislative District in the New Jersey General Assembly since 2018, and is now in her fourth term. She served in the Assembly as the Deputy Majority Leader from 2020 to 2021, and has been the Constituent Outreach Chair, Chair of the Education Committee, Co-Chair of the Joint Committee on Public Schools, and Vice Chair of the Assembly Appropriations Committee.

Previously, she was a member of the Trenton City Council from 2010 to 2018, during which time she ultimately served as Council President.

Reynolds-Jackson entered the 2026 Democratic primary for New Jersey's 12th congressional district, coming in fifth and losing to crisis doctor Adam Hamawy.

== Early life ==
Reynolds-Jackson is a lifelong Trenton, New Jersey, resident, the daughter of a Vietnam War veteran father and a mother who was a typist in the Attorney General's office. She attended Trenton Central High School. She graduated from Trenton State College (now The College of New Jersey) with a bachelor's degree in Sociology, and from Central Michigan University with a Master of Science in administration.

Reynolds-Jackson has worked for the New Jersey Department of Community Affairs in its Division of Housing, and for the Mercer County Board of Social Services as a social worker.

== Trenton City Council (2010–18) ==
First elected to the Trenton City Council in 2010, as the first Black woman to represent Trenton's East Ward Council, Reynolds-Jackson was re-elected to a second term in office to represent the ward for a four-year term running from July 1, 2014, through June 30, 2018, after she received 42% of the votes cast in the ward while she was one of three candidates running for the seat. As a Democratic county committee member, she was involved in political campaigns across Mercer County in 2016 and 2017. She was elected by her peers in October 2014 to serve as the City Council's vice president, though two councilmembers voted against the appointment, claiming that the position of vice president had been created improperly. She ultimately became Council President.

== New Jersey Assembly (2018–present) ==
Reynolds-Jackson is serving in her fourth term as Assemblywoman for NJ-15.

In January 2018, New Jersey Assemblywoman Elizabeth Maher Muoio, representing the 15th Legislative District, was nominated by Governor of New Jersey Phil Murphy to serve as the Treasurer of New Jersey. She resigned from the Assembly effective January 15, 2018, to begin work in the executive branch; her resignation came less than a week after she was sworn into office.

Reynolds-Jackson was chosen at a February 10, 2018, Democratic county convention from Mercer County and Hunterdon County to succeed Muoioas as New Jersey Assemblywoman until a November 2018 special election. In the second round of voting in the general election for the New Jersey Assembly, Reynolds-Jackson received a majority of the votes cast by committee members, defeating Mercer County Freeholder Anthony Verrelli. She served in the Assembly as the Deputy Majority Leader from 2020 to 2021, and has been the Constituent Outreach Chair since 2022.

As an Assemblywoman, she was the main sponsor of a bill requiring Immigration and Customs Enforcement (ICE) agents to not wear the masks, which Governor Mikie Sherrill signed. She pushed a voting rights bill, and education bills.

In 2020, she was one of the primary sponsors of New Jersey Assembly Bill 4454 (now N.J.S.A. 18A:35-4.36a) which requires a curriculum on diversity and inclusion to be a component of the school curriculum for students in kindergarten through twelfth grade.

In January 2024, during a debate on a bill to increase legislators' salaries, Assemblyman Brian Bergen asserted that legislators were "doing quite well" based on the cars with Assembly member license plates he saw in the New Jersey State House parking lot, to which Reynolds-Jackson responded that she drives a 2007 Toyota Camry.

=== Committee assignments ===
As of 2026, she served as Assembly Chair of the Education Committee, Constituent Outreach Chair, Co-Chair of the Joint Committee on Public Schools, and Vice Chair of the Appropriations Committee.

=== District 15 ===
Each of the 40 districts in the New Jersey Legislature has one representative in the New Jersey Senate and two members in the New Jersey General Assembly. The representatives from the 15th District for the 2024—2025 Legislative Session were:

- Senator Shirley Turner (D)
- Assemblywoman Verlina Reynolds-Jackson (D)
- Assemblyman Anthony Verrelli (D)

== 2026 U.S. House of Representatives New Jersey Democratic primary ==
Reynolds-Jackson entered the 2026 Democratic primary for New Jersey's 12th congressional district to succeed Congresswoman Bonnie Watson Coleman, after Watson Coleman announced her retirement.

Reynolds-Jackson has focused on her desire to improve healthcare access, affordability, public education, and criminal justice reform, and spotlighted her legislative experience.

She has received endorsements from state legislators Wayne DeAngelo, state assemblymember from the 14th district (2008–present), Shirley Turner, president pro tempore of the New Jersey Senate (2002–2010, 2024–present) from the 15th district (1998–present), and Anthony Verrelli, state assemblymember from the 15th district (2018–present). She has also been endorsed by local officials Dan Benson, Mercer County Executive (2024–present) and Reed Gusciora, mayor of Trenton (2018–present).

Labor unions that have endorsed her include the Communications Workers of America District 1, and the Eastern Atlantic States Regional Council of Carpenters. In addition, she has been endorsed by the Mercer County Democratic Committee.

Reynolds-Jackson came fifth in the final results with 8.9% of the vote, with the primary's winner being Adam Hamawy with 28.1%.

== Electoral history ==
15th Legislative District General Election, 2023
Party	Candidate	Votes	%
Democratic	Anthony S. Verrelli (incumbent)	27,669	42.3
Democratic	Verlina Reynolds-Jackson (incumbent)	27,322	41.8
Republican	Michel F. Hurtado	10,371	15.9
Total votes		65,362	100.0
Democratic hold			
Democratic hold			

15th legislative district general election, 2021
Party	Candidate	Votes	%
Democratic	Anthony S. Verrelli (incumbent)	37,507	40.66%
Democratic	Verlina Reynolds-Jackson (incumbent)	37,214	40.34%
Republican	Patricia "Pat" A. Johnson	15,492	16.79%
Vote For Pedro	Pedro M. Reyes	2,042	2.21%
Total votes		92,255	100.0
Democratic hold			

15th Legislative District General Election, 2019
Party	Candidate	Votes	%
Democratic	Verlina Reynolds-Jackson (incumbent)	22,742	39.01%
Democratic	Anthony Verrelli (incumbent)	22,141	37.98%
Republican	Jennifer Williams	9,426	16.17%
Legalize Marijuana Party	Edward Forchion	2,447	4.2%
Legalize Marijuana Party	Dioh Williams	1,541	2.64%
Total votes		58,297	100%
Democratic hold			

15th Legislative District special Election, 2018
Party	Candidate	Votes	%
Democratic	Verlina Reynolds-Jackson (incumbent)		36.0%
Democratic	Anthony Verrelli (incumbent)		35.75%
Republican	Tracy Sinatra		13.2%
Republican	Justin Tibbetts		12.75%
Integrity, Transparency, Accountability	Alex Bethea		1.5%
Legalize Marijuana Party	Edward Forchion		0.8%
Total votes			100%
Democratic hold			
