= Anthony Verrelli =

Member of the New Jersey General Assembly

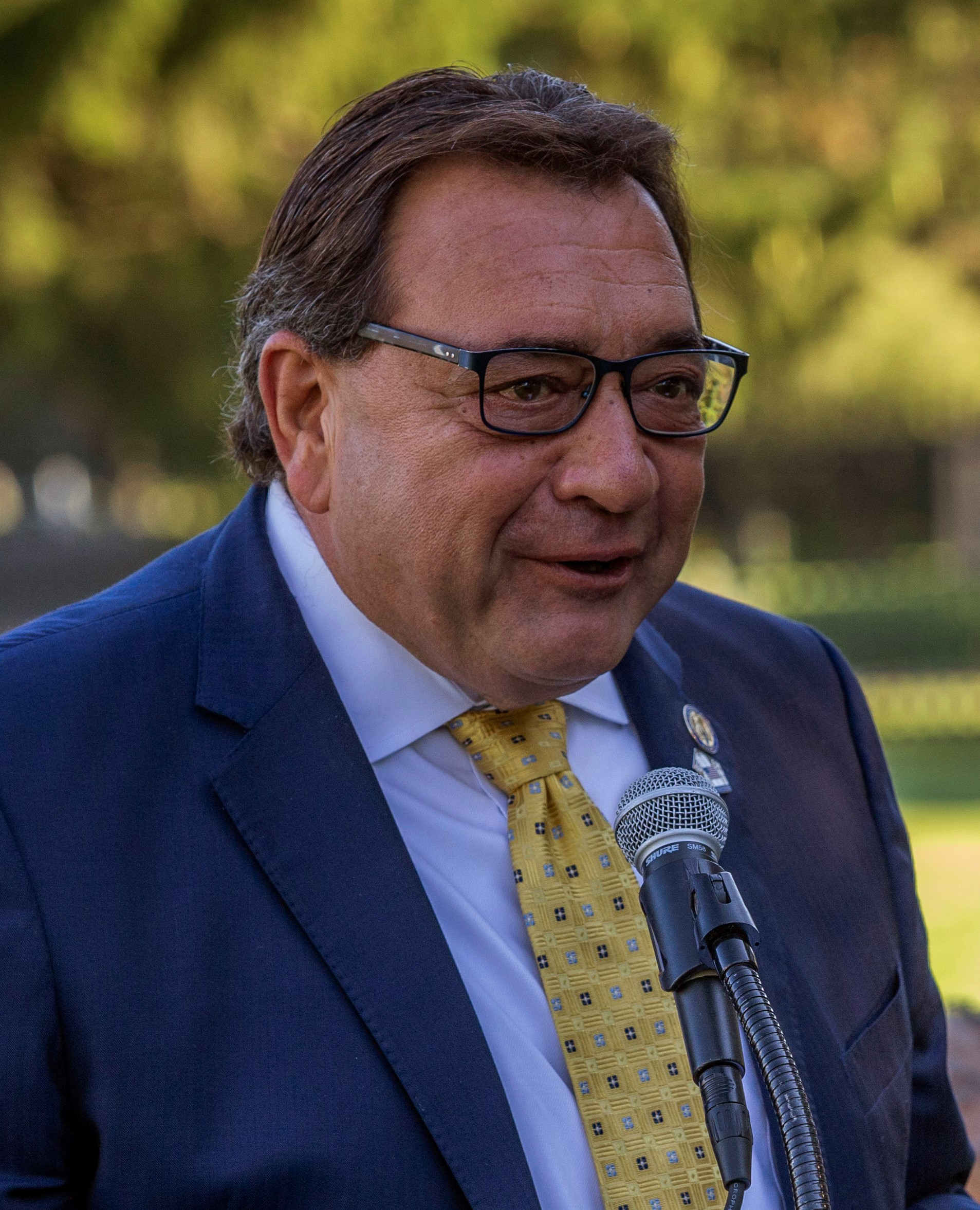

Member of the New Jersey General Assembly from the 15th district
- Incumbent
- Assumed office August 5, 2018 Serving with Verlina Reynolds-Jackson
- Preceded by: Reed Gusciora

Member of the Mercer County Board of Chosen Freeholders
- In office January 1, 2017 – August 5, 2018
- Preceded by: Anthony Carabelli
- Succeeded by: Nina Melker

Personal details
- Born: January 6, 1964 (age 62) Trenton, New Jersey, U.S.
- Party: Democratic
- Education: Notre Dame High School
- Occupation: Carpenter and union leader
- Website: Legislative Webpage

Anthony S. Verrelli (born January 6, 1964) is an American carpenter, union leader and Democratic Party politician who represents the 15th Legislative District in the New Jersey General Assembly.

== Early life ==
Born in Trenton, he grew up in Lawrence Township where he attended Notre Dame High School. He became a carpenter and active union member, eventually becoming President of Carpenters Local Union 254. He has previously lived in Ewing Township and served on the township zoning board, in addition to other county-wide advisory boards. Currently a resident of Hopewell Township, Mercer County, New Jersey, Verrelli was elected to the Mercer County Board of Chosen Freeholders in 2016 succeeding long-time freeholder Anthony Carabelli and resigned from that position after being selected to fill the vacant seat in the Assembly.

== New Jersey Assembly ==
Previously a member of the Mercer County Board of Chosen Freeholders, Verrelli was sworn into office on August 5, 2018, to succeed Reed Gusciora, who left office after being sworn in to serve as Mayor of Trenton, New Jersey.

In 2020, he was one of the primary sponsors of Assembly Bill 4454 (now N.J.S.A. 18A:35-4.36a) which requires a curriculum on diversity and inclusion to be included in the school curriculum for students in kindergarten through twelfth grade.

=== Committees ===
Committee assignments for the current session are:

- Labor, Chair
- Public Safety and Preparedness, Vice-Chair
- Health

=== District 15 ===
Each of the 40 districts in the New Jersey Legislature has one representative in the New Jersey Senate and two members in the New Jersey General Assembly. The representatives from the 15th District for the 2026—2027 Legislative Session are:

- Senator Shirley Turner (D)
- Assemblywoman Verlina Reynolds-Jackson (D)
- Assemblyman Anthony Verrelli (D)

== Electoral history ==
15th Legislative District General Election, 2023
Party	Candidate	Votes	%
Democratic	Anthony S. Verrelli (incumbent)	27,669	42.3
Democratic	Verlina Reynolds-Jackson (incumbent)	27,322	41.8
Republican	Michel F. Hurtado	10,371	15.9
Total votes		65,362	100.0
Democratic hold			
Democratic hold			

15th legislative district general election, 2021
Party	Candidate	Votes	%
Democratic	Anthony S. Verrelli (incumbent)	37,507	40.66%
Democratic	Verlina Reynolds-Jackson (incumbent)	37,214	40.34%
Republican	Patricia "Pat" A. Johnson	15,492	16.79%
Vote For Pedro	Pedro M. Reyes	2,042	2.21%
Total votes		92,255	100.0
Democratic hold			

15th Legislative District General Election, 2019
Party	Candidate	Votes	%
Democratic	Verlina Reynolds-Jackson (incumbent)	22,742	39.01%
Democratic	Anthony Verrelli (incumbent)	22,141	37.98%
Republican	Jennifer Williams	9,426	16.17%
Legalize Marijuana Party	Edward Forchion	2,447	4.2%
Legalize Marijuana Party	Dioh Williams	1,541	2.64%
Total votes		58,297	100%
Democratic hold			

15th Legislative District special Election, 2018
Party	Candidate	Votes	%
Democratic	Verlina Reynolds-Jackson (incumbent)		36.0%
Democratic	Anthony Verrelli (incumbent)		35.75%
Republican	Tracy Sinatra		13.2%
Republican	Justin Tibbetts		12.75%
Integrity, Transparency, Accountability	Alex Bethea		1.5%
Legalize Marijuana Party	Edward Forchion		0.8%
Total votes			100%
Democratic hold			

New Jersey General Assembly
Preceded by Reed Gusciora	Member-elect of the New Jersey General Assembly for the 15th District; August 5, 2018–present With: Verlina Reynolds-Jackson	Succeeded by Incumbent
