= Donald J. Albanese =

American Republican Party politician

Member of the New Jersey General Assembly from the 15th district
- In office January 13, 1976 – January 12, 1982
- Preceded by: Robert C. Shelton Jr.
- Succeeded by: Gerard S. Naples; John S. Watson

Personal details
- Born: June 26, 1937 (age 89) Belvidere, New Jersey
- Party: Republican
- Spouse: Rosemarie Falcone (m. 1970; died 2017)

Donald J. Albanese (born June 26, 1937) is an American Republican Party politician who served in the New Jersey General Assembly from 1976 to 1982.

== Biography ==
Born in Belvidere, he attended public schools there and later graduated from Rider College in 1960. He also attended classes at George Washington University, Lehigh University Graduate School of Business, and New York Institute of Finance. Albanese served in the Office of Naval Intelligence from 1955 to 1957. A certified public accountant by trade, Albanese lived in Lopatcong Township near Phillipsburg where he maintained an accountant's office. Albanese later moved to Bangor, Pennsylvania. He was married to the former Rosemarie Falcone, a businesswoman who also served on various women's Republican committees, a vice-chair of the Warren County Republican Committee, and was an unsuccessful Democratic nominee for the General Assembly in the 23rd District in 1991. She died in 2017.

== Political career ==
From 1963 to 1969, he served as the president of the Board of Education of the Belvidere School District. He also served as the chair of the Belvidere Republican Committee in 1968, and the Lopatcong Township Republican Committee in 1974. He first ran for the General Assembly in 1967 in the new 15th Legislative District stretching through Hunterdon, Warren, and Sussex counties. However, he was defeated for one of two seats in the Republican primary. In 1975, Albanese made a second attempt for the Assembly in the Republican Primary in the 15th District (this time encompassing Warren and Sussex counties and northern Passaic County). He was again defeated (coming in third place) but one of two winners, Clifton E. Lawrence, died between the primary and general election. Albanese was ultimately placed on the Republican ticket and won the election alongside incumbent Robert Littell. He was subsequently reelected in 1977 and 1979.

While in the legislature, he served on the Assembly taxation committee and was vice chairman on the Joint Legislative Ethics Committee. Albanese compiled a conservative voting record, voting against implementing the state income tax and public financing of gubernatorial elections. He was an early supporter of Ronald Reagan's presidential bid and earned a 100-percent rating from the American Conservative Union (ACU). He was also a member of the ACU and the American Legislative Exchange Council. In 1980, he was a delegate to the Republican National Convention and was later appointed by Reagan following his election to the presidency to the National Steering Committee on Business and the Citizens for America Committee.

He first considered a run for Governor of New Jersey in 1981. Later, he dropped out of the Republican gubernatorial primary and instead challenged incumbent State Senator Wayne Dumont in the Republican primary in the redistricted 24th district. Dumont defeated Albanese 60%–40%. Following his move to Pennsylvania, he ran for the Pennsylvania House of Representatives in District 137's 2010 Republican primary. Albanese was defeated by eventual general election winner Joe Emrick.
