= Joseph Yuhas =

American politician

Member of the New Jersey General Assembly from the 15th district
- In office January 11, 1994 – January 9, 1996 Serving with Shirley Turner
- Preceded by: John S. Watson; John W. Hartmann
- Succeeded by: Reed Gusciora

Personal details
- Born: July 19, 1956 (age 70) Trenton, New Jersey
- Party: Democratic

Joseph Yuhas (born July 19, 1956) is an American politician who served in the New Jersey General Assembly from the 15th Legislative District from 1994 to 1996.
