= Gerard S. Naples =

American politician (1937–2018)

Member of the New Jersey General Assembly from the 15th Legislative District
- In office January 12, 1982 – January 14, 1992
- Preceded by: Donald J. Albanese; Robert Littell
- Succeeded by: John W. Hartmann

Personal details
- Born: September 10, 1937 Trenton, New Jersey
- Died: April 9, 2018 (aged 80) Trenton, New Jersey
- Party: Democratic

Gerard S. Naples (September 10, 1937 – April 9, 2018) was an American politician who served in the New Jersey General Assembly as a Democrat from the 15th Legislative District from 1982 to 1992. A lifelong resident of Trenton, he graduated from Trenton Junior College (now Mercer County Community College), Rider College, and Trenton State College (now The College of New Jersey) earning various degrees in education-related fields. While in the Assembly, he was chair of the Assembly Education Committee and vice-chair of the Joint New Jersey Senate–Assembly Committee on Public Schools.

In the 1991 general election for the Assembly, Naples lost his seat coming in fourth place behind fellow incumbent Democrat John S. Watson and Republican challengers John W. Hartmann and Channell Wilkins. He died on April 9, 2018, in Trenton at the age of 80.
