= Robert Shelton =

Robert Shelton may refer to:

- Robert Shelton (critic) (1926–1995), music and film critic
- Robert Shelton (Ku Klux Klan) (1929–2003), Grand Wizard of United Klans of America
- Robert N. Shelton (born 1948), former President of the University of Arizona and current director of the Fiesta Bowl
- Robert C. Shelton Jr. (1934–2023), American politician in the New Jersey General Assembly
- Bob Shelton of The Shelton Brothers, musician

== See also ==
- Robert Sheldon (disambiguation)
