= John W. Hartmann =

American politician

Member of the New Jersey General Assembly from the 15th district
- In office January 14, 1992 – January 11, 1994
- Preceded by: Gerard S. Naples
- Succeeded by: Shirley Turner; Joseph Yuhas

Personal details
- Born: September 22, 1967 (age 59) Toronto, Ontario, Canada
- Party: Republican
- Education: Georgetown University (BA); Seton Hall University (JD)

John W. Hartmann (born September 22, 1967) is an American politician who served in the New Jersey General Assembly from the 15th Legislative District from 1992 to 1994.

== New Jersey Assembly ==
Born in Toronto, Hartmann attended Princeton Day School and graduated from Georgetown University in 1989 with a Bachelor's degree, where he majored in history and was an honors student. He received his Juris Doctor from Seton Hall University School of Law in 1993.

A resident of West Windsor, New Jersey and attending law school, Hartmann ran for the New Jersey General Assembly in 1991 for the 15th legislative district. In the 1991 general election for the Assembly, incumbent assemblyman Gerard Naples lost his seat coming in fourth place behind fellow incumbent Democrat John S. Watson and Hartmann. Hartmann's running mate took third place, leaving Hartmann and Watson as the winning candidates. Hartmann won along fellow Republican Dick LaRossa, who would serve in the New Jersey Senate. Elected at age 24, this made Hartmann the youngest Republican elected to the Assembly in state history. Hartmann would serve one term in the Assembly before being succeeded by Joseph Yuhas in 1994.
