= New Jersey's 15th legislative district =

American legislative district

- Senator: Shirley Turner (D)
- Assembly members: Verlina Reynolds-Jackson (D); Anthony Verrelli (D)
- Registration: 46.98% Democratic; 15.51% Republican; 36.21% unaffiliated
- Demographics: 38.7% White; 25.7% Black/African American; 0.8% Native American; 11.8% Asian; 0.1% Hawaiian/Pacific Islander; 14.7% Other race; 8.3% Two or more races; 23.7% Hispanic
- Population: 224,002
- Voting-age population: 174,477
- Registered voters: 149,156

New Jersey's 15th legislative district is one of 40 in the New Jersey Legislature, covering the Hunterdon County municipalities of Delaware Township, East Amwell Township, Frenchtown, Kingwood, Lambertville City, Stockton, and West Amwell Township; and the Mercer County municipalities of Ewing Township, Hopewell Borough, Hopewell Township, Lawrence Township, Pennington Borough, Trenton City and West Windsor Township.

== Demographic characteristics ==
As of the 2020 United States census, the district had a population of 224,002, of whom 174,477 (77.9%) were of voting age. The racial makeup of the district was 86,762 (38.7%) White, 57,461 (25.7%) African American, 1,700 (0.8%) Native American, 26,345 (11.8%) Asian, 139 (0.1%) Pacific Islander, 32,929 (14.7%) from some other race, and 18,666 (8.3%) from two or more races. Hispanic or Latino of any race were 53,100 (23.7%) of the population.

The district had 161,759 registered voters as of February 1, 2025, of whom 59,691 (36.9%) were registered as unaffiliated, 75,232 (46.5%) were registered as Democrats, 24,639 (15.2%) were registered as Republicans, and 1,997 (1.2%) were registered to other parties.

The district includes New Jersey's capital, Trenton and a number of its comparatively wealthier suburbs to the north. The district has the smallest population of any district in the state, and has a comparatively higher percentage of African-American residents and a notable percentage of children in the Temporary Assistance for Needy Families program. Registered Democrats outnumber Republicans by an almost 3 to 1 margin.

== Political representation ==
For the 2026–2027 session, the 15th legislative district of the New Jersey Legislature is represented in the State Senate by Shirley Turner (D, Lawrence Township) and in the General Assembly by Verlina Reynolds-Jackson (D, Trenton) and Anthony Verrelli (D, Hopewell Township).

It overlaps with New Jersey's 7th and 12th congressional districts.

== 1967–1973 ==
In the interim period after the 1964 Supreme Court decision Reynolds v. Sims which required the creation of state legislature districts to be made as equal in population as possible and the 1973 creation of the 40-district map, the 15th district was based in the rural northwestern counties of the state. In the 1967 and 1969 elections, the district consisted of all of Hunterdon, Warren, and Sussex counties which sent one senator and two Assembly members to the legislature, elected at-large. For the 1971 election, the district was made up of only Warren and Sussex counties, again electing one senator and two Assembly members. Republican Wayne Dumont won both Senate elections for the 15th district in this period. In the Assembly elections, Republican Robert Littell won one seat in each of the three Assembly elections in the 15th district. Incumbent Republican assemblyman from Hunterdon County Douglas E. Gimson won re-election to the assembly in 1967 from this district but died on May 15, 1969. Republicans chose Walter E. Foran to be the other Republican candidate in 1969's general election resulting in a lawsuit from third-place finisher Walter C. Keogh-Dwyer. Foran was elected to the other seat in 1969 and served one term until his home county was moved to the 6th district in 1971. Keogh-Dwyer sought election to the Assembly again in 1971 but was successful in this election.

== Election history since 1973 ==
In the 40-district legislative map created in 1973, the 15th district consisted of all of Warren and Sussex counties and West Milford and Ringwood in Passaic County. With the exception of the district electing one Democrat to the assembly in the 1973 general election, the district had been solidly Republican until 1982. When redistricting following the 1980 United States census shifted the district to the Trenton area, the 15th district became a strongly Democratic district. The new 15th district consisted of Trenton, Ewing, Lawrence Township, West Windsor, Princeton Township and Princeton Borough. The 1981 elections brought in Democrats Gerald R. Stockman in the Senate, along with Gerard S. Naples and John S. Watson in the Assembly. The trio remained together in office for a decade.

No changes were made to the district boundaries following the 1990 census and 1991 redistricting. New Jersey Lottery television host Dick LaRossa ran as a Republican in 1991, having registered with the party only five days before that year's filing deadline. He defeated incumbent Gerald R. Stockman by a narrow 50.9%-49.1% margin. His Republican running mate John W. Hartmann knocked off Naples, while Democrat Watson was narrowly re-elected to a sixth term in office. Hartmann, a 24-year-old student at the Seton Hall University School of Law, became the youngest Republican ever elected to the assembly.

In the 1993 elections, Democrats sought to recoup their losses suffered in the 1991 Republican landslide. In the Assembly, Shirley Turner and Joseph Yuhas ran for office, winning back Hartmann's seat from the Republicans. LaRossa faced Stockman for a second time in 1993, with the incumbent receiving endorsements from the AFL-CIO, locals of the Communication Workers of America and the New Jersey State Patrolmen's Benevolent Association. LaRossa won re-election despite the challenge. Yuhas stepped down after a single term in office and was replaced on the ballot in 1995 by Reed Gusciora. In the next election, Turner defeated LaRossa in the Senate election while Bonnie Watson Coleman replaced her in the Assembly.

Following the 2000 census and the 2001 legislative redistricting, West Windsor was shifted to the 14th district but added were Hopewell Township and its two enclave boroughs, Pennington and Hopewell. This addition led to longtime Republican legislator and Pennington resident William E. Schluter to retire from the state senate and run as an independent in the gubernatorial election that year. For the entire decade, Turner, Gusciora, and Watson Coleman were all reelected to their seats. In the 2011 redistricting, the 15th regained West Windsor and picked up East Amwell, West Amwell, and Lambertville in Hunterdon County, but lost the Princetons to the Republican-leaning 16th district. Gusciora, then a Princeton Township resident, moved to a house in Trenton to continue representing the district. The trio were elected twice more but Watson Coleman was elected to Congress in 2014. To replace Watson Coleman, Mercer and Hunterdon County Democrats chose Mercer County Democratic Party Chair and former Freeholder Elizabeth Maher Muoio.

Muoio was nominated by Governor Phil Murphy to serve as the Treasurer of New Jersey. She resigned from office effective January 15, 2018, as well as from her position as director of economic development for Mercer County in order to begin work in the executive branch, in advance of her April 12 confirmation by the New Jersey Senate; her resignation came less than a week after being sworn into office for her second full term in the Assembly. Trenton Councilwoman and Mercer County Democratic Committee chair Verlina Reynolds-Jackson was chosen at a February 10 convention on the second ballot from a field of three candidates to succeed Muoio until a November 2018 special election, and was sworn in on February 15.

Gusciora was elected Mayor of Trenton on June 12, 2018. Prior to being sworn in, he resigned from the Assembly on June 30. Mercer County Freeholder Anthony Verrelli, who finished runner-up to Reynolds-Jackson at the previous convention, was chosen at a special convention held on July 26 on the second ballot from a field of four candidates to fill Gusciora's seat; he was sworn in on August 6. Both Reynolds-Jackson and Verrelli competed in a November 2018 special election to complete the unexpired terms.

== Election history ==
Session	Senate	General Assembly	
1974–1975	Wayne Dumont (R)	Robert C. Shelton Jr. (D)	Robert Littell (R)
1976–1977	Wayne Dumont (R)	Donald J. Albanese (R)	Robert Littell (R)
1978–1979	Wayne Dumont (R)	Donald J. Albanese (R)	Robert Littell (R)
1980–1981	Wayne Dumont (R)	Donald J. Albanese (R)	Robert Littell (R)
1982–1983	Gerald R. Stockman (D)	Gerard S. Naples (D)	John S. Watson (D)
1984–1985	Gerald R. Stockman (D)	Gerard S. Naples (D)	John S. Watson (D)
1986–1987	Gerald R. Stockman (D)	Gerard S. Naples (D)	John S. Watson (D)
1988–1989	Gerald R. Stockman (D)	Gerard S. Naples (D)	John S. Watson (D)
1990–1991	Gerald R. Stockman (D)	Gerard S. Naples (D)	John S. Watson (D)
1992–1993	Dick LaRossa (R)	John W. Hartmann (R)	John S. Watson (D)
1994–1995	Dick LaRossa (R)	Joseph Yuhas (D)	Shirley Turner (D)
1996–1997	Dick LaRossa (R)	Reed Gusciora (D)	Shirley Turner (D)
1998–1999	Shirley Turner (D)	Reed Gusciora (D)	Bonnie Watson Coleman (D)
2000–2001	Shirley Turner (D)	Reed Gusciora (D)	Bonnie Watson Coleman (D)
2002–2003	Shirley Turner (D)	Reed Gusciora (D)	Bonnie Watson Coleman (D)
2004–2005	Shirley Turner (D)	Reed Gusciora (D)	Bonnie Watson Coleman (D)
2006–2007	Shirley Turner (D)	Reed Gusciora (D)	Bonnie Watson Coleman (D)
2008–2009	Shirley Turner (D)	Reed Gusciora (D)	Bonnie Watson Coleman (D)
2010–2011	Shirley Turner (D)	Reed Gusciora (D)	Bonnie Watson Coleman (D)
2012–2013	Shirley Turner (D)	Reed Gusciora (D)	Bonnie Watson Coleman (D)
2014–2015	Shirley Turner (D)	Reed Gusciora (D)	Bonnie Watson Coleman (D) (Note: Resigned on January 3, 2015, to take seat in U.S. House of Representatives)
2014–2015	Shirley Turner (D)	Reed Gusciora (D)	Elizabeth Maher Muoio (D) (Note: Appointed to the Assembly on February 5, 2015)
2016–2017	Shirley Turner (D)	Reed Gusciora (D)	Elizabeth Maher Muoio (D)
2018–2019	Shirley Turner (D)	Reed Gusciora (D) (Note: Resigned on June 30, 2018 to become Mayor of Trenton)	Elizabeth Maher Muoio (D) (Note: Resigned on January 15, 2018 to become State Treasurer)
2018–2019	Shirley Turner (D)	Reed Gusciora (D)	Verlina Reynolds-Jackson (D) (Note: Appointed to the Assembly on February 15, 2018)
2018–2019	Shirley Turner (D)	Anthony Verrelli (D) (Note: Appointed to the Assembly on August 6, 2018)	Verlina Reynolds-Jackson (D)
2020–2021	Shirley Turner (D)	Anthony Verrelli (D)	Verlina Reynolds-Jackson (D)
2022–2023	Shirley Turner (D)	Anthony Verrelli (D)	Verlina Reynolds-Jackson (D)
2024–2025	Shirley Turner (D)	Anthony Verrelli (D)	Verlina Reynolds-Jackson (D)
2026–2027	Shirley Turner (D)	Anthony Verrelli (D)	Verlina Reynolds-Jackson (D)

== Election results, 1973–present ==
=== Senate ===
2021 New Jersey general election
Party	Candidate	Votes	%	±%
Democratic	Shirley K. Turner	38,627	72.2	▼1.8
Republican	Susan Gaul	14,886	27.8	▲1.8
Total votes		53,513	100.0	

New Jersey general election, 2017
Party	Candidate	Votes	%	±%
Democratic	Shirley K. Turner	36,624	74.0	▲10.7
Republican	Lee Eric Newton	12,839	26.0	▼10.7
Total votes		49,463	100.0	

New Jersey general election, 2013
Party	Candidate	Votes	%	±%
Democratic	Shirley K. Turner	30,250	63.3	▼3.1
Republican	Don Cox	17,507	36.7	▲3.1
Total votes		47,757	100.0	

2011 New Jersey general election
Party	Candidate	Votes	%
Democratic	Shirley K. Turner	21,512	66.4
Republican	Donald J. Cox	10,900	33.6
Total votes		32,412	100.0

2007 New Jersey general election
Party	Candidate	Votes	%	±%
Democratic	Shirley K. Turner	20,100	62.8	▼4.6
Republican	Bob Martin	11,924	37.2	▲4.6
Total votes		32,024	100.0	

2003 New Jersey general election
Party	Candidate	Votes	%	±%
Democratic	Shirley K. Turner	24,053	67.4	▼1.7
Republican	Calvin O. Iszard	11,638	32.6	▲2.9
Total votes		35,691	100.0	

2001 New Jersey general election
Party	Candidate	Votes	%
Democratic	Shirley K. Turner	32,289	69.1
Republican	Norbert E. Donelly	13,871	29.7
Libertarian	Thomas D. Abrams	563	1.2
Total votes		46,723	100.0

1997 New Jersey general election
Party	Candidate	Votes	%	±%
Democratic	Shirley K. Turner	29,995	53.9	▲6.2
Republican	Dick LaRossa	25,630	46.1	▼6.2
Total votes		55,625	100.0	

1993 New Jersey general election
Party	Candidate	Votes	%	±%
Republican	Dick LaRossa	28,311	52.3	▲1.4
Democratic	Gerald R. Stockman	25,814	47.7	▼1.4
Total votes		54,125	100.0	

1991 New Jersey general election
Party	Candidate	Votes	%
Republican	Dick LaRossa	22,465	50.9
Democratic	Gerald R. Stockman	21,672	49.1
Total votes		44,137	100.0

1987 New Jersey general election
Party	Candidate	Votes	%	±%
Democratic	Gerald R. Stockman	29,747	71.0	▲3.7
Republican	Norbert E. Donelly	12,132	29.0	▼3.7
Total votes		41,879	100.0	

1983 New Jersey general election
Party	Candidate	Votes	%	±%
Democratic	Gerald R. Stockman	29,967	67.3	▲10.9
Republican	Robert A. Gladstone	14,543	32.7	▼10.9
Total votes		44,510	100.0	

1981 New Jersey general election
Party	Candidate	Votes	%
Democratic	Gerald R. Stockman	30,243	56.4
Republican	Carmen J. Armenti	23,410	43.6
Total votes		53,653	100.0

1977 New Jersey general election
Party	Candidate	Votes	%	±%
Republican	Wayne Dumont, Jr.	35,268	60.7	▲5.7
Democratic	Joseph J. Keslo	22,815	39.3	▼5.7
Total votes		58,083	100.0	

1973 New Jersey general election
Party	Candidate	Votes	%
Republican	Wayne Dumont, Jr.	29,861	55.0
Democratic	Martin F. Murphy	24,445	45.0
Total votes		54,306	100.0

=== General Assembly ===
2021 New Jersey general election
Party	Candidate	Votes	%	±%
Democratic	Anthony S. Verrelli	37,507	40.7	▲2.7
Democratic	Verlina Reynolds-Jackson	37,214	40.3	▲1.1
Republican	Patricia "Pat" A. Johnson	15,492	16.8	▲0.8
Vote For Pedro	Pedro M. Reyes	2,042	2.2	N/A
Total votes		92,255	100.0	

2019 New Jersey general election
Party	Candidate	Votes	%	±%
Democratic	Verlina Reynolds-Jackson	23,715	39.2	▲2.2
Democratic	Anthony S. Verrelli	23,029	38.0	▲1.6
Republican	Jennifer Williams	9,698	16.0	▲2.4
Legalize Marijuana	Edward “NJ Weedman” Forchion	2,537	4.2	N/A
Legalize Marijuana	Dioh Williams	1,593	2.6	N/A
Total votes		60,572	100.0	

Special election, November 6, 2018
Party	Candidate	Votes	%
Democratic	Anthony Verrelli	48,404	71.5
Republican	Justin Tibbetts	17,230	25.5
Integrity Transparency Accountability	Alex Bethea	2,044	3.0
Total votes		67,678	100.0

Special election, November 6, 2018
Party	Candidate	Votes	%
Democratic	Verlina Reynolds-Jackson	49,294	72.0
Republican	Tracy R. Sinatra	18,061	26.4
Repeal Bail Reform	Edward Forchion	1,107	1.6
Total votes		68,462	100.0

New Jersey general election, 2017
Party	Candidate	Votes	%	±%
Democratic	Reed Gusciora	35,481	37.0	▲1.2
Democratic	Elizabeth Maher Muoio	34,937	36.4	▲2.3
Republican	Emily Rich	13,077	13.6	▼1.6
Republican	Rimma Yakobovich	12,428	13.0	▼1.9
Total votes		95,923	100.0	

New Jersey general election, 2015
Party	Candidate	Votes	%	±%
Democratic	Reed Gusciora	17,657	35.8	▲4.7
Democratic	Elizabeth Maher Muoio	16,845	34.1	▲2.7
Republican	Anthony L. Giordano	7,502	15.2	▼3.6
Republican	Peter Mendonez Jr.	7,345	14.9	▼3.8
Total votes		49,349	100.0	

New Jersey general election, 2013
Party	Candidate	Votes	%	±%
Democratic	Bonnie Watson Coleman	29,109	31.4	▼1.4
Democratic	Reed Gusciora	28,848	31.1	▼1.4
Republican	Anthony Giordano	17,429	18.8	▲1.4
Republican	Kim Taylor	17,310	18.7	▲1.4
Total votes		92,696	100.0	

New Jersey general election, 2011
Party	Candidate	Votes	%
Democratic	Bonnie Watson Coleman	20,505	32.8
Democratic	Reed Gusciora	20,350	32.5
Republican	Kathy Kilcommons	10,914	17.4
Republican	Peter M. Yull	10,817	17.3
Total votes		62,586	100.0

New Jersey general election, 2009
Party	Candidate	Votes	%	±%
Democratic	Bonnie Watson Coleman	29,713	32.7	▲0.7
Democratic	Reed Gusciora	29,215	32.1	▲0.9
Republican	Kim Taylor	15,418	17.0	▼0.1
Republican	Werner Graf	14,781	16.3	▼0.6
Libertarian	Daryl Mikell Brooks	939	1.0	N/A
Libertarian	Charles Green	884	1.0	N/A
Total votes		90,950	100.0	

New Jersey general election, 2007
Party	Candidate	Votes	%	±%
Democratic	Bonnie Watson Coleman	19,619	32.0	▼2.7
Democratic	Reed Gusciora	19,096	31.2	▼2.3
Republican	Norbert E. Donelly	10,489	17.1	▲0.9
Republican	Sylvester Bobby Bryant	10,331	16.9	▲1.4
Green	Nicholas Mellis	1,686	2.8	N/A
Total votes		61,221	100.0	

New Jersey general election, 2005
Party	Candidate	Votes	%	±%
Democratic	Bonnie Watson Coleman	31,929	34.7	▲3.6
Democratic	Reed Gusciora	30,773	33.5	▲3.7
Republican	Robert McCready	14,932	16.2	▼1.5
Republican	Tom Mavis	14,280	15.5	▼1.7
Total votes		91,914	100.0	

New Jersey general election, 2003
Party	Candidate	Votes	%	±%
Democratic	Bonnie Watson Coleman	21,550	31.1	▼2.9
Democratic	Reed Gusciora	20,639	29.8	▼3.8
Republican	Brian McKeon	12,239	17.7	▲1.5
Republican	Donald Addison	11,914	17.2	▲1.7
Green	Jill Penn	1,504	2.2	N/A
Green	Russell Cullen	1,358	2.0	N/A
Total votes		69,204	100.0	

New Jersey general election, 2001
Party	Candidate	Votes	%
Democratic	Bonnie Watson Coleman	30,816	34.0
Democratic	Reed Gusciora	30,505	33.6
Republican	Thomas Dallessio	14,657	16.2
Republican	Rosanna Dovgala	14,076	15.5
Libertarian	Christopher C. Toto	616	0.7
Total votes		90,670	100.0

New Jersey general election, 1999
Party	Candidate	Votes	%	±%
Democratic	Bonnie Watson Coleman	21,465	32.7	▲0.5
Democratic	Reed Gusciora	21,309	32.5	▲2.0
Republican	Sidney Goldfarb, M.D.	11,505	17.5	▼2.3
Republican	Sheldon Leitner	10,422	15.9	▼1.6
Conservative	Len Grzywacz	948	1.4	N/A
Total votes		65,649	100.0	

New Jersey general election, 1997
Party	Candidate	Votes	%	±%
Democratic	Bonnie Watson Coleman	31,976	32.2	▲4.0
Democratic	Reed Gusciora	30,235	30.5	▲4.2
Republican	Wanda Webster Stansbury	19,639	19.8	▼1.1
Republican	Channell Wilkins	17,342	17.5	▼2.5
Total votes		99,192	100.0	

New Jersey general election, 1995
Party	Candidate	Votes	%	±%
Democratic	Shirley K. Turner	20,681	28.2	▲2.5
Democratic	Reed Gusciora	19,294	26.3	▲2.6
Republican	Joe Constance	15,319	20.9	▼2.6
Republican	Gloria S. Teti	14,675	20.0	▲1.0
Conservative	George E. Borchers	1,131	1.5	N/A
Libertarian	Robert D. Figueroa	1,105	1.5	N/A
Conservative	Beverly Kidder	1,029	1.4	N/A
Total votes		73,234	100.0	

New Jersey general election, 1993
Party	Candidate	Votes	%	±%
Democratic	Shirley K. Turner	25,759	25.7	▲4.4
Democratic	Joseph Yuhas	23,714	23.7	▲4.2
Republican	John Hartmann	23,495	23.5	▼1.7
Republican	Donald C. Addison, Jr.	19,062	19.0	▼2.2
Independent	Carl J. Mayer	6,531	6.5	N/A
For the People	Tony Belardo	1,361	1.4	N/A
Constitutional Enforcer	Clinton C. Barlow	235	0.2	N/A
Total votes		100,157	100.0	

1991 New Jersey general election
Party	Candidate	Votes	%
Republican	John Hartmann	22,091	25.2
Democratic	John S. Watson	18,713	21.33
Republican	Channell Wilkins	18,578	21.18
Democratic	Gerard S. Naples	17,081	19.5
Making Government Work	Steven Schlossstein	5,148	5.9
Making Government Work	W. Oliver “Bucky” Leggett	4,655	5.3
Coalition of One	Robert Gunderman	1,448	1.7
Total votes		87,714	100.0

1989 New Jersey general election
Party	Candidate	Votes	%	±%
Democratic	Gerard S. Naples	32,966	33.9	▲0.7
Democratic	John S. Watson	32,398	33.3	▲0.7
Republican	Sharon H. Rousseau	16,005	16.5	▼1.0
Republican	June C. Morreale	15,802	16.3	▼0.4
Total votes		97,171	100.0	

1987 New Jersey general election
Party	Candidate	Votes	%	±%
Democratic	Gerard S. Naples	26,923	33.2	▲5.3
Democratic	John S. Watson	26,484	32.6	▲4.4
Republican	Arthur E. Frank	14,193	17.5	▼4.7
Republican	John S. Furlong	13,596	16.7	▼5.0
Total votes		81,196	100.0	

1985 New Jersey general election
Party	Candidate	Votes	%	±%
Democratic	John S. Watson	25,173	28.2	▼3.0
Democratic	Gerald S. Naples	24,893	27.9	▼3.0
Republican	Barbara Marrow	19,818	22.2	▲3.0
Republican	Mary Ann McKee	19,413	21.7	▲3.0
Total votes		89,297	100.0	

New Jersey general election, 1983
Party	Candidate	Votes	%	±%
Democratic	John S. Watson	27,413	31.2	▲3.7
Democratic	Gerard S. Naples	27,210	30.9	▲3.8
Republican	Joseph P. Teti	16,931	19.2	▼4.4
Republican	Herman W. Hanssler	16,449	18.7	▼3.1
Total votes		88,003	100.0	

New Jersey general election, 1981
Party	Candidate	Votes	%
Democratic	John S. Watson	27,608	27.5
Democratic	Gerard S. Naples	27,270	27.1
Republican	Clifford W. Snedeker	23,720	23.6
Republican	Richard C. Woodbridge	21,916	21.8
Total votes		100,514	100.0

New Jersey general election, 1979
Party	Candidate	Votes	%	±%
Republican	Donald J. Albanese	27,803	33.9	▲2.5
Republican	Robert E. Littell	26,879	32.7	▲4.0
Democratic	David Bogert	12,782	15.6	▼4.8
Democratic	Joseph T. Srholez III	11,022	13.4	▼6.1
Independent	Mary D. Blohm	3,589	4.4	N/A
Total votes		82,075	100.0	

New Jersey general election, 1977
Party	Candidate	Votes	%	±%
Republican	Donald J. Albanese	32,423	31.4	▲6.5
Republican	Robert E. Littell	29,548	28.7	▼0.2
Democratic	George R. Zoffinger	21,051	20.4	▼3.6
Democratic	Paul E. Nagel	20,095	19.5	▼2.7
Total votes		103,117	100.0	

New Jersey general election, 1975
Party	Candidate	Votes	%	±%
Republican	Robert E. Littell	29,126	28.9	▲1.6
Republican	Donald J. Albanese	25,106	24.9	▲1.4
Democratic	Martin F. Murphy	24,141	24.0	▼3.2
Democratic	Peter J. Barry	22,333	22.2	▲0.2
Total votes		100,706	100.0	

New Jersey general election, 1973
Party	Candidate	Votes	%
Republican	Robert E. Littell	28,397	27.3
Democratic	Robert C. Shelton, Jr.	28,254	27.2
Republican	Walter C. Keogh-Dwyer	24,457	23.5
Democratic	Peter Karis	22,882	22.0
Total votes		103,990	100.0

== Election results, 1967–1973 ==
=== Senate ===
1967 New Jersey general election
Party	Candidate	Votes	%
Republican	Wayne Dumont, Jr.	42,292	69.6
Democratic	William R. Stem	18,450	30.4
Total votes		60,742	100.0

1971 New Jersey general election
Party	Candidate	Votes	%
Republican	Wayne Dumont, Jr.	28,041	66.6
Democratic	Richard V. Laddey	14,072	33.4
Total votes		42,113	100.0

=== General Assembly ===
New Jersey general election, 1967
Party	Candidate	Votes	%
Republican	Douglas E. Gimson	37,121	31.8
Republican	Robert E. Littell	36,590	31.4
Democratic	Harold J. Curry	22,710	19.5
Democratic	Raymond C. McPeek	20,209	17.3
Total votes		116,630	100.0

New Jersey general election, 1969
Party	Candidate	Votes	%
Republican	Walter E. Foran	41,445	30.7
Republican	Robert E. Littell	41,177	30.5
Democratic	Barry L. Gardner	26,923	20.0
Democratic	Richard V. Laddey	25,301	18.8
Total votes		134,846	100.0

New Jersey general election, 1971
Party	Candidate	Votes	%
Republican	Robert E. Littell	23,683	29.7
Republican	Walter C. Keogh-Dwyer	20,721	26.0
Democratic	Michael P. Martin	18,480	23.2
Democratic	David H. Clauss	16,816	21.1
Total votes		79,700	100.0
