= Bob Sheldon (disambiguation) =

Bob Sheldon (born 1950) is a former Major League Baseball second baseman.

Robert or Bob Sheldon may also refer to:

- Bob Sheldon (book dealer), American activist and murder victim, founder of Internationalist Books
- Bob Sheldon, a character in The Outsiders
- Robert Sheldon, Baron Sheldon (born 1923), British Labour politician
- Bobby Sheldon (1883–1983), American businessman, government official and politician
- Robert Sheldon (composer) (born 1954), American composer

== See also ==
- Robert Shelton (disambiguation)
