= John S. Watson Institute for Public Policy =

American public policy research institute

Coordinates: 40.2196°N 74.7683°W

The John S. Watson Institute for Public Policy is an American non-partisan research institute on public policy located at Kean University in Union, New Jersey. The Institute is named after New Jersey Assemblyman John S. Watson, the first African American to serve as the state's Chairman of the Assembly Appropriations Committee.

== Purpose ==
Thomas Edison State College established the institute in response to the expressed needs of decision-makers across New Jersey to have a resource for researching public policy. The approach of the institute is to apply the resources of higher education to public policy decisions in a practical and hands-on manner. The institute provides practical research, technical assistance, and other expertise. It supports the capacity of decision-makers to address the most critical issues facing New Jersey. The institute's work is driven by the needs of the decision-makers themselves, not by the internal academic or political agenda of the college.

The Watson Institute places emphasis on developing long-term partnerships rather than short-term consulting relationships. The institute's goal is to support and strengthen partners' ability to address critical issues as they arise, rather than focusing narrowly on a particular crisis or "hot issue" and departing. Abstract, theoretical issues, and policy aftermaths are avoided, with the focus being on forward-looking solutions to practical issues.

== Clients, programs and accomplishments ==
The work at the institute has made various types of progress in the realm of public policy.

- The Healthcare Information Networks and Technologies (HINT) project, a partnership with the New Jersey Department of Health and Senior Services, legislative leaders, and others to improve efficiency and reduce costs for healthcare through appropriate uses of technology.
- Projects to strengthen public schools in New Jersey's communities, including an external audit of the Atlantic City Public Schools, a focus on strengthening parental involvement, and work in support of charter schools and other policy innovations.
- Several urban initiatives, including a partnership with the Urban Mayors Association to provide services to targeted cities, the Center for the Urban Environment, a partnership with the Department of Environmental Protection, and the Trenton Enterprise Coalition-a community collaborative that is part of the New Jersey Governor's Urban Initiative.
- The Center for Leadership Development was established as a new program at the institute that will work to support and strengthen leadership skills among college students through mentoring, development of problem solving skills and immersion in the critical issues facing New Jersey leaders.

In responding to the needs of its partners, the Watson Institute is able to access the best available resources and expertise from across the state and throughout the nation. It is able to use the college's distance learning resources and apply them to the arena of public policy. The institute makes available the academic resources, databases, and analytic tools necessary to support appropriate action and respond to specific needs. This might include research into current "best practices" in a given public policy area, a study by an available expert into the effectiveness of current systems, or the collection and analysis of key data.

The Watson Institute also provides resources other than information to its partners. This includes strategic planning and organizational development assistance, helping to secure financial or volunteer labor resources, publishing and disseminating materials, and other assistance to facilitate effective policy making and action.

The institute enhances its partners' effectiveness by creating linkages and opportunities for collaboration. This can include sponsoring informal discussions between partners, practitioners, other interested parties in specific policy areas. Through these efforts.

Initial support for The Watson Institute came from the college's operating funds, with further funds from major foundations and corporations.
