= Shirley Turner =

Member of the New Jersey Senate

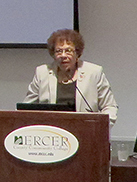

President pro tempore of the New Jersey Senate
- Incumbent
- Assumed office January 9, 2024
- Preceded by: Sandra Bolden Cunningham
- In office January 8, 2002 – January 12, 2010 Serving with Joseph A. Palaia (2002–2004)
- Preceded by: Joseph A. Palaia
- Succeeded by: Nia Gill

Member of the New Jersey Senate from the 15th district
- Incumbent
- Assumed office January 13, 1998
- Preceded by: Dick LaRossa

Member of the New Jersey General Assembly from the 15th district
- In office January 11, 1994 – January 13, 1998
- Preceded by: John W. Hartmann; John Watson
- Succeeded by: Bonnie Watson Coleman

Personal details
- Born: July 3, 1941 (age 84) Dover, New Jersey, U.S.
- Party: Democratic
- Spouse: Donald Turner (died 2024)
- Education: College of New Jersey (BA); Rider University (MA); Rutgers University, New Brunswick (attended)
- Website: State Senate website

Shirley Kersey Turner (born July 3, 1941) is an American Democratic Party politician, who has been serving in the New Jersey State Senate since 1998, where she represents the 15th Legislative District.

== Early life ==
Turner was born in Dover, New Jersey, and graduated from Dover High School in 1960. She received a B.A. from Trenton State College (now The College of New Jersey) in Education and an M.A. from Rider College in Guidance and Counseling, and has done postgraduate work in education at Rutgers University.

Turner resides in the Lawrenceville section of Lawrence Township. Before entering state politics, Senator Turner served on the Mercer County Board of Chosen Freeholders from 1983 to 1986, where she served as Freeholder Vice President. Before being elected to the State Senate, Turner served in New Jersey's lower house, the General Assembly, from 1994 to 1998.

== New Jersey Senate ==
In the 1997 general election, Turner defeated incumbent Republican Dick LaRossa, making him the only Republican Senator to lose his seat. Turner was Senate President Pro Tempore, a position which she has held since 2004 to 2010. She serves in the Senate on the Education Committee (as Chair) and as a member of the Budget and Appropriations Committee. In a 2010 vote on same sex marriage, Turner was one of six Democrats to vote against the bill to legalize it. However, in a 2012 vote on a similar bill, she supported the measure (which would be vetoed by Governor Chris Christie).

=== Committees ===
Committee assignments for the 2024—2025 Legislative Session are:

- Education (as vice-chair)
- Economic Growth (as vice-chair)
- State Government, Wagering, Tourism & Historic Preservation

=== District 15 ===
Each of the 40 districts in the New Jersey Legislature has one representative in the New Jersey Senate and two members in the New Jersey General Assembly. The representatives from the 15th District for the 2024—2025 Legislative Session are:

- Senator Shirley Turner (D)
- Assemblywoman Verlina Reynolds-Jackson (D)
- Assemblyman Anthony Verrelli (D)

== Election history ==
=== Senate ===
15th Legislative District General Election, 2023
| Party | Candidate | Votes | % |
|---|---|---|---|
| Democratic | Shirley K. Turner (incumbent) | 27,760 | 73.2 |
| Republican | Roger R. Locandro | 10,173 | 26.8 |
| Total votes | | 37,933 | 100.0 |
| Democratic hold | | | |

15th Legislative District general election, 2021
| Party | Candidate | Votes | % |
|---|---|---|---|
| Democratic | Shirley K. Turner (incumbent) | 38,627 | 72.18 |
| Republican | Susan Gaul | 14,886 | 27.82 |
| Total votes | | 53,513 | 100.0 |
| Democratic hold | | | |

New Jersey general election, 2017
| Party | Candidate | Votes | % | ±% |
|---|---|---|---|---|
| Democratic | Shirley K. Turner | 36,624 | 74.0 | ▲10.7 |
| Republican | Lee Eric Newton | 12,839 | 26.0 | ▼10.7 |
| Total votes | | '49,463' | '100.0' | |

New Jersey State Senate elections, 2013
| Party | Candidate | Votes | % |
|---|---|---|---|
| Democratic | Shirley Turner (incumbent) | 30,250 | 63.3 |
| Republican | Donald J. Cox | 17,507 | 36.7 |
| Democratic hold | | | |

New Jersey State Senate elections, 2011
| Party | Candidate | Votes | % |
|---|---|---|---|
| Democratic | Shirley K. Turner (incumbent) | 21,512 | 66.4 |
| Republican | Donald J. Cox | 10,900 | 33.6 |
| Democratic hold | | | |

New Jersey State Senate elections, 2007
| Party | Candidate | Votes | % |
|---|---|---|---|
| Democratic | Shirley K. Turner (incumbent) | 20,100 | 62.8 |
| Republican | Bob Martin | 11,924 | 37.2 |
| Democratic hold | | | |

New Jersey general election, 2003
| Party | Candidate | Votes | % | ±% |
|---|---|---|---|---|
| Democratic | Shirley K. Turner | 24,053 | 67.4 | ▼1.7 |
| Republican | Calvin O. Iszard | 11,638 | 32.6 | ▲2.9 |
| Total votes | | '35,691' | '100.0' | |

New Jersey general election, 2001
| Party | Candidate | Votes | % |
|---|---|---|---|
| Democratic | Shirley K. Turner | 32,289 | 69.1 |
| Republican | Norbert E. Donelly | 13,871 | 29.7 |
| Libertarian | Thomas D. Abrams | 563 | 1.2 |
| Total votes | | 46,723 | 100.0 |

New Jersey general election, 1997
| Party | Candidate | Votes | % | ±% |
|---|---|---|---|---|
| Democratic | Shirley K. Turner | 29,995 | 53.9 | ▲6.2 |
| Republican | Dick LaRossa | 25,630 | 46.1 | ▼6.2 |
| Total votes | | '55,625' | '100.0' | |

=== Assembly ===
New Jersey general election, 1995
| Party | Candidate | Votes | % | ±% |
|---|---|---|---|---|
| Democratic | Shirley K. Turner | 20,681 | 28.2 | ▲2.5 |
| Democratic | Reed Gusciora | 19,294 | 26.3 | ▲2.6 |
| Republican | Joe Constance | 15,319 | 20.9 | ▼2.6 |
| Republican | Gloria S. Teti | 14,675 | 20.0 | ▲1.0 |
| Conservative | George E. Borchers | 1,131 | 1.5 | N/A |
| Libertarian | Robert D. Figueroa | 1,105 | 1.5 | N/A |
| Conservative | Beverly Kidder | 1,029 | 1.4 | N/A |
| Total votes | | '73,234' | '100.0' | |

New Jersey general election, 1993
| Party | Candidate | Votes | % | ±% |
|---|---|---|---|---|
| Democratic | Shirley K. Turner | 25,759 | 25.7 | ▲4.4 |
| Democratic | Joseph Yuhas | 23,714 | 23.7 | ▲4.2 |
| Republican | John Hartmann | 23,495 | 23.5 | ▼1.7 |
| Republican | Donald C. Addison, Jr. | 19,062 | 19.0 | ▼2.2 |
| Independent | Carl J. Mayer | 6,531 | 6.5 | N/A |
| For the People | Tony Belardo | 1,361 | 1.4 | N/A |
| Constitutional Enforcer | Clinton C. Barlow | 235 | 0.2 | N/A |
| Total votes | | '100,157' | '100.0' | |

New Jersey Senate
| Preceded by Joseph A. Palaia | President pro tempore of the New Jersey Senate; 2002–2010; Served alongside: Joseph A. Palaia (2002–2004) | Succeeded by Nia Gill |
| Preceded by Sandra Bolden Cunningham | President pro tempore of the New Jersey Senate; 2024–present | Incumbent |
