= Ed Forchion =

American activist, actor, and restaurateur (born 1964)

Robert Edward Forchion Jr
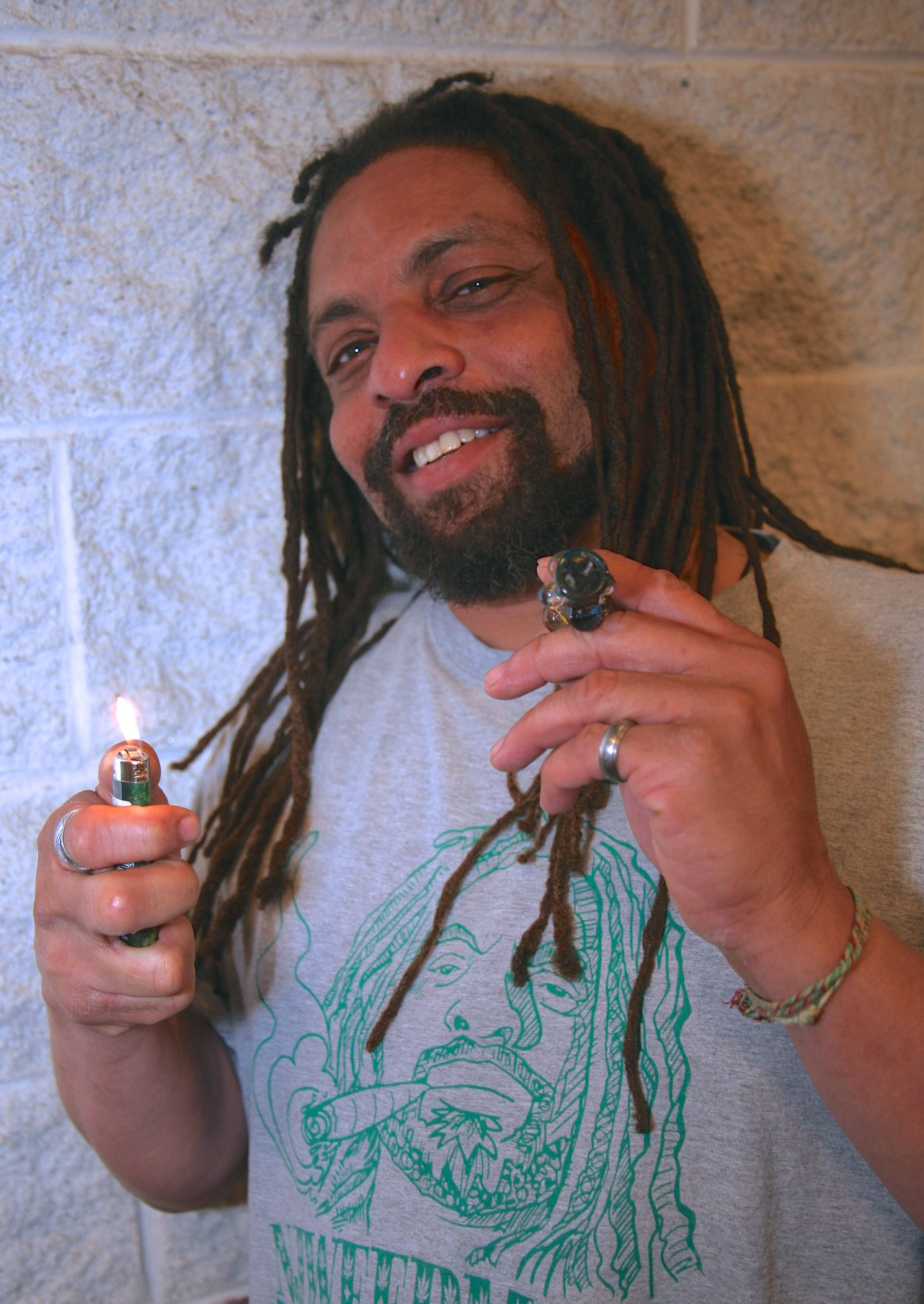
- Ed Forchion, also known as NJ Weedman, in Atlantic City, New Jersey, 2019
- Born: Robert Edward Forchion Jr; July 23, 1964 (age 61); Sicklerville, New Jersey, U.S.
- Other name: NJ Weedman
- Occupations: Activist, actor, writer, restaurateur
- Known for: Cannabis rights activism
- Political party: Legalize Marijuana Party

Edward Forchion (born Robert Edward Forchion Jr., July 23, 1964), also known as NJWeedman, is an American Rastafari cannabis rights and free speech activist, perennial candidate, actor, writer, and restaurateur. He is the founder of the Legalize Marijuana Party. In 2020 he legally changed his name to NJ Weedman.

A resident of New Jersey and California, he is a registered medical cannabis user. He has been arrested and convicted for some of his activities and has mounted various legal defenses and challenges to laws regarding cannabis.

After his last arrest the state of New Jersey filed a motion on March 7, 2017, for pretrial detention to incarcerate Forchion until trial. Forchion held a hunger strike for nearly two weeks while being held without bail, calling himself a political prisoner. The trial began October 26, 2017. On November 8, the jury found him not guilty of one charge of second-degree witness tampering, and was hung on another charge in the third degree. In January 2018, he was again denied bail, pending a re-trial. His appeal to being denied bail and being released was denied in February 2018. In May 2018, in the second trial, he was acquitted by a jury on charges of witness tampering. He had spent 447 days in jail.

Following the legalization of cannabis in New Jersey in 2021, Forchion began openly selling marijuana from an unlicensed store across from the city hall in Trenton. He has said he will not close his store.

Later in 2021, Forchion began weed-friendly ventures in Florida.

== Personal life ==
Forchion was born in Camden, New Jersey, in 1964 and grew up in the Sicklerville section of Winslow Township, New Jersey. He is a resident of Browns Mills in Pemberton Township, New Jersey. Forchion graduated from Edgewood Regional High School in 1982 and attended Claflin College (1983–1984). He was a member of the New Jersey National Guard (1982–1984) and United States Marine Corps (1986). He was a member of the U.S Army 1987-1990 as Edward Forchion. Forchion also owned and operated a trucking business - Forchion Trucking.

Forchion is a Rastafarian and has been using cannabis since he was a teen, in 2001 he was diagnosed with tumors in his knees and shoulders, which later become cancerous. He is a registered medical cannabis user in California. Forchion is a father of five children and is twice divorced.

On August 25, 2005, while he was campaigning for Governor of New Jersey, Forchion’s home in Pemberton Township was vandalized during the night by someone who spray-painted a 6-foot cross together with the words “Get Jesus.” Burlington County police investigated the incident, calling it a hate crime because Forchion is a person of color. But Forchion told reporters that he thought he had been targeted because of his Rastafari religious beliefs, not because he is African American.

== NJ Weedman ==
Forchion uses the moniker NJWeedman. He has attempted to have his name legally changed to NJWeedman.com (his domain name), but was denied, first by the courts in New Jersey in 2004 and in another case in California in 2011, which cited, among other things, comity with New Jersey's ruling.

On October 17 of 2022, a Mercer County, NJ judge approved his petition to change his name. NJWeedman.com expects his close friends and family will still call him "Ed," but he intends to otherwise make full use of his new name.

== Arrests, trials, and legal motions ==
Forchion has been arrested several times and has mounted many legal challenges to his arrest and trials.

Forchion was arrested for "intent to distribute" on November 24, 1997, in Bellmawr, New Jersey. Forchion accepted a plea bargain for a 10-year state prison sentence in September 2000. In April 2002 he was released and admitted to New Jersey's intensive parole supervision program. State authorities claimed he violated terms of probation by filming several public service announcements advocating changes to New Jersey's drug laws and Forchion was held in jail. A federal judge later held that expulsion from the program and additional incarceration violated his free speech protections.

In 2007 Forchion and his second wife Janice divorced and he moved to Los Angeles and successfully opened several marijuana dispensaries (Liberty Bell Temple I, Liberty Bell Temple II and the United States Collective - USC.

In 2010 Forchion was arrested in Mount Holly, New Jersey, after a traffic stop. He was charged with possession with intent to distribute and convicted of possession and sentenced to two years probation and a $2,500 fine. However, the jury couldn't reach a verdict on intent to distribute. A separate trial was convened. and Forchion urged the jury to employ jury nullification to overturn an unjust law. The defense which proved effective and resulted in Forchion receiving a 12-0 verdict of acquittal. Despite this victory, his conviction for possession led Forchion to later be convicted for violating the terms of probation, a sentence for which the judge jailed him for nine months, and for which he lost his appeal. He was allowed out of custody intermittently to go to California for treatment of bone tumours (20 20-day periods of incarceration separated by 10-day periods of release). Forchion had a medical marijuana card from California and had argued that he was "convicted and sentenced to 270 days in jail only for bringing his legally prescribed medicine into the State of New Jersey."

In 2012, federal agents in California raided his cannabis farm, confiscating the plants. The case was eventually dismissed.

Forchion was arrested April 15, 2013, in Evesham Township, New Jersey, for possession. Forchion soon after published online his legal brief to the court (which contends that New Jersey laws on marijuana are contradictory) for use by others to fill-in and use in their own defense.

Forchion was arrested on various charges in Trenton in 2016. On March 3, 2017, Forchion was arrested and charged with second-degree witness tampering and third-degree witness tampering. He was ordered to be held without bail; his appeal for release was denied. Forchion was placed in pre-trial detention at the Mercer County Correction Center in Hopewell, New Jersey. Forchion began a hunger strike on June 12 and ending it June 27. In July 2017, Forchion made a motion to review his detention saying that his attorney had misrepresented him and that material evidence would clarify that his intentions would not qualify as witness tampering.

== Petitions for review and petitions for certiorari ==
Forchion, in a petition for review has asked the New Jersey Supreme Court for a discretionary review stemming from his conviction. He asked; "Should the holding in State v. Tate, 102 N.J. 64 (1986), barring the necessity defense for possession of marijuana for medical purposes, be modified or overruled?", claiming that the ruling was outdated.

On March 8, 2016, Forchion and his lawyers filed a Petition for Writ of Certiorari to the U.S. Supreme Court (US Supreme Court Docket – 15–8533) with ten questions for review regarding race and religion as it relates to cannabis. The court declined.

== Political candidacy ==
Forchion established the New Jersey Legalize Marijuana Party in 1998. In 2004, Forchion ran as a U.S. Marijuana Party candidate; In 2018 he ran as an independent candidate under the banner “Repeal Bail Reform;” In 2020 he ran as an independent candidate with no slogan; In 2021 Forchion ran under the slogan “HomeGrow 4All,” and in 2024 Weedman was a Legal Marijuana Now Party primary nominee, in addition to running as a Legalize Marijuana candidate in the following elections:

- United States House of Representatives for NJ Congressional District 1 in 1998, and 2000
- New Jersey State Assembly, Legislative District 8 in 1999 and 2011
- Camden County Freeholder in 1999
- Burlington County Freeholder in 2000, and 2004
- United States House of Representatives for NJ Congressional District 3 in 2004, and 2012 An attempt to get on the ballot in 2014 was unsuccessful
- Governor of New Jersey in 2005, and 2021
- United States Senate for New Jersey in 2006
- United States House of Representatives for NJ Congressional District 12 in 2016, and 2020
- New Jersey State Assembly, Legislative District 15 in 2018
- President of the United States in 2024

== Liberty Bell Temple and restaurants ==
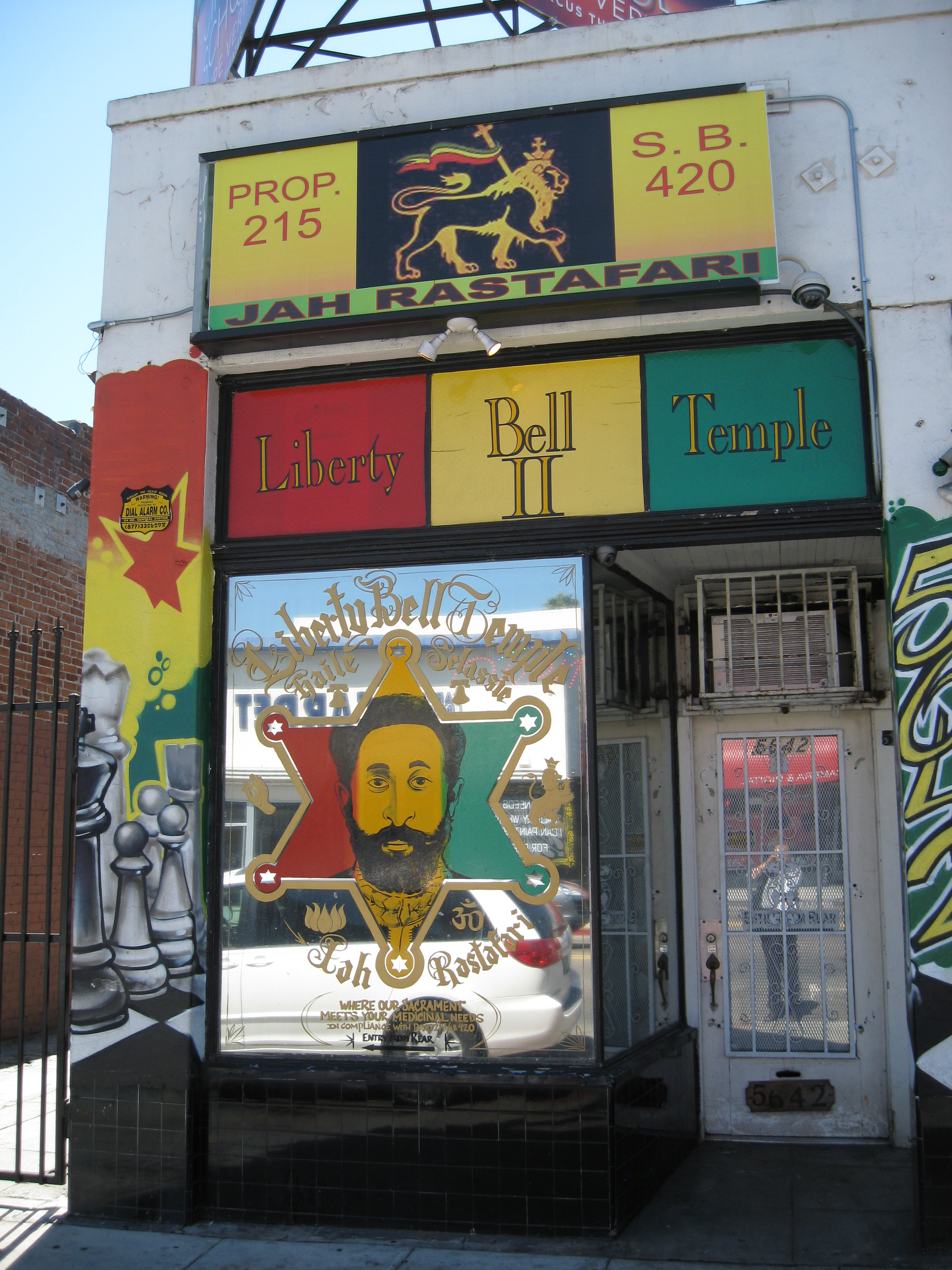
Liberty Bell Temple II in Hollywood, next to Liberty Bell Lounge

Forchion has opened two temples, named Liberty Bell Temple II and Liberty Bell Temple III, which have been connected to adjacent restaurant lounges. The names were inspired by the Liberty Bell in Philadelphia. In 1993, when the U.S. Congress passed the (42 U.S.C. § 2000bb(a)) Religious Freedom and Restoration Act which allows for the religious use of marijuana on federal grounds during the course of a religious ceremony, Forchion initiated "smoke outs" or "smoke downs" at the national monument.

The restaurant NJWeedman's Joint in Trenton, New Jersey, opened in 2015. and in 2016 was raided by local police and Forchion was arrested. The matter is subject of further litigation. In February 2018, a judge dismissed 13 of 22 tickets for various violations, saying they were dispensed incorrectly.

The restaurant reopened in May 2017 and was renamed "Weedbukx". Starbucks informed Forchion and his partner that the logo for the new cafe was similar to theirs.

The restaurant re-opened after Forchion's release in 2018, and is known as the Joint.

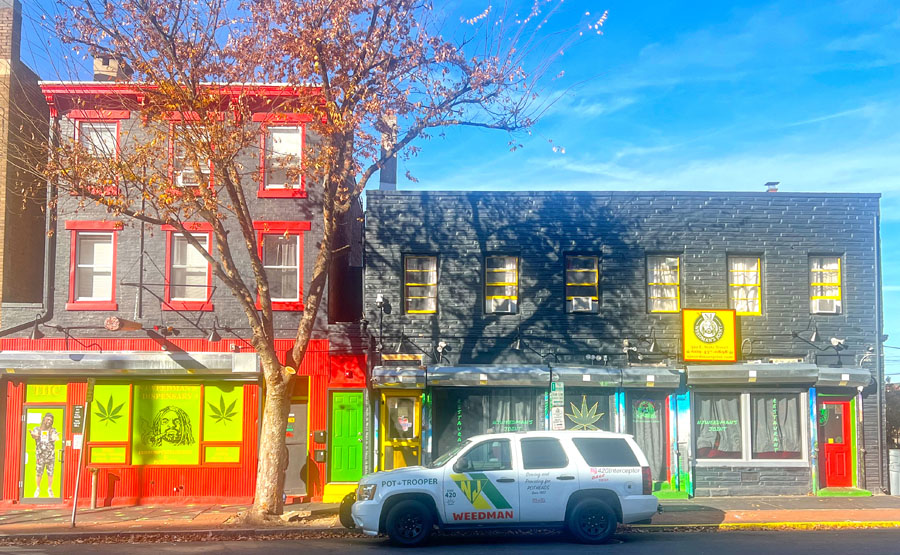
NJWeedmans Dispensary & Restaurant

Since the legalization of cannabis in 2021, the restaurant has openly operated as a black market cannabis dispensary. On 9/11/2020 he opened NJWeedman's Dispensary next to NJWeedman's Joint Restaurant 318-322 East State street. In Oct 2023 Trenton City passed a resolution officially accepting NJWeedman's Dispensary as legal.

== Get On The Cannabus ==
In September 2020, during one of his political campaigns for New Jersey public office and the legalization of marijuana on the ballot, Forchion started his potcast, Get On The Cannabus, on Spotify, Apple Podcasts and YouTube. The podcast interviews marijuana entrepreneurs and raffles off free cannabis products in what is known as the Reefer Raffle. When the podcast began, Forchion sold weed illegally on camera in protest of the unjust cannabis laws in New Jersey and America, in what he called "Selling Weed Like He's White." After multiple episodes, marijuana was legalized in New Jersey and NJ Weedman's Joint became the location of the first unofficial New Jersey Recreational Dispensary on January 1, 2021. The podcast is produced by Jordan Fried of LNH Studios and William "Gmunk" Saunders of Hamilton Radio and is guest hosted by the various budtenders at NJ Weedman's Joint.

== Miami ==
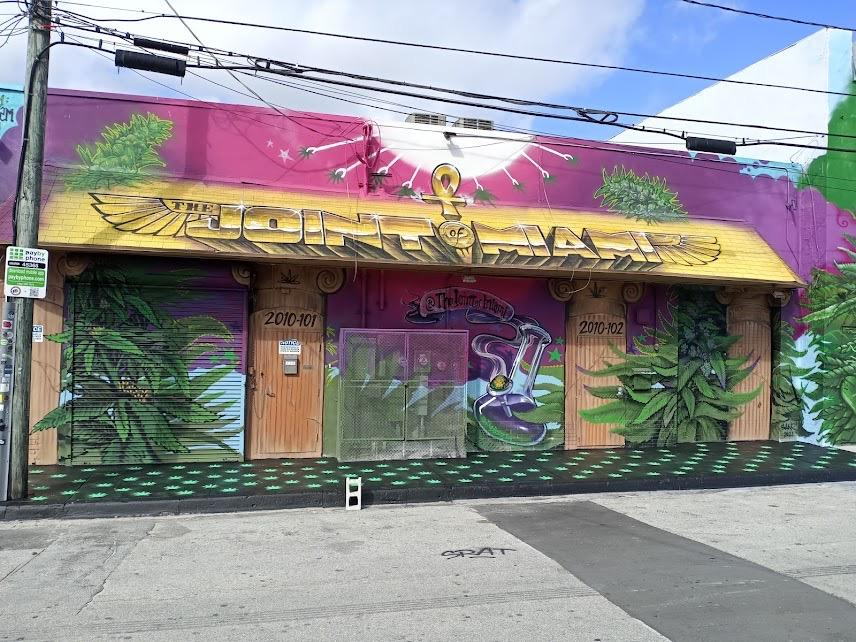
The Joint of Miami

In the spring of 2021 NJWeedman opened a 420 friendly nightclub in Miami (the wynnwood art district) called THE JOINT of MIAMI. A few months later he gave it to his son "KING".

== Writing, film, television, and radio ==
Forchion wrote Public Enemy #420, published in 2010, and Politics of Pot, Jersey Style: The persecution prosecution of NJweedman in 2014. He has written for The Trentonian. Forchion has appeared in various television programs and documentaries including a filming version of The Emperor Wears No Clothes (2009), How Weed Won the West by Kevin Booth (2010), 1000 Ways to Die: Fatal Distractions (2010), Supreme Court of Comedy: Tony Rock vs. Harland Williams (2010) and Million Mask Movement by Vinu Joseph (2016). He has spoken for various podcasts and radio programs.

== See also ==
- Cannabis and religion
- Cannabis dispensaries in the United States
- Cannabis in California
- Cannabis in New Jersey
- Cannabis political parties of the United States
- Freedom of speech in the United States
- Fully Informed Jury Association
