= Robert C. Shelton Jr. =

American politician (1934–2023)

Member of the New Jersey General Assembly from the 15th Legislative District
- In office January 8, 1974 – January 13, 1976 Serving with Robert Littell
- Preceded by: District created
- Succeeded by: Donald J. Albanese

Personal details
- Born: April 14, 1934 Franklin, New Jersey, U.S.
- Died: June 9, 2023 (aged 89) Sparta, New Jersey, U.S.
- Party: Democratic

Robert C. Shelton Jr. (April 14, 1934 – June 9, 2023) was an American politician who served in the New Jersey General Assembly from the 15th Legislative District from 1974 to 1976. Shelton died in Sparta, New Jersey on June 9, 2023, at the age of 89.
