= Dick LaRossa =

American politician

Member of the New Jersey Senate from the 15th district
- In office January 14, 1992 – January 13, 1998
- Preceded by: Gerald R. Stockman
- Succeeded by: Shirley Turner

Personal details
- Born: Richard Joseph LaRossa; July 1, 1946 (age 80) Trenton, New Jersey
- Party: Republican
- Other political affiliations: Independent (2018)

Richard Joseph LaRossa (born July 1, 1946) is an American Republican Party politician and former television presenter who served two terms in the New Jersey Senate, where he represented the 15th Legislative District from 1992 to 1998.

== Early years and education ==
LaRossa was born and raised in Trenton, where he attended Notre Dame High School. He received his undergraduate degree from Trenton State College (now The College of New Jersey), with a major in speech and theater and did graduate work in psychology at Fairleigh Dickinson University. He is the owner of the Computer Services Group.

== New Jersey Lottery ==
Beginning in 1980, LaRossa began hosting the weekend drawings for the New Jersey Lottery, which were televised by New Jersey Network at the time. For the next eleven years, LaRossa would draw the nightly Pick-3 and Pick-4 games on Saturday and Sunday nights and also would substitute for weeknight host Hela Young on occasion. This helped make him what The New York Times described as "arguably one of the most recognizable faces in the state". A member of both the American Federation of Television and Radio Artists and Actors' Equity Association, LaRossa had a regular weekend gig as emcee and lead vocalist for an 18-piece swing band called the Lamplighters, billing himself as "the singing Senator".

== Political career ==
=== Tenure in the New Jersey Senate ===
LaRossa left the lottery in 1991 to challenge incumbent Senator Gerald R. Stockman. He won by a narrow 50.9%-49.1% margin to become the first Republican state senator to represent Trenton since 1946. LaRossa's victory came in a good year for New Jersey Republicans as they won both houses of the legislature easily.

LaRossa faced Stockman for a second time in 1993, with the incumbent receiving endorsements from the AFL-CIO, locals of the Communications Workers of America and the New Jersey State Patrolmen's Benevolent Association. LaRossa won reelection, this time by a margin of 52.3% to 47.7%, in a year that saw the Republicans not only retain their legislative majority but also win the gubernatorial election for the first time since 1985. LaRossa served in the Senate as Chair of the Urban Policy and Planning Committee and as a member of the Budget and Appropriations Committee.

Running for a third term in 1997, LaRossa was defeated by Democrat Shirley Turner. Although the Republicans managed to keep control of the legislature and the governorship, LaRossa was one of two Republican Senators to fall to defeat; John Scott in District 36 was the other. In the loss to Turner, LaRossa received 46.1% of the votes to Turner's 53.9%.

=== 1996 US Senate election ===
In the 1996 New Jersey Republican primary for U.S. Senate, LaRossa came in third with 12%, behind three-term Congressman Dick Zimmer who had 68% of the vote and Passaic County Freeholder Richard DuHaime with 19%. Zimmer was the front-runner from the start, getting endorsements from Republican leaders across the state, including Gov. Christine Todd Whitman. Both DuHaime, a pro-life candidate, and LaRossa, a pro-gun candidate, attempted to portray Zimmer as too liberal, but Zimmer largely ignored his opponents and won the primary.

=== Post-Senate ===
Throughout 2010 and 2011, LaRossa advocated against the policies of the Obama administration. He was sympathetic to the Tea Party Movement. LaRossa gave opening remarks at a Tea Party convention titled "The Battle of Trenton" in 2011, named for the battle during the American Revolutionary War. LaRossa was a keynote speaker for the New Jersey Constitution Party at their annual New Jersey's Constitution Day celebration. During these events, LaRossa reaffirmed his stances against the Obama administration's policies and advocated for candidates and voters to be pragmatic regarding holding public servants accountable. Themes of accountability and fiscal responsibility were common in his appearances.

=== Local Politics ===
In 2018, LaRossa sought one of two seats on Ewing Township Council as an independent, on a slate with Kate McKinley for council and Ronald Prykanowski for mayor. They challenged the incumbent Democratic mayor Bert Steinmann and councilmembers Kathleen Wollert and Sara Steward. LaRossa finished in fourth, receiving 11.33% percent of the vote.

In 2021, LaRossa sought the Republican nomination for Mercer County Surrogate. LaRossa ran on a slate with four others titled "Mercer Republicans United", a name which attempted to highlight the existing fractures within the Mercer County Republican Party. The slate included Jennifer Williams for Republican State Committeeperson, who was later elected to Trenton City Council in the North Ward in 2022. Along with LaRossa and Williams, Joseph Stillwell, Michel Hurtado (later an Assembly candidate in 2023), and Volodymyr "Vlad" Machevus (Ukrainian: Володимир Мачевус) ran for the Mercer County Board of County Commissioners. The campaign portrayed LaRossa as a moderate elder statesman, and the slate claimed their focus was to "form a team of candidates who are committed to winning, building the Republican Party, and reaching out to every voter – no matter where they live". The slate also advocated for promoting government accountability, fiscal transparency, attracting business, and fighting to protect the environment. Mercer Republicans United and their campaign became a watched primary for New Jersey Republicans across the state. Their race was known for creating a viable alternative option for Mercer Republicans and their slate was viewed with heavy notoriety. The race was also important to the 2021 New Jersey Gubernatorial Primary Election due to their placement on the Mercer County ballot line with gubernatorial candidate Phil Rizzo in column C. This placement disgruntled the members of Mercer Republicans United due to comments made by Rizzo that had Anti-Catholic undertones. Phil Rizzo, a Baptist pastor and GOP gubernatorial candidate, once said of Catholics: “I don’t know if these people have ever heard the Gospel. Not only are they in bondage to their sin, but they’re in bondage to religion." Williams, LaRossa, Stillwell, and Hurtado are Roman Catholic, while Volodymyr Machevus is a Ukrainian Greek Catholic. Their slate carried support for Phil Rizzo in Mercer, who ended up placing second in the primary ahead of well-funded candidate Hirsh Singh and behind winner Jack Ciattarelli. This campaign was a forerunner to a growing trend of competitive Republican primaries in New Jersey. LaRossa placed second in the Republican primary election, receiving 45.6% of the vote against Douglas Miles.

== Election results ==
The 1991 New Jersey Senate Republican primary for the 15th district was the narrowest race of the year. The 15th district, based in Trenton, was heavily Democratic.

During the campaign, Stockman, who had sponsored the tax increase, defended it and referred to Republican proposals to repeal it as "snake oil." Stockman, the chair of the Senate County and Municipal Government Committee, had also sponsored a bill to reform tax assessment which critics said would create a mass exodus from larger cities, including Trenton.

1997 New Jersey Senate LD15 general election
Party	Candidate	Votes	%	±%
Democratic	Shirley Turner	29,995	53.9	▲6.2
Republican	Dick LaRossa (incumbent)	25,630	46.1	▼6.2
Total votes		55,625	100.00%	

2021 Mercer County Surrogate primary
Party	Candidate	Votes	%
Republican	Douglas Miles	4,094	54.5%
Republican	Dick LaRossa	3,419	45.5%
Total votes		7,522	100.0%

New Jersey Senate
Preceded by Gerald R. Stockman	Member of the New Jersey Senate from the 15th district January 14, 1992–January 13, 1998	Succeeded by Shirley Turner
