= Rastafari movement in the United States =

Rastafari movement in America

The Rastafari movement in the United States echoes the Rastafari religious movement, which began in Jamaica, and Ethiopia during the 1930s. Marcus Garvey, born in Jamaica, was influenced by the Ethiopian king Haile Selassie. Jamaican Rastafaris began emigrating to the United States in the 1960s and 1970s, and established communities throughout the country.

== Background ==
The name Rastafari derives from Ras Tafari, the title (ras) and first name of Haile Selassie (Täfäri Mäkonnän) before his coronation. In Amharic, ras ("head") is an Ethiopian title equivalent to prince or chief; the given name Täfäri (teferi) means "one who is revered". Rastafari originated in Jamaica and Ethiopia. Rastas believe Jah is the name of God, a shortened form of Yahweh. Most Rastafaris see Haile Selassie as Jah or Jah Rastafari, an incarnation of God. Rastafari practices involve the spiritual use of cannabis and the rejection of a society of materialism, oppression, and sensual pleasures it calls "Babylon". Rastas assert that Zion (Ethiopia) is a land promised to them by Jah. "Babylon" is considered to have been rebelling against "Earth's Rightful Ruler" (Jah) since the days of the biblical king Nimrod. The lion is a symbol of Rastafari because it appears on the flag used in Haile Selassie's Ethiopia.

== Marcus Garvey ==
Marcus Garvey, a Jamaican activist, spoke about creating an African state for displaced Africans; this idea influenced many black people. According to Garvey, Haile Selassie of Ethiopia was the only remaining African monarch with Biblical ancestry. Working-class Jamaicans viewed Garvey as a prophet and the reincarnation of John the Baptist. When Ras Täfäri of Ethiopia was crowned emperor in 1930, many proclaimed Haile Selassie as Jah (God).

Although the movement has had cultural, social, and political effects on Ethiopia and Jamaica, little scholarly research has been done on its effects in the United States. A number of Rastafari see the country as the heart of evil in the world, but many Jamaican Rastafari made the United States their new home during the 1960s and 1970s. The Rastafari movement played a role in shaping local U.S. society and culture, seen in Garvey's accomplishments, the effects of Rastafari community-building, and riddim and reggae music.

== Universal Negro Improvement Association ==
Garvey tried to organize black people worldwide, to give them an influential voice in society with overwhelming numbers. He established the Universal Negro Improvement Association (UNIA). After failed attempts to create a following in Jamaica, Garvey relocated the UNIA to upper Manhattan's Harlem neighborhood. By 1920, he had over 2,000,000 members in over 1,000 local UNIA chapters.

The association had the goal of establishing black political and economic independence. Garvey initially came to the U.S. to preach black nationalism through the back-to-Africa movement. Displaced Africans would return to the land of their ancestors, where they would create a prosperous African state and make the continent a world power. In 1924, with the financial assistance of UNIA members, Garvey sought to purchase one million acres (4000 km^{2}) of land from Liberia. This land would be the place of repatriation about which Garvey had spoken for nearly two decades. Eleven days after Garvey agreed to purchase the land, however, Firestone Tires (with the aid of the U.S. government) bought the land instead.

== Negro Factories Corporation ==
Established on January 20, 1920, the Negro Factories Corporation (an offshoot of the UNIA) sought to create factories which would employ only black people and produce commodities sold only to black consumers. Garvey envisioned an all-black economy which could supply black consumers around the globe, and advocated independent black grocery stores, restaurants, laundromats, tailor shops, millinery stores, and publishing houses. The Negro Factories Corporation gave black people initiative, hope, and the secular identity required to prosper in American society.

== Black Star Line ==
Garvey announced the creation of the Black Star Line on June 23, 1919 to correlate with the back-to-Africa movement as a shipping company which would link black communities in the U.S., Jamaica, Canada, Central America, and Africa. It was intended to transport black produced goods, including raw materials and manufactured items, to black consumers around the world. Garvey had to raise $500,000 to purchase the company's first ship, and sold stock only to black people. Over 15,000 people saw the S.S. Frederick Douglass set sail on its first trip to Jamaica. The company folded in 1922, with net losses estimated at over $1,000,000.

== Community-building ==
Jamaican Rastafaris began to immigrate to the United States during the 1960s and 1970s. Small, local, homogeneous communities sprang up in Philadelphia, Boston, Hartford, Miami, Washington, D.C., Los Angeles, San Francisco, Chicago, Houston, and (most notably) New York City, where six Rastafari communities exist in its five boroughs. The most influential of the city's communities are in the Crown Heights and Bedford-Stuyvesant sections of Brooklyn. Local Rastafari communities generally consist of community centers, schools, tabernacles, and Rasta cultural stores.

== See also ==
- Jamaican Americans
- Jamaican diaspora
