= Reed Gusciora =

American politician (born 1960)

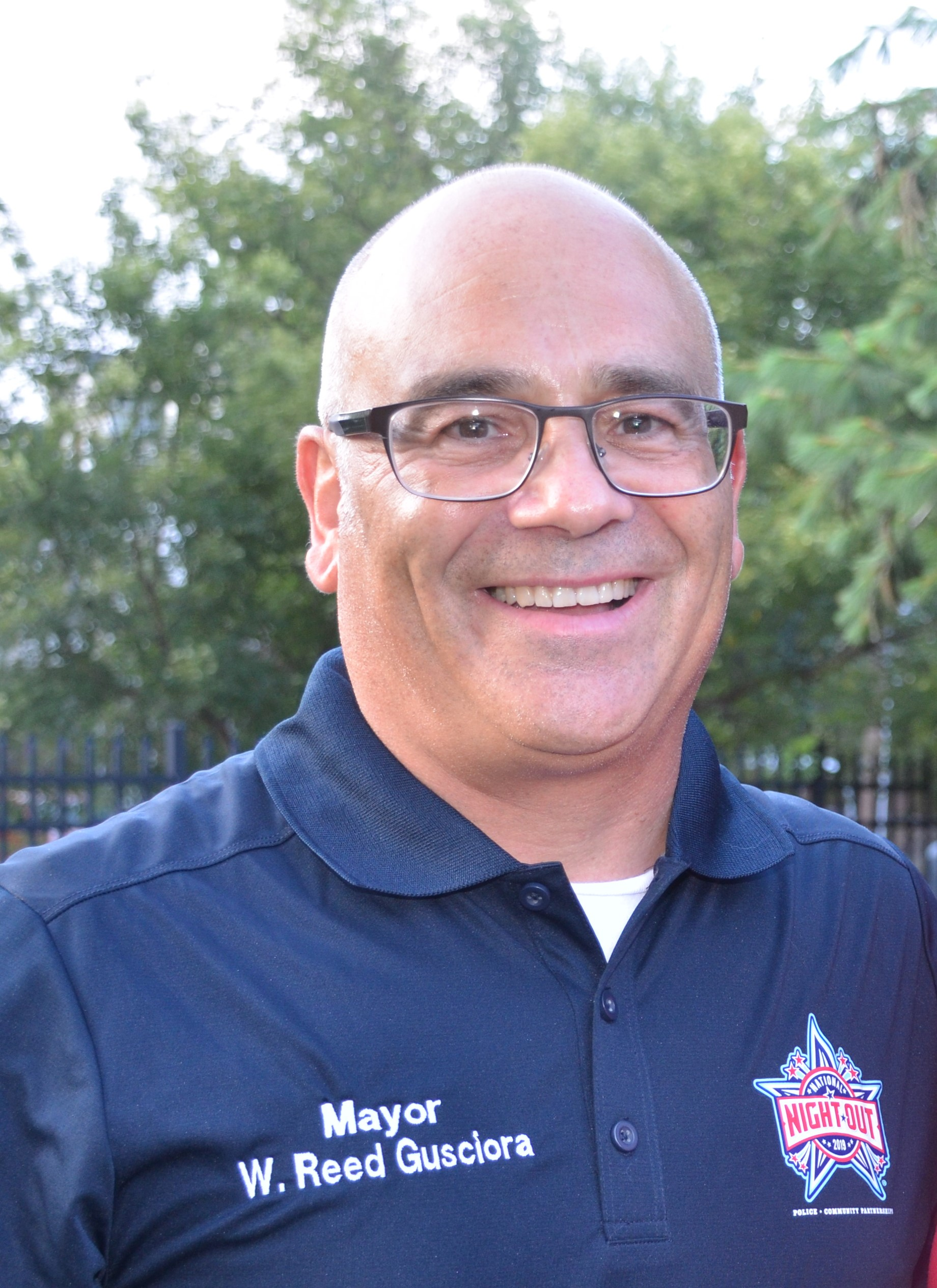

49th Mayor of Trenton
- Incumbent
- Assumed office July 1, 2018
- Preceded by: Eric Jackson

Member of the New Jersey General Assembly from the 15th district
- In office January 9, 1996 – July 1, 2018
- Preceded by: Joseph Yuhas
- Succeeded by: Anthony Verrelli

Personal details
- Born: Walter Reed Gusciora; March 27, 1960 (age 65) Passaic, New Jersey, U.S.
- Political party: Democratic
- Education: Catholic University (BA); Seton Hall University (JD)

Walter Reed Gusciora (born March 27, 1960) is an American attorney and Democratic Party politician who has served as the 49th mayor of Trenton, New Jersey since 2018. He previously served from 1996 to 2018 in the New Jersey General Assembly, where he represented the 15th legislative district.

== Early life ==
Walter Reed Gusciora was born on March 27, 1960 in Passaic, New Jersey and raised in Jamesburg, where he attended public schools and graduated from Jamesburg High School in 1978. Gusciora's father, Walter, worked at the New Jersey Department of Health in Trenton and the city was an integral part of his childhood. As a teenager, Gusciora worked for his family's company, Aardvark Pest Control, and in his free time, he spent time visiting Trenton's prominent museums and restaurants.

He received a B.A. from The Catholic University of America in politics and international relations and worked his way through college by working at the Library of Congress. After graduation, he worked on Capitol Hill in the congressional offices of Democratic U.S. Representatives Andy Ireland of Florida and Mike Synar of Oklahoma. In 1988, Gusciora received a Juris Doctor degree from Seton Hall University School of Law.

== Political career ==
In 1995, Gusciora was elected to the New Jersey General Assembly from the 15th legislative district, a Democratic stronghold, over former Mercer County Freeholder and Trenton Police Department deputy chief Joseph Constance, who received support from the National Rifle Association of America and campaigned against the state's teachers union, and Gloria Teti, a Lawrence Township businesswoman. He succeeded Joseph Yuhas.

The legislative redistricting plan adopted following the 2010 United States census moved Gusciora's Princeton residence into the heavily Republican 16th district. Gusciora immediately announced that he would put his Princeton home on the market and move to Trenton, a city that he had represented for over 20 years, some 12 miles (19 km) away.

Gusciora was Assistant Minority Leader from 1998 to 2001 and Deputy Majority Leader between 2008 and 2018. He chaired the committees on Regulatory Oversight, Federal Relations, & Reform and Environment & Solid Waste and was a member of the committees on Labor and Financial Institutions & Insurance.

In 2012, Gusciora gained national attention for his support of a bill to legalize same-sex marriage in New Jersey which was opposed by Governor Chris Christie. Gusciora stated, "Governors Lester Maddox and George Wallace would have found allies in Chris Christie over efforts by the Justice Department to end segregation in the South", and "[Christie] would have been happy to have a referendum on civil rights rather than fighting and dying in the streets of the South." Christie responded by calling Gusciora "numbnuts". The two later amended their differences.

In the Assembly, Gusciora authored the Paramount Safety Law, which changed New Jersey's legal standard in child custody cases to protect the health and well-being of the child when abuse has occurred, and a law to streamline services for people with developmental disabilities through the Department of Health and Human Services and the Department of Education.

=== 2000–2001 Legislative session ===
Gusciora sponsored 4 pieces of legislation signed into law by Governor Christine Todd Whitman and Governor Donald DiFrancesco: “The Emergency Management Assistance Compact Act,” establishing new procedures for the application for services provided to the developmentally disabled, and appropriating funding to a no-kill animal organization.

Gusciora served as the co-sponsor of 80 pieces of legislation signed into law including legislation that prohibits leaving an animal unattended under inhumane conditions in a vehicle, enacts the “FamilyCare Health Coverage Act,” creates the Neighborhood Revitalization State Tax Credit Act, and the “Senior Gold Prescription Discount Act.”

=== 2002–2003 Legislative session ===
Gusciora in 2003

Gusciora sponsored 35 pieces of legislation signed into law: Prohibiting firearm possession by persons convicted of serious violent crimes, making changes in the law concerning the cleanup of hazardous substances (environmental remediation), and appropriating millions in funding for local government open space acquisition and park development projects.

Gusciora co-sponsored 69 pieces of legislation signed into law: Expanding municipal power to address abandoned properties, permitting stem cell research in New Jersey, and prohibiting unsolicited telemarketing sales calls to certain customers.

=== 2004–2005 Legislative session ===
Gusciora sponsored 39 pieces of legislation that became law including the "New Jersey Smoke-Free Air Act" which prohibits smoking in indoor public places and workplaces, legislation that established a state rental assistance program patterned after section 8 housing with the allocation of funds under the Fair Housing Act to program as permitted purpose, and legislation that requires hospital and satellite emergency departments to provide care to sexual assault victims and information about emergency contraception.

=== 2006–2007 Legislative session ===
Gusciora was the sponsor of 25 pieces of legislation that became law: "Electronic Waste Recycling Act", establishing the Office of State Comptroller, and providing alternatives to prison for certain drug offenses.

Gusciora was the co-sponsor of 56 pieces of legislation that became law: Eliminating the death penalty in New Jersey, requiring boards of education to offer students instruction in gang violence prevention, enhancing penalties for possessing illegal guns.

=== 2008–2009 Legislative session ===
Gusciora sponsored 37 pieces of legislation: Appropriating funding to the New Jersey Department of Environmental Protection for clean water environmental infrastructure projects, legalizing medical marijuana through the "New Jersey Compassionate Use Medical Marijuana Act", and established the Court Appointed Special Advocate (CASA) program.

Gusciora co-sponsored 25 pieces of legislation: Permitting wind and solar energy facilities in industrial zones, prohibiting individuals from purchasing more than one handgun in a calendar month, and authorizing the New Jersey Board of Public Utilities to provide grants for combined heat and power production, energy efficiency projects and programs promoting renewable energy and energy efficiency.

=== 2010–2011 Legislative session ===
Gusciora sponsored 12 pieces of legislation: Allowing construction of wind dependent energy facilities on piers within 500 feet of mean high water line of tidal waters, allowing municipalities to reexamine municipal master plans every 10 years, and requiring instructions for workers filing unemployment insurance claims.

Gusciora co-sponsored 21 pieces of legislation: The "Anti-Bullying Bill of Rights Act", allowing students with disabilities to bring service animals to school, and authorizes companies under BPU jurisdiction to bill customers electronically upon their request.

=== 2014–2015 Legislative session ===
In the 2014-2015 legislative session, Gusciora sponsored 14 bills and co-sponsored 34 bills.

Gusciora co-sponsored legislation creating the option to make a voluntary contribution for the support of local libraries on gross income tax returns, establishing a program to provide assistance to qualified veterans in in-patient and out-patient treatment programs to travel to in-state medical counseling, and requiring school bus drivers and school bus aides to attend a training program on interacting with students with special needs.

Similarly, during this legislative session, Gusciora co-sponsored several key criminal justice reform bills: "The Opportunity to Compete Act" establishing certain employment rights for persons with a criminal record, requiring the New Jersey Department of Corrections to make reports containing information concerning treatment and reentry initiative participation, extending "Overdose Prevention Act" immunity provisions to certain professionals and professional entities, and permits needle exchange programs to obtain standing order for opioid antidotes.

=== 2016–2017 Legislative session ===
In the 2016-2017 legislative session, Gusciora sponsored twenty-eight bills and co-sponsored thirty-nine bills for a total of sixty-seven bills which were signed into law.

Gusciora sponsored legislation to authorize medical marijuana for qualifying patients with post-traumatic stress disorder, require that certain inmates with detainers be provided access to drug treatment programs, and exempt homeless individuals from paying fees for non-driver identification cards.

Gusciora co-sponsored "New Jersey Housing Assistance for Veterans Act," a pilot program to assist veterans with housing modification and rehabilitation as well as a bill to permit small, women-owned, or minority-owned businesses located in designated regional centers or planning areas to qualify for loans from the New Jersey Economic Development Agency (EDA) as if located in a designated urban center.

=== 2018–2019 Legislative session ===
Despite only serving in the New Jersey Legislature for the first six months of the 2018-2019 legislative session, Gusciora was the primary sponsor for 12 pieces of legislation and co-sponsor of 25 pieces of legislation that became law. Gusciora sponsored legislation restricting the use of isolated confinement in correctional facilities, requiring boards of education to include instruction that accurately portrays the political, economic, and social contributions of the LGBT community and persons with disabilities, and reinstating the duration of certain UEZs (areas within Trenton, Plainfield, Newark, Camden, and Bridgeton that provide tax benefits to commercial properties).

Gusciora co-sponsored legislation requiring a background check for private gun sales, reducing the maximum capacity of ammunition magazines to 10 rounds, and requiring "breakfast after the bell" in all schools with 70% or more of students eligible for free or reduced price meals.

=== Mayor of Trenton (2018–present) ===
He defeated businessman Paul Perez to become Mayor of Trenton in 2018, earning 52 percent of the vote in a runoff election on June 12 since no candidate won the 50 percent threshold or more in the May 8 election.

==== Youth initiatives ====
Gusciora convened the first youth council since the Doug Palmer administration a decade prior, consisting of students between eight grade and high school seniors, representing each of the four wards, who provided counsel to Gusciora.

Gusciora's administration hired a record number of city youth for summer employment and expanded summer programming for city students.

Gusciora's initiative, "Trenton Production and Knowledge Innovation Campus" (TPKIC), was awarded the Innovative Challenge grant by the New Jersey Economic Development Authority. The City partnered with Princeton University, Rider University, The College of New Jersey, Thomas Edison State University, and Mercer County Community College to build the vision behind the application, which seeks to support start-up businesses, local creators, students and faculty at partner colleges and universities, and Trenton Public Schools students and recent graduates.

Gusciora launch of the Trenton Youth "WIN" App, a mobile application, which is designed to connect City youth with access to essential services. The City of Trenton, in conjunction with the County of Mercer and Continuum of Care partners, accepted the pledge to prevent and end youth homelessness in 2020. As part of the United States Interagency Council on Homelessness (USICH) Opening Doors: Federal Strategic Plan to Prevent and End Homelessness, the City of Trenton has developed community partnerships to promote, educate, and commit to eliminating homelessness within the Capital City. The WIN application has been identified as a crucial way to establish channels of communication with youth who may feel embarrassed when going to a governmental agency. ”

==== Housing and economic development ====
Within his first 6 months of holding office, Gusciora reported that his administration had received $17 million in new public and private grant funding and that there were pursuing $19 million in grants and aid.

Gusciora also stated that $6 million in Community Development Block Grants (from 2011 to 2018), from the U.S. Department of Housing and Urban Development, was in the process of being unfrozen. On January 21, 2020, Gusciora stated that the U.S. Department of Housing and Urban Development had decided to release funds to the Capital City because of Gusciora's re-hiring of key positions needed for the appropriate management of federal funds. While most of the funding was used to pay back the city for past projects, the rest will go into public facility renovations and improvements for senior centers.

In September 2019, Gusciora touted the results of Trenton's monthly public property auction as the largest and most successful in the city's history. On that day alone, 86 City-owned properties, valued at a collective $3.3 million, were auctioned off, and went back on the tax rolls. Around the same time, Gusciora and the Trenton Housing Authority (THA) won $1.3 million in Choice Neighborhood Planning and Action Grant funds, distributed by the U.S. Department of Housing and Urban Development to develop a comprehensive neighborhood transformation plan for Donnelly Homes.

In December 2019, legislation that Gusciora designed and advocated for authorizing sidewalk cafés without City approval and the distribution of alcohol for brunch on Sunday mornings was passed by the City Council.

==== Public safety ====
On October 15, 2019, Gusciora announced that the city had been awarded $85,000 from the U.S. Department of Homeland Security through the Federal Emergency Management Agency's 2019 Port Security Grant Program. The funds subsidized the purchase of three watercraft with engines, dive rescue equipment, and additional supplies.

Gusciora spearheaded the creation of a Real Time Crime Center, a partnership with the New Jersey State Police, to prevent future criminal activity.

In 2022, Darrell L. Clarke and members of the Philadelphia City Council met with Gusciora to learn about Trenton's crime reduction strategies after Trenton went three summer months without a homicide.

==== Health and human services ====
In November 2019, Gusciora shared that the City of Trenton's Department of Health had won a $95,000 grant "Strengthening Local Public Health Capacity Grant Operations" from the New Jersey Department of Health. The funds are being utilized to supplement Gusciora's efforts to reduce the number of residents affected by vaccine-preventable illnesses.

Gusciora launched Trenton's first Neighborhood Health Clinic, which provides free vaccinations for city residents and is expected to provide primary services in the future.

Gusciora's published a document "COVID-19: Trenton Testing Status Report," which outlined steps that his administration had taken to reduce the fatality rate of COVID-19 in the Capital City during the pandemic. The report was the first of its kind written by a municipality in New Jersey and published publicly. At the time of the report, the city's fatality rate of those infected with COVID-19 was 2.8% while the fatality rate in the state of New Jersey was 7.4%. Gusciora outlined a set of proactive steps that the city had taken to increase the amount of testing, secure personal protective equipment, and coordinate with other governmental agencies.

One of Gusciora's policies, created a business loan program for city small businesses, who could apply for up to $20,000 in emergency loans. The Trenton Emergency Loan Program used existing funds from the city's urban enterprise zone and exceeded state and county programs set up to assist businesses with their economic recovery.

==== Veterans' issues ====
In November 2019, Gusciora collaborated with veteran Willie Smith and a student leader at Trenton Central High School to win Governor Murphy's "We Value our Veterans Community Award" to help Trenton veterans access medical care, find employment, and locate permanent housing.

==== Executive leadership ====
In July 2019, Gusciora announced that he had been selected as one of 40 mayors to participate in the Bloomberg Harvard City Leadership Initiative. The mission of the program is to inspire and strengthen city leaders as well as equip them with the tools to lead high-performing and innovative cities.

== Political views ==
Gusciora is a supporter of gay rights and same-sex marriage.

== Personal life ==
In December 2006, Gusciora publicly acknowledged his homosexuality, thereby becoming the first ever openly gay member of the New Jersey Legislature. In January 2012, he was joined by Assemblyman Tim Eustace, the openly gay mayor of Maywood, who was elected to the General Assembly from the 38th district.

== See also ==
- LGBT culture in New Jersey

Political offices
Preceded by Eric Jackson	Mayor of Trenton; 2018–present	Incumbent
