= Legalize Marijuana Party =

New Jersey political party advocating cannabis legalization

- Spokesperson: Ed Forchion
- Founded: 1998
- Ideology: Cannabis legalization
- National affiliation: Legal Marijuana Now

The Legalize Marijuana Party is a political third party in the U.S. state of New Jersey established in 1998 by Edward Forchion to protest cannabis prohibition.

== Gubernatorial candidates ==
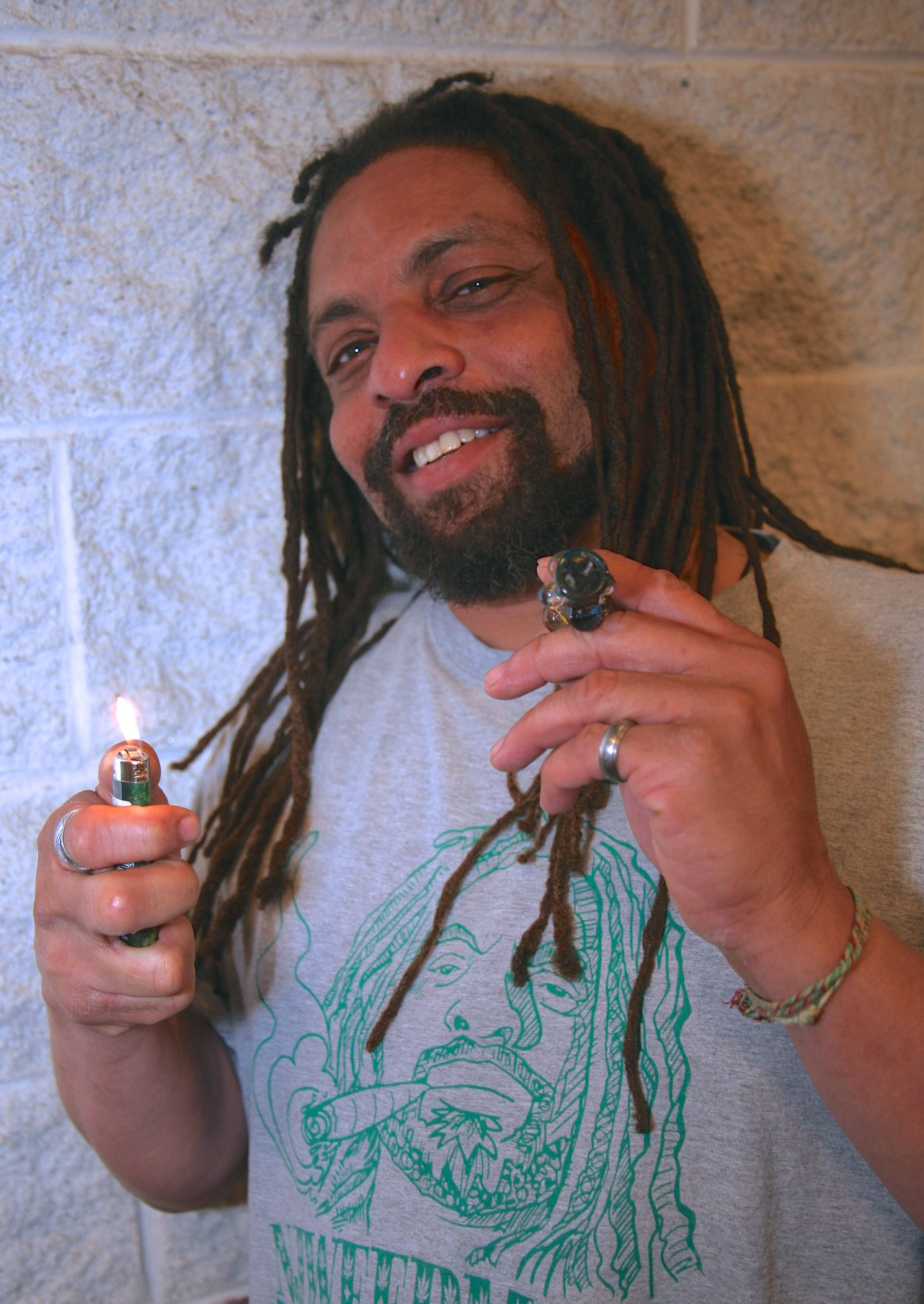
Edward Forchion, in 2019, Legalize Marijuana Party 2005 New Jersey Governor nominee

Forchion was nominated by petition to run for Governor of New Jersey in 2005. He received 9,137 votes. While Forchion was campaigning for governor, his home in Pemberton Township was vandalized, August 25, during the night by someone who spray-painted a 6-foot cross together with the words “Get Jesus.” Burlington County police investigated the incident, calling it a hate crime because Forchion is a person of color. However, Forchion told reporters that he thought he had been targeted because of his

religious beliefs, not because he is African American.

=== Results in gubernatorial elections ===
Year	Candidate	Popular Votes	Percentage
2005	Edward Forchion	9,137	0.4%

== New Jersey election results ==
=== Results in county elections ===
Forchion ran for Camden County Freeholder in 1999, and Burlington County Freeholder in 2000. In a bid for Burlington County Freeholder in 2004, Forchion got 2,932 votes.

=== Results in New Jersey state elections ===
Year	Office	Candidate	Popular Votes	Percentage
1999	NJ General Assembly 8	Edward Forchion	659	1.2%
2011	NJ General Assembly 8	Edward Forchion	1,653	1.9%

=== Results in federal elections ===
Year	Office	Candidate	Popular Votes	Percentage
1998	US Representative 1	Edward Forchion	1,257	1.0%
2000	US Representative 1	Edward Forchion	1,959	0.9%
2006	US Senator	Edward Forchion	11,593	0.5%
2012	US Representative 3	Edward Forchion	1,956	0.6%
2014	US Representative 12	Don Dezarn	1,330	0.9%
2016	US Representative 12	Edward Forchion	6,094	2.1%

== History ==
In 2014, Forchion, otherwise known as NJWeedman, filed a lawsuit in an attempt to get onto the ballot in New Jersey's 3rd congressional district. A judge dismissed the lawsuit.

== See also ==
- Cannabis political parties of the United States
