= John S. Watson (New Jersey politician) =

American politician

John S. Watson (August 14, 1924 – June 15, 1996) was an American Democratic Party politician who served six terms in the New Jersey General Assembly, where he represented the 15th Legislative District.

Born in Camden, Watson served with the United States Merchant Marine fleet during World War II. In 1970, Watson became the first African-American elected to the Board of Chosen Freeholders in Mercer County, New Jersey. In 1977, he became the President of the Board. For 12 years, Watson was a member of the New Jersey State Assembly, where he served as Chairman of the Assembly Appropriations Committee.

The John S. Watson Institute for Public Policy which was initially located at the Rudolph V. Kuser Mansion on the campus of Thomas Edison State University in Trenton, New Jersey was named in his honor. In 2021 the Institute relocated to Kean University.

His daughter Bonnie Watson Coleman went on to serve in what was once his Assembly seat. She is now a member of the United States House of Representatives.
