= History of Camden, New Jersey =

History of Camden, New Jersey starts with the introduction of Quakers into the native lands of the Lenape population in the Delaware Valley. Throughout the city's history there have been times of economic growth and development; as well as stagnation and decline. The City of Camden was named after Camden County, which was named for Charles Pratt, 1st Earl Camden, who was a civil libertarian, promoter of the American cause, and a British judge and lawyer. The city was incorporated on February 13, 1828.

The current demographics show Camden to currently be in a population decline, economic decline, and crime rate decline. Once known for violent crime statistics, Camden has seen a decrease in this number since restructuring their police force. Some major changes that have created economic decline revolve around the history of major employers and their interaction with the local population, the changes war brought to the United States over the decades, changes in the crime rates, and the changing face of population demographics. There is an extensive history of cultural growth that includes a location that was once a stop on the Underground Railroad located at the Macedonia African Methodist Episcopal Church, the grave and home of Walt Whitman, as well as the growth and development of multiple higher-education campuses. In recent years, the development of groups like Camden Community Partnership and Cooper's Ferry Partnership are working in the community for change, including the development of new parks.

Revitalization projects have been met with limited success. Destruction of low-income housing options for business and city development has also limited the availability of housing in the city. The construction of the Ben Franklin Bridge is one event that impacted the face of housing in the northern sections of Camden in the 1920s. Not only was low-income housing destroyed during this construction, but the city was also effectively split by the addition of the highway leading up to the bridge, as well.

As the former home of many manufacturing companies, Camden has had a major impact on the history of the county, state, and country. This impact is such that it has defined itself as a city in its own right and not just a suburb of the larger Philadelphia, which is located just across the Delaware River to the west. Some of the important parts of American history that parallel Camden history include: the changes of gender roles in factories as the war pulled men overseas; the changes of minority demographics as the Civil War moved slavery out of the norm, and civil rights changed the face of segregation; and, finally, the impact of immigration on the populations that settled here and how they grouped together as families and ethnicity groups.

== Early history ==
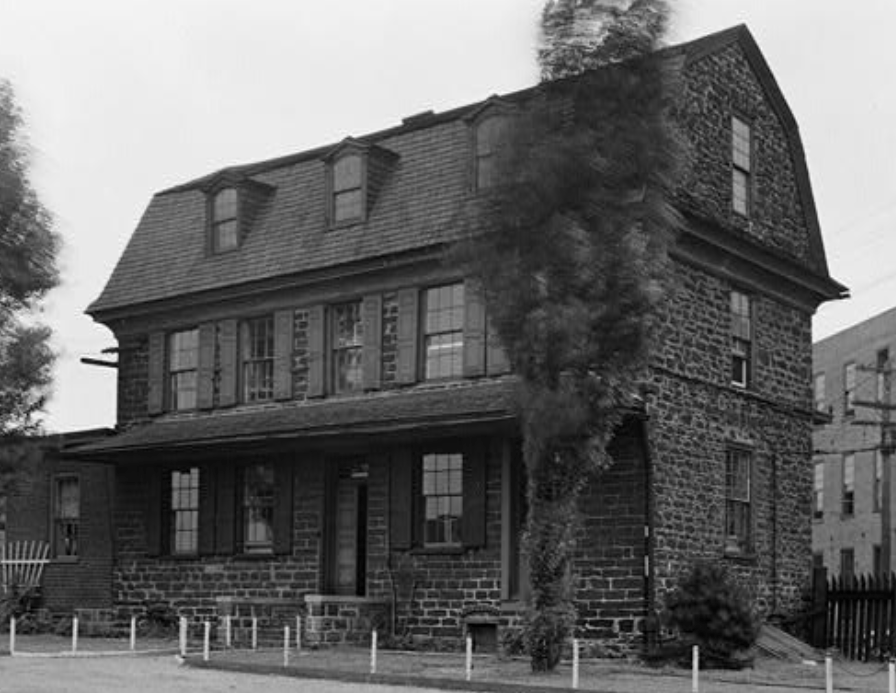
Benjamin Cooper House, built in 1734

In 1626, Fort Nassau was established by the Dutch West India Company at the confluence of Big Timber Creek and the Delaware River. Throughout the 17th century, Europeans settled along the Delaware, competing to control the local fur trade. After the Restoration in 1660, the land around Camden was controlled by nobles serving under King Charles II, until it was sold off to a group of New Jersey Quakers in 1673. The area developed further when a ferry system was established along the east side of the Delaware River to facilitate trade between Fort Nassau and Philadelphia, the growing capital of the Quaker colony of Pennsylvania directly across the river. By the 1700s, Quakers and the Lenni Lenape Native Americans were coexisting. The Quakers' expansion and use of natural resources, in addition to the introduction of alcohol and infectious disease, diminished the Lenape's population in the area.

=== Camden's Earliest Colonial Developers: The Cooper Family ===
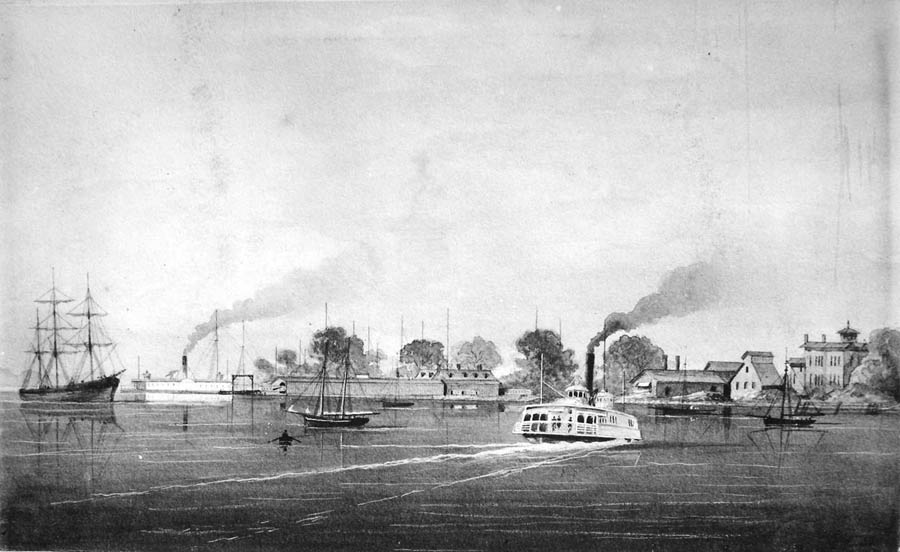
Cooper's Point, 1864

Aside from a period in which some small houses lined the Delaware river near the ferries which carried goods from Western New Jersey to Philadelphia for trade purposes, the first major colonial settlement in the Camden area was established by William Cooper . An English Quaker born in 1632, Cooper emigrated with his wife and children to America in 1679 as a means of avoiding religious persecution in England and with the hopes of participating in the development of a settlement along the Delaware river – a project which was being headed by William Penn, a Quaker leader and fellow member of the Upperside Monthly Meeting of the Society of Friends. Cooper purchased several acres of land in Burlington, New Jersey upon his arrival in 1679 then procured an expanse of land across the Delaware river from Kensington, Philadelphia (then called Shackamaxon) in 1682 and moved himself and his family to Cooper’s Point, where he had his permanent home built.

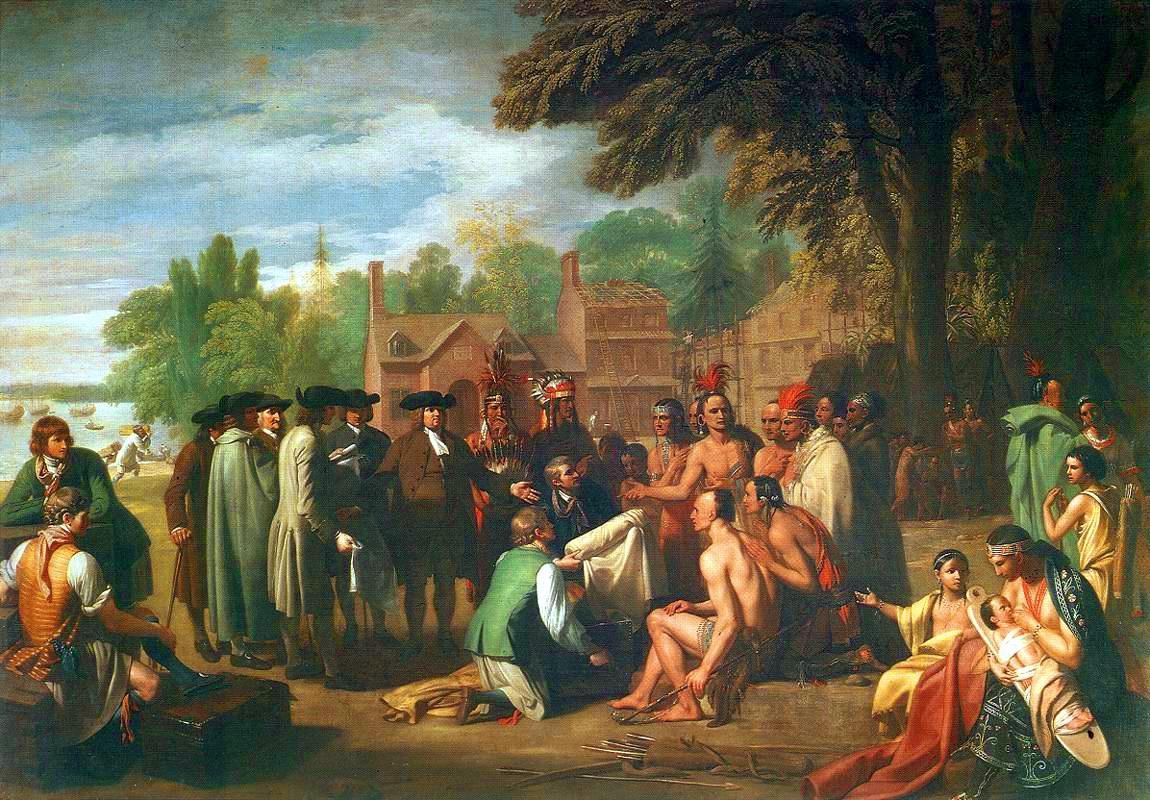
Painting by Benjamin West titled Penn's Treaty with the Indians. Completed in 1772, the painting depicts William Penn's meeting with the Lenni Lenape, where William Cooper is said to have attended.

Throughout the course of his life in the Southern New Jersey area, William Cooper consistently contributed to the transfer and development of land by English and Irish colonial settlers. In 1682, Cooper was said to be present at the Treaty of Penn in which William Penn famously established a vow of friendship with the Native Americans of the area (though the occurrence of this event is disputed and a lack of paper records documenting it has led some to doubt its authenticity). After serving for a number of years as commissioner for the division of lands and acting as an attorney for Quakers interested in purchasing lands surrounding the Delaware river, he was appointed as the judge of the County Court of Gloucester. In 1710, Cooper died in Delaware county. After his death, Cooper’s descendants continued to acquire land and develop it through the construction of farms and buildings that formed the most developed tracts of the entire Southern New Jersey area.

The 1688 order of the County Court of Gloucester that sanctioned ferries between New Jersey and Philadelphia was: "Therefore we permit and appoint that a common passage or ferry for man or beast be provided, fixed and settled in some convenient and proper place between ye mouths or entrance of Cooper's Creek and Newton Creek, and that the government, managing and keeping of ye same be committed to ye said William Roydon and his assigns, who are hereby empowered and appointed to establish, fix and settle ye same within ye limits aforesaid, wherein all other persons are desired and requested to keep no other common or public passage or ferry." The ferry system was located along Cooper Street and was turned over to Daniel Cooper in 1695. Its creation resulted in a series of small settlements along the river, largely established by three families: the Coopers, the Kaighns, and the Mickels, and these lands would eventually be combined to create the future city. Of these, the Cooper family had the greatest impact on the formation of Camden. In 1773, Jacob Cooper developed some of the land he had inherited through his family into a "townsite," naming it Camden after Charles Pratt, the Earl of Camden.

== 19th century ==
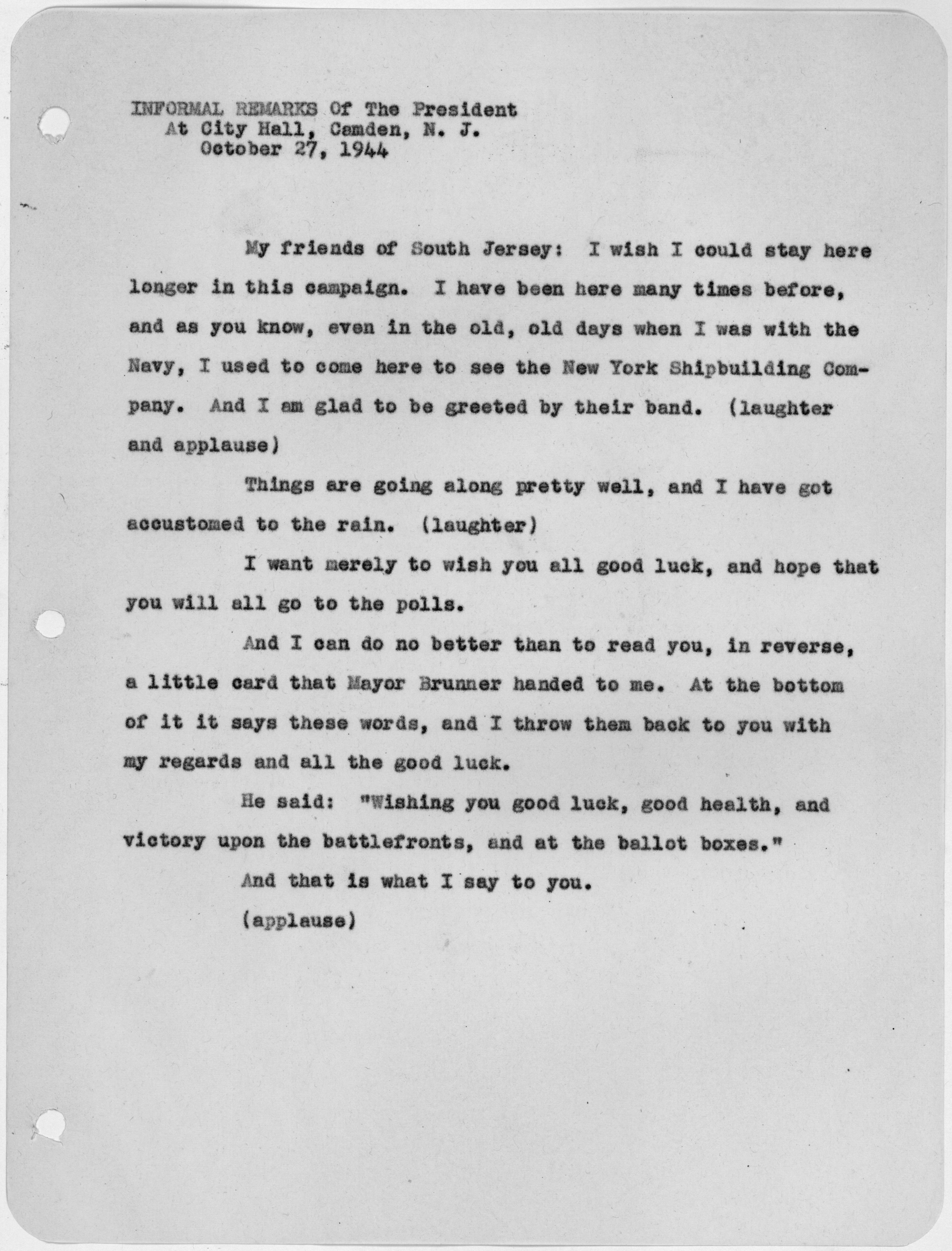
Remarks of FDR during his 1944 Camden visit

For over 150 years, Camden served as a secondary economic and transportation hub for the Philadelphia area. However, that status began to change in the early 19th century. Camden was incorporated as a city on February 13, 1828, from portions of Newton Township, while the area was still part of Gloucester County. In 1832, Camden Township was created as a township coextensive with Camden City. The township existed until it was repealed in 1848.

One of the U.S.'s first railroads, the Camden and Amboy Railroad, was chartered in Camden in 1830. The Camden and Amboy Railroad allowed travelers to travel between New York City and Philadelphia via ferry terminals in South Amboy, New Jersey and Camden. The railroad terminated on the Camden Waterfront, and passengers were ferried across the Delaware River to their final Philadelphia destination. The Camden and Amboy Railroad opened in 1834 and helped to spur an increase in population and commerce in Camden.

Horse ferries, or team boats, served Camden in the early 1800s. The ferries connected Camden and other South Jersey towns to Philadelphia. Ferry systems allowed Camden to generate business and economic growth. "These businesses included lumber dealers, manufacturers of wooden shingles, pork sausage manufacturers, candle factories, coachmaker shops that manufactured carriages and wagons, tanneries, blacksmiths and harness makers." Originally a suburban town with ferry service to Philadelphia, Camden evolved into its own city. Until 1844, Camden was a part of Gloucester County. In 1840 the city's population had reached 3,371 and Camden appealed to state legislature, which resulted in the creation of Camden County in 1844.

The poet Walt Whitman spent his later years in Camden. He bought a house on Mickle Street in March 1884. Whitman spent the remainder of his life in Camden and died in 1892 of a stroke. Whitman was a prominent member of the Camden community at the end of the nineteenth century.

Camden quickly became an industrialized city in the latter half of the nineteenth century. In 1860 Census takers recorded eighty factories in the city and the number of factories grew to 125 by 1870. Camden began to industrialize in 1891 when Joseph Campbell incorporated his business Campbell's Soup. Through the Civil War era Camden gained a large immigrant population which formed the base of its industrial workforce. Between 1870 and 1920 Camden's population grew by 96,000 people due to the large influx of immigrants. Like other industrial cities, Camden prospered during strong periods of manufacturing demand and faced distress during periods of economic dislocation.

== Early 20th century ==
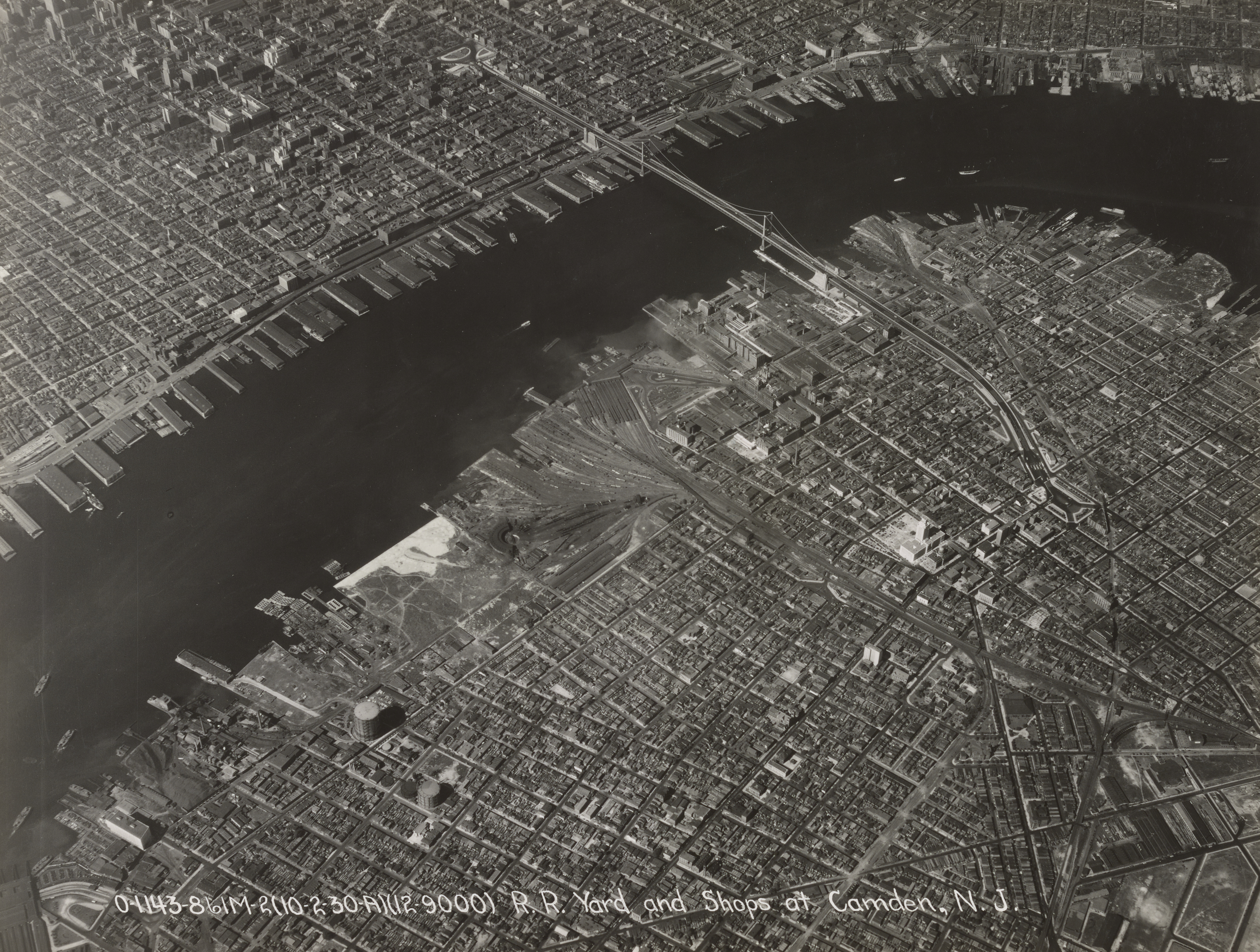
Aerial view of port facilities along the Delaware River, 1931

At the turn of the 20th century, Camden became an industrialized city. At the height of Camden's industrialization, 12,000 workers were employed at RCA Victor, while another 30,000 worked at New York Shipbuilding. Camden Forge Company supplied materials for New York Ship during both world wars. RCA had 23 out of 25 of its factories inside Camden, and the Campbell's was also a major employer. In addition to major corporations, Camden also housed many small manufacturing companies as well as commercial offices.

From 1899 to 1967, Camden was the home of New York Shipbuilding Corporation, which at its World War II peak was the largest and most productive shipyard in the world. Notable naval vessels built at New York Ship include the ill-fated cruiser USS Indianapolis and the aircraft carrier USS Kitty Hawk. In 1962, the first commercial nuclear-powered ship, the NS Savannah, was launched in Camden. The Fairview Village section of Camden (initially Yorkship Village) is a planned European-style garden village that was built by the Federal government during World War I to house New York Shipbuilding Corporation workers.

From 1901 through 1929, Camden was headquarters of the Victor Talking Machine Company, and thereafter to its successor RCA Victor, the world's largest manufacturer of phonographs and phonograph records for the first two-thirds of the 20th century. Victor established some of the first commercial recording studios in Camden where Enrico Caruso, Arturo Toscanini, Sergei Rachmaninoff, Jascha Heifetz, Ignacy Jan Paderewski, Leopold Stokowski, John Philip Sousa, Woody Guthrie, Jimmie Rodgers, Fats Waller and The Carter Family among many others, made famous recordings. General Electric reacquired RCA and the remaining Camden factories in 1986.

In 1919, plans for the Delaware River Bridge were enacted as a means to reduce ferry traffic between Camden and Philadelphia. The bridge was estimated to cost $29 million, but the total cost at the end of the project was $37,103,765.42. New Jersey and Pennsylvania would each pay half of the final cost for the bridge. The bridge was opened at midnight on July 1, 1926. Thirty years later, in 1956 the bridge was renamed to the Benjamin Franklin Bridge.

During the 1930s, Camden faced a decline in economic prosperity due to the Great Depression. By the mid-1930s, the city had to pay its workers in scrip because they could not pay them in currency. Camden's industrial foundation kept the city from going bankrupt. Major corporations such as RCA Victor, Campbell's Soup and New York Shipbuilding Corporation employed close to 25,000 people in Camden through the depression years. New companies were also being created during this time. On June 6, 1933, the city hosted America's first drive-in movie theater.

Between 1929 and 1957, Camden Central Airport was active; during the 1930s, it was Philadelphia's main airport. It was located in Pennsauken Township, on the north bank of the Cooper River. Its terminal building was beside what became known as Airport Circle.

Camden's ethnic demographic shifted dramatically at the beginning of the 20th century. German, British, and Irish immigrants made up the majority of the city at the beginning of the second half of the 19th century. By 1920, Italian and Eastern European immigrants had become the majority of the population. African Americans had also been present in Camden since the 1830s. The migration of African Americans from the south increased during World War II. The different ethnic groups began to form segregated communities within the city and around religious organizations.

== Late 20th century ==
After close to 50 years of economic and industrial growth, the city of Camden experienced a period of economic stagnation and deindustrialization: after reaching a peak of 43,267 manufacturing jobs in 1950, there was an almost continuous decline to a new low of 10,200 manufacturing jobs in the city by 1982. With this industrial decline came a plummet in population: in 1950 there were 124,555 residents, compared to just 84,910 in 1980.

The city experienced white flight, as many White residents left the city for such segregated suburbs as Cherry Hill. In the 1960s, 1,289 families were displaced due the construction of the North-South Freeway, 85% of which were nonwhite families. During the period between 1963 and 1968, there were 100 new low-income units constructed in the city to replace 3,000 such units that had been destroyed, primarily due to freeway construction. The 1970 United States census showed a loss of 15,000 residents, which reflected an increase of almost 50% in the number of Black residents, which grew from 27,700 to 40,000, and a simultaneous decline of 30% in the city's white population, which dropped from 89,000 to 61,000. Cherry Hill saw its population double to 64,000, which was 98.7% White. The city's population, which had been 59.8% White and 39.1% Black in 1970, was 30.6% White, 53.0% Black and 15.7% Other Race in 1980. By 1990, the balance was 19.0% White, 56.4% Black and 22.9% were other races.

The North Camden Civic Association was a "non political organization for the betterment of all the citizens of North Camden." The North Camden Civic Association was involved in representing Camden citizens in a bridge expansion project in 1950 that would create a tunnel on North 6th Street and allow the newly developed Delaware River Joint Commission to take control over $240,000 worth of Camden City ratables. The association described the proposed actions of the Delaware River Commission as "arbitrary and capricious" as the Commission would be given eminent domain over the land and the commission lacked the representation of citizens. The association passed a resolution that would serve to encourage the commission to listen to their demands.

Alongside these declines, civil unrest and criminal activity rose in the city. From 1981 to 1990, mayor Randy Primas fought to renew the city economically. Ultimately Primas had not secured Camden's economic future as his successor, mayor Milton Milan, declared bankruptcy for the city in July 1999, which was withdrawn after the state gave the city more than $60 million in aid and assumed oversight of the city's finances.

=== Industrial decline ===
After World War II, Camden's largest manufacturing companies, RCA Victor and the Campbell's, began decentralizing their production operations. This period of capital flight was a means to regain control from Unionized workers and to avoid the rising labor costs unions demanded from the company. Campbell's kept its corporate headquarters in Camden, but the bulk of its cannery production was done elsewhere after a union worker's strike in 1934; in 1979, locally grown tomatoes from South Jersey were replaced by industrially produced tomato paste from California.

During the 1940s, RCA Victor began to relocate some production to rural Indiana to employ low-wage ethnic Scottish-Irish workers. Since 1968, RCA has employed Mexican workers from Chihuahua.

Camden's largest postwar employer, the New York Shipbuilding Corporation, founded in 1899, shut down in 1967 due to mismanagement, unrest amongst labor workers, construction accidents, and a low demand for shipbuilding.

The opening of the Cherry Hill Mall in 1961 increased Cherry Hill's property value while decreasing Camden's. Enclosed suburban malls, especially ones like Cherry Hill's, which boasted well-lit parking lots and babysitting services, were preferred by white middle-class over Philadelphia's central business district. Cherry Hill became the designated regional retail destination.

Manufacturing companies were not the only businesses that were hit. After they left Camden and outsourced their production, White-collar companies and workers followed suit, leaving for the newly constructed offices of Cherry Hill.

The Concerned Citizens of North Camden became a community advocacy organization in December 1978. The group's stated mission was focused on improving North Camden by protesting for "better housing, cleaner streets, and more jobs; to unify the community across lines of race and national origin..." In April 1979, 50 members of Concerned Citizens of North Camden protested a city council meeting and stated that the city had "demonstrated a lack of commitment to housing by allocating only $1.6 million of the $4.9 million grant for rehabilitation. The Camden City council disagreed. The Concerned Citizens of North Camden were involved in more protests throughout the late 20th century and the organization was reawakened in 2018.

=== Unionization ===
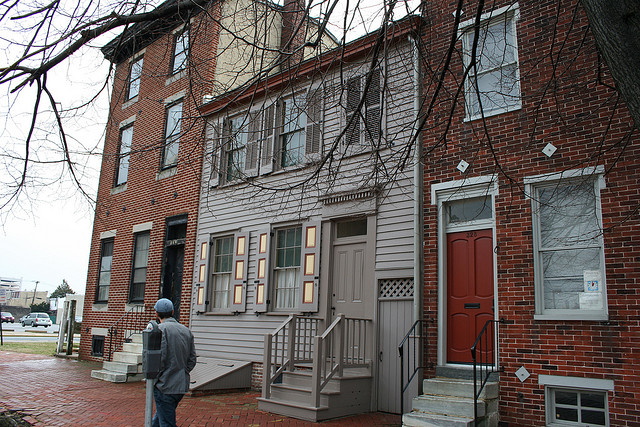
Walt Whitman House in Camden

Approximately ten million cans of soup were produced at Campbell's per day. This put additional stress on cannery workers who already faced dangerous conditions in an outmoded, hot and noisy factory. The Dorrance family, founders of Campbell's, profited while lowering the costs of production.

=== Civil unrest and crime ===
On September 6, 1949, mass murderer Howard Unruh went on a killing spree in his Camden neighborhood killing 13 people. Unruh, who was convicted and subsequently confined to a state psychiatric facility, died on October 19, 2009.

A civilian and a police officer were killed in a September 1969 riot, which broke out in response to accusation of police brutality. Two years later, public disorder returned with widespread riots in August 1971, following the death of a Puerto Rican motorist at the hands of white police officers. When the officers were not charged, Hispanic residents took to the streets and called for the suspension of those involved. The officers were ultimately charged, but remained on the job and tensions soon flared. On the night of August 19, 1971, riots erupted, and sections of Downtown were looted and torched over the next three days. Fifteen major fires were set before order was restored, and ninety people were injured. City officials suspended the officers responsible for the death of the motorist, but they were later acquitted by a jury.

The Camden 28 were a group of anti-Vietnam War activists who, in 1971, planned and executed a raid on the Camden draft board, resulting in a high-profile trial against the activists that was seen by many as a referendum on the Vietnam War in which 17 of the defendants were acquitted by a jury even though they admitted having participated in the break-in.

In 1996, Governor of New Jersey Christine Todd Whitman frisked Sherron Rolax, a 16-year-old African-American youth, an event which was captured in an infamous photograph. Rolax alleged his civil rights were violated and sued the state of New Jersey. His suit was later dismissed.

=== 1980s Revitalization efforts ===
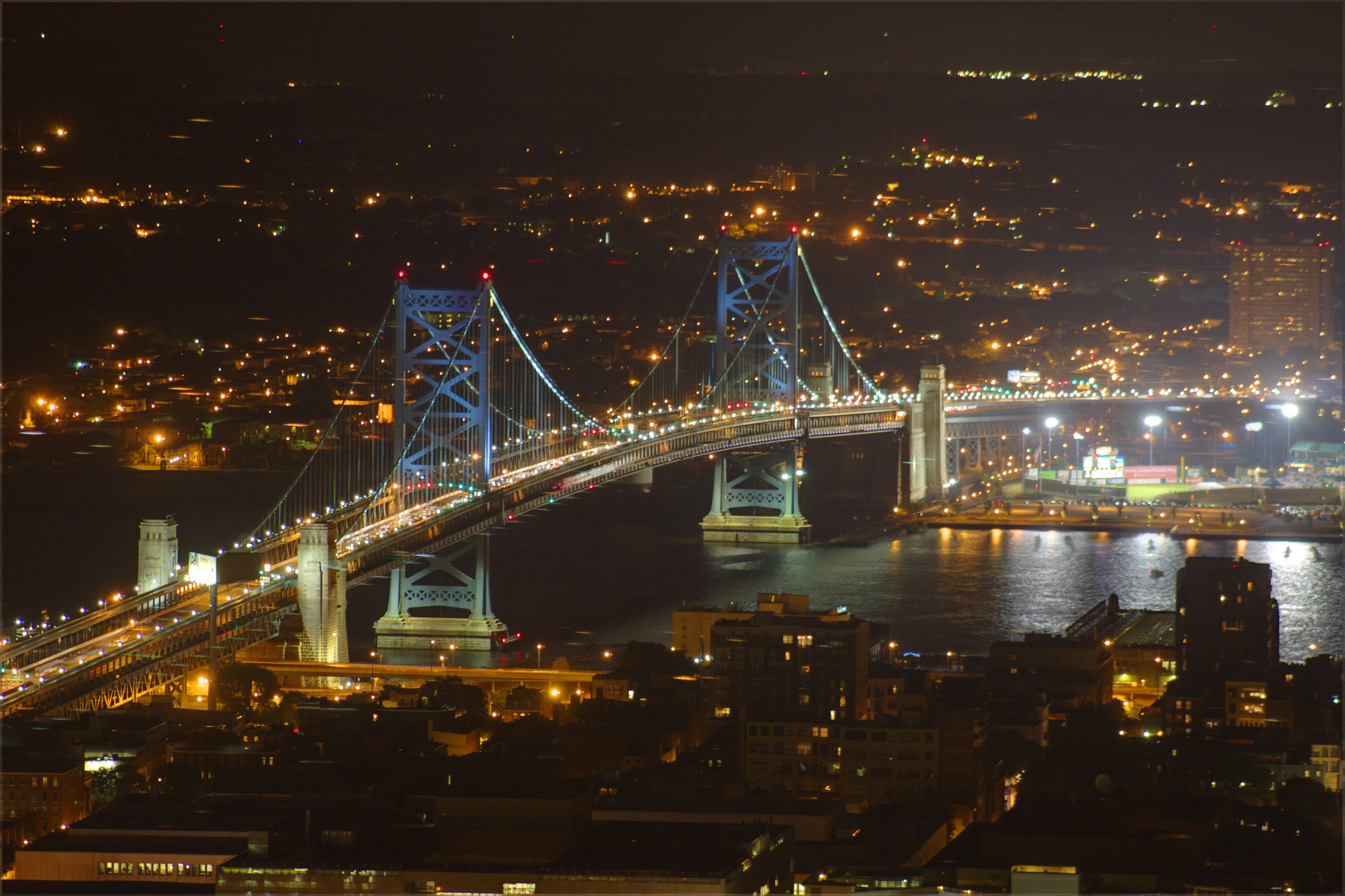
Benjamin Franklin Bridge across the Delaware River, connecting Camden with Philadelphia

In 1981, Randy Primas was elected mayor of Camden, but entered office "haunted by the overpowering legacy of financial disinvestment." Following his election, the state of New Jersey closed the $4.6 million deficit that Primas had inherited, but also decided that Primas should lose budgetary control until he began providing the state with monthly financial statements, among other requirements. When he regained control, Primas had limited options regarding how to close the deficit, and so in an attempt to renew Camden, Primas campaigned for the city to adopt a prison and a trash-to-steam incinerator. While these two industries would provide some financial security for the city, the proposals did not go over well with residents, who overwhelmingly opposed both the prison and the incinerator.

While the proposed prison, which was to be located on the North Camden Waterfront, would generate $3.4 million for Camden, Primas faced extreme disapproval from residents. Many believed that a prison in the neighborhood would negatively affect North Camden's "already precarious economic situation." Primas, however, was wholly concerned with the economic benefits, telling The New York Times, "The prison was a purely economic decision on my part." Eventually, on August 12, 1985, the Riverfront State Prison opened its doors; however, it was closed and demolished in 2009.

Camden residents also objected to the trash-to-steam incinerator, which was another proposed industry. Once again, Primas "...was motivated by fiscal more than social concerns," and he faced heavy opposition from Concerned Citizens of North Camden (CCNC) and from Michael Doyle, who was so opposed to the plant that he appeared on CBS's 60 Minutes, saying "Camden has the biggest concentration of people in all the county, and yet there is where they're going to send in this sewage... ...everytime you flush, you send to Camden, to Camden, to Camden." Despite this opposition, which eventually culminated in protests, "the county proceeded to present the city of Camden with a check for $1 million in March 1989, in exchange for the 18 acres (7.3 ha) of city-owned land where the new facility was to be built... ...The $112 million plant finally fired up for the first time in March 1991."

The Parkside Business and Community In Partnership organization was established as a non-profit corporation in February 1993. The organization's mission is focused on civic engagement, community building, and providing assistance in different forms to disadvantaged residents of the Parkside neighborhood. In October 1991, the Parkside Business and Community In Partnership organization hosted the "Drugs Destroy Dreams March". The organization stated the aim of the march was to "reclaim the streets and to build upon the success of recent block parties and cleanups that have sparked Parkside's civic pride." The PBCIP is still active in the city of Camden and continues to support Camden citizens in various ways.

Since the early 2000s, Camden has seen a large increase in development and investment. Riverfront State Prison was torn down in 2009, replaced with walking trails and a park. The former RCA Victor building was purchased by the Dranoff Company, a Philadelphia-based developer and converted into market rate apartments. Another market rate apartment complex and hotel followed in the 2010s, and Rutgers University and Rowan University have expanded their campuses over the 2010s and 2020s. Development has focused primarily on the waterfront and university/downtown areas; however, Subaru moved their North American headquarters from Cherry Hill to Camden in a new campus on Admiral Wilson Boulevard in 2018, having been granted $118 million in tax incentives in exchange for a commitment to create 100 new jobs over the next decade.

=== Other notable events ===
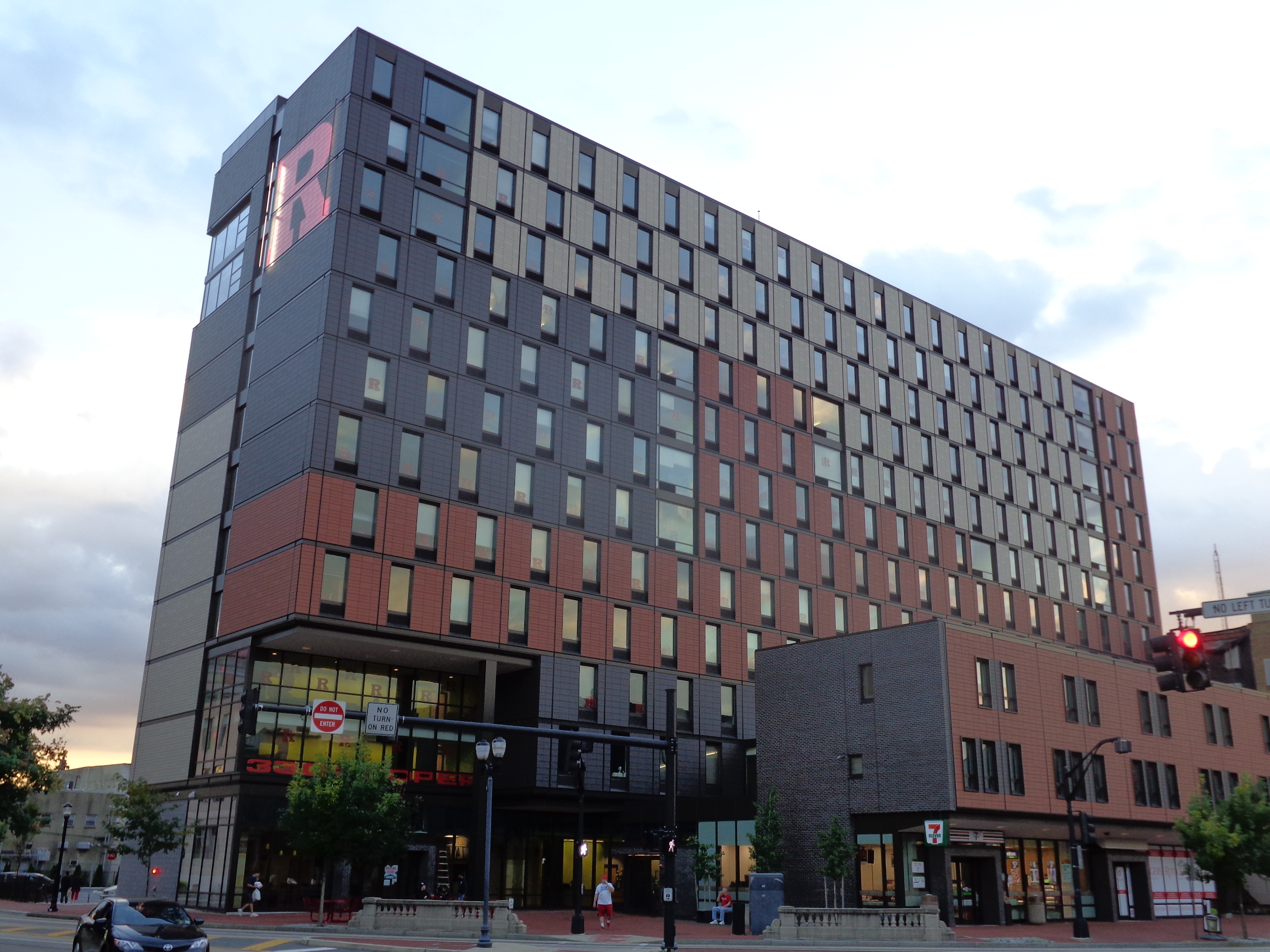
Rutgers University–Camden dormitories at 330 Cooper Street

Despite the declines in industry and population, other changes to the city took place during this period:

- In 1950, Rutgers University absorbed the former College of South Jersey to create Rutgers University–Camden.
- In 1992, the state of New Jersey under the Florio administration made an agreement with GE to ensure that GE would not close the remaining buildings in Camden. The state of New Jersey would build a new high-tech facility on the site of the old Campbell's factory and trade these new buildings to GE for the existing old RCA Victor buildings. Later, the new high tech buildings would be sold to Martin Marietta. In 1994, Martin Marietta merged with Lockheed to become Lockheed Martin. In 1997, Lockheed Martin divested the old Victor Camden Plant as part of the birth of L-3 Communications.
- In 1999, Camden was selected as the location for the USS New Jersey (BB-62). That ship remains in Camden.

== 21st century ==
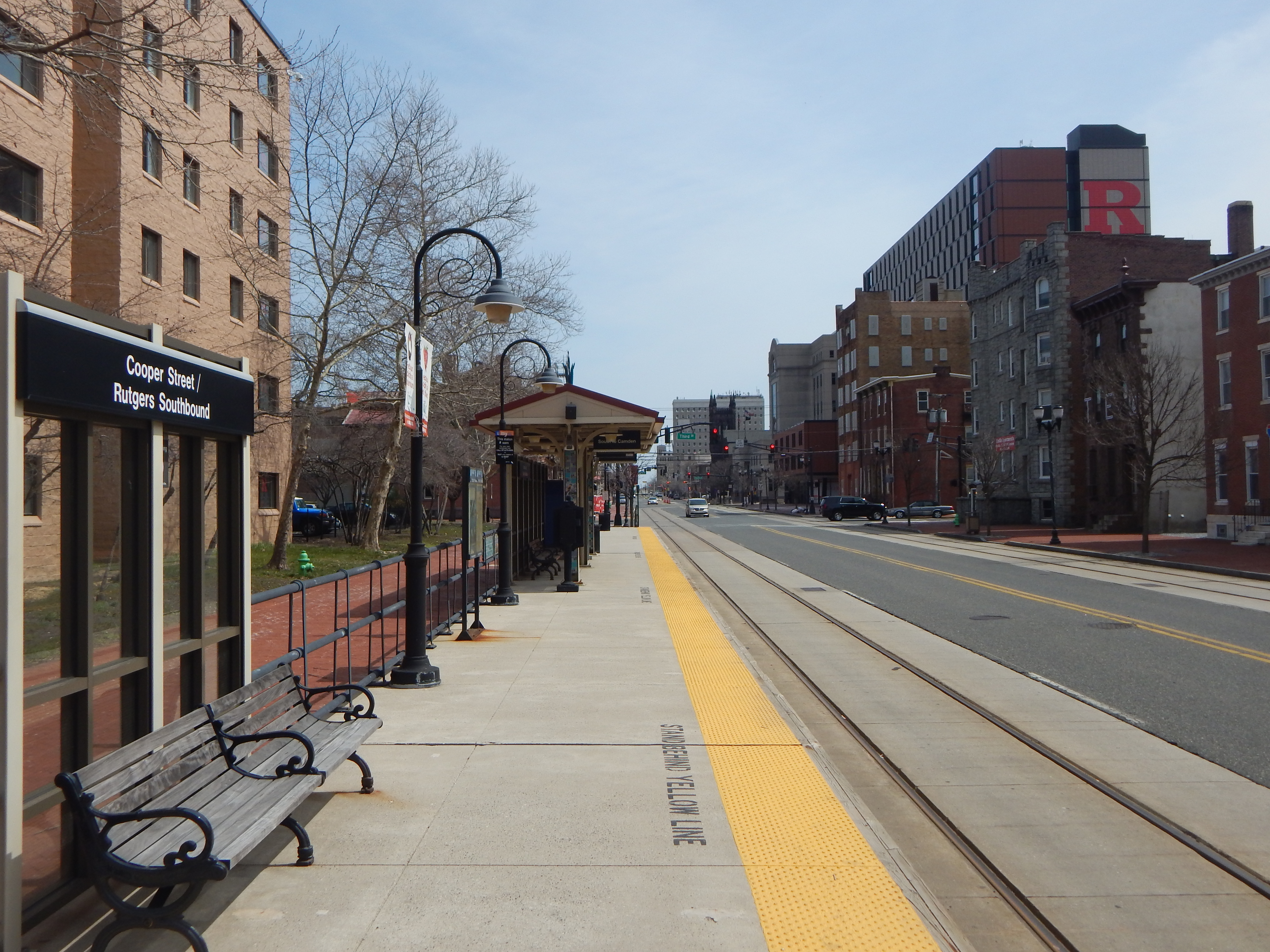
The River Line's Cooper Street–Rutgers University station stop

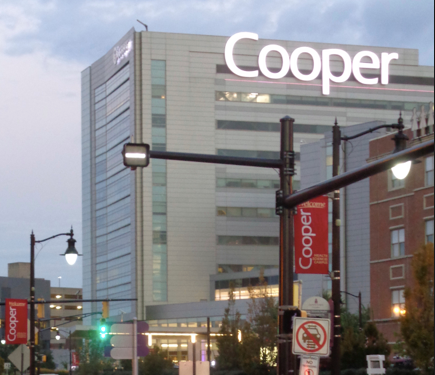
Cooper University Hospital

Originally the city's main industry was manufacturing, and in recent years Camden has shifted its focus to education and medicine in an attempt to revitalize itself. Of the top employers in Camden, many are education and/or healthcare providers: Cooper University Hospital, Cooper Medical School of Rowan University, Rowan University, Rutgers University-Camden, Camden County College, Virtua, Our Lady of Lourdes Medical Center, and CAMcare. The eds and meds industry itself is the single largest source of jobs in the city: 7,500 (30%) of the roughly 25,000 jobs in the city. The second-largest source of jobs in Camden is the retail trade industry, which provides roughly 3,000 (12%) jobs. While already the largest employer in the city, the eds and meds industry in Camden is growing and is doing so despite falling population and total employment: From 2000 to 2014, population and total employment in Camden fell by 3% and 10% respectively, but eds and meds employment grew by 67%.

Despite previous failures to transform the Camden Waterfront, in September 2015 Liberty Property Trust and Mayor Dana Redd announced an $830 million plan to rehabilitate the Waterfront. The project, which is the biggest private investment in the city's history, aims to redevelop 26 acres (11 ha) of land south of the Ben Franklin Bridge and includes plans for 1,500,000 square feet (140,000 m^{2}) of commercial space, 211 residences, a 130-room hotel, more than 4,000 parking spaces, a downtown shuttle bus, a new ferry stop, a riverfront park, and two new roads. The project is a modification of a previous $1 billion proposal by Liberty Property Trust, which would have redeveloped 37.2 acres (15.1 ha) and would have included 500,000 square feet (46,000 m^{2}) of commercial space, 1,600 homes, and a 140-room hotel. On March 11, 2016, the New Jersey Economic Development Authority approved the modified plans and officials like Timothy J. Lizura of the NJEDA expressed their enthusiasm: "It's definitely a new day in Camden. For 20 years, we've tried to redevelop that city, and we finally have the traction between a very competent mayor's office, the county police force, all the educational reforms going on, and now the corporate interest. It really is the right ingredient for changing a paradigm which has been a wreck."

In preparation for the 2000 Republican National Convention in Philadelphia, various strip clubs, hotels, and other businesses along Admiral Wilson Boulevard were torn down in 1999, and a park that once existed along the road was replenished.

In 2004, conversion of the old RCA Victor Building 17 to The Victor, an upscale apartment building was completed. The same year, the River LINE, between the Entertainment Center at the Waterfront in Camden and the Transit Center in Trenton, was opened, with a stop directly across from The Victor.

In 2010, massive police corruption was exposed that resulted in the convictions of several policemen, dismissals of 185 criminal cases, and lawsuit settlements totaling $3.5 million that were paid to 88 victims. On May 1, 2013, the Camden Police Department was dissolved and the newly formed Camden County Police Department took over full responsibility for policing the city.

In 2013, the New Jersey Economic Development Authority created the New Jersey Economic Opportunity Act, which provides incentives for companies to relocate to or remain in economically struggling locations in the state. These incentives largely come in the form of tax breaks, which are payable over 10 years and are equivalent to a project's cost. According to The New York Times, "...the program has stimulated investment of about $1 billion and created or retained 7,600 jobs in Camden." This NJEDA incentive package has been used by organizations and firms such as the Philadelphia 76ers, Subaru of America, Lockheed Martin, and Holtec International.

Despite previous failures to transform the Camden Waterfront, in September 2015 Liberty Property Trust and Mayor Dana Redd announced an $830 million plan to rehabilitate the Waterfront. The project, which is the biggest private investment in the city's history, aims to redevelop 26 acres (11 ha) of land south of the Ben Franklin Bridge and includes plans for 1,500,000 square feet (140,000 m^{2}) of commercial space, 211 residences, a 130-room hotel, more than 4,000 parking spaces, a downtown shuttle bus, a new ferry stop, a riverfront park, and two new roads. The project is a modification of a previous $1 billion proposal by Liberty Property Trust, which would have redeveloped 37.2 acres (15.1 ha) and would have included 500,000 square feet (46,000 m^{2}) of commercial space, 1,600 homes, and a 140-room hotel. On March 11, 2016, the New Jersey Economic Development Authority approved the modified plans and officials like Timothy J. Lizura of the NJEDA expressed their enthusiasm: "It's definitely a new day in Camden. For 20 years, we've tried to redevelop that city, and we finally have the traction between a very competent mayor's office, the county police force, all the educational reforms going on, and now the corporate interest. It really is the right ingredient for changing a paradigm which has been a wreck."

In late 2014 the Philadelphia 76ers broke ground in Camden (across the street from the BB&T Pavilion) to construct a new 125,000-square-foot (11,600 m^{2}) training complex. The Philadelphia 76ers Training Complex includes an office building and a 66,230-square-foot (6,153 m^{2}) basketball facility with two regulation-size basketball courts, a 2,800-square-foot (260 m^{2}) locker room, and a 7,000-square-foot (650 m^{2}) roof deck. The $83 million complex had its grand opening on September 23, 2016, and was expected to provide 250 jobs for the city of Camden. Also in late 2014, Subaru of America announced that in an effort to consolidate their operations, their new 250,000-square-foot (23,000 m^{2}) headquarters would be located in Camden. The $118 million project broke ground in December 2015 but was put on hold in mid-2016 because the original plans for the complex had sewage and waste water being pumped into an outdated sewage system. Adjustments to the plans were made and the project was expected to be completed in 2017, creating up to 500 jobs in the city upon completion. The building was completed in April 2018. The company also said that it would donate 50 cherry trees to the city and aim to follow a "zero landfill" policy in which all waste from the offices would be either reduced, reused, or recycled. In 2024, the facility employs 11 Camden residents. Additionally, the 76ers have proposed a $1.3 billion sports arena to be constructed just outside China Town, Philadelphia. The facility would be constructed on Market Street, measuring 125,000 square-feet equipped with training centers and corporate offices.

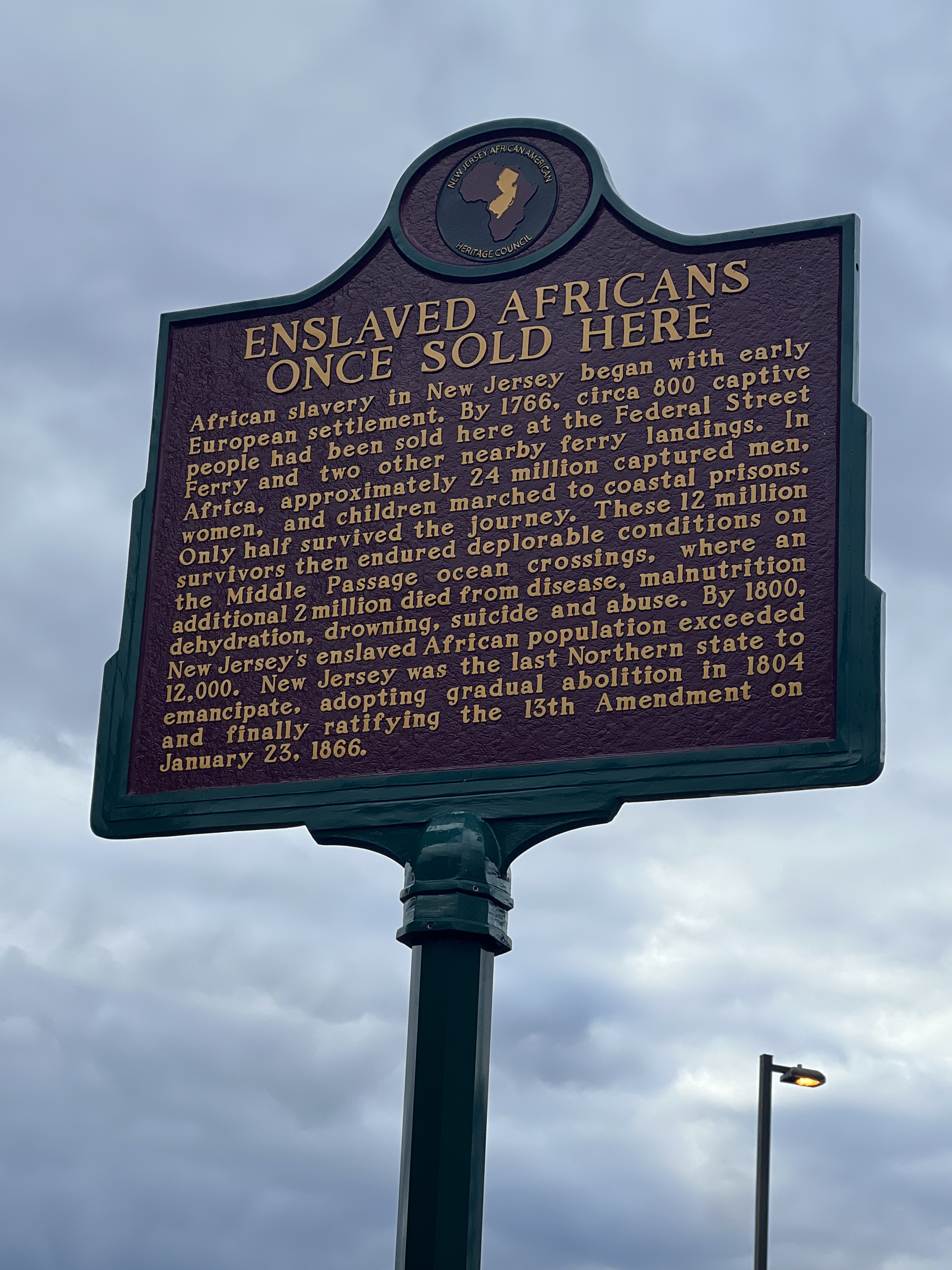
Enslaved Africans Once Sold Here Marker at Federal Street Ferry Site

On November 27, 2017, The Camden County Historical Society unveiled a series of markers to be placed at sites in the city of Camden where enslaved Africans were once sold. The markers are located in Camden at Cooper Poynt Park, on Federal Street, and on Cooper and Front Street. The Camden County Historical Society has accounted for more than 800 enslaved people disembarked from ships at the Camden Waterfront. The three ferries in Camden were the sites of slave auctions that introduced 300 new enslaved people to New Jersey and Pennsylvania. The ferries that docked at Cooper and Front Street typically carried minor groups of male and female enslaved people and previously owned single slaves. Ferries were an integral aspect of the development of the city of Camden as they lead to the formation of small towns. These small towns would consist of stores, warehouses, and hotels that would further develop into full cities like Camden.

In September 2018, a project was announced to revitalize a 1.5-acre lot on Haddon Avenue and Pine Street. The Counties Improvement Authority stated in their request, the goal was to keep housing at a market-rate affordable price. Bert's Pizza notably resides on Block 1471, the scheduled block for redevelopment. Owner Vito Brasile told news that he was unaware of the construction plans and wants his store to stay in its location.

Subsequently in August 2018, Camden County began the project of restructuring traffic patterns near Block 1471, on Haddon Avenue and Pine St/Mount Ephraim. Officials stated that this $850,00 project could potentially bring a light rail station to the area. As of 2024, the nearest light rail station resides in the Waterfront Entertainment Center,1.2 miles from the site of development.

In September 2018, it was announced that Campbell's Waterfront Ballpark would be demolished. The park was built in 2001 and demolished in 2019. The Camden County Improvement Authority took bids for the lot in an effort to increase waterfront tourism. Jim Walsh of The Courier Post commented "Bidding documents makes clear that razing the past is a time-honored tradition at the Delaware Avenue site", referring to the Waterfront Lot. In May 2020, Rutgers-Camden's Athletic Complex was constructed on the lot. The $16 million project was funded by Camden County, the Rowan University-Rutgers Camden Board of Governors and Rutgers-Camden. The Investment brought fields for soccer, lacrosse, and baseball, along with a track, new lighting, and clubhouse (with lockers, restrooms, and training spaces).

As of 2019, numerous projects were underway downtown and along Rutgers-Camden the waterfront, with a market-rate apartment complex and hotel opening in early 2020.

In December 2020, Camden’s first comprehensive Park plan was announced, expected to take up to 30 years to complete. This project was motivated by the 10 minute walk campaign. The plan took over 500 shareholders and community members to create, along with Cooper's Ferry Partnership, Trust for Public Land, Camden City, Camden County and its Municipal Utilities Authority. Since its inception it has been signed off by over a dozen New Jersey mayors as well as Philadelphia Mayor Jim Kenny. The project has been funded $100 million and additional investments are expected to come in 2025.

In February 2020, Camden City Officials announced that Camden’s Branch Village reconstruction was nearly complete. The $120 million redevelopment of the Clemen T. Branch housing complex will bring 250 new units, being meant for senior citizens and low-income families. Since then ....

In June 2021, A 35 million redevelopment of all 307 units in Ablett Village, Camden's oldest complex, was announced to be near completion. The money was received through the CHOICE Neighborhood Implementation grant. The renovated complex will bring a community center, playground, facilities, walking trails, and a community garden. The project was motivated by the statistic that 40% of Ablett Village’s residents are below the federal poverty line. Maria Fudge, The U.S. Secretary of Housing and Urban Development endorsed the execution of the grant, stating that it is potentially life-changing.

In 2022, Camden County was funded 116 million towards it education program. This money was for post pandemic relief, being put towards after school activities, renovation of building facilities, and the support of staff/students mental health. The Philadelphia based non-profit, 12 plus, placed 10 staff into Camden's School District, specializing in post-graduation goal setting. This program was part of the National Partnership for Student Success. Michael Cardona, the US Secretary of Education commented "Camden City School District’s college and career readiness program exemplifies how schools can help students rebound from the pandemic and thrive after graduation".

Also in 2022, a $2 billion expansion of Cooper University Hospital was announced, which was expected to take about a decade to complete.
