= Political corruption in Camden, New Jersey =

Throughout the history of Camden, New Jersey, there have been several political corruption scandals that have engulfed the city and, at times, the nation. Three Camden mayors have been jailed for corruption: Angelo Errichetti, Arnold Webster, and Milton Milan. One other mayor of Camden, Dana Redd, was indicted alongside George Norcross, longtime Democratic Party powerbroker in corruption charges in 2024.

== Convicted Mayors of Camden ==
=== Angelo Errichetti and the Abscam Scandal ===
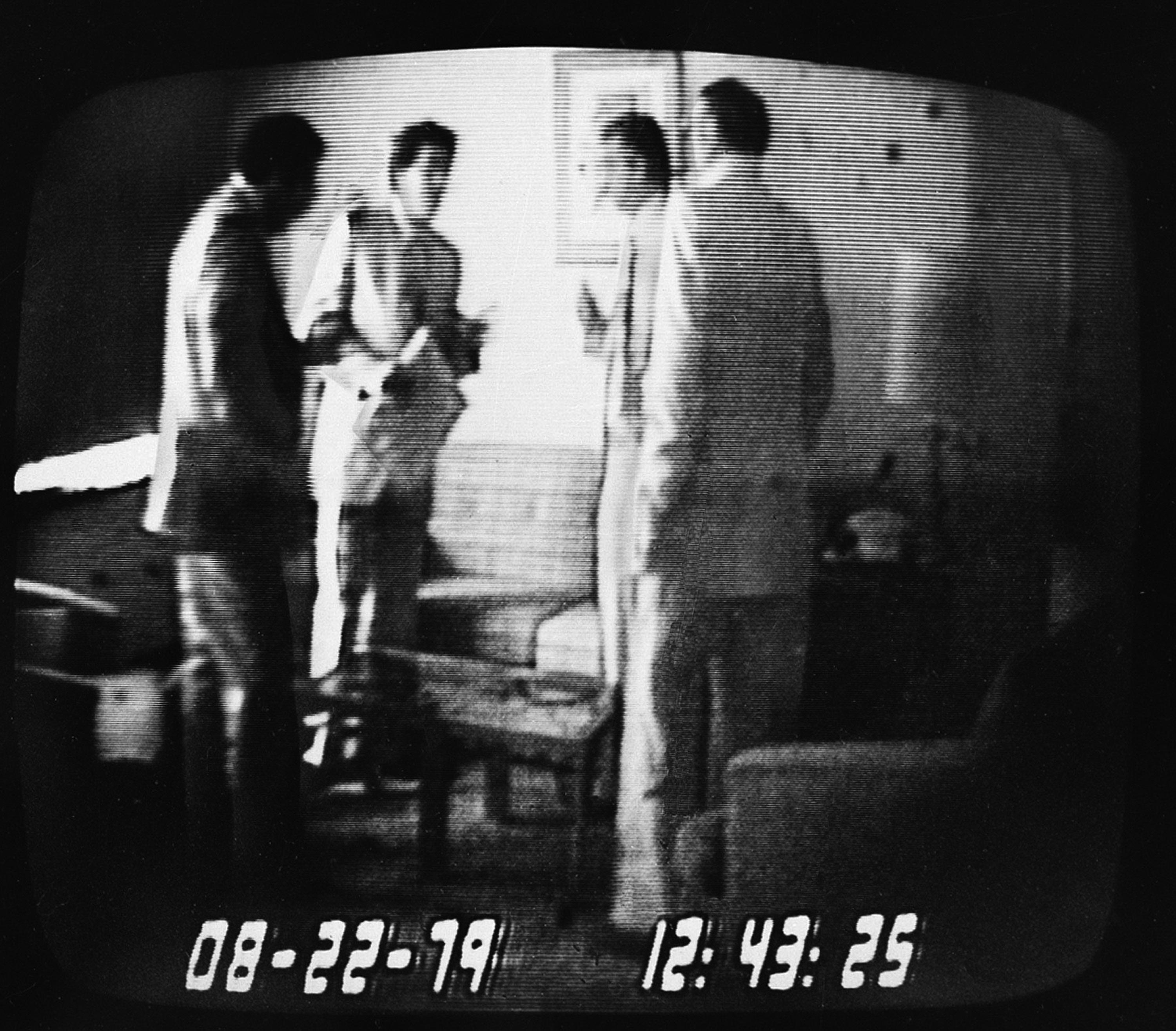
U.S. Representative Michael Myers, second from left, holds an envelope containing $50,000 that he just received from undercover FBI Agent Anthony Amoroso, left. Also shown in the photo are Angelo Errichetti, second from right, and convicted con man Mel Weinberg.

Errichetti first got wrapped in the Abscam when he accepted a bribe to help obtain gambling licenses in Atlantic City for Abdul Enterprises. He was largely responsible for introducing the Abdul Enterprises to the political world. He introduced Abdul Enterprises to Senator Harrison Williams of New Jersey. He then also introduced Michael Myers and Raymond Lederer, both Democrat US representatives in Pennsylvania. He also introduced the company to Frank Thompson Jr. to the company. By 1979, he had arranged several meetings between the company and several local, state, and national politicians that were willing to be involived in the operation. In 1981, Errichetti was convicted with three others for accepting a $50,000 bribe from FBI undercover agents in exchange for helping a non-existent Arab sheikh enter the United States. The FBI scheme was part of the Abscam operation. The 2013 film American Hustle is a fictionalized portrayal of this scheme.

=== Arnold Webster ===
In 1999, Webster, who was previously the superintendent of Camden City Public Schools, pleaded guilty to illegally paying himself $20,000 in school district funds after he became mayor.

=== Milton Milan ===
In 2001, Milan was sentenced to more than six years in federal prison for accepting payoffs from associates of Philadelphia organized crime boss Ralph Natale, soliciting bribes and free home renovations from city vendors, skimming money from a political action committee, and laundering drug money.

== 2024 Corruption Scandal ==
=== Dana Redd ===
Dana Redd was Mayor of Camden from 2010 to 2018. In 2024, she was indicted alongside George Norcross under charges of racketeering accused of using her office to help obtain waterfront properties and development rights for the benefit of George Norcross and businesses that he associates.

=== George Norcross ===
Norcross has argued that his developments and projects have benefited the city and people of Camden while many residents have protested otherwise.

== Wayne R. Bryant ==
The Courier-Post dubbed former State Senator Wayne R. Bryant, who represented the state's 5th Legislative District from 1995 to 2008, the "king of double dipping" for accepting no-show jobs in return for political benefits. In 2009, Bryant was sentenced to four years in federal prison for funneling $10.5 million to the University of Medicine and Dentistry of New Jersey (UMDNJ) in exchange for a no-show job and accepting fraudulent jobs to inflate his state pension and was assessed a fine of $25,000 and restitution to UMDNJ in excess of $110,000. In 2010, Bryant was charged with an additional 22 criminal counts of bribery and fraud, for taking $192,000 in false legal fees in exchange for backing redevelopment projects in Camden, Pennsauken Township and the New Jersey Meadowlands between 2004 and 2006.
