= Arts and entertainment in Camden, New Jersey =

The arts and entertainment industry has always been prominent in the city of Camden, New Jersey. In the early 20th century, Camden became a hub of music and innovation in entertainment with the presence of the Victor Talking Machine Company (later RCA Victor). It is the birthplace of celebrities such as tragic star Russ Columbo; singer and Broadway actress Lola Falana. Today, Camden is home to individuals and groups that help bolster the arts in the city.

== History ==
Starting on February 16, 2012, Camden's Waterfront began an art crawl and volunteer initiative called Third Thursday in an effort to support local Camden business and restaurants. Part of Camden's art crawl movement exists in Studio Eleven One, a fully restored 1906 firehouse opened in 2011 that operated as an art gallery owned by William and Ronja Butlers. William Butler and Studio Eleven One are a part of his wife's company Thomas Lift LLC, self-described as a "socially conscious company" that works to connect Camden's art scene with philanthropic organizations.

Starting in 2014, Camden began Connect The Lots, a community program designed to revitalize unused areas for community engagement. Connect the Lots was founded through The Kresge Foundation, and the project "seeks to create temporary, high-quality, safe outdoor spaces that are consistently programmed with local cultural and recreational activities". Other partnerships with the Connect the Lots foundation include the Cooper's Ferry Partnership, a private non-profit corporation dedicated to urban renewal. Connect the Lots' main work are their 'Pop up Parks' that they create around Camden. In 2014, Connect The Lots created a pop up skate park for Camden youth with assistance from Camden residents as well as students. As of 2016, the Connect the Lots program free programs have expanded to include outdoor yoga and free concerts.

Various murals have been painted throughout the city of the years. The City Invincible mural, now named Camden Invincible, was made and installed at the intersection of 16th Street and Admiral Wilson Boulevard in 2017. It was inspired by Walt Whitman who created the poem “I’d Dream in a Dream” in 1867. The mural was painted by five local artists: Terina Nicole Hill, Priscilla Rios, Breiner Garcia, Donald T. Williams, and Erik James Montgomery with help from the Camden Community Partnership. They even showed remorse rather than anger when it got vandalized, but thankfully the Invincible mural was cleaned up to its original state. Another mural was recently made by a group of artists called We Live Here Artists Collective of Camden. It was installed on the Bush Refrigeration building on Admiral Wilson Boulevard at 17th Street, next to the City Invincible mural. This was done to commemorate the accomplishments of those who lived in Camden such as Reverend Robert "Father Bob" McDermott, running back Mike Rozier, and activist Rosa Ramirez in addition to the town's scenery.

In October 2014, Camden finished construction of the Kroc Center, a Salvation Army funded community center located in the Cramer Hill neighborhood at an 85-acre former landfill which closed in 1971. The Kroc Center's mission is to provide both social services to the people of Camden as well as community engagement opportunities. The center was funded by a $59 million donation from Joan Kroc, and from the Salvation Army. Camden Mayor Dana Redd on the opening of the center called it "the crown jewel of the city." The Kroc Center offers an 8-lane, 25-yard competition pool, a children's water park, various athletic and entertainment options, as well as an in center chapel.

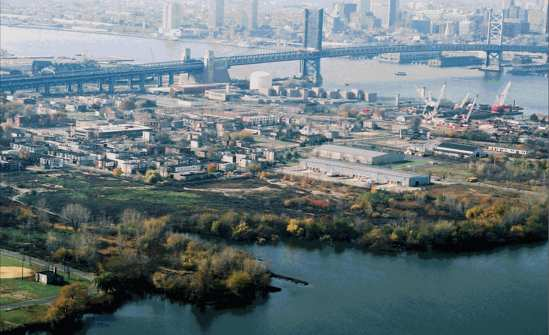
The Camden Waterfront is known for hosting numerous concerts, festivals, and other events. Additionally, it is also home to the Adventure Aquarium and many shipyards.

Other businesses include the Camden County Historical Society, which has documented every event in town, and the Heart of Camden, known as the city's landmark that has hosted many festivities. They even helped provide townspeople a place for them to spend their time with their friends and families.

In September 2020, the IDEA Center for the Arts in downtown Camden was completed. The building provides a space for arts and entertainment, specifically for youth in the community. The center supports artists, painters, dancers, musicians, filmmakers, actors, poets, and more. The Michaels Organization renovated what was previously a storefront at no cost. Subaru of America donated facilities and funding. The center is equipped with recording equipment, computers, a stage, and other amenities. The center regularly hosts events with community members. Numerous people involved on the project and community members praised the opening, with Mayor Frank Moran stating "Camden is finally giving Philly something to look at".

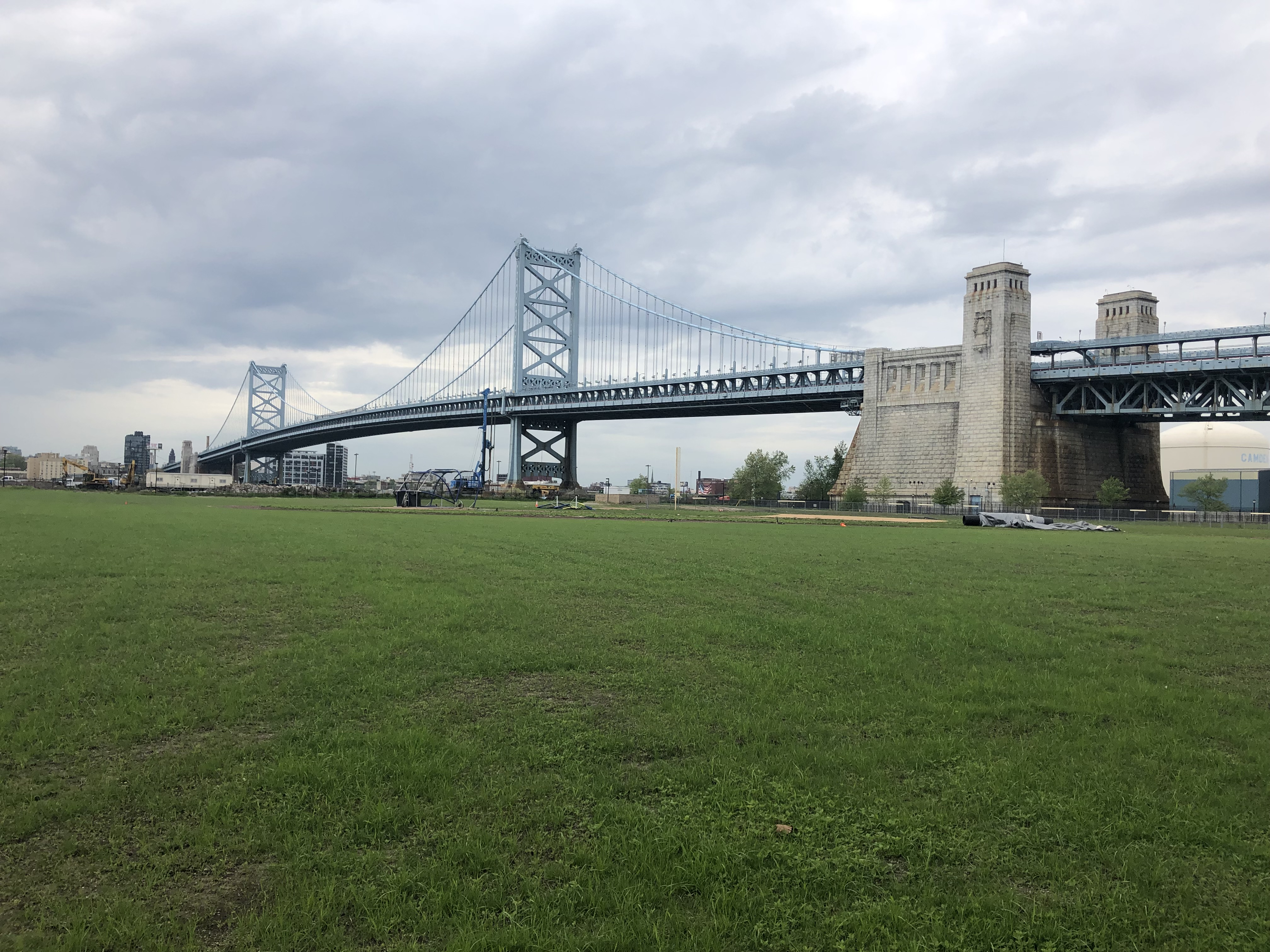
The demolished site of Campbell's Field as seen in 2018. It is now the home of Rutgers-Camden's athletic complex built in 2021.

The Camden Waterfront, which is home to the Adventure Aquarium and Rutgers University-Camden's new athletic complex installed in 2022 to replace the former Campbell's Field, has been designated for concerts that have taken place for bands and musicians to perform, such as Aimee Mann, Sheila E., Hootie & the Blowfish, and many more. The Symphony in C orchestra is based at Rutgers University-Camden. Established as the Haddonfield Symphony in 1952, the organization was renamed and relocated to Camden in 2006.

Additionally, many other festivals have been created for everyone to learn about them. The annual South Jersey Caribbean Festival, founded by Nkem Tshombe, which celebrates Caribbean culture, traditions, and heritage. Another is the Camden County Cultural and Heritage Commission Host Grant Award Breakfast, which brings together 20 cultural organizations for the community. Both of these events have benefited the town financially and socially.
