= Redevelopment of Camden, New Jersey =

Efforts to revitalize Camden began in 1980 with Mayor Randy Primas. In an attempt to generate income for the city, he pursued initiatives such as the construction of a riverfront state-prison and a trash-to-steam incinerator which received substantial opposition from residents. With the election of Milton Milan as Camden's next mayor, he declared the city bankrupt, which resulted in $60 million of aid and the state's assumption of Camden's finances. Another notable revitalization effort was the establishment of non-profit organization, The Parkside Business and Community In Partnership, which occurred in 1993 and is active today.

For the past 40 years, there have been many efforts made to the ease ailing economic health of Camden, New Jersey. The state of New Jersey has awarded more than $1.65 billion in tax credits to more than 20 businesses through the New Jersey Economic Opportunity Act. Corporate beneficiaries of the tax credits include Subaru, Lockheed Martin, American Water, Holtec. and others.

== Description ==
Campbell Soup Company decided to go forward with a scaled-down redevelopment of the area around its corporate headquarters in Camden, including an expanded corporate headquarters. In June 2012, Campbell Soup Company acquired the 4-acre (1.6 ha) site of the vacant Sears building located near its corporate offices, where the company plans to construct the Gateway Office Park, and razed the Sears building after receiving approval from the city government and the New Jersey Department of Environmental Protection.

Lockheed Martin was awarded $107 million in tax breaks, from the Economic Redevelopment Agency, to move to Camden. Lockheed rents 50,000 square feet (4,600 m^{2}) of the L-3 communications building in Camden. Lockheed Martin invested $146.4 million into their Camden Project According to the Economic Redevelopment Agency. Lockheed stated that without these tax breaks they would have had to eliminate jobs.

In 2013, Camden received $59 million from the Kroc estate to be used in the construction of a new community center and another $10 million was raised by the Salvation Army to cover the remaining construction costs. The Ray and John Kroc Corps Community Center, opened in 2014, is a 120,000 square foot community center with an 8,000 square foot water park and a 60 ft ceiling. The community center also contains a food pantry, a computer lab, a black box theater, a chapel, two pools, a gym, an outdoor track and field, a library with reading rooms, and both indoor and outdoor basketball courts.

In 2015 Holtec was given $260 million over the course of 10-years to open up a 600,000-square-foot campus in Camden. Holtec stated that they plan to hire at least 1000 employees within the first year of them opening their doors in Camden. According to the Economic Development Agency, Holtec is slated to bring in $155,520 in net benefit to the state by moving to Camden, but in this deal, Holtec has no obligation to stay in Camden after its 10-year tax credits run out. Holtec's reports stated that the construction of the building would cost $260 million which would be equivalent to the tax benefits they received.

In fall 2017 Rutgers University–Camden Campus opened up their Nursing and Science Building. Rutgers spent $62.5 million to build their 107,000-square-foot building located at 5th and Federal St. This building houses their physics, chemistry, biology and nursing classes along with nursing simulation labs.

In November 2017, Francisco "Frank" Moran was elected as the 48th mayor of Camden. Prior to this, one of Moran's roles was as the director of Camden County Parks Department where he was in charge of overseeing several park projects expanding the Camden County Park System, including the Cooper River Park, as well as bringing back public ice skating rinks to the parks in Camden County.

The project plans to not only improve the infrastructure currently in place, but also to construct new buildings altogether, such as the new headquarters for American Water, which is a five-story, 222,376-square-foot office building. American Water's new headquarters on the Camden Waterfront was opened in December 2018. American Water was awarded $164.2 million in tax credits from the New Jersey's Grow New Jersey Assistance Program to build a five-story 220,000-square-foot building at Camden's waterfront. American Water opened this building in December 2018 becoming the first in a long line of new waterfront attractions planned to come to Camden.

Other construction projects in the Liberty Property Trust $1 billion project include a Hilton Garden Inn to be opened on the Camden Waterfront in 2020, which will contain 180 rooms, a restaurant, and space for conferences to be held. The Camden Tower, an 18-story, 394,164-square-foot office building which will be the headquarters for the New Jersey–based companies Conner Strong & Buckelew, NFI and The Michaels Organization, which is planned to finish construction in spring of 2019. Also included are apartments on 11 Cooper Street, which will be housing 156 units as well as a retail space on the ground level. The construction of these apartments is planned to be completed by the spring of 2019.

In October 2018, Liberty Property Trust announced that they would be leaving the billion dollar project behind, and selling it to anyone who is interested, as a "strategic shift." They still plan on finishing buildings in which construction has already made significant progress, such as the Camden Tower, and the Hilton Garden Inn; however, they do not wish to start any new building projects on office buildings. They have stated that they wish to focus more on industrial space projects, rather than those of office spaces. However, Liberty Property Trust is still looking to develop four parcels of land along the Delaware river that is able to hold 500,000 square feet (46,000 m^{2}) of land to be used for office space. One such company that has made plans to take advantage of this is Elwyn, a nonprofit that assists those living with disabilities based in Delaware. In February 2019 Elwyn received approval for assistance from New Jersey's Grow NJ economic development program that will help in covering the costs of the building. This office building would be built along the Delaware river, on one of the parcels owned previously owned by Liberty Property Trust, next to the currently under construction Camden Tower.

The NJ American Water Neighborhood Revitalization Tax Credit is a $985,000 grant which was introduced in July 2018. It is part of $4.8 million that New Jersey American Water has invested in Camden. Its purpose will be to allow current residents to remain in the city by providing them with $5,000 grants to make necessary home repairs. Some of the funding will also go towards Camden SMART (Stormwater Management and Resource Training). Funding will also go towards the Cramer Hill NOW Initiative, which focuses on improving infrastructure and parks.

On June 5, 2017, Cooper's Poynt Park was completed. The 5-acre park features multi-use trails, a playground, and new lighting. Visitors can see both the Delaware River and the Benjamin Franklin Bridge. Prior to 1985, the land the park resides on was open space that allowed Camden residents access to the waterfront. In 1985, the Riverfront State Prison was built, blocking that access. The land become available for the park to be built when the prison was demolished in 2009. Funding for the park was provided by Wells Fargo Regional Foundation, the William Penn Foundation, the State Department of Community Affairs, the Fund for New Jersey, and the Camden Economic Recovery Board.

Cooper's Ferry Partnership is a private non-profit founded in 1984. It was originally known as Cooper's Ferry Association until it merged with the Greater Camden Partnership in 2011, becoming Cooper's Ferry Partnership. Kris Kolluri is the current CEO. In a broad sense, their goal is to identify and advance economic development in Camden. While this does include housing rehabilitation, Cooper's Ferry is involved in multiple projects. This includes the Camden Greenway, which is a set of hiking and biking trails, and the Camden SMART (Stormwater Management and Resource Training) Initiative.

Revitalization efforts have persisted, bringing infrastructure such as the RiverLine.

In January 2019, Camden received a $1 million grant from Bloomberg Philanthropies for A New View, which is a public art project seeking to change illegal dump sites into public art fixtures. A New View is part of Bloomberg Philanthropies larger Public Art Challenge. Additionally, the program will educate residents of the harmful effects of illegal dumping. The effort will include the Cooper's Ferry Partnership, the Rutgers-Camden Center for the Arts, the Camden Collaborative Initiative, and the Camden City Cultural and Heritage Commission, as well as local businesses and residents. Locations to be targeted include dumping sites within proximity of Port Authority Transit Corporation high speed-line, the RiverLine, and the Camden GreenWay. According to Mayor Francisco Moran, illegal dumping costs Camden more than $4 million each year.

Furthermore, there were plans for a $2 billion expansion of Cooper University Hospital which further increases the current industry in Camden and indicates further developments in the city.

Recent developments also include the revitalization of public spaces, such as the construction of Camden's first comprehensive park plan and the redevelopment of housing complexes like Camden's Branch Village and Ablett Village. Additionally, investments have been made in education, with funding allocated for post-pandemic relief, facility renovations, and mental health support in Camden County.

In October 2025, the New Jersey Economic Development Authority (NJDEA) issued a Request for Expressions of Interest (RFEOI) to solicit development proposals of 16 acres along the North Camden waterfront on the site of the former prison, which had been demolished in 2009, as well as part of the Weeks Marine site; enacting on a redevelopment place in place since 2014.

=== Failed redevelopment projects ===
In early 2013, ShopRite announced that they would open the first full-service grocery store in Camden in 30 years, with plans to open their doors in 2015. In 2016 the company announced that they no longer planned to move to Camden leaving the plot of land on Admiral Willson Boulevard barren and the 20-acre section of the city as a food desert.

In May 2018, Chinese company Ofo brought its dockless bikes to Camden, along with many other cities, for a six-month pilot in an attempt to break into the American market. After two months in July 2018 Ofo decided to remove its bikes from Camden as part of a broader pullout from most of the American cities they had entered due to a decision that it was not profitable to be in these American cities.

On March 28, 2019, a former financial officer for Hewlett-Packard, Gulsen Kama, alleged that the company received a tax break based on false information. The company qualified for a $2.7 million tax break from the Grow NJ incentive of the Economic Development Authority (EDA). Kama testified that the company qualified for the tax break because of a false cost-benefit analysis she was ordered to prepare. She claims the analysis included a plan to move to Florida that was not in consideration by the company. The Grow NJ Incentive has granted $11 billion in tax breaks to preserve and create jobs in New Jersey, but it has experienced problems as well. A state comptroller sample audit ordered by Governor Phil Murphy showed that approximately 3,000 jobs companies listed with the EDA do not actually exist. Those jobs could be worth $11 million in tax credits. The audit also showed that the EDA did not collect sufficient data on companies that received tax credits.
