= Government of Camden, New Jersey =

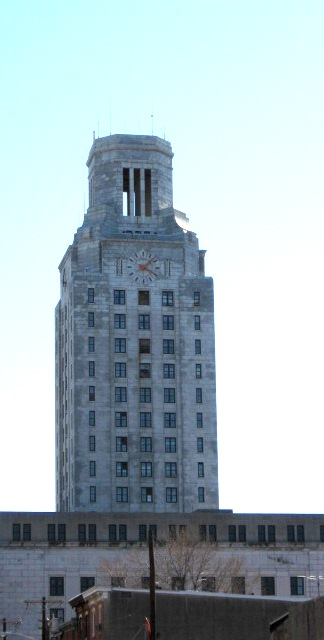
Camden's City Hall opened in 1931.

Since July 1, 1961, the city has operated within the Faulkner Act, formally known as the Optional Municipal Charter Law, under a Mayor-Council form of government. The city is one of 71 municipalities (of the 564) statewide that use this form of government. The governing body is comprised of the Mayor and the City Council, with all members elected in partisan voting to four-year terms of office on a staggered basis. The Mayor is directly elected by the voters. The City Council includes seven council members. Since 1994, the city has been divided into four council districts, with a single council member elected from each of the four districts and three council members being elected at-large; previously, the entire council was elected at-large. The four ward seats are up for election at the same time and the three at-large seats and the mayoral seat are up for election together two years later. For three decades before 1962 and from 1996 to 2007, Camden's municipal elections were held on a non-partisan basis; since 2007, the elections have been partisan.

As of 2024, the Mayor of Camden is Democrat Victor Carstarphen, whose term of office ends December 31, 2025. Members of the City Council are Council President Angel Fuentes (D, 2025; at large), Vice President Sheila Davis (D, 2025; at large), Arthur Barclay (D, 2027; Ward 1), Christopher R. Collins (D, 2027; Ward 2), Falio Leyba-Martinez (D, 2027; Ward 3), Jannette Ramos (D, 2027; Ward 4) and Noemi G. Soria-Perez (D, 2025; at large).

In May 2021, the city council appointed Victor Carstarphen to serve as mayor, filling the seat expiring in December 2021 that had been held by Frank Moran until he resigned from office the previous March.

In 2018, the city had an average residential property tax bill of $1,710, the lowest in the county, compared to an average bill of $6,644 in Camden County and $8,767 statewide.
