= Randy Primas =

American politician

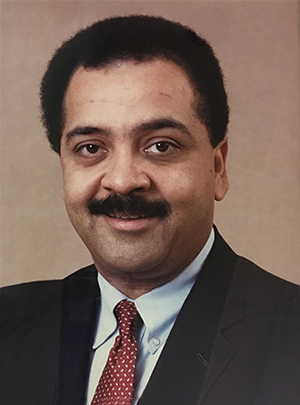

Commissioner of the New Jersey Department of Community Affairs
- In office January 18, 1990 – September 18, 1992
- Governor: James Florio
- Preceded by: Anthony M. Villane
- Succeeded by: Stephanie R. Bush

Mayor of Camden, New Jersey
- In office 1981–1990
- Preceded by: Angelo Errichetti
- Succeeded by: Aaron Thompson

Personal details
- Born: Melvin Randolph Primas, Jr. August 31, 1949 Camden, New Jersey
- Died: March 1, 2012 (aged 62) Chapel Hill, North Carolina
- Party: Democratic
- Spouse: Bonita Primas

Melvin Randolph "Randy" Primas, Jr. (August 31, 1949 – March 1, 2012) was an American politician who served as the first African-American Mayor of Camden, New Jersey from 1981 to 1990. He was succeeded by fellow African American Aaron A. Thompson.

== Biography ==
=== Early life ===
Primas was raised in Camden, New Jersey as a member of one of the city's most prominent families. He earned a bachelor's degree from Howard University in Washington, D.C., in 1971. Primas then joined the Black People's Unity Movement when he returned to Camden. Before becoming mayor, Primas was the Vice President of Burger King Entities, an economic-development program sponsored by the Black People's Unity Movement.

=== Political career ===
Primas was elected to the Camden City Council when he was just 23 years old, quickly rising to become the council's president. In the early 1980s, Camden Mayor Angelo Errichetti was indicted by U.S. federal authorities in the wake of the Abscam scandal and Primas subsequently won the 1981 mayoral election, becoming the first African-American mayor in the city's history. He was 31 years old at the time of his election.

Primas would be elected to three consecutive terms in the mayor's office, serving until 1990. However, his support for several urban renewal projects, including the construction of the now demolished Riverfront State Prison, earned him criticism from some community leaders and residents. Primas left office in 1990 when New Jersey Governor Jim Florio appointed to him as the Commissioner on the New Jersey Department of Community Affairs, succeeding Anthony M. Villane.

He served as a trustee for Rowan University from 1993 to 1999. Primas worked as an executive for Commerce Capital Markets, which was part of Commerce Bank at the time, during the early 2000.

In 2002, Primas was appointed the first chief operating officer (COO) of Camden by the state government, shortly before New Jersey took control of the city. He retired from the post in 2006 following a public dispute with Community Affairs Commissioner Susan Bass Levin over a memorandum of understanding which Primas had refused to sign.

Primas moved to Fort Mill, South Carolina, following his retirement. He was later diagnosed with bone-marrow cancer and died at a hospital in Chapel Hill, North Carolina, on March 1, 2012, at the age of 62. He was survived by his wife, Bonita, and two sons, Melvin Primas III and Craig Primas. Primas' funeral, which was held at the St. John Baptist Church in East Camden, was attended by numerous Camden and New Jersey political dignitaries, including Camden Mayor Dana Redd, former Mayor Gwendolyn Faison, U.S. Rep. Rob Andrews, Former Governor Jim Florio, state Senator Donald Norcross, and state Assemblyman Gilbert "Whip" Wilson. Camden Mayor Redd ordered all municipal flags to fly at half staff.

== See also ==
- List of first African-American mayors

Preceded by Angelo Errichetti	Mayor of Camden, New Jersey; 1981–1990	Succeeded by Aaron Thompson
Preceded by Anthony M. Villane	Commissioner of the New Jersey Department of Community Affairs; 1990–1992	Succeeded by Stephanie R. Bush
