= Mayors of Camden, New Jersey =

Mayor of Camden, New Jersey, has been an office since its inception in 1828.

== List of mayors ==
- Victor Carstarphen (2021–present)
- Curtis Jenkins (interim) (2021)
- Frank Moran (2018–2021)
- Dana Redd (2010–2018)
- Gwendolyn Faison (2000–2010)
- Milton Milan (1997–2000). Milton Milan was the third mayor of Camden to be indicted for corruption within the past 20 years.
- Arnold Webster (1993–1997). Arnold Webster was the second mayor of Camden to be indicted for corruption. He "pleaded guilty to federal wire fraud charges in 1998".
- Aaron Thompson (1990–1993)
- Melvin R. Primas, Jr. (1981–1990), first African-American mayor
- Angelo Errichetti (1973–1981). Angelo Errichetti was the first mayor of Camden to be indicted for corruption. He was indicted following Abscam.
- Joseph M. Nardi, Jr. (1969–1973)
- Alfred R. Pierce (1959–1969)
- George Edward Brunner (1936–1959)
- Frederick von Nieda (1935–1936). Frederick von Nieda is the last Republican Mayor of Camden to date.
- Roy R. Stewart (1931–1935)
- Winfield S. Price (1927–1931)
- Victor King (1923–1927)
- Frank S. Van Hart, acting (1922–1923)
- Charles H. Ellis (1905–1922)
- Joseph E. Nowrey (1902–1905)
- Cooper B. Hatch (1898–1902)
- L. Wescott (1892–1898)
- Jesse W. Pratt (1886–1892)
- Claudius W. Bradshaw (1880–1886)
- James W. Ayers (1877–1880)
- John Morgan (1876–1877)
- John H. Jones (1874–1876)
- Samuel M. Gaul (1871–1874)
- Charles Cox (1867–1871)
- Paul C. Budd (1864–1867)
- Timothy Middleton (1863–1864)
- Paul C. Budd (1862–1863)
- Thomas B. Atkinson (1860–1862)
- Clayton Trueax (1858–1860)
- Benjamin A. Hammel (1857–1858)
- James W. Shroff (1856–1857)
- Samuel Scull (1855–1856)
- Lorenzo F. Fisler (1853–1855)
- Charles D. Hineline (1852–1853)
- Lorenzo F. Fisler (1851–1852)
- Charles Sexton (1849–1851)
- Benjamin A. Hammell (1848–1849)
- Thomas B. Wood (1846–1848)
- Charles Kaighn (1845–1846)
- Richard W. Howell (1845–1846)
- John F. Cowperthwaite (1844–1845)
- Lorenzo F. Fisler (1840–1844)
- Elias Kaighn (1838–1840)
- Gideon V. Stivers (1830–1838)
- Samuel Laning (1828–1830). Samuel Laning was the first Mayor of Camden, New Jersey.
