= Angelo Errichetti =

American politician (1928–2013)

Member of the New Jersey Senate from the 5th district
- In office November 8, 1976 – August 14, 1981
- Preceded by: John J. Horn
- Succeeded by: Walter Rand

Mayor of Camden, New Jersey
- In office 1973–1981
- Preceded by: Joseph M. Nardi, Jr.
- Succeeded by: Randy Primas

Personal details
- Born: Angelo Joseph Errichetti; September 29, 1928 Camden, New Jersey, US
- Died: May 16, 2013 (aged 84) Ventnor City, New Jersey, US
- Party: Democratic

Angelo Joseph Errichetti (September 29, 1928 – May 16, 2013) was an American Democratic Party politician who served as Mayor of Camden, New Jersey, and in the New Jersey Senate before being indicted during Abscam.

== Early life ==
Angelo Joseph Errichetti grew up in poverty in Camden, the sixth of seven children of immigrants from Italy. His father, from Ruoti, Italy, worked stoking coal. The 5-foot, 9-inch Errichetti was a football standout at Camden High School and, after graduating went to West Nottingham Academy and briefly took night classes at Rutgers University. After working for a time in his brother's dry cleaning business and working in insurance, he enlisted in the United States Coast Guard.

== Career ==
Errichetti went into politics in 1961 as administrative assistant to Mayor Alfred R. Pierce and was named as Camden's purchasing agent and later as head of its Department of Public Works. He was first elected as Mayor in 1973 and was chosen in 1976 to fill a vacancy in the New Jersey Senate. In 1977 he was re-elected as mayor with 88% of the vote and won election to a full term in the State Senate.

As Mayor of Camden, Errichetti claimed to put in 12-hour days, working to improve the economy of the struggling city. He exercised substantial control over the city's operation, and he submitted seven budgets without tax increases that were passed with little oversight. The City Council first scheduled hearings for his budget submitted in 1980. Despite changes made by the Council, Errichetti was able to get his budget passed as is by a vote of 5–2.

=== Abscam conviction ===
Errichetti was charged with arranging for undercover agents to meet with several politicians who accepted bribes to help use their influence on behalf of individuals posing as Arab investors, with Errichetti taking his share of the bribes, in what was called the Abscam case. His grip on local politics started to fade, with his three-member slate for the Camden Board of Education all losing in elections, though he was able to get all of his Democratic City Committee candidates elected in June 1980. In May 1981, Errichetti was indicted on charges of bribery related to federally subsidized sewer projects, in which Errichetti was said to have received $10,000 in cash to steer engineering projects.

After his indictment, he emphatically denied the allegations filed against him and refused to consider demands that he resign from his two elected positions.

In 1981, Errichetti, defended by attorney Raymond A. Brown, was convicted of federal bribery and conspiracy charges, and sentenced to six years in prison, of which he served 32 months.

U.S. Senator Harrison A. Williams had claimed that he was improperly lured to accept bribes, to which Federal District Judge George C. Pratt responded that there was no evidence that the FBI sought out Senator Williams, rather he had selected himself when he accepted Errichetti's offer to meet with the undercover agents and that it was Errichetti who was "standing in the center of a cesspool of corruption".

== Death ==
A resident of Ventnor City, New Jersey, Errichetti died on May 16, 2013, at his home there. Camden mayor Dana Redd ordered that flags at Camden's municipal buildings be flown at half staff during the day that his funeral was held. He was predeceased by his wife Dolores and survived by his daughter, Michele.

== In popular culture ==
The character Carmine Polito (played by Jeremy Renner) in David O. Russell's 2013 film American Hustle is based on Errichetti.
