= Frank Moran (politician) =

American politician

48th Mayor of Camden, New Jersey
- In office January 1, 2018 – April 30, 2021
- Preceded by: Dana Redd
- Succeeded by: Curtis Jenkins (interim); Victor Carstarphen

Personal details
- Born: October 20, 1968 (age 57) Camden, New Jersey, U.S.
- Party: Democratic
- Spouse: Ivette Rivera
- Profession: Politician

Francisco Moran (born October 20, 1968) is an American Democratic politician and former mayor of Camden, New Jersey.

== Early life and career ==
Moran was born and raised in Camden and is a graduate of Woodrow Wilson High School. He is of Puerto Rican descent. His political career began in Camden when Milton Milan was elected mayor and Moran took his council member seat on the Third Ward by winning a special election. He won the seat by one hundred votes, defeating opponent Kirk Jones. In 1996, Moran described himself as grass roots and someone that the community can look up to and reach out to. During the council race, Moran was pressed on representing the black community in Camden. Moran responded with, "Like I tell people, I hear gunshots, you hear gunshots. Unless we come together, we're not going to stop the gunshots."

=== Mayor of Camden ===
Upon being elected mayor during a press conference Moran stated that, "I will be reaching out to the CEOs of these corporations...What are you really doing for Camden?" When asked about homelessness, Moran said that he had a "missionary heart" and that he was a Christian.

On March 5, 2021, Moran announced that he would be resigning as Mayor, effective April 30, 2021, before the expiration of his term. Camden City Council President Curtis Jenkins served as interim mayor until May 11, 2021 when councilmember Victor Carstarphen was appointed to fill Moran's unexpired term.

== Personal life ==
On August 19, 1989, Moran married Ivette Rivera. They have two children.
