= Gwendolyn Faison =

American politician (1925–2021)

Mayor of Camden
- In office December 22, 2000 – January 5, 2010
- Preceded by: Milton Milan
- Succeeded by: Dana Redd

Personal details
- Born: February 14, 1925 Clinton, North Carolina, U.S.
- Died: July 10, 2021 (aged 96) Camden, New Jersey, U.S.
- Party: Democratic

Gwendolyn A. Faison (February 14, 1925 – July 10, 2021) was an American Democratic politician. Faison held the office of Mayor of Camden, New Jersey from 2000 to 2010. She was the city's first female mayor, as well as the first African-American woman to serve as president of the Camden City Council.

Faison was first appointed when Milton Milan was convicted of corruption and forced to leave office in 2000. She had served as City Council President since 1997. Faison won re-election in 2001 and 2005. Under the State of New Jersey's recovery act for Camden, which expired in 2007, the Mayor's office had limited formal responsibilities for the first seven years of her tenure. She left office in January 2010 after electing not to seek a third term.

== Early life and career ==
Faison was born and raised in Clinton, North Carolina. Her father was a minister. She is the fifth of her parents' nine children.

She attended Shaw University, Temple University and Rutgers University. She was previously a member of the Camden County Board of Chosen Freeholders (filling a vacancy on the Board in 1985), Camden County Board on Aging, and Legislative Committee of the New Jersey Democratic Women. Professionally, Faison was a retired data processing administrator.

=== Camden City council ===
Faison was first elected to the Camden City Council in 1983. She lost re-election for her seat in the Second Ward to Councilman Ali Sloan El in 1995. However, Faison was returned to city council in the 1997 city election and became city council president. She was initially seen as an ally of Camden Mayor Milton Milan, and his policies. However, their relationship rapidly deteriorated when Milan was indicted for corruption in March 2000.

=== Mayor of Camden ===
Faison was sworn into office as Mayor of Camden on December 22, 2000, as Camden's first female mayor. Faison became acting mayor one day after the conviction of her predecessor, former Mayor Milton Milan, who was found guilty of 14 of 19 charges of political corruption on December 21, 2000.

She held office for the remainder of Milan's unexpired term, which ended in June 2001.

Faison won her first full term on May 8, 2001, becoming the city's first elected female mayor. She took office for a full term on July 1, 2001.

Faison won a second term in 2005, defeating New Jersey Assemblywoman Nilsa Cruz-Perez, in a mayoral runoff election held on June 14, 2005.

In November 2006, some Hispanic activists began a drive to recall Faison, arguing that the mayor had ignored the city's Latino neighborhoods and allowed racial discrimination in the city's fire department. She was a member of the Mayors Against Illegal Guns Coalition, a bi-partisan group with a stated goal of "making the public safer by getting illegal guns off the streets."

In February 2009, Faison decided that she would not seek election to a third, four-year term as mayor. She endorsed New Jersey state Sen. Dana Redd, who won the 2009 mayoral election to succeed her.

Faison died on July 10, 2021, in Camden, New Jersey, at age 96.

== See also ==
- List of first women mayors in the United States
