= Camden Forge Company =

American steel forging company

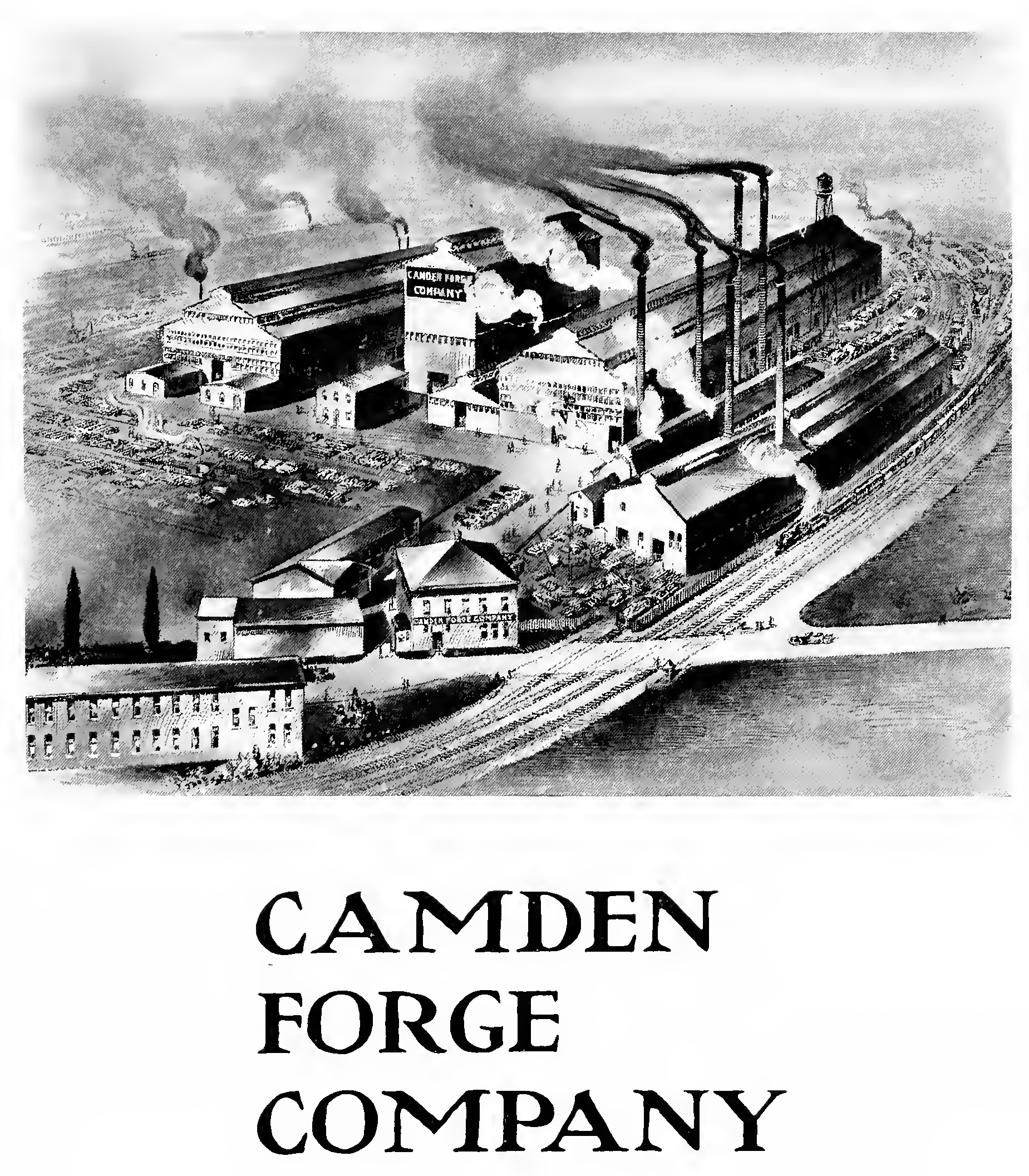
Drawing found inside the catalog, Camden Forgings, given to Cornell University's library

The Camden Forge Company (or Camden Forge for short) was an American steel forging company founded in 1901 and shut down during 1956, supplying custom forgings for anything from rods and bolts to steers and axles. The company's original address was the corner of Mount Ephraim Avenue and Bulson Avenue in Camden, New Jersey. After a few years the official address was changed to Mount Ephraim Avenue and the Atlantic City Railroad. During both World War I and World War II, they supplied materials for ships made by New York Shipbuilding Company. In July 1942, the company received the award for the Army and Navy "E" pennant for excellency in the production of war materials. The pennant received had 5 stars. Closing in 1956, the company went to public auction on April 10, 1956, at auction the company was worth $8,500,000. Camden Forge's Commercial and Government Entity code is 10399.

== History ==
Camden Forge was founded in 1901 by John Maenak, Samuel Howe, and Ward Kerlin. Howe remained president of the company into the late 1940s. Maenak worked as the vice president and general manager for just as long. Kerlin acted as the secretary-treasurer until the mid-1940s when he was replaced by H. A. Siegener.

The company started small with 12 employees. During 1917 and 1918 the company expanded their property, adding a new office, new forge presses, and all new machinery. Not long after the renovations the original shop was burned down in 1922, and needed to be replaced. When World War II began the Navy built additional buildings onto Camden Forge at a cost of $3,000,000 to facilitate the production of materials faster. One night in 1940 an oil hose leaked in one of the buildings at Camden Forge and set the interior walls on fire. Becoming a stock company in 1945 allowed the company to be distributed across 1,300 stockholders. Following the war, the Navy granted Camden Forge with the Army and Navy "E" pennant with 5 stars, because they felt the company had gone above and beyond their production expectations.

As deindustrialization swept across America, the company went into decline during the 1950s. In 1954 Lowell Birrell gained control of the company and later on in 1955 he stopped all production. The company officially closed their doors in 1956. Seven years after the closing, the vacant building was set on fire, arson was suspected.

== Employment ==
Employment
Year	1901	1907	1914	1929	1936	1937	1941	1946	1951
Employees	12	60–70	50–90	100	300	235	800	1,110	600

During 1901, the company consisted of 12 employees who all together made $25,000 that year. In 1907 the employment increased to the range of 60 to 70 employees. A strike arose this year because a hammer operator was accused of breaking one of the machines he operated. When the man denied the companies claim and left, another one of the operators left the company as well. Forty more men chose to begin a strike against the company resulting in their jobs replaced.

Seven years later in 1914, the company provided jobs to 50 people during the slow months of the year as opposed to the 80 to 90 employees in their busier months. Despite the company's growth in 1917 and 1918, when the great depression began in 1929, the company was only able to supply jobs to about 100 workers. Recovering from the great depression, the company tripled their employment to almost 300 employees by 1936. Not much expansion followed in 1937 with a recorded employee count of 235 workers. By 1941, Camden Forge Co. employed 800 workers and projected to hire another 125 by 1942. Their projection was seen true, the company continued their increase of employees all the way to 1,110 in 1946. 1951 being one of the later years of the company had a work force the size of 600 men. Although the number of workers was not at its peak, the salary total of all the workers was estimated at $2.33 million.

== Legal issues ==
In 1958, following the closing of Camden Forge Company, Herman De Pova fought Camden Forge in court over an alleged breach of an employment contract. Pova was contracted to report on why the company was losing money in 1954 by director and chairman of the executive committee, Lowell Birrell. This deal was made on the basis of Pova making $20,000 for the calendar year. Following in 1955 Pova was offered a substantial pay increase from Erie Forge and Steel Company. Upon receiving this offer Pova conducted a meeting with Birrell to discuss, and during this meeting Birrell offered Pova a salary raise to $35,000 and ten percent of the company's profit for the year 1955. However, in this year Birrell resigned from the company leaving Herman De Pova without his salary he was promised. Because of Pova's lack of compensation he took Camden Forge to court to try and recover his loss.

== Important people ==
=== President ===
- Samuel Purdy Howe – 1901–1947

=== Vice president ===
- John Maenak – 1901–1940s
- Walter S. Cox – Known year 1947
- John T. Nicholson Jr. – Known year 1953

=== Secretary and Treasurer ===
- Ward D. Kerlin – 1901–1942
  - In 1942, Kerlin finished his first term as the Class B director of Federal Reserve Bank of Philadelphia, and was re-elected.
- H. A. Siegener – Known year 1947

=== Assistant Secretary and Treasurer ===
- R. C. Stewart – Known year 1947

=== General Manager ===
- John Maenak – 1901–1940s
- D. Adam – Known year 1947

=== Director and Chairman of Executive Committee ===
- Lowell Birrell
  - Took control of Camden Forge Company in 1954

== Products ==
Camden Forge accepted requests for any forged or machined product, available in iron or steel:

- High and Low Carbon Bars
- Press Columns and Rams
- Pull Back Cylinders
- Water Cylinders
- Valve Bodies
- Plungers
- Weldless Steel Rings
- Lathe Spindles, solid and hollow bored
- Long Feed Screws
- Power Press Crank Shafts
- Cam Shafts
- Eccentric Shafts
- Crusher Shafts
- Gear and Pinion Blanks
- Locomotive
  - Side and Main Rods
  - Crank Pins
  - Axles
  - Rod Straps
  - Guides
  - Parts of frame both in iron and steel
- Hammered Iron Bars for locomotive repairs
- Marine Shaft
- Marine Connecting and Eccentric Rods
- Rolls
  - Bending
  - Feed
  - Straightening
  - Embossing
- Large Wrenches
- Saw Arbors
- Steam Engine Forgings
- Pump Crank Shafts
- Pump Connecting Rods
- Large Nuts
- Turbine Shafts
- Mill Shafting
- Trolley Car Axles
- Electric Motor Axles
