= Milton Milan =

American politician (born 1962)

Milton I. Milan

Mayor of Camden, New Jersey
- In office July 1, 1997 – December 21, 2000
- Preceded by: Arnold W. Webster
- Succeeded by: Gwendolyn Faison

Personal details
- Born: November 10, 1962 (age 63)
- Party: Democratic

Milton Milan (born November 10, 1962) is an American Democratic politician. He was the first Latino mayor of Camden, New Jersey, elected in 1997, before being convicted of corruption and subsequently removed from office, becoming the third Camden mayor in 20 years to be found guilty of corruption.

== Biography ==
Milan grew up in North Camden and served as a United States Marine in the 1980s. He was elected to City Council in 1995. During his first term as mayor, he was indicted on a 19-count corruption case, and convicted on 14 of those counts on December 21, 2000, among them:

- laundered $65,000 in drug money
- staged a break-in with his former business partner to collect insurance money illegally
- accepted $30,000 to $50,000 in bribes from the Mafia
- used campaign money to pay for a vacation to Puerto Rico
- received two vehicles and thousands of dollars in free work on his home from city contractors
- and authorized the shakedown of a $5,000 political contribution from the city's public defender

The judge sentenced him to the maximum allowed under federal sentencing guidelines: seven years and three months in prison minus time served, and three years of supervision, plus barment from running for office. He spared Milan a fine, citing the lack of ability to pay, but Milan was held responsible for $14,761 in restitution.
