= Dana Redd =

American politician (born 1968)

Mayor of Camden
- In office January 5, 2010 – January 1, 2018
- Preceded by: Gwendolyn Faison
- Succeeded by: Frank Moran

Member of the New Jersey Senate from the 5th district
- In office January 8, 2008 – January 5, 2010
- Preceded by: Wayne R. Bryant
- Succeeded by: Donald Norcross

Personal details
- Born: March 7, 1968 (age 58) Camden, New Jersey
- Party: Democratic
- Education: Rutgers University, Camden (BS); Rutgers University, New Brunswick; Lincoln University, Pennsylvania (MA)
- Alma mater: Bishop Eustace Preparatory School

Dana L. Redd (born March 7, 1968) is an American Democratic politician who was the Mayor of Camden, from 2010 to 2018. Redd was in the New Jersey Senate from January 8, 2008, to January 5, 2010, representing the 5th Legislative District.

== Education ==
Redd graduated from Bishop Eustace Preparatory School in 1986 and began full-time employment while attending college at night. She received a B.S. degree in Business from Rutgers University-Camden and attended the Edward J. Bloustein School of Planning and Public Policy (Principles of Redevelopment). She went on to earn a Master of Arts degree in Human Services Administration (MHSA) from Lincoln University (Pennsylvania).

== Elected office ==
Redd served on the Senate's Community and Urban Affairs Committee (as vice-chair), the Budget and Appropriations Committee and the Health, Human Services and Senior Citizens Committee. She also served on the Joint Committee on Public Schools.

Redd has served on the New Jersey Democratic State Committee as its vice chair since 2006 and on the Democratic National Committee from 2006, and was a delegate to the 2004 Democratic National Convention. She has served on the New Jersey Redistricting Commission since 2001. Redd has served on the Camden City Council as Vice Chair since 2001 and on its Housing Authority, as Chair, from 2004 to 2006.

She simultaneously held a seat in the New Jersey Senate and on the City Council. This dual position, often called double dipping, is allowed under a grandfather clause in the state law enacted by the New Jersey Legislature and signed into law by Governor of New Jersey Jon Corzine in September 2007 that prevents dual-office-holding but allows those who had held both positions as of February 1, 2008, to retain both posts. She was elected mayor of Camden in 2009.

She won the Democratic primary in June 2009 with 86% of the vote, and was the general favorite in the November election. She won the general election on November 3, 2009, and was re-elected in 2013 for another four-year term.

== Post-mayoralty ==
After leaving the mayor's office, Redd was CEO of the Rowan University Rutgers-Camden Board of Governors before stepping down in 2022 to become CEO of the Camden Community Partnership.

In June 2024, Redd was indicted by New Jersey Attorney General Matthew Platkin along with George Norcross and others on racketeering charges. During her tenure as mayor of Camden, Redd is alleged to have used her office to help Norcross and the other defendants improperly obtain property rights along the Camden Waterfront. The charges were dismissed in February 2025, and the case officially closed in 2026.

Party political offices
Preceded by Joseph Cryan	Vice Chair of the New Jersey Democratic Party; 2006–2013	Succeeded by Lizette Delgado-Polanco
New Jersey Senate
Preceded by Wayne Bryant	Member of the New Jersey Senate from the 5th district 2008–2010	Succeeded by Donald Norcross
Political offices
Preceded by Gwendolyn Faison	Mayor of Camden; 2010–2018	Succeeded by Frank Moran
