= 2027 New Jersey General Assembly election =

- November 2, 2027

All 80 seats in the New Jersey General Assembly 41 seats needed for a majority
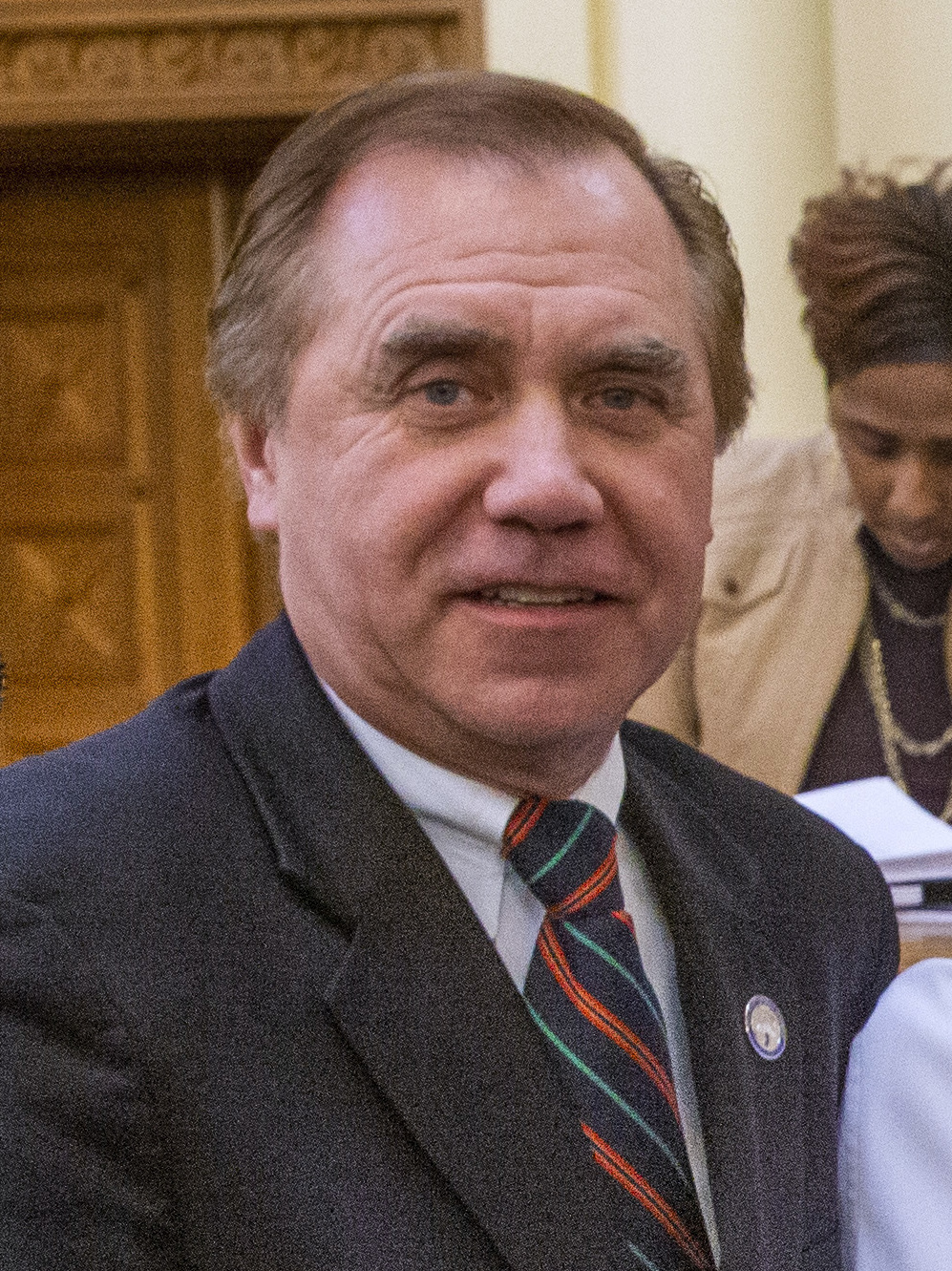

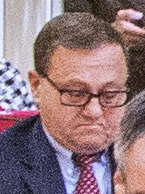
Leader	Craig Coughlin	John DiMaio
Party	Democratic	Republican
Leader since	January 9, 2018	January 11, 2022
Leader's seat	19th (Woodbridge)	23rd (Hackettstown)
Last election	57	23
Seats needed	Steady	▲18
- Status of the incumbents: Democratic incumbent Retiring Democrat; Republican incumbent Retiring Republican
Incumbent Speaker
Craig Coughlin
Democratic

The 2027 New Jersey General Assembly election will be held on November 2, 2027. New Jersey voters will elect two Assembly members in all of the state's legislative districts for a two-year term to the New Jersey General Assembly. Democrats have held a majority in the chamber since 2002, and further expanded their majority in 2025 by 5 seats.

== Incumbents not running for re-election ==
=== Democratic ===
1. District 4: Dan Hutchison is retiring.
2. District 28: Cleopatra Tucker is retiring.
3. District 31: Jerry Walker is retiring to run for state senate.
4. District 32: Ravinder Bhalla is retiring.

=== Republican ===
1. District 26: Jay Webber is retiring to run for state senate.

== Summary of results by district ==
=== By state legislative district ===
Legislative district	2024 Pres.	Incumbent	Party	Elected Assembly member	Outcome
District 1	R +10.7	Antwan McClellan	Rep	TBD	
District 1	R +10.7	Erik Simonsen	Rep	TBD	
District 2	D +1.6	Don Guardian	Rep	TBD	
District 2	D +1.6	Maureen Rowan	Dem	TBD	
District 3	R +7.4	Dave Bailey Jr.	Dem	TBD	
District 3	R +7.4	Heather Simmons	Dem	TBD	
District 4	D +1.6	Dan Hutchison	Dem	TBD	
District 4	D +1.6	Cody Miller	Dem	TBD	
District 5	D +29.3	William Spearman	Dem	TBD	
District 5	D +29.3	Bill Moen	Dem	TBD	
District 6	D +27.4	Louis Greenwald	Dem	TBD	
District 6	D +27.4	Melinda Kane	Dem	TBD	
District 7	D +28.9	Carol A. Murphy	Dem	TBD	
District 7	D +28.9	Balvir Singh	Dem	TBD	
District 8	D +1.1	Anthony Angelozzi	Dem	TBD	
District 8	D +1.1	Andrea Katz	Dem	TBD	
District 9	R +29.4	Brian E. Rumpf	Rep	TBD	
District 9	R +29.4	Greg Myhre	Rep	TBD	
District 10	R +27.8	Gregory P. McGuckin	Rep	TBD	
District 10	R +27.8	Paul Kanitra	Rep	TBD	
District 11	D +4.3	Margie Donlon	Dem	TBD	
District 11	D +4.3	Luanne Peterpaul	Dem	TBD	
District 12	R +25.0	Robert D. Clifton	Rep	TBD	
District 12	R +25.0	Alex Sauickie	Rep	TBD	
District 13	R +15.2	Gerard Scharfenberger	Rep	TBD	
District 13	R +15.2	Vicky Flynn	Rep	TBD	
District 14	D +11.1	Wayne DeAngelo	Dem	TBD	
District 14	D +11.1	Tennille McCoy	Dem	TBD	
District 15	D +41.9	Verlina Reynolds-Jackson	Dem	TBD	
District 15	D +41.9	Anthony Verrelli	Dem	TBD	
District 16	D +14.1	Roy Freiman	Dem	TBD	
District 16	D +14.1	Mitchelle Drulis	Dem	TBD	
District 17	D +32.0	Joseph Danielsen	Dem	TBD	
District 17	D +32.0	Kevin Egan	Dem	TBD	
District 18	D +10.1	Robert Karabinchak	Dem	TBD	
District 18	D +10.1	Sterley Stanley	Dem	TBD	
District 19	D +0.7	Craig Coughlin	Dem	TBD	
District 19	D +0.7	Yvonne Lopez	Dem	TBD	
District 20	D +24.2	Annette Quijano	Dem	TBD	
District 20	D +24.2	Ed Rodriguez	Dem	TBD	
District 21	D +12.2	Andrew Macurdy	Dem	TBD	
District 21	D +12.2	Vincent Kearney	Dem	TBD	
District 22	D +24.8	James J. Kennedy	Dem	TBD	
District 22	D +24.8	Linda S. Carter	Dem	TBD	
District 23	R +10.1	Erik Peterson	Rep	TBD	
District 23	R +10.1	John DiMaio	Rep	TBD	
District 24	R +19.4	Dawn Fantasia	Rep	TBD	
District 24	R +19.4	Mike Inganamort	Rep	TBD	
District 25	R +0.5	Aura Dunn	Rep	TBD	
District 25	R +0.5	Marisa Sweeney	Dem	TBD	
District 26	R +8.8	Jay Webber	Rep	TBD	
District 26	R +8.8	Brian Bergen	Rep	TBD	
District 27	D +31.1	Rosy Bagolie	Dem	TBD	
District 27	D +31.1	Alixon Collazos-Gill	Dem	TBD	
District 28	D +76.7	Cleopatra Tucker	Dem	TBD	
District 28	D +76.7	Chigozie Onyema	Dem	TBD	
District 29	D +41.2	Eliana Pintor Marin	Dem	TBD	
District 29	D +41.2	Shanique Speight	Dem	TBD	
District 30	R +46.3	Sean T. Kean	Rep	TBD	
District 30	R +46.3	Avi Schnall	Dem	TBD	
District 31	D +27.5	William Sampson	Dem	TBD	
District 31	D +27.5	Jerry Walker	Dem	TBD	
District 32	D +43.2	Katie Brennan	Dem	TBD	
District 32	D +43.2	Ravinder Bhalla	Dem	TBD	
District 33	D +13.0	Larry Wainstein	Dem	TBD	
District 33	D +13.0	Gabe Rodriguez	Dem	TBD	
District 34	D +40.4	Carmen Morales	Dem	TBD	
District 34	D +40.4	Michael Venezia	Dem	TBD	
District 35	D +12.0	Kenyatta Stewart	Dem	TBD	
District 35	D +12.0	Al Abdelaziz	Dem	TBD	
District 36	R +4.6	Gary Schaer	Dem	TBD	
District 36	R +4.6	Clinton Calabrese	Dem	TBD	
District 37	D +23.0	Shama Haider	Dem	TBD	
District 37	D +23.0	Ellen Park	Dem	TBD	
District 38	R +0.1	Lisa Swain	Dem	TBD	
District 38	R +0.1	Chris Tully	Dem	TBD	
District 39	R +2.2	Robert Auth	Rep	TBD	
District 39	R +2.2	John Azzariti	Rep	TBD	
District 40	R +7.3	Christopher DePhillips	Rep	TBD	
District 40	R +7.3	Al Barlas	Rep	TBD	

== District 1 ==
=== Republican primary ===
==== Declared ====
- Antwan McClellan, incumbent assemblymember
- Erik Simonsen, incumbent assemblymember

== District 2 ==
=== Republican primary ===
==== Declared ====
- Don Guardian, incumbent assemblymember

==== Filed paperwork ====
- Claire Swift, former assemblymember (2022–2026)

=== Democratic primary ===
==== Filed paperwork ====
- Stevenson Malloy, Historic Commission member
- Maureen Rowan, incumbent assemblymember

== District 3 ==
=== Democratic primary ===
==== Declared ====
- Dave Bailey Jr., incumbent assemblymember
- Heather Simmons, incumbent assemblymember

== District 4 ==
=== Democratic primary ===
==== Declared ====
- Cody Miller, incumbent assemblymember

==== Declined ====
- Dan Hutchison, incumbent assemblymember

== District 5 ==
=== Democratic primary ===
==== Filed paperwork ====
- Bill Moen, incumbent assemblymember
- William Spearman, incumbent assemblymember

== District 6 ==
=== Democratic primary ===
==== Filed paperwork ====
- Louis Greenwald, incumbent assemblymember
- Melinda Kane, incumbent assemblymember

== District 7 ==
=== Democratic primary ===
==== Filed paperwork ====
- Carol Murphy, incumbent assemblymember
- Balvir Singh, incumbent assemblymember

== District 8 ==
=== Democratic primary ===
==== Filed paperwork ====
- Anthony Angelozzi, incumbent assemblymember
- Andrea Katz, incumbent assemblymember

== District 9 ==
=== Republican primary ===
==== Declared ====
- Greg Myhre, incumbent assemblymember
- Brian E. Rumpf, incumbent assemblymember

== District 10 ==
=== Republican primary ===
==== Filed paperwork ====
- Paul Kanitra, incumbent assemblymember
- Gregory P. McGuckin, incumbent assemblymember

== District 11 ==
=== Democratic primary ===
==== Filed paperwork ====
- Margie Donlon, incumbent assemblymember
- Luanne Peterpaul, incumbent assemblymember

== District 12 ==
=== Republican primary ===
==== Filed paperwork ====
- Robert Clifton, incumbent assemblymember
- Alex Sauickie, incumbent assemblymember

== District 13 ==
=== Republican primary ===
==== Potential ====
- Vicky Flynn, incumbent assemblymember
- Gerard Scharfenberger, incumbent assemblymember

=== Democratic primary ===
==== Filed paperwork ====
- Jason M. Corley, athletic administrator for Long Branch Public Schools

== District 14 ==
=== Democratic primary ===
==== Filed paperwork ====
- Wayne DeAngelo, incumbent assemblymember
- Tennille McCoy, incumbent assemblymember

== District 15 ==
=== Democratic primary ===
==== Filed paperwork ====
- Verlina Reynolds-Jackson, incumbent assemblymember
- Anthony Verrelli, incumbent assemblymember

== District 16 ==
=== Democratic primary ===
==== Filed paperwork ====
- Mitchelle Drulis, incumbent assemblymember
- Roy Freiman, incumbent assemblymember

=== Republican primary ===
==== Filed paperwork ====
- Catherine Payne, Mayor of Hillsborough Township

== District 17 ==
=== Democratic primary ===
==== Declared ====
- Joseph Danielsen, incumbent assemblymember
- Kevin Egan, incumbent assemblymember

==== Potential ====
- Loretta Rivers, Piscataway Township Schools board member and candidate for this district in 2025

== District 18 ==
=== Democratic primary ===
==== Filed paperwork ====
- Robert Karabinchak, incumbent assemblymember
- Sterley Stanley, incumbent assemblymember

== District 19 ==
=== Democratic primary ===
==== Potential ====
- Craig Coughlin, incumbent assemblymember
- Yvonne Lopez, incumbent assemblymember

== District 20 ==
=== Democratic primary ===
==== Potential ====
- Sergio Granados, Union County commissioner and candidate for this district in 2025
- Annette Quijano, incumbent assemblymember
- Ed Rodriguez, incumbent assemblymember

== District 21 ==
=== Democratic primary ===
==== Potential ====
- Vincent Kearney, incumbent assemblymember
- Andrew Macurdy, incumbent assemblymember

=== Republican primary ===
==== Declared ====
- Daniel Croson, Warren Township committeeman

==== Potential ====
- Jason Cilento, mayor of Dunellen
- Michele Matsikoudis, former assemblymember (2022–2026)

== District 22 ==
=== Democratic primary ===
==== Potential ====
- Linda Carter, incumbent assemblymember
- James Kennedy, incumbent assemblymember

== District 23 ==
=== Republican primary ===
==== Potential ====
- John DiMaio, incumbent assemblymember
- Erik Peterson, incumbent assemblymember

== District 24 ==
=== Republican primary ===
==== Declared ====
- Dawn Fantasia, incumbent assemblymember
- Mike Inganamort, incumbent assemblymember

==== Endorsements ====
Dawn Fantasia

State legislators

- John DiMaio, minority leader of the New Jersey General Assembly (2022–present) from the 23rd district (2009–present) (co-endorsement with Inganamort)
- Parker Space, state senator from the 24th district (2024–present) (co-endorsement with Inganamort)
Mike Inganamort

State legislators

- John DiMaio, minority leader of the New Jersey General Assembly (2022–present) from the 23rd district (2009–present) (co-endorsement with Fantasia)
- Parker Space, state senator from the 24th district (2024–present) (co-endorsement with Fantasia)

=== Democratic primary ===
==== Filed paperwork ====
- Quashinna Williams, Hopatcong insurance agent and U.S. Army veteran

== District 25 ==
=== Republican primary ===
==== Declared ====
- Anthony Somma, Morris County Housing Authority commissioner

==== Filed paperwork ====
- Aura Dunn, incumbent assemblymember

==== Potential ====
- Joe Hathaway, Randolph councilmember and nominee for New Jersey's 11th congressional district in the 2026 special and regular elections

==== Declined ====
- Christian Barranco, former assemblymember (2022–2026) (endorsed Somma)

=== Democratic primary ===
==== Declared ====
- Daniella Mendez, Dover councilmember

==== Potential ====
- Marisa Sweeney, incumbent assemblymember

== District 26 ==
=== Republican primary ===
==== Declared ====
- Brian Bergen, incumbent assemblymember
- Tom Mastrangelo, Morris County commissioner, candidate for this district in 2021, and candidate for New Jersey's 26th senate district in 2023
- Stephen Shaw, Morris County commissioner

==== Publicly expressed interest ====
- Luke Ferrante, executive director of the New Jersey Republican Party

==== Potential ====
- James Barberio, former mayor of Parsippany
- Paul Carifi, Jr., Parsippany councilmember
- BettyLou DeCroce, former state assemblymember (2012–2022) and candidate for this district in 2023
- Ace Gallagher, mayor of Hanover
- Carolyn Jandoli, East Hanover Township councilmember
- Matt Kayne, mayor of Montville
- David Kohle, Pequannock Township councilmember
- Audrey Lane, former Mountain Lakes councilmember
- Justin Musella, Jr., former Parsippany councilmember
- Robert Peluso, former Parsippany councilmember and candidate for this district in 2023
- Deborah Smith, Morris County commissioner
- Mark Taylor, mayor of Florham Park
- Ekamon Venin, Pompton Lakes councilmember

==== Declined ====
- Jay Webber, incumbent assemblymember (running for state senate)

==== Endorsements ====
Tom Mastrangelo

Local officials

- 6 mayors

=== Democratic primary ===
==== Publicly expressed interest ====
- Ahmad Saleh, registered nurse

==== Potential ====
- Lauren Barnett, Mountain Lakes councilmember and candidate for the 25th district in 2021
- Shari Seffer, Montville Democratic municipal chair
- Michael Soriano, former mayor of Parsippany

== District 27 ==
=== Democratic primary ===
==== Filed paperwork ====
- Rosy Bagolie, incumbent assemblymember
- Alixon Collazos-Gill, incumbent assemblymember

== District 28 ==
=== Democratic primary ===
==== Potential ====
- Chigozie Onyema, incumbent assemblymember
- Alturrick Kenney, Essex County surrogate
- Hasani Council, Newark school board member

==== Declined ====
- Cleopatra Tucker, incumbent assemblymember

== District 29 ==
=== Democratic primary ===
==== Filed paperwork ====
- Eliana Pintor Marin, incumbent assemblymember
- Shanique Speight, incumbent assemblymember

== District 30 ==
=== Republican primary ===
==== Potential ====
- Sean Kean, incumbent assemblymember

=== Democratic primary ===
==== Potential ====
- Avi Schnall, incumbent assemblymember

== District 31 ==
=== Democratic primary ===
==== Potential ====
- William Sampson, incumbent assemblymember

==== Declined ====
- Jerry Walker, incumbent assemblymember (running for state senate)

== District 32 ==
=== Democratic primary ===
==== Declared ====
- Katie Brennan, incumbent assemblymember
- Joe Quintero, Hoboken councilmember

==== Potential ====
- Vanessa Falco, former Hoboken councilmember

==== Declined ====
- Ravinder Bhalla, incumbent assemblymember

==== Endorsements ====
Katie Brennan

State legislators

- Raj Mukherji, state senator from the 32nd district (2024–present) (co-endorsement with Quintero)

Local officials

- Emily Jabbour, mayor of Hoboken (2026–present) (co-endorsement with Quintero)
- James Solomon, mayor of Jersey City (2026–present) (co-endorsement with Quintero)

Political parties

- Hudson County Democratic Organization (co-endorsement with Quintero)
Joe Quintero

State legislators

- Raj Mukherji, state senator from the 32nd district (2024–present) (co-endorsement with Brennan)

Local officials

- Emily Jabbour, mayor of Hoboken (2026–present) (co-endorsement with Brennan)
- James Solomon, mayor of Jersey City (2026–present) (co-endorsement with Brennan)

Political parties

- Hudson County Democratic Organization (co-endorsement with Brennan)

== District 33 ==
=== Democratic primary ===
==== Potential ====
- Gabe Rodriguez, incumbent assemblymember
- Larry Wainstein, incumbent assemblymember

== District 34 ==
=== Democratic primary ===
==== Potential ====
- Kasey Dudley, president of the Bloomfield board of education
- Carmen Morales, incumbent assemblymember
- Michael Venezia, incumbent assemblymember
- Dwayne Warren, mayor of Orange
- Adrienne Wooten, Orange councilmember

== District 35 ==
=== Democratic primary ===
==== Potential ====
- Al Abdelaziz, incumbent assemblymember
- Kenyatta Stewart, incumbent assemblymember

== District 36 ==
=== Democratic primary ===
==== Potential ====
- Clinton Calabrese, incumbent assemblymember
- Gary Schaer, incumbent assemblymember

== District 37 ==
=== Democratic primary ===
==== Potential ====
- Shama Haider, incumbent assemblymember
- Ellen Park, incumbent assemblymember

== District 38 ==
=== Democratic primary ===
==== Potential ====
- Lisa Swain, incumbent assemblymember
- Chris Tully, incumbent assemblymember

== District 39 ==
=== Republican primary ===
==== Potential ====
- Robert Auth, incumbent assemblymember
- John Azzariti, incumbent assemblymember

== District 40 ==
=== Republican primary ===
==== Filed paperwork ====
- Al Barlas, incumbent assemblymember
- Christopher DePhillips, incumbent assemblymember

== See also ==
- 2027 New Jersey elections
- 2027 New Jersey Senate election
- List of New Jersey state legislatures
