= 2027 New Jersey Senate election =

2027 New Jersey State Senate election
- November 2, 2027

All 40 seats in the New Jersey Senate 21 seats needed for a majority

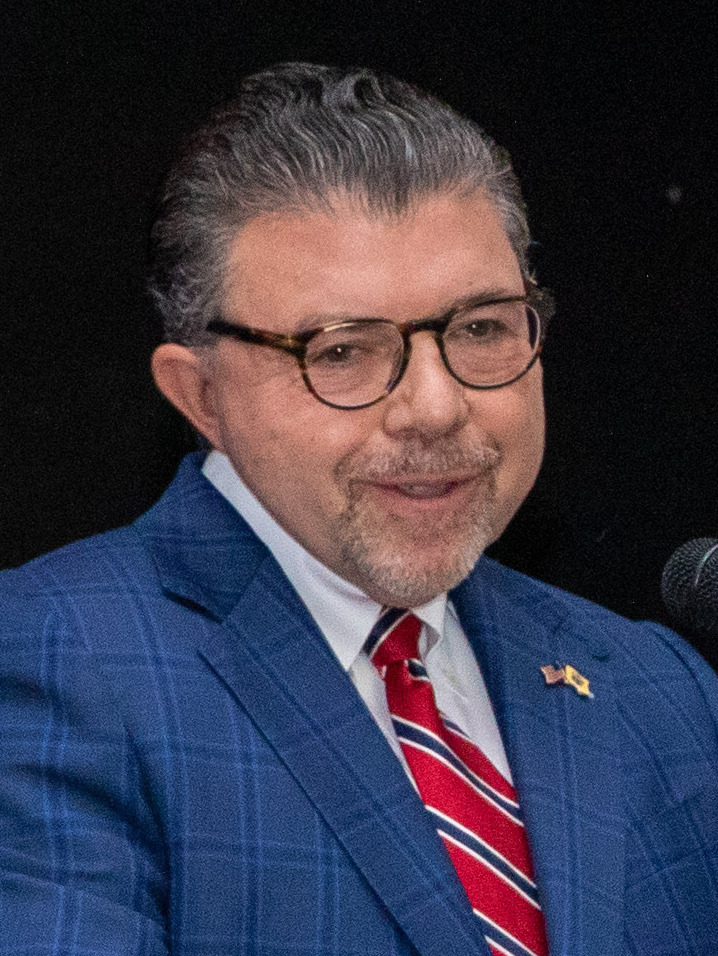
Leader	Nicholas Scutari	Anthony M. Bucco
Party	Democratic	Republican
Leader since	January 11, 2022	July 1, 2023
Leader's seat	22nd (Linden)	25th (Boonton Twp.)
Current seats	25	15
Seats needed	Steady	▲6
- Status of the incumbents: Democratic incumbent Republican incumbent Retiring Republican
Incumbent Senate President
Nicholas Scutari
Democratic

The 2027 New Jersey State Senate elections will be held on November 2, 2027. New Jersey voters will elect state senators in all of the state's legislative districts for a four-year term to the New Jersey Senate. Prior to the election, 25 seats are held by Democrats and 15 seats are held by Republicans.

== Incumbents not running for re-election ==
=== Republican ===
1. District 26: Joseph Pennacchio is retiring.

== Summary of results by district ==
Legislative district	2024 Pres.	Incumbent	Party	Elected senator	Outcome
District 1	R +10.7	Mike Testa	Rep	TBD	
District 2	D +1.6	Vince Polistina	Rep	TBD	
District 3	R +7.4	John Burzichelli	Dem	TBD	
District 4	D +1.6	Paul Moriarty	Dem	TBD	
District 5	D +29.3	Nilsa Cruz-Perez	Dem	TBD	
District 6	D +27.4	James Beach	Dem	TBD	
District 7	D +28.9	Troy Singleton	Dem	TBD	
District 8	D +1.1	Latham Tiver	Rep	TBD	
District 9	R +29.4	Carmen Amato	Rep	TBD	
District 10	R +27.8	James Holzapfel	Rep	TBD	
District 11	D +4.3	Vin Gopal	Dem	TBD	
District 12	R +25.0	Owen Henry	Rep	TBD	
District 13	R +15.2	Declan O'Scanlon	Rep	TBD	
District 14	D +11.1	Linda Greenstein	Dem	TBD	
District 15	D +41.9	Shirley Turner	Dem	TBD	
District 16	D +14.1	Andrew Zwicker	Dem	TBD	
District 17	D +32.0	Bob Smith	Dem	TBD	
District 18	D +10.1	Patrick Diegnan	Dem	TBD	
District 19	D +0.7	Joe Vitale	Dem	TBD	
District 20	D +24.2	Joseph Cryan	Dem	TBD	
District 21	D +12.2	Jon Bramnick	Rep	TBD	
District 22	D +24.8	Nicholas Scutari	Dem	TBD	
District 23	R +10.1	Doug Steinhardt	Rep	TBD	
District 24	R +19.4	Parker Space	Rep	TBD	
District 25	R +0.5	Anthony M. Bucco	Rep	TBD	
District 26	R +8.8	Joseph Pennacchio	Rep	TBD	
District 27	D +31.1	John McKeon	Dem	TBD	
District 28	D +76.7	Renee Burgess	Dem	TBD	
District 29	D +41.2	Teresa Ruiz	Dem	TBD	
District 30	R +46.3	Robert Singer	Rep	TBD	
District 31	D +27.5	Angela McKnight	Dem	TBD	
District 32	D +43.2	Raj Mukherji	Dem	TBD	
District 33	D +13.0	Brian Stack	Dem	TBD	
District 34	D +40.4	Britnee Timberlake	Dem	TBD	
District 35	D +12.0	Benjie Wimberly	Dem	TBD	
District 36	R +4.6	Paul Sarlo	Dem	TBD	
District 37	D +23.0	Gordon Johnson	Dem	TBD	
District 38	R +0.1	Joseph Lagana	Dem	TBD	
District 39	R +2.2	Holly Schepisi	Rep	TBD	
District 40	R +7.3	Kristin Corrado	Rep	TBD	

== Special elections ==
=== District 35 ===
Incumbent Senator Nellie Pou, first elected in 2011, was elected to the U.S. House of Representatives. Under the state constitution, vacancies must be filled within 35 days by the members of the county committee of the political party that the outgoing member was a part of. On January 16, 2025, Speaker pro tempore of the New Jersey General Assembly Benjie Wimberly defeated fellow state assemblymember Shavonda Sumter on the second ballot, after the first ended in a tie.

==== Special replacement convention ====
===== Declared =====
- Shavonda Sumter, state assemblymember from the 35th district (2012–present) and candidate for New Jersey's 9th congressional district in 2024
- Benjie Wimberly, Speaker pro tempore of the New Jersey General Assembly (2022–present) from the 35th district (2012–present) and candidate for New Jersey's 9th congressional district in 2024

===== Declined =====
- Andre Sayegh, mayor of Paterson (2018–present) and candidate for New Jersey's 9th congressional district in 2024

==== Endorsements ====
Declined to endorse

U.S. representatives

- Nellie Pou, NJ-09 (2025–present)

Local officials

- Andre Sayegh, mayor of Paterson (2018–present)

==== Convention results ====
Special replacement convention (first ballot)
Party	Candidate	Votes	%
Democratic	Shavonda Sumter	88	50.0%
Democratic	Benjie Wimberly	88	50.0%
Total votes		176 (Note: An additional ballot for Wimberly was later found on the ground, which was uncounted in this total.)	100.0%

Special replacement convention (second ballot)
Party	Candidate	Votes	%
Democratic	Benjie Wimberly	87	50.3%
Democratic	Shavonda Sumter	86	49.7%
Total votes		173	100.0%

==== Democratic primary ====
===== Nominee =====
- Benjie Wimberly, incumbent senator

===== Declined =====
- Shavonda Sumter, state assemblymember from the 35th district (2012–present) and candidate for New Jersey's 9th congressional district in 2024

==== Endorsements ====
Benjie Wimberly

Statewide officials

- Phil Murphy, governor of New Jersey (2018–2026)

State legislators

- Al Abdelaziz, state assemblymember from the 35th district (2025–present)

Local officials

- Orlando Cruz, Passaic County commissioner
- Andre Sayegh, mayor of Paterson (2018–present)
- 2 other mayors

Party chapters

- 2 Democratic Municipal Clubs

Political parties

- Passaic County Democratic Committee

===== Results =====
Democratic primary
Party	Candidate	Votes	%
Democratic	Benjie Wimberly (incumbent)	12,960	100.00%
Total votes		12,960	100.00%

==== Republican primary ====
===== Nominee =====
- Frank Filippelli, entrepreneur

===== Results =====
Republican primary
Party	Candidate	Votes	%
Republican	Frank Filippelli	2,681	100.00%
Total votes		2,681	100.00%

===== Results =====
35th legislative district special general election, 2025
Party	Candidate	Votes	%
Democratic	Benjie Wimberly (incumbent)	31,676	72.60%
Republican	Frank Filippelli	11,957	27.40%
Total votes		43,633	100.00%

== District 1 ==
=== Republican primary ===
==== Declared ====
- Michael Testa, incumbent senator

== District 2 ==
=== Republican primary ===
==== Declared ====
- Vince Polistina, incumbent senator

=== Democratic primary ===
==== Potential ====
- Michael Suleiman, chair of the Atlantic County Democratic Committee

== District 3 ==
=== Democratic primary ===
==== Declared ====
- John Burzichelli, incumbent senator

=== Republican primary ===
==== Publicly expressed interest ====
- Edward Durr, former senator (2022–2024) and candidate for governor in 2025

== District 4 ==
=== Democratic primary ===
==== Potential ====
- Paul D. Moriarty, incumbent senator

== District 5 ==
=== Democratic primary ===
==== Potential ====
- Nilsa Cruz-Perez, incumbent senator

== District 6 ==
=== Democratic primary ===
==== Declared ====
- James Beach, incumbent senator

==== Filed paperwork ====
- Anthony Ken Lee, transportation engineer for the New Jersey Department of Transportation (NJDOT)

==== Potential ====
- Dave Fleisher, mayor of Cherry Hill (if Beach withdraws)
- Jennifer Cooley Fleisher, Camden County commissioner (if Beach withdraws)
- Louis Greenwald, majority leader of the New Jersey General Assembly (2012–present) from the 6th district (1996–present) (if Beach withdraws)
- Melinda Kane, state assemblymember from the 6th district (2025–present) (if Beach withdraws)
- Jonathan Young, Camden County commissioner (if Beach withdraws)

== District 7 ==
=== Democratic primary ===
==== Potential ====
- Troy Singleton, incumbent senator

== District 8 ==
=== Republican primary ===
==== Potential ====
- Latham Tiver, incumbent senator

=== Democratic primary ===
==== Publicly expressed interest ====
- Anthony Angelozzi, state assemblymember from the 8th district (2026–present)

==== Potential ====
- Andrea Katz, state assemblymember from the 8th district (2024–present)

== District 9 ==
=== Republican primary ===
==== Declared ====
- Carmen Amato, incumbent senator

== District 10 ==
=== Republican primary ===
==== Declared ====
- Jim Holzapfel, incumbent senator

==== Potential ====
- Paul Kanitra, state assemblymember from the 10th district (2024–present) (if Holzapfel withdraws)
- Gregory McGuckin, state assemblymember from the 10th district (2012–present) (if Holzapfel withdraws)
- Daniel Rodrick, mayor of Toms River (if Holzapfel withdraws)
- Frank Sadeghi, Ocean County commissioner

== District 11 ==
=== Democratic primary ===
==== Potential ====
- Vin Gopal, incumbent senator

== District 12 ==
=== Republican primary ===
==== Potential ====
- Owen Henry, incumbent senator

== District 13 ==
=== Republican primary ===
==== Potential ====
- Declan O'Scanlon, incumbent senator

== District 14 ==
=== Democratic primary ===
==== Potential ====
- Linda Greenstein, incumbent senator

== District 15 ==
=== Democratic primary ===
==== Potential ====
- Christopher Bobbitt, Lawrence mayor
- Shirley Turner, incumbent senator

== District 16 ==
=== Democratic primary ===
==== Filed paperwork ====
- Andrew Zwicker, incumbent senator

=== Republican primary ===
==== Filed paperwork ====
- Mike Pappas, Bridgewater Township Administrator and former U.S. representative from the 12th congressional district (1997-1999)
- Jeffrey E. Grant, Belle Mead energy engineering executive

== District 17 ==
=== Democratic primary ===
==== Potential ====
- Bob Smith, incumbent senator (decision expected by November 2026)

== District 18 ==
=== Democratic primary ===
==== Declared ====
- Patrick Diegnan, incumbent senator

== District 19 ==
=== Democratic primary ===
==== Nominee ====
- Joe Vitale, incumbent senator

== District 20 ==
=== Democratic primary ===
==== Declared ====
- Joseph Cryan, incumbent senator

==== Endorsements ====
Joseph Cryan

State legislators

- Nicholas Scutari, president of the New Jersey Senate (2022–present) from the 22nd district (2004–present)

== District 21 ==
=== Republican primary ===
==== Declared ====
- Conor Sweeney, Peapack-Gladstone councilman (2025–present)

==== Publicly expressed interest ====
- Jon Bramnick, incumbent senator

=== Democratic primary ===
Declared

- Kimberly Palmieri-Mouded, Union County commissioner

==== Potential ====
- Vincent Kearney, state assemblymember from the 21st district (2026–present)
- Andrew Macurdy, state assemblymember from the 21st district (2026–present)

== District 22 ==
=== Democratic primary ===
==== Declared ====
- Nicholas Scutari, incumbent senator

==== Endorsements ====
Nicholas Scutari

State legislators

- Joseph Cryan, state senator from the 20th district (2018–present)

== District 23 ==
=== Republican primary ===
==== Potential ====
- Doug Steinhardt, incumbent senator

== District 24 ==
=== Republican primary ===
==== Declared ====
- Parker Space, incumbent senator
- Caitlin Statkus, Montague Township school board member

==== Endorsements ====
Parker Space

State legislators

- Anthony Bucco, minority leader of the New Jersey Senate (2023–present) from the 25th district (2019–present)
- Dawn Fantasia, state assemblymember from the 24th district (2024–present)
- Mike Inganamort, state assemblymember from the 24th district (2024–present)

=== Democratic primary ===
==== Declared ====
- Howard Burrell, former mayor of Vernon Township and former Sussex County commissioner

== District 25 ==
=== Republican primary ===
==== Declared ====
- Anthony M. Bucco, incumbent senator

=== Democratic primary ===
==== Potential ====
- Marisa Sweeney, state assemblymember from the 25th district (2026–present)

== District 26 ==
=== Republican primary ===
==== Declared ====
- Jay Webber, state assemblymember from the 26th district (2008–present)

==== Declined ====
- Brian Bergen, state assemblymember from the 26th district (2020–present) (running for re-election)
- Tom Mastrangelo, Morris County commissioner, candidate for New Jersey's 26th assembly district in 2021, and candidate for this district in 2023 (running for state assembly)
- Joe Pennacchio, incumbent senator

==== Endorsements ====
Jay Webber

Party officials

- Peter Murphy, chair of the Passaic County Republican party

Local officials

- 12 mayors

=== Democratic primary ===
==== Publicly expressed interest ====
- Ahmad Saleh, registered nurse

==== Potential ====
- Lauren Barnett, Mountain Lakes councilmember and candidate for New Jersey's 25th assembly district in 2021
- Shari Seffer, Montville Democratic municipal chair
- Michael Soriano, former mayor of Parsippany

== District 27 ==
=== Democratic primary ===
==== Announcement pending ====
- John McKeon, incumbent senator

== District 28 ==
=== Democratic primary ===
==== Potential ====
- Renee Burgess, incumbent senator
- Chigozie Onyema, state assemblymember from the 28th district (2026–present)

== District 29 ==
=== Democratic primary ===
==== Potential ====
- Teresa Ruiz, incumbent senator

== District 30 ==
=== Republican primary ===
==== Potential ====
- Robert Singer, incumbent senator

=== Democratic primary ===
==== Potential ====
- Avi Schnall, state assemblymember from the 30th district (2024–present)

== District 31 ==
=== Democratic primary ===
==== Declared ====
- Angela McKnight, incumbent senator
- Jerry Walker, state assemblymember from the 31st district (2026–present)

==== Potential ====
- William Sampson, state assemblymember from the 31st district (2022–present)

== District 32 ==
=== Democratic primary ===
==== Declared ====
- Raj Mukherji, incumbent senator

==== Declined ====
- Ravinder Bhalla, state assemblymember from the 32nd district (2026–present)
- Katie Brennan, state assemblymember from the 32nd district (2026–present) (running for re-election, endorsed Mukherji)

==== Endorsements ====
Raj Mukherji

Statewide officials

- Mikie Sherrill, governor of New Jersey (2026–present)

State legislators

- Katie Brennan, state assemblymember from the 32nd district (2026–present)
- Craig Coughlin, speaker of the New Jersey General Assembly (2018–present) from the 19th district (2010–present)
- Vin Gopal, state senator from the 11th district (2018–present)
- Brian Stack, state senator from the 33rd district (2008–present) and mayor of Union City (2000–present)

Local officials

- Craig Guy, Hudson County Executive (2024–present) and chair of the Hudson County Democratic Organization (2024–present)
- Emily Jabbour, mayor of Hoboken (2026–present)
- Bill O’Dea, Hudson County commissioner from the 2nd district (1997–present)
- James Solomon, mayor of Jersey City (2026–present)

== District 33 ==
=== Democratic primary ===
==== Potential ====
- Brian Stack, incumbent senator

== District 34 ==
=== Democratic primary ===
==== Potential ====
- Britnee Timberlake, incumbent senator

== District 35 ==
=== Democratic primary ===
==== Potential ====
- Benjie Wimberly, incumbent senator

== District 36 ==
=== Democratic primary ===
==== Potential ====
- Paul Sarlo, incumbent senator

== District 37 ==
=== Democratic primary ===
==== Declared ====
- Gordon Johnson, incumbent senator

== District 38 ==
=== Democratic primary ===
==== Potential ====
- Joseph Lagana, incumbent senator

== District 39 ==
=== Republican primary ===
==== Potential ====
- Holly Schepisi, incumbent senator

== District 40 ==
=== Republican primary ===
==== Potential ====
- Kristin Corrado, incumbent senator

== See also ==
- 2027 New Jersey elections
- 2027 New Jersey General Assembly election
- List of New Jersey state legislatures
