= Albio Sires =

American politician (born 1951)

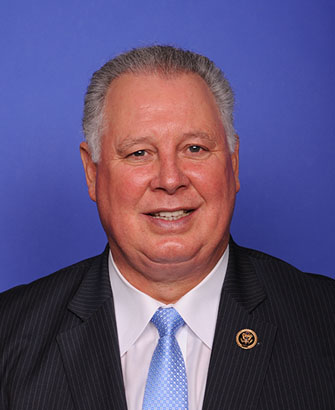
- Official portrait, 2016

Mayor of West New York
- Incumbent
- Assumed office May 16, 2023
- Preceded by: Gabe Rodriguez
- In office May 16, 1995 – November 13, 2006
- Preceded by: Anthony DeFino
- Succeeded by: Silverio Vega

Member of the U.S. House of Representatives from New Jersey
- In office November 7, 2006 – January 3, 2023 (Note: Sires's official service begins on the date of the special election, while he was not sworn in until November 13, 2006.)
- Preceded by: Bob Menendez
- Succeeded by: Rob Menendez
- Constituency: 13th district (2006–2013); 8th district (2013–2023)

167th Speaker of the New Jersey General Assembly
- In office January 8, 2002 – January 10, 2006
- Preceded by: Jack Collins
- Succeeded by: Joseph J. Roberts

Member of the New Jersey General Assembly from the 33rd district
- In office January 11, 2000 – November 13, 2006
- Preceded by: Louis Romano
- Succeeded by: Silverio Vega

Personal details
- Born: January 26, 1951 (age 75) Bejucal, Cuba
- Party: Democratic (before 1985, 1998–present); Republican (1985–1994); Independent (1994–1998)
- Spouse: Adrienne Kole (m. 1986)
- Children: 1
- Education: Saint Peter's University (BA); Middlebury College (MA)

Albio B. Sires (/ˈælbioʊ ˈsɪrɪs/ AL-bee-oh SIRR-iss; born January 26, 1951) is a Cuban-born American businessman and politician serving as the mayor of West New York, New Jersey, since 2023. He previously held the same office from 1995 to 2006. He is a member of the Democratic Party.

Sires represented district 33 in the New Jersey General Assembly from 2000 to 2006, serving as Speaker of the New Jersey House from 2002 to 2006. He then served as the U.S. representative for New Jersey's 8th congressional district from 2006 to 2023. The district, numbered as the 13th district from 2006 to 2013, included most of northern and eastern Jersey City, as well as most of Newark's Latino neighborhoods. He did not seek reelection in 2022.

== Early life ==
Sires was born on January 26, 1951, in Bejucal, Cuba. He immigrated to the United States with his family at age 11 with the help of relatives in the U.S. He eventually settled in West New York, New Jersey; he still lives there, in a town that was 78.08% Hispanic according to the 2010 census. He attended Public School 4, where he and his brother were two of only three Latinos in the school. Sires learned English from a teacher who used flashcards and phonetics, and subsequently attended Memorial High School, where he was a star basketball player, whose skills on the court helped him obtain a basketball scholarship to Saint Peter's College. He received a B.A. in 1974 in Spanish and marketing. He received an M.A. in Spanish from Middlebury College in 1985.

== Early career ==
=== Teaching and business ===
Sires worked at Memorial High School as a teacher and coach. He is the owner of A.M. Title Agency Inc.

=== New Jersey government ===
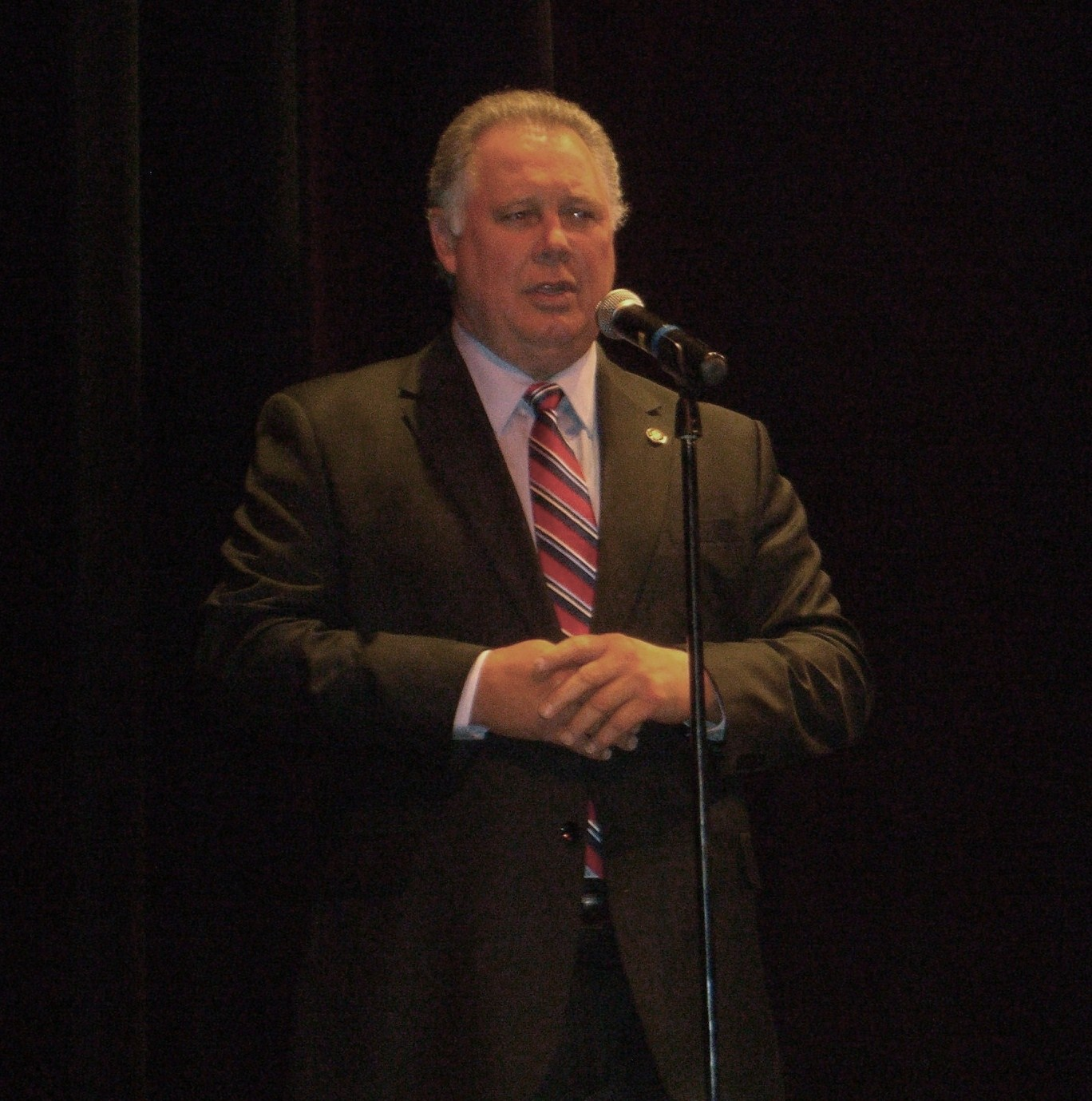
Sires speaking at the inauguration of Brian P. Stack

Sires first ran for office as the Republican nominee for New Jersey's 14th congressional district in 1986.

Sires was the first Hispanic mayor of West New York and in 2004 was elected mayor of the year by his fellow mayors.

Sires served as the Speaker of the Assembly from 2002 to 2006 and was the first Hispanic person to serve as New Jersey's Assembly Speaker. He was considered a surprise pick for speaker, since he had only served one term in the Assembly before taking the position. It has been reported that he was elected as speaker after Governor-elect Jim McGreevey decided he did not want then Assembly Minority Leader Joseph Doria, a former speaker, to serve as speaker during his governorship.

Sires was an active Democrat in the 1970s and 1980s. He switched to the Republican Party in 1985 and ran for Congress in 1986 against Frank Guarini. Sires lost that election, 71% to 26%. Sires left the Republican Party in 1994 and became a registered independent. Sires rejoined the Democratic Party in 1998. Three years later, he became speaker.

During his tenure as speaker, Sires served as acting governor of New Jersey on several occasions, when McGreevey and Richard Codey left the state. He was the first Hispanic person to serve as an acting governor of New Jersey. As acting governor, Sires signed several bills into law and performed routine duties of the office.

For the 2006–08 legislative session, Sires was given the largely honorary title of Speaker Emeritus. He is a former chair of the Legislative Services Commission. Sires stepped down from his seat in the Assembly, and was replaced by Silverio Vega, whom the Democratic district committee chose to replace Sires. Vega was sworn into office on December 11, 2006.

Sires was the mayor of West New York, New Jersey, from 1995 to 2006. He was succeeded by Vega, who will retain his mayoral seat while he simultaneously serves in the Assembly, joining three fellow Hudson County mayors—Brian Stack of Union City in the Assembly and Nicholas Sacco of North Bergen and Joseph Doria of Bayonne in the New Jersey Senate—who serve as both mayors and in the New Jersey Legislature. For many years, it was common for New Jersey mayors to serve in the legislature; this practice of "double dipping" was abolished in 2006, but who had been in both positions before the February 1, 2008, cutoff date were grandfathered in and could retain both jobs. During the time that Sires served in the Assembly, he was paid $49,000 for his state legislative position and $15,000 annually as mayor.

== U.S. House of Representatives ==
=== Tenure ===
Sires had voted with the Democratic Party 93% of the time since joining Congress.

Sires was a member of the Congressional Cuba Democracy Caucus.

Mass transit

Sires is seen as a "champion of mass transit". He supports federal funding for public transportation projects, believing they will help his constituents. He was an advocate for a $9 billion "federal, state and locally-funded public transit tunnel from New Jersey to New York that broke ground in June 2009." The project was expected to employ thousands of people.

In March 2012, Sires pushed for a two-year bill that would help by funding highways and mass transit. He also pushed to extend the surface transportation bill so the House and Senate could reconcile the differences between the House bill and the Moving Ahead for Progress in the 21st Century Act (MAP-21).

Housing

Sires has made affordable housing one of his priorities. Residents of his district pay more for housing—including rent and home prices—than most places in the country. He has supported legislation focused on making housing more affordable.

Iran deal

Sires opposed the nuclear deal with Iran, saying, "I do not feel the agreement will prevent them from acquiring a nuclear weapon."

Nagorno-Karabakh conflict

On October 1, 2020, Sires co-signed a letter to Secretary of State Mike Pompeo that condemned Azerbaijan’s offensive operations against the Armenian-occupied enclave of Nagorno-Karabakh and denounced Turkey’s role in the Nagorno-Karabakh conflict.

=== Committee assignments ===
- Committee on Foreign Affairs
  - Subcommittee on Europe and Eurasia
  - Subcommittee on the Western Hemisphere (Chair)
- Committee on Transportation and Infrastructure
  - Subcommittee on Highways and Transit
  - Subcommittee on Railroads, Pipelines, and Hazardous Materials
- Committee on the Budget

=== Caucus memberships ===
- Congressional Taiwan Caucus (Co-chair)
- Congressional Arts Caucus
- Congressional Hispanic Caucus

=== Political campaigns ===
2006

In 2006, 13-year incumbent Democrat Bob Menendez moved to the United States Senate to fill the seat vacated by Governor of New Jersey Jon Corzine. Sires then entered the race to succeed him. He ran in two Democratic primary elections on June 6, 2006—a special primary for the last two months of Menendez's seventh term, and a regular primary for a full two-year term.

In the special primary to fill the remaining two months, Sires won about 90% of the vote, defeating James Geron. This all but assured Sires of being the next congressman from this heavily Democratic, Latino-majority district. Sires beat Assemblyman and Perth Amboy Mayor Joseph Vas in a bitter primary with 68% of the vote, winning in Union, Hudson and Essex Counties, while Vas won Middlesex County. No Republican even filed, assuring Sires of a full term. The 13th was so heavily Democratic that any Republican candidate would have faced nearly impossible odds.

Sires faced Republican John Guarini—a salesman and second cousin of former Congressman Frank J. Guarini—who was unopposed for the GOP nomination. Vas did not seek the unexpired term seat. After winning the election with 78% of the vote, Sires was sworn into the House on November 13, 2006, to fill the remainder of Menendez's term.

CQPolitics wrote, "Sires’ likely November victories would cap off his ambitions for a House seat, which he first expressed exactly 20 years ago under very different circumstances. He ran that year as the Republican challenger to entrenched incumbent Guarini, but managed only 27 percent of the vote."

Sires is part of a handful of Cuban lawmakers serving in the House, though, other than during the lone term served by Florida's Joe Garcia from 2013 to 2015, he has been the only Democrat.

2010

The New York Times rated the 13th district "solid Democratic" in 2010. Sires was challenged by Republican nominee Henrietta Dwyer; he defeated her with 74% of the vote.

2012

After New Jersey lost a district in the 2010 census, Sires ran for reelection in the 8th district, essentially a reconfigured version of the old 13th. In the primary election, he faced 25-year-old candidate Michael J. Shurin, whose campaign largely focused on the legalization of marijuana.

== Return to local politics ==
Sires ran for and won the 2023 election for mayor of West New York, an office he held before being elected to Congress.

== Electoral history ==
New Jersey's 13th congressional district and New Jersey's 8th congressional district: Results 2006–2020
Year	Democratic	Votes	Pct	Republican	Votes	Pct	3rd Party	Party	Votes	Pct	3rd Party	Party	Votes	Pct	
2006	Albio Sires	77,238	77.5%	John Guarini	19,284	19.4%	Brian Williams	Socialist Workers	1,049	1.1%	Herbert H. Shaw	Politicians Are Crooks	998	1.0%	*
2008	Albio Sires	206,453	75.4%	Joseph Turula	34,375	21.7%	Julio A. Fernandez	Independent	3,661	1.5%	Louis Vernotico	Eliminate the Primary	975	0.4%	
2010	Albio Sires	62,840	68.1%	Henrietta Dwyer	19,538	21.2%	Anthony Zanowic	American Independent	1,508	1.6%	Maximo Nacer	Independent	910	1.0%	
2012	Albio Sires	130,857	78.8%	Maria Karczewski	31,767	19.1%	Herbert Shaw	Independent	1,841	1.1%	Stephen Deluca	Independent	1,710	1.0%	
2014	Albio Sires	61,510	77.4%	Jude Anthony Tiscornia	15,141	19.0%	Herbert Shaw	Independent	1,192	1.5%	Pablo Olivera	Independent	1,022	1.3%	*
2016	Albio Sires	134,733	77.0%	Agha Khan	32,337	18.5%	Pablo Olivera	Independent	4,381	2.5%	Dan Delaney	Libertarian	3,438	2.0%	
2018	Albio Sires	119,881	78.1%	John R. Muniz	28,752	18.7%	Mahmoud Mahmoud	Independent	3,658	2.4%	Dan Delaney	Libertarian	1,191	0.8%	
2020	Albio Sires	176,758	74.0%	Jason Mushnick	58,686	24.6%	Dan Delaney	Libertarian	3,329	1.4%					

Write-in and minor candidate notes: In 2006, Dick Hester (Pro-life Conservative) and Esmat Zaklama (American Party) received 586 and 475 votes respectively. In 2014, independent candidate Robert Thorne received 653 votes.

== Awards and honors ==
On October 4, 2013, Sires's hometown of West New York, New Jersey, honored him by renaming its Public School No. 4 the Albio Sires Elementary School. The school, at 6300 Palisade Avenue, is the elementary school Sires attended as a child. In attendance at the ceremony were West New York Mayor Felix Roque and U.S. Senator Robert Menendez.

== Personal life ==
Sires and his wife, Adrienne, live in West New York, New Jersey.

== See also ==
- List of Hispanic and Latino Americans in the United States Congress

Political offices
Preceded by Jack Collins	Speaker of the New Jersey General Assembly; 2002–2006	Succeeded by Joseph J. Roberts
U.S. House of Representatives
Preceded by Bob Menendez	Member of the U.S. House of Representatives from New Jersey's 13th congressional district 2006–2013	Constituency abolished
Preceded by Bill Pascrell	Member of the U.S. House of Representatives from New Jersey's 8th congressional district 2013–2023	Succeeded by Rob Menendez
U.S. order of precedence (ceremonial)
Preceded by Rush Holt Jr. as Former U.S. Representative	Order of precedence of the United States as Former U.S. Representative	Succeeded by Barbara B. Kennelly as Former U.S. Representative
