= Ned Thomson =

Member of the New Jersey General Assembly

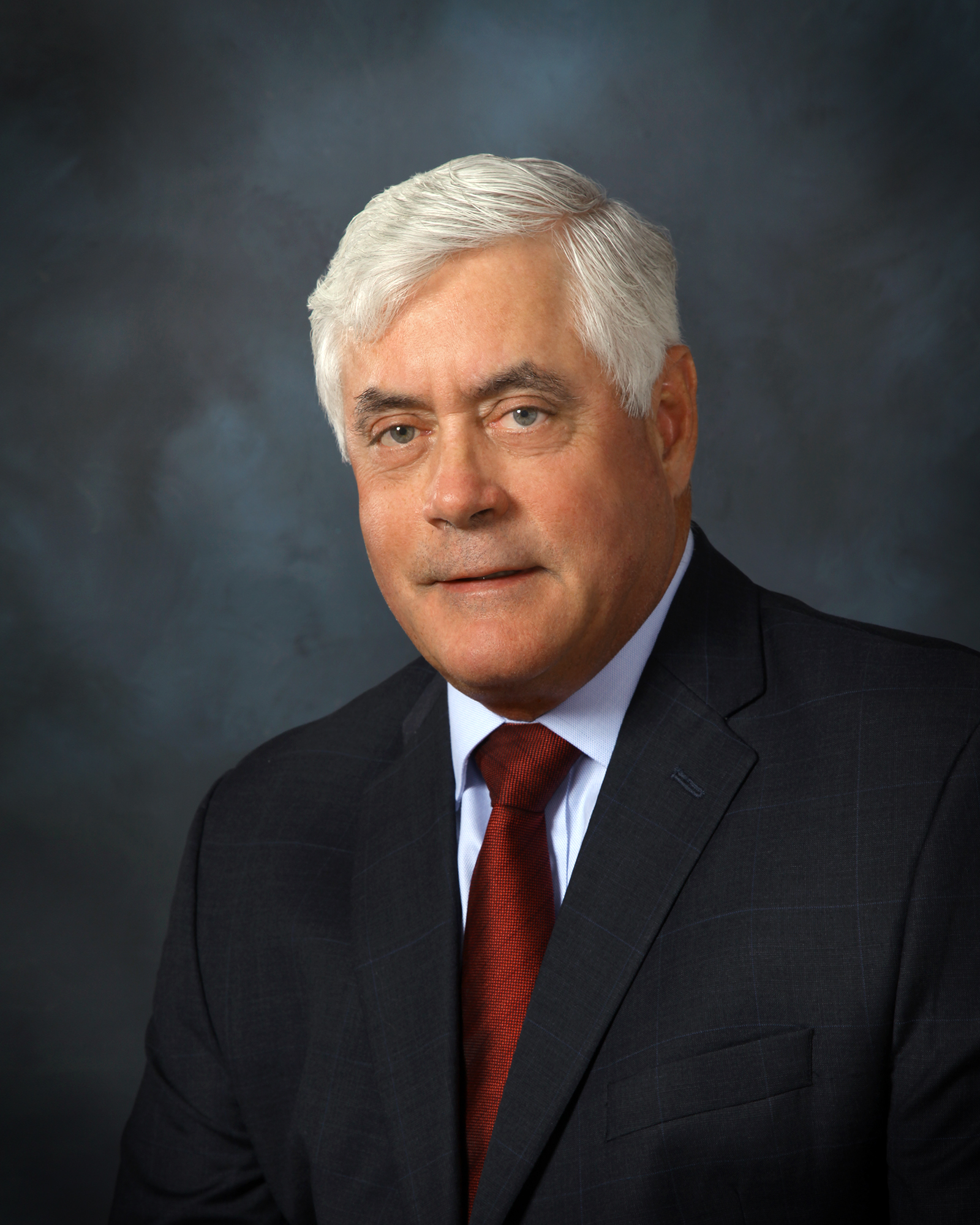

Member of the New Jersey Assembly from the 30th Legislative District
- In office August 24, 2017 – January 9, 2024
- Preceded by: Dave Rible
- Succeeded by: Avi Schnall

Personal details
- Born: July 24, 1953 (age 73) Neptune City, New Jersey
- Party: Republican
- Spouse: Sandi
- Children: Three
- Education: New Jersey Institute of Technology; College of Insurance
- Occupation: Actuary
- Website: Legislative web page

Edward H. Thomson III (born 1953) is an American Republican Party politician who represented the 30th Legislative District in the New Jersey General Assembly from August 24, 2017 to January 9, 2024. He replaced Dave Rible, who left office to serve as Director of the New Jersey Division of Alcoholic Beverage Control. Thomson had previously served as mayor of Wall Township. He has served since 2022 as the Minority Conference Leader in the General Assembly.

== Early life and education ==
Born in Neptune City, New Jersey, Thomson grew up in Avon-by-the-Sea, New Jersey, and attended Ranney School, Neptune High School and Blair Academy. Thomson attended the New Jersey Institute of Technology, where he majored in actuarial science, and the College of Insurance, majoring in business administration.

== Career ==
He served from 1995 to 2017 as a trustee of the New Jersey Public Employees Retirement System. He served on the Wall Township Board of Adjustment from 1990 to 1997 and on the township's Planning Board from 1997 to 2007 and again from 2013 to 2017. He served on the Wall Township Committee from 1998 to 2008, and was chosen by his peers to serve as mayor in 2002 and 2005. Thomson is president of E.H. Thomson and Co., which administers pensions for third party firms.

Having been nominated by Governor of New Jersey Chris Christie in June 2017, Assemblyman Dave Rible resigned his seat on July 17, 2017, to become Director of the New Jersey Division of Alcoholic Beverage Control after being confirmed by the New Jersey Senate. At a special convention held on August 4, Thomson was selected by Republican county committee members on the first ballot to replace Rible from a ballot of three candidates and was selected by acclimation to fill the ballot spot for a full two-year term the November election; for the interim seat, Thomson received 83 of the 154 ballots, ahead of Justin Flancbaum of the Lakewood Municipal Utility Authority with 53 votes and Jim Bean, a former councilmember from Belmar, with 18. He was sworn into office and took his Assembly seat on August 24.

In the November 2017 general election, Thomson (with 30,680 votes; 30.3% of all ballots cast) and his running mate, four-term incumbent Sean T. Kean (with 33,672; 33.3%), defeated Democratic challengers Kevin Scott (18,737; 18.5%) and Eliot Arlo Colon (18,160; 17.9%) to win both Assembly seats from the district for the Republicans.

In the 2023 New Jersey General Assembly election, Thomson lost re-election to Democrat Avi Schnall in what was described as "a major upset". Concurrently, Thomson’s running mates both won re-election (Senator Robert Singer and Assemblyman Sean Kean). Thomson unsuccessfully ran for Assembly again in 2025.

== Election history ==
30th Legislative District General Election, 2023
Party	Candidate	Votes	%
Republican	Sean T. Kean (incumbent)	37,450	39.9
Democratic	Avi Schnall	29,482	31.4
Republican	Edward H. Thomson (incumbent)	18,076	19.3
Democratic	Salvatore Frascino	8,868	9.4
Total votes		93,876	100.0
Republican hold			
Democratic gain from Republican			

2021 New Jersey general election
Party	Candidate	Votes	%	±%
Republican	Sean T. Kean	54,541	36.8	▲0.5
Republican	Edward H. Thomson	52,678	35.5	▲1.7
Democratic	Stephen Dobbins	20,800	14.0	▼0.4
Democratic	Matthew Filosa	20,366	13.7	▼0.1
Total votes		148,385	100.0	

2019 New Jersey general election
Party	Candidate	Votes	%	±%
Republican	Sean T. Kean	25,426	36.3	▲3.0
Republican	Edward H. Thomson	23,662	33.8	▲3.5
Democratic	Steven Farkas	10,063	14.4	▼4.1
Democratic	Yasin “Jason” Celik	9,666	13.8	▼4.1
The Other Candidate	Hank Schroeder	1,213	1.7	N/A
Total votes		70,030	100.0	

New Jersey general election, 2017
Party	Candidate	Votes	%	±%
Republican	Sean T. Kean	33,672	33.3	▼1.2
Republican	Edward H. Thomson III	30,680	30.3	▼3.6
Democratic	Kevin Scott	18,737	18.5	▲2.6
Democratic	Eliot Arlo Colon	18,160	17.9	▲4.2
Total votes		101,249	100.0	

New Jersey General Assembly
Preceded by Dave Rible	Member of the New Jersey General Assembly for the 30th District; August 24, 2017–present With: Sean T. Kean	Succeeded by Avi Schnall
