= 2006 New Jersey's 13th congressional district special election =

- November 7, 2006

New Jersey's 13th congressional district
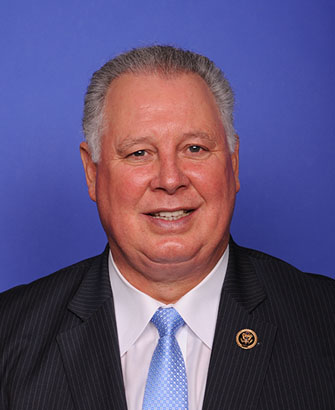

Nominee	Albio Sires	Dick Hester
Party	Democratic	Independent
Popular vote	75,403	2,592
Percentage	96.68%	3.32%
U.S. Representative before election
Bob Menendez
Democratic
Elected U.S. Representative
Albio Sires
Democratic

The 2006 New Jersey's 13th congressional district special election was held on November 7, 2006, to fill the vacant seat in New Jersey's 13th congressional district. The winner will serve in the United States House of Representatives for the remainder of the 110th United States Congress. Democrat Albio Sires won the election to replace Democrat Bob Menendez, who was appointed to the United States Senate in January 2006. Sires also won election to the full term on the same date.

== Democratic primary ==
=== Candidates ===
- James Geron
- Albio Sires, Speaker of the New Jersey General Assembly and mayor of West New York

=== Results ===
2006 Democratic special U.S. House primary
Party	Candidate	Votes	%
Democratic	Albio Sires	24,216	90.15%
Democratic	James Geron	2,647	9.85%
Total votes		26,863	100.00%

== General election ==
=== Candidates ===
- Dick Hester (Independent)
- Albio Sires, Speaker of the New Jersey General Assembly and mayor of West New York (Democratic)

2006 U.S. House special election
Party	Candidate	Votes	%
Democratic	Albio Sires	75,403	96.68%
Independent	Dick Hester	2,592	3.32%
Total votes		77,995	100.00%

==== By county ====
County	Albio Sires Democratic		Dick Hester Other parties		Margin		Total votes cast
County	#	%	#	%	#	%	Total votes cast
Essex (part)	9,798	96.4%	368	3.6%	9,430	93.0%	10,166
Hudson (part)	53,229	97.3%	1,473	2.7%	51,756	94.6%	54,702
Middlsex (part)	8,409	94.0%	537	6.0%	7,872	88.0%	8,946
Union (part)	3,967	94.9%	214	5.1%	3,483	89.8%	4,181
Totals	75,403	96.68%	2,592	3.32%	72,811	93.36%	77,995
