= Larry Wainstein =

American politician

Member of the New Jersey General Assembly from the 33rd district
- Incumbent
- Assumed office January 13, 2026 Serving with Gabe Rodriguez
- Preceded by: Julio Marenco

Personal details
- Party: Democratic
- Website: Legislative webpage

Larry Wainstein is an American businessman and Democratic Party politician who has represented the 33rd Legislative District in the New Jersey General Assembly since taking office in 2026.

Wainstein was raised in Argentina. A resident of Union City, New Jersey, Wainstein graduated from Memorial High School in West New York, New Jersey, and from Saint Peter's University.

Supported by Brian P. Stack, Wainstein announced that he would challenge Democrat incumbent Julio Marenco, who would drop from the race in February 2025. Rodriguez and Wainstein won the June primary, defeating a rival slate of candidates supported by Nicholas Sacco. In the 2025 New Jersey General Assembly election in November, Wainstein and running mate Gabe Rodriguez defeated their Republican opponents by a better than 3–1 margin.
