= Julio Marenco =

American politician

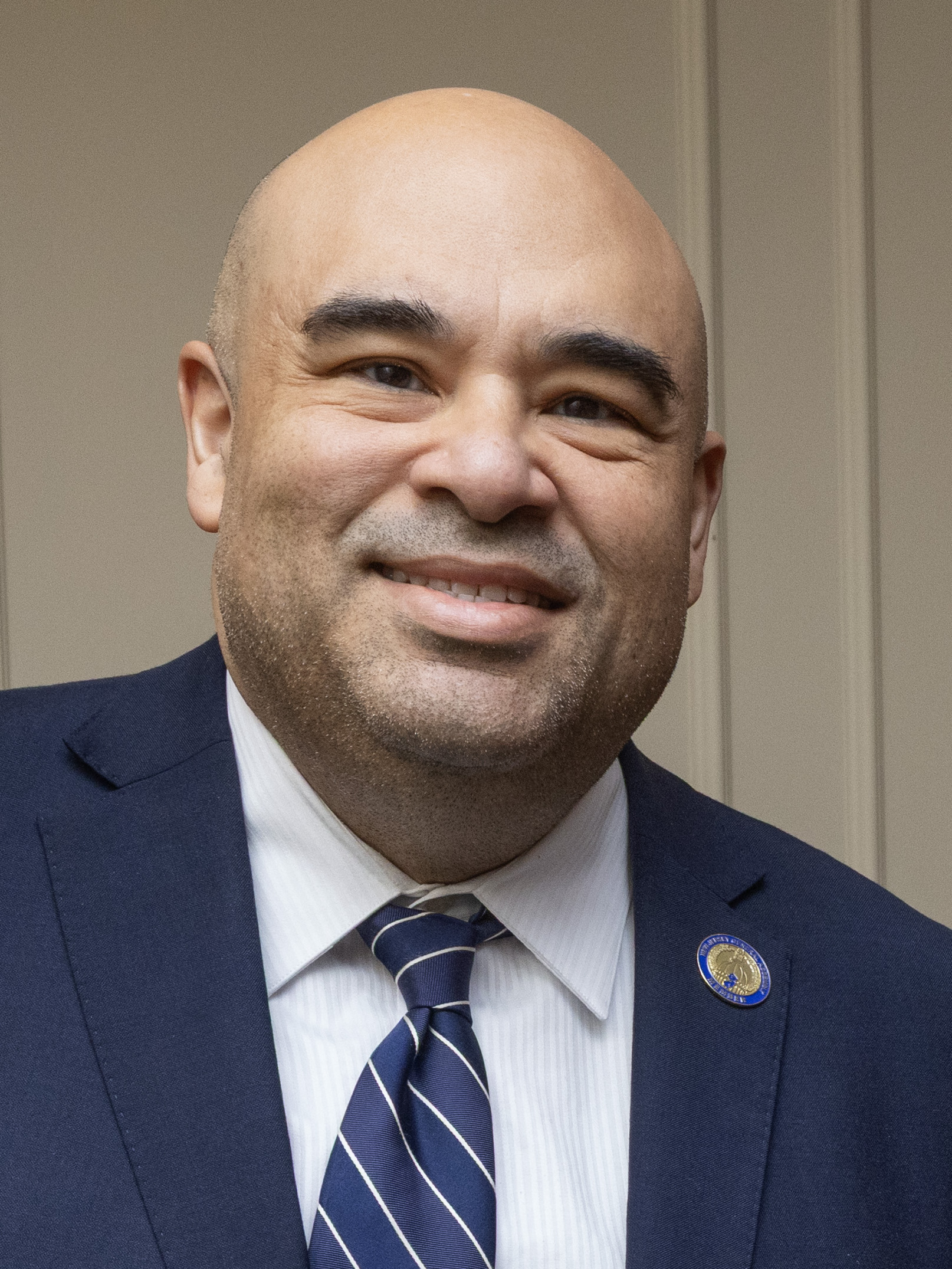
- Marenco in 2025

Member of the New Jersey General Assembly from the 33rd district
- In office January 9, 2024 – January 13, 2026 Serving with Gabe Rodriguez
- Preceded by: Annette Chaparro; Raj Mukherji
- Succeeded by: Larry Wainstein

Personal details
- Party: Democratic
- Education: Montclair State University; Seton Hall University School of Law; Fairleigh Dickinson University
- Website: Legislative webpage

Julio Marenco is an American attorney and Democratic Party politician Who served as a member of the New Jersey General Assembly for the 33rd legislative district from 2024 to 2026.

== Biography ==
Raised in Union City, New Jersey, Marenco served on nuclear submarines in the United States Navy from 1990 to 1994. He earned his undergraduate degree at Montclair State University, a Juris Doctor degree from Seton Hall University School of Law and a master's degree at Fairleigh Dickinson University.

== Elective office ==
As a resident of North Bergen and at the suggestion of Nicholas Sacco, he ran for and won a seat as a trustee on the board of education of the North Bergen School District, serving from 2002 to 2015 and ultimately being chosen as board president, In 2015, he ran with Sacco on a majority Latino slate as a commissioner in North Bergen, serving from 2015 to 2023. He served from 2010 to 2024 on the New Jersey State Parole Board.

In the wake of the 2021 apportionment, the reconfiguration of municipalities in the 33rd and 33rd districts and the incumbent Assembly members in those districts choosing to retire or run for other elective office, the Hudson County Democratic Organization chose newcomers Marenco and Gabe Rodriguez to run for the two Assembly seats. Marenco and Ramirez defeated independent candidate Lea Sherman, the only other candidate running in the 2023 New Jersey General Assembly election. Marenco was one of 27 members elected for the first time in 2023 to serve in the General Assembly, more than one-third of the seats.

In February 2025, Marenco announced that he would drop out of the race for the Democratic nomination, after facing a challenge from Larry Wainstein, who was running with the support of Brian P. Stack.

=== Committees ===
Committee assignments for the 2024—2025 Legislative Session are:

- Public Safety and Preparedness
- Science, Innovation and Technology
- Telecommunications and Utilities

=== District 33 ===
Each of the 40 districts in the New Jersey Legislature has one representative in the New Jersey Senate and two members in the New Jersey General Assembly. The representatives from the 33rd District for the 2024—2025 Legislative Session are:

- Senator Brian P. Stack (D)
- Assemblyman Julio Marenco (D)
- Assemblywoman Gabe Rodriguez (D)

== Electoral history ==
33rd Legislative District General Election, 2023
Party	Candidate	Votes	%
Democratic	Gabe Rodriguez	25,384	49.3
Democratic	Julio Marenco	24,956	48.5
Socialist Workers	Lea Sherman	1,121	2.2
Total votes		51,461	100.0
Democratic hold			
Democratic hold			
