= Felix Roque =

Cuban-American mayor

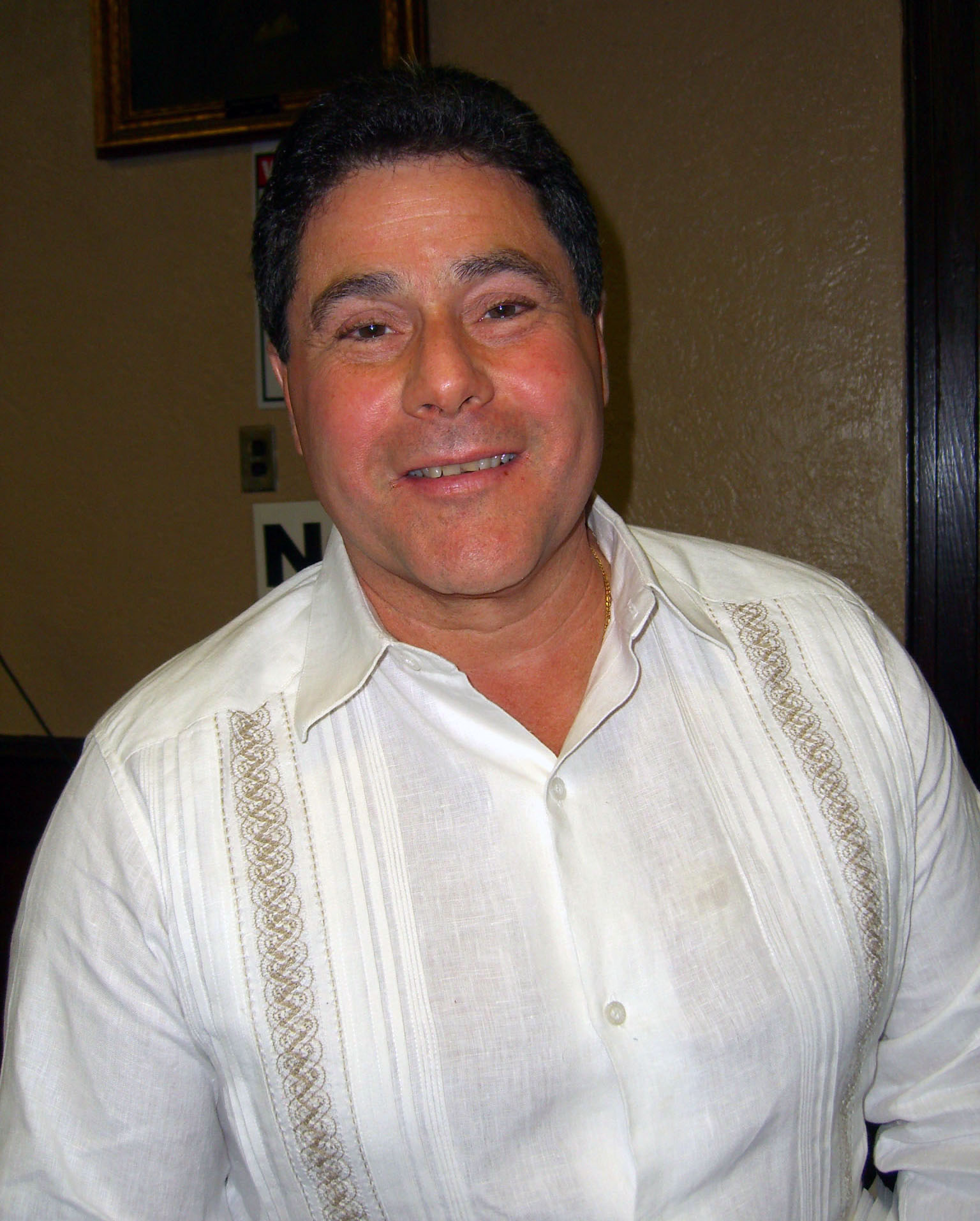
- Roque at a September 19, 2012 Board of Commissioners meeting at West New York City Hall

Mayor of West New York
- In office May 17, 2011 – May 22, 2019
- Preceded by: Silverio Vega
- Succeeded by: Gabe Rodriguez

Personal details
- Born: Cuba
- Party: Democratic
- Education: Universidad Central del Este
- Occupation: Physician

Felix Roque is a Cuban-American medical doctor, U.S. Army Reserve colonel, and Democratic Party politician, and former Mayor of West New York, New Jersey. The five-person slate he led defeated a slate headed by Mayor Silverio Vega in the May 10, 2011, general election and his running mates chose Roque to serve as the town's mayor. Subsequently, to this, his allegiance with Commissioner Count Wiley, who had previously helped him unseat Vega, soured, and Wiley was his chief opponent in the May 2015 election, which Roque won.

In 2012 the Hudson Reporter named him #50 in its list of Hudson County's 50 most influential people. In 2013 he was ranked #57, and in 2014 he and Deputy Mayor Silvio Acosta were tied for #30.

Roque lost his May 2019 re-election bid. Unwilling to concede and contesting the results, he filed for a recount.

== Early life ==
Felix Roque arrived from Cuba in West New York when he was 11 years old. He has a sister, Aida, and a brother, Jorge, who was a plumbing supervisor for the Union City Housing Authority. Jorge died of a heart attack in the morning of January 8, 2012, at the age of 51.

== Medical and military career ==
Dr. Felix E. Roque emigrated from Cuba with his family at the age of 11 and attended Harry L. Bain Elementary School in West New York. He joined the United States Army in 1976, and currently serves a Colonel and Commander of the 4215 Combat Support Hospital in Richmond, Virginia. He completed a four-year Anesthesiology and Pain Management fellowship at Mt. Sinai Hospital, New York. Roque formerly served as the Director of Pain Management at both Palisades Hospital and St. Mary's General Hospital in Passaic, New Jersey.

== Political career ==
On June 9, 2009, Dr. Felix Roque, along with 20 West New York residents and supporters, filed a petition with the West New York Town Clerk to recall the then incumbent Mayor Silverio Vega and his team of Commissioners. The movement that would become known as Together We Can focused on dissolving the alleged corruption that was happening in the Town of West New York. For nearly a year, Dr. Roque and a growing number of supporters of the group began campaigning for the recall of Mayor Vega and his Commissioner team while declaring he would indeed run for Mayor in the upcoming Mayoral election. On April 27 and 28, 2010, the official court proceedings took place. Judge Maurice Gallipoli dismissed the case on a technicality, as Roque's campaign had not collected sufficient signatures for the recall.

Roque ran against Vega in the 2011 election, and on May 10, 2011, Roque and his team defeated incumbent Mayor Silverio Vega and his team of Commissioners. Roque's victory surprised many in the community, with Vega spokesman and political consultant Paul Swibinski attributing the election results to the raising of taxes in February 2009, while other sources attributing Roque's victory to the fact that the Hudson County Democratic Organization did not assist Vega in fending off Roque's challenge.

In his first year as Mayor of West New York, Roque was able to reach out to Governor Chris Christie numerous times while receiving several of his visits to West New York. On December 6, 2011, Roque, along with Mayor Richard Turner of Weehawken and Mayor Brian P. Stack of Union City and several other community leaders from nearby towns, arranged a Town Hall-style meeting with Governor Christie, who addressed two bills which he claimed "would keep taxes more level", including his controversial overhaul of public pensions and benefits.

On March 23, 2012, Roque held a press conference from Town Hall addressing several visits from FBI agents to town. Although many conflicting reports were published as the reason for these visits, including some personally implicating Roque's private medical practice, Roque explained that the visits were not related to his practice. FBI spokesman Briar Travers confirmed the FBI's presence in West New York but decline to give any details in the investigation. In an interview with The Jersey Journal, Roque stated that the FBI's presence was possibly "politically motivated" and disclosed that despite several media outlets reporting as so, no personal documentation or computer equipment had been requested or retrieved from any Municipal of private facility.

By July 2012, many who supported Roque as a reformer came to turn against him, amid Roque's endorsement of Republican state Senator Joe Kyrillos over Democratic U.S. Senator Robert Menendez during the 2012 Senate race. Roque eventually reversed his endorsement, apparently under significant pressure from his closest political allies, who were loyal to Menendez. In a late June 2010 reorganization meeting, Roque and the majority of the five-member board voted to reassign each commissioner to a new department, including Commissioner Count Wiley, who ran with Roque on his 2010 ticket, who was removed from the Department of Public Works. Wiley had to be restrained by police officers. The Hudson Reporter characterized Wiley as "the latest victim in what many see as Roque's desperate attempt to root out political enemies".

On May 24, 2012, the United States Attorney's Office announced that it had arrested Roque and his son, Joseph Roque, for allegedly hacking into an e-mail account and website associated with a movement to recall the mayor. The complaint alleges that Dr. Roque and his son conspired to hack into and take down the website and to identify, intimidate and harass those who operated and were associated with the website. Roque would be acquitted of the charges in October 2013, though his son was convicted.

On September 13, 2012, Count Wiley formally launched a recall campaign against Roque, during which he would run to replace Roque as Mayor. According to The Hudson Reporter, Roque has been criticized for maintaining a full-time medical practice that, along with his inexperience, diminishes his effectiveness as Mayor. Tempers flared between the two politicians at an October 10 Board of Commissioners meeting, where the board majority passed a 4-1 resolution censuring Wiley for conduct unbecoming of an elected official, following Wiley's admission earlier in the month that some North Bergen employees painted his house the previous year, explaining that it was part of a "shared services" agreement with North Bergen. At the same meeting Wiley threatened to file a civil suit against West New York for threatening to dissolve his office. Wiley also charged that a resolution to place Roque's sister, Aida Roque on the town's Planning Board was a conflict of interest. Wiley and his allies presented their recall petitions with over 6,500 signatures to Town Hall on September 18, 2013, but over 40 percent of them were invalidated because they did not come from registered voters, ending the recall.

Roque announced in August 2014 that he would seek reelection. Roque won the election on May 12, 2015 with 2,871 votes. His commissioners received the next four highest votes: Gabe Rodriguez with 2,796, Cosmo Cirillo with 2,755, Susan Colacurcio with 2,734 and Margarita Guzman with 2,589. The next highest number of votes was attained by Wiley, who was seen as Roque's chief opponent.

Roque lost his May 2019 re-election bid. Unwilling to concede and contesting the results, he filed for a recount.
