= Gabe Rodriguez =

American politician from New Jersey

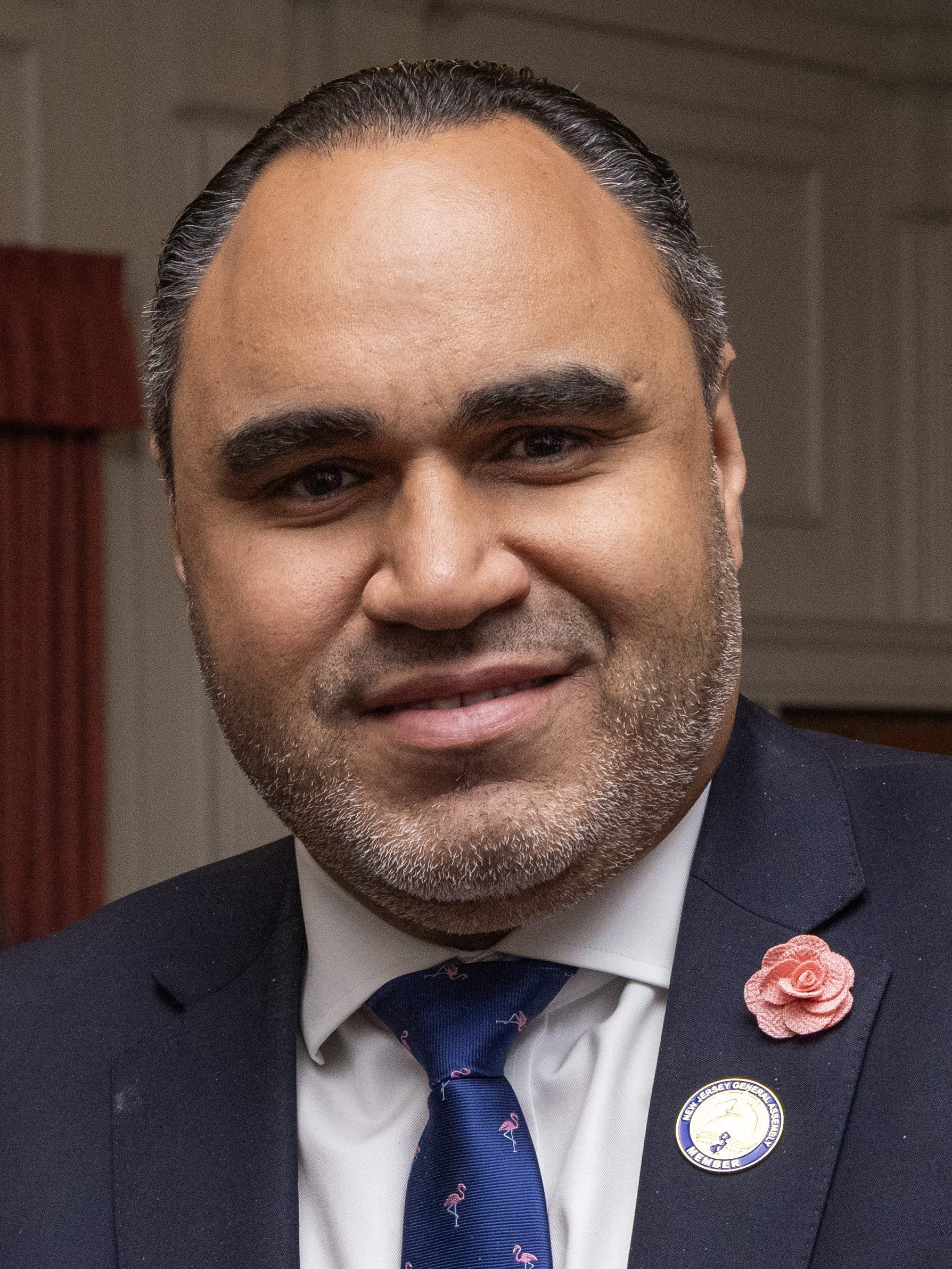
- Rodriguez in 2025

Member of the New Jersey General Assembly from the 33rd district
- Incumbent
- Assumed office January 9, 2024 Serving with Larry Wainstein
- Preceded by: Annette Chaparro; Raj Mukherji

Mayor of West New York
- In office May 22, 2019 – May 16, 2023
- Preceded by: Felix Roque
- Succeeded by: Albio Sires

Personal details
- Born: December 6, 1978 (age 47)
- Party: Democratic
- Education: New Jersey City University; New Jersey Institute of Technology
- Website: Legislative webpage

Gabriel “Gabe” Rodriguez born December 6, 1978) is an American Democratic Party politician serving as a member of the New Jersey General Assembly for the 33rd legislative district, having taken office on January 9, 2024.

== Biography ==
Born on December 6, 1978, Rodriguez earned an undergraduate degree in psychology from New Jersey City University and a Master of Business Administration degree from New Jersey Institute of Technology.

A resident of West New York, New Jersey, Rodriguez is employed by the West New York School District as an accounting manager.

== Elective office ==
Rodriguez served for four years as a West New York town commissioner and was elected as mayor in 2019.

In the wake of the 2021 apportionment, the reconfiguration of municipalities in the 32nd and 33rd districts and the incumbent Assembly members in those districts choosing to retire or run for other elective office, the Hudson County Democratic Organization chose newcomers Rodriguez and Julio Marenco to run for the two Assembly seats. Marenco and Rodriguez defeated independent candidate Lea Sherman, the only other candidate running in the 2023 New Jersey General Assembly election. Rodriguez was one of 27 members elected for the first time in 2023 to serve in the General Assembly, more than one-third of the seats.

=== Committees ===
Committee assignments for the 2026—2027 Legislative Session are:

- Budget
- Health
- Oversight, Reform and Federal Relations

=== District 33 ===
Each of the 40 districts in the New Jersey Legislature has one representative in the New Jersey Senate and two members in the New Jersey General Assembly. The representatives from the 33rd District for the 2024—2025 Legislative Session are:

- Senator Brian P. Stack (D)
- Assembly Member Julio Marenco (D)
- Assembly Member Gabe Rodriguez (D)

== Electoral history ==
33rd Legislative District General Election, 2023
Party	Candidate	Votes	%
Democratic	Gabe Rodriguez	25,384	49.3
Democratic	Julio Marenco	24,956	48.5
Socialist Workers	Lea Sherman	1,121	2.2
Total votes		51,461	100.0
Democratic hold			
Democratic hold			

33rd Legislative District General Election, 2025
Party	Candidate	Votes	%
Democratic	Gabe Rodriguez	39.731	38.0
Democratic	Larry Wainstein	38.926	37.2
Republican	Cynthia Depice	12.903	12.3
Republican	Anthony Valdes	12,797	12.2
	write-in	169	0.16
Total votes		104,526	100.0
