= Silverio Vega =

American politician (born 1956)

Silverio A. Vega
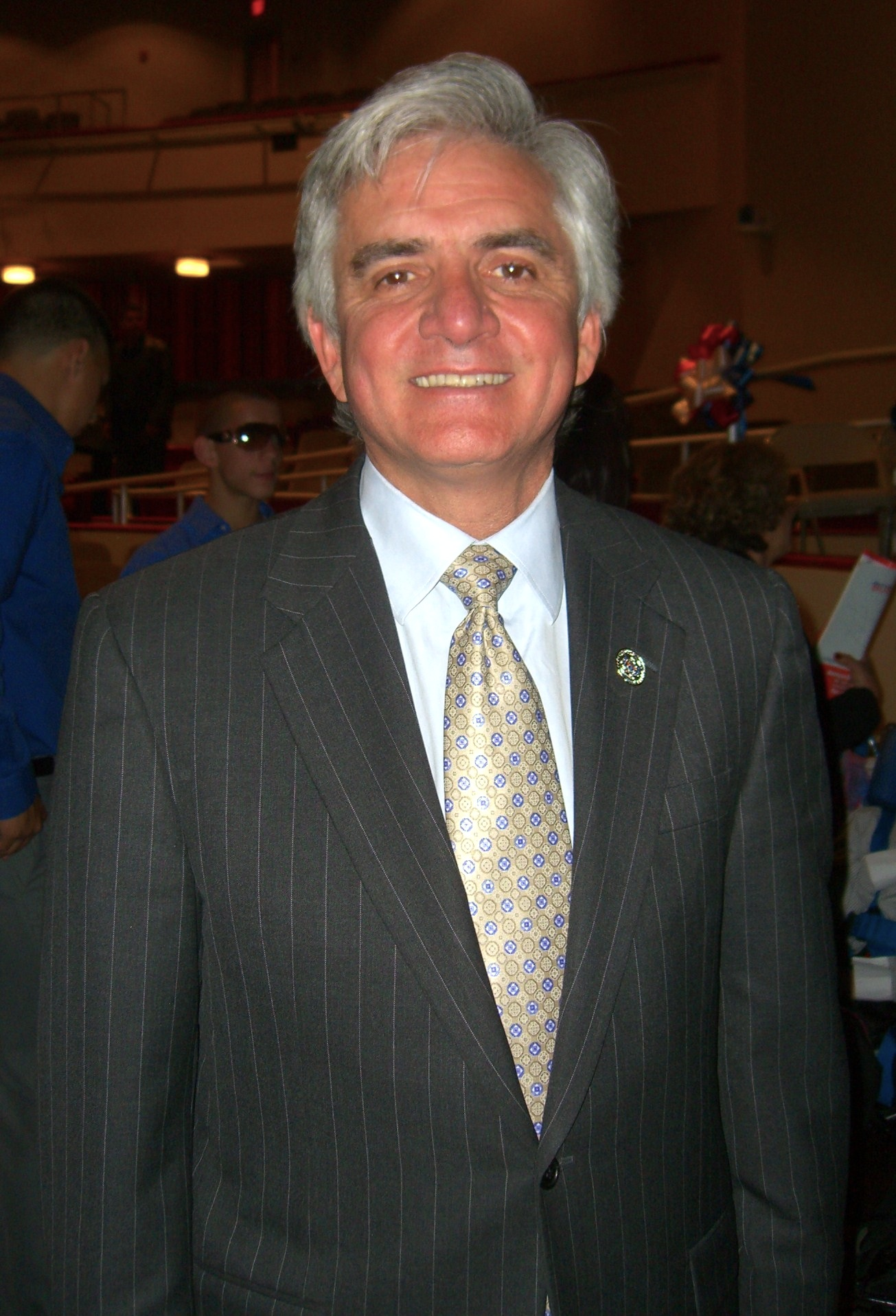
- Vega in 2010

Mayor of West New York
- In office November 13, 2006 – May 17, 2011
- Preceded by: Albio Sires
- Succeeded by: Felix Roque

Member of the New Jersey General Assembly from the 33rd district
- In office December 11, 2006 – January 7, 2008
- Preceded by: Albio Sires
- Succeeded by: Ruben J. Ramos; Caridad Rodriguez

Personal details
- Born: September 4, 1956 (age 70) Cardenas, Matanzas, Cuba
- Party: Democratic
- Education: University of Tennessee
- Occupation: Educator

Silverio "Sal" A. Vega (4 September 1956 in Cardenas, Matanzas, Cuba) is a Cuban American Democratic Party politician, who served in the New Jersey General Assembly from 2006 to 2008, where he represented the 33rd legislative district and served on the Law and Public Safety Committee. He also served as the mayor of West New York. Vega lost a re-election bid May 10, 2011 to challenger Dr. Felix Roque.

== Career ==
Vega has been a resident of the Town of West New York since 1967, when he emigrated from Cuba with his family. He received a Bachelor of Science degree from the University of Tennessee in Physical Education. Vega has served a school administrator for the West New York School District. Since 1987, he has been athletic director for his alma mater, Memorial High School.

Vega had served as a Legislative Aide to New Jersey State Senator Bernard Kenny. Previously, Vega had been appointed to the Board of Adjustments and the Rent Control Board by the Town of West New York, and to the board of trustees of the Hudson County Schools of Technology (formerly Hudson County Vocational-Technical). Vega was a Commissioner for the Town of West New York, serving as Public Safety Director from 1995 until 2006. Previously, Vega was the director of the Department of Revenue & Finance, from 1991 to 1995.

After Albio Sires was elected to fill the seat in New Jersey's 13th congressional district that had been vacated by Bob Menendez, Sires stepped down from his positions as Mayor of West New York and in the General Assembly, where he represented the 33rd legislative district. Vega was chosen to replace Sires as mayor of West New York. The Democratic district committee voted on November 21, 2006, to choose Vega to replace Sires in the Assembly, with Vega taking office on December 11, 2006.

=== Freeholder ===
Chairman Vega represented the freeholder interests for the Hudson County Schools of Technology as a Member of the Hudson County Board of School Estimate, and for the Community College as a Member of the Hudson County Community College Board of School Estimate. He also serves as chairman of the following committees: Finance, Budget and Administration; Insurance Commission; Public Safety and Department of Corrections; and as Alternate on the New Jersey Association of Counties (NJAC). He serves as a Member on the Economic Development and Housing Committee.

Before being named to the Assembly, Vega represented District 7 on the Hudson County, New Jersey Board of Chosen Freeholders. District 7 includes the Town of Guttenberg, the Township of Weehawken and the Town of West New York. Vega served his eighth year as chairman of the Board of Freeholders, the longest serving chairman in county history. Vega resigned from his position as Freeholder as of 5:00 p.m. on November 21, 2006, and West New York Commissioner Gerald Lange, Jr. replaced Vega as Freeholder.

=== Recall of Mayor Vega ===
On June 9, 2009, West New York physician and resident Dr. Felix Roque, along with a group of 20 supporters filed petition papers with the West New York town clerk to recall Mayor Vega and his four commissioners. Dr. Roque's movement, also known as the "Together We Can" campaign, was given a period of 160 days to collect signatures from 25% of the registered voter population. Together We Can Pending a successful recall petition, Dr. Roque intended to run against Mayor Vega during the upcoming Mayoral elections. Roque was spurred to this action by the town's high taxes.

On April 27, 2010, official court proceedings began regarding the case of Committee To Recall Silverio A. Vega; Gerald A Lange; Lawrence Riccardi; Alberto Rodriguez, Michelle Fernandez-Lopez From The Office Of Commissioner Against Carmela Riccie, In The Capacity Of Recall Election Official of The Town Of West New York. During the first day of trial, appointed judge Hon. Maurice Gallipoli, adhered to the fact that the recall committee had successfully acquired more than enough signatures required to initiate a recall based on the testimony and lengthy analysis of the single witness Carlos Diego J. Perez Monasterio. Numerous challenges were raised by the defense with the inclusion of resident's signatures not matching the Statewide Voter Registration Database which prompted Judge Gallipoli to grant the Recall Committee a second day of proceedings to fix affidavit forms required to include the names of the 110 registered voters deemed invalid by Town Clerk Carmela Riccie.

During the second day of trial, after the acceptance of the fixed affidavit forms, the 110 registered voter's signatures were granted to the committee only to have a number of other issues introduced by the defense with the supporting testimony of Town Clerk Carmela Riccie. These new challenges disallowed the submission of over 400 valid signatures into the total therefore reducing the number below the mark needed to initiate the recall. The lack of a timed evidence submission to the contrary by the committee's attorney, Arthur Neiss, into court prompted Gallipoli to disallow any testimony that would have reinstated the number of signatures in question back in the final total. Based on this decision to disallow any new testimony, Judge Gallipoli ruled that regardless of the number of signatures above the number required, the committee was being penalized for the failure to comply with the case management order. 444 signatures that would otherwise had been counted, were to be deducted from the grand total. This proved to be the fatal blow in the Committee's, case which reduced all totals below the needed mark and being granted a dismissal by Judge Gallipoli.

=== 2011 election ===
On May 10, 2011, Vega and his Board of Commissioners lost the election to Roque and his commissioners, surprising many in the community. Vega's spokesman and political consultant Paul Swibinski attributed the election results to the raising of taxes in February 2009, while other sources felt that results were attributable to the fact that the Hudson County Democratic Organization did not assist Vega in fending off Roque's challenge.
