= New Jersey Legislature =

Bicameral legislature of New Jersey

Type
- Type: Bicameral
- Houses: Senate; General Assembly

Leadership
- Senate President: Nicholas Scutari (D) since January 11, 2022
- Assembly Speaker: Craig Coughlin (D) since January 9, 2018

Structure
- Seats: 120
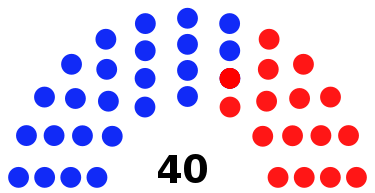
- Senate political groups: Democratic (25); Republican (15)
- General Assembly political groups: Democratic (57); Republican (23)

Elections
- Last Senate election: November 7, 2023
- Last General Assembly election: November 4, 2025
- Next Senate election: November 2, 2027
- Next General Assembly election: November 2, 2027

Meeting place
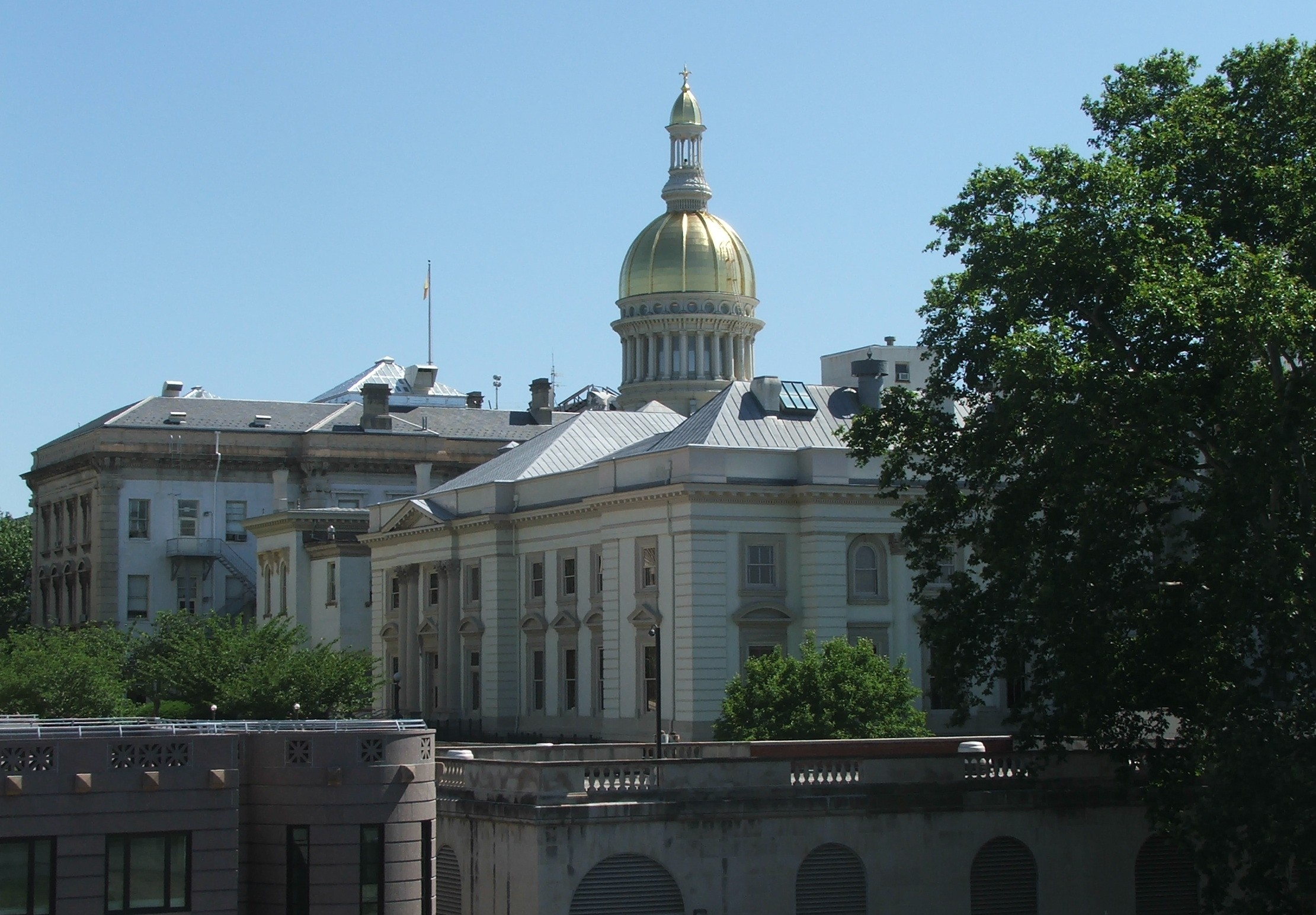
- New Jersey State House; Trenton

Website
- www.njleg.state.nj.us

The New Jersey Legislature is the legislative branch of the government of the U.S. state of New Jersey. In its current form, as defined by the New Jersey Constitution of 1947, the Legislature consists of two houses: the General Assembly and the Senate. The Legislature meets in the New Jersey State House, in the state capital of Trenton.

== History ==
=== Colonial period ===
The New Jersey Legislature was established in 1702 upon the surrender by the Proprietors of East Jersey and those of West Jersey of the right of government to Queen Anne. Anne's government united the two colonies as the Province of New Jersey, a royal colony, establishing a new system of government.

The instructions from Queen Anne to Viscount Cornbury, the first royal governor of New Jersey, outlined a fusion of powers system, which allowed for an overlap of executive, legislative and judicial authority. It provided for a bicameral legislature consisting of an appointed Council and an elected General Assembly.

The Provincial Council consisted of twelve members, appointed by and serving at the pleasure of the British crown. With the exception of resignations and those being removed for cause, councilors often served for life. The former provinces of East and West Jersey were reorganized as the Eastern Division and the Western Division, respectively, of the Province of New Jersey. Councilors were apportioned that six would come from each of the two divisions. In practice, however, this was not always followed.

The Assembly initially consisted of 24 members with two each elected in the Cities of Burlington and Perth Amboy, and ten at-large from each of the two divisions. As this system proved unwieldy for holding elections, in 1709 the Assembly was reapportioned; Burlington and Perth Amboy would retain their two seats each; the Town of Salem had two, and two for each of the nine counties. The number of members remained at 24, with a total of twelve from each division. In his instructions to Governor William Burnet, King George I recommended the reapportionment of Salem's seats to the recently formed Hunterdon County; this was passed into law on February 10, 1727/28. Membership continued at 24 until 1768, when it was expanded to 30 by the addition of two representatives each from Morris, Cumberland and Sussex Counties. This apportionment remained until superseded by the Constitution of 1776.

The Governor had the authority to summon the Legislature, and dissolve the Assembly and call new elections.

On December 6, 1775, Governor William Franklin prorogued the New Jersey Legislature until January 3, 1776, but it never met again. On May 30, 1776, Franklin attempted to convene the legislature, but was met instead with an order by the New Jersey Provincial Congress for his arrest. On July 2, 1776, the Provincial Congress approved a new constitution which ordered new elections; on August 13 an entirely new legislature was elected.

=== Provincial Congress and the Constitution of 1776 ===
In 1775, representatives from New Jersey's 13 counties established a Provincial Congress to supersede the Royal Governor. In June 1776, this congress had authorized the preparation of a constitution, which was written within five days, adopted by the Provincial Congress, and accepted by the Continental Congress. The Constitution of 1776 provided for a bicameral legislature consisting of a General Assembly with three members from each county and a legislative council with one member from each county. All state officials, including the governor, were to be appointed by the Legislature under this constitution. The Vice-President of Council would succeed the governor (who was the President of the Council) if a vacancy occurred in that office.

Accordingly, the first session of the legislature convened on August 27, 1776. Legislative politics was defined in the following years by an intense rivalry between the Federalists, and later the Whigs (which dominated South Jersey and Essex, Hudson, and Middlesex Counties), and the Democratic Party (which was prominent in the northwest, the Shore region, and Bergen County).

=== The Constitution of 1844 ===
The New Jersey Constitution of 1844 provided for a direct popular election of the governor, and gave him the power to veto bills passed by the legislature. The General Assembly was expanded to 60 members, elected annually, and apportioned to the counties based on population. The Legislative Council was renamed the Senate, and was to be composed of one member from each of the state's 19 counties, serving a three-year term.

During the Civil War, party allegiance became entrenched. Democrats usually won both houses until the Republicans gained control in 1893. A court ruling obtained by the Republicans provided that members of the General Assembly were to be elected from the counties at large, rather than from election districts of unequal population.

Regardless of any changes, the legislature met infrequently, had high turnover among its members, and was far from being the most influential or powerful organ of state government.

=== New Jersey Constitution of 1947 and modern developments ===
New Jersey adopted its current constitution in 1947. Under this constitution, the governor was given additional veto powers and the ability to serve two terms. Hundreds of independent agencies were consolidated into 20 principal executive departments under the control of the governor. Senators' terms were extended to four years; assemblymen's terms to two years.

In 1966, the Senate was expanded from 21 to 40 members and the General Assembly from 60 to 80. Following a United States Supreme Court decision in 1964 and a New Jersey Supreme Court decision in 1972, the state's legislative districts were reapportioned into the current arrangement. Two more modern developments have also helped shape the Legislature: the increase in the importance of legislative committees and the development of longer tenures for the legislative leadership.

==== New Jersey Legislative Youth Council ====
In 2022, the legislature passed the New Jersey Legislative Youth Council Act, which established the New Jersey Youth Council, a youth advisory body to the New Jersey Legislature made up of 40 public members aged 15 to 23, each from one of the state's legislative districts. The council is set to meet for the first time in 2023 and submit an annual report to the legislature regarding its findings.

== Organization ==
The legislative districts of New Jersey following 2021 redistricting

=== Powers ===
The Legislature has the power to enact laws by a majority vote of both houses, subject to the Governor of New Jersey's ability to veto a bill. A veto may be overridden by the Legislature if there is a two-thirds majority in favor of overriding in each House.

By a three-fifths vote of each house, the Legislature may propose an amendment to the Constitution of New Jersey. Alternatively, it may propose an amendment by a majority vote two consecutive years. In either case, the amendment is placed on the ballot and must be approved in a referendum to become a part of the constitution.

The Legislature is also empowered to ratify amendments to the U.S. Constitution, appoint the State Auditor, judge the elections and qualifications of its members, and institute and conduct impeachment proceedings against State officials. The Senate has the sole authority to confirm or reject gubernatorial nominees for judicial and some executive positions.

=== Houses, members, and qualifications ===
The current organization of the Legislature is outlined by Article IV ("Legislative") of the New Jersey State Constitution of 1947. The Legislature is composed of an 80-member General Assembly and a 40-member Senate. To become a member of the Assembly, an individual must be at least 21 years old, must have resided in their district for one year and the state for two years, and must live in the represented district. To become a Senator, an individual must be 30 years old, must have lived in their district for two years and the state for four years, and again must live in the represented district.

=== Elections and terms ===
Unlike elections for most other state legislatures and for the United States Congress, New Jersey legislative elections are held in November of every odd-numbered year. Assembly members serve two-year terms, while Senators serve four-year terms, except in the first term of a new decade, which only lasts two years. This "2-4-4" cycle was put into place so Senate elections can reflect changes made to district boundaries following the decennial United States Census. If this cycle were not in place, then the boundaries could at times be up to four years out of date before being used for Senate elections. Under the current system, the boundaries are only ever two years out of date.

The New Jersey Constitution provides that each Legislature is constituted for a term of two years, split into two annual sessions. Because the Constitution also specifies that all business from the first year may be continued into the second year, the distinction between the two annual sessions is more ceremonial than actual. The two-year legislative term begins at noon on the second Tuesday in January of each even-numbered year. For example, the two-year term of the 215th Legislative session began on noon on Tuesday, January 10, 2012. At the end of the second year, all unfinished business expires.

=== Salary and costs ===
Service as a State Senator or Member of the General Assembly is considered to be part-time, and most legislators have other employment. Effective 2002, State Senators and Members of the General Assembly receive an annual base salary of $49,000 with the Senate President and the Assembly Speaker earning slightly more (1/3 over the base). This was an increase from $35,000, which had been in effect since 1990. Beginning in 2026, the base salary will increase to $82,000. Additionally, each legislator receives an annual allowance of $150,000 for staff salaries. In the 2025 Fiscal Year, the total cost of the Legislature in the state budget was $127,346,000. Of this amount, $18,690,000 was appropriated to the State Senate for salaries and other costs, and $25,208,000 was appropriated to the General Assembly.

In New Jersey, legislators previously could also concurrently hold another elected office at the county or municipal level. The practice, which is frequently referred to as "double dipping", was banned by the Legislature in 2008, although the 19 legislators holding multiple offices as of February 1, 2008, were grandfathered into the system. As of 2025, 3 of these legislators remain in office: Senators Paul Sarlo and Brian P. Stack, and Assemblyman Gary Schaer.

=== Leadership ===
The General Assembly is headed by a speaker, while the Senate is headed by a president. Each house also has a majority leader, a minority leader, assistant leaders, and whips.

=== Legislative districts ===
Members of the New Jersey Legislature are chosen from 40 electoral districts. Each district elects one Senator and two Assemblymen. New Jersey is one of seven U.S. states (with Arizona, Idaho, Maryland, North Dakota, South Dakota, and Washington) in which districts for the upper and lower house of the legislature are coterminous. Districts are redefined decennially by the New Jersey Apportionment Commission following each U.S. census, as provided by Article IV, Section III of the State Constitution.

== Current legislature ==
The sitting Legislature is the 222nd New Jersey Legislature.

=== Senate ===
The New Jersey Senate was established as the upper house of the New Jersey Legislature by the Constitution of 1844, replacing the Legislative Council. There are 40 legislative districts, representing districts with average populations of 232,225 (2020 figure). Each district has one senator and two members of the New Jersey General Assembly, the lower house of the legislature. Prior to the election in which they are chosen, senators must be a minimum of 30 years old and a resident of the state for four years to be eligible to serve in office.

From 1844 until 1965 (when the Reynolds v. Sims US Supreme Court decision mandated all state legislators be elected from districts of roughly equal population), each county was an electoral district electing one senator. Under the 1844 Constitution the term of office was three years, which was changed to four years with the 1947 Constitution. Since 1968 the Senate has consisted of 40 senators, who are elected in a "2-4-4" cycle. Senators serve a two-year term at the beginning of each decade, with the rest of the decade divided into two four-year terms. The "2-4-4" cycle was put into place so that Senate elections can reflect the changes made to the district boundaries on the basis of the decennial United States Census. If the cycle were not put into place, then the boundaries would sometimes be four years out of date before being used for Senate elections. Rather, with the varied term, the boundaries are only two years out of date. Thus elections for Senate seats take place in years ending with a "1", "3", or "7" (i.e. next elections in 2023, 2027, and 2031).

Interim appointments are made to fill vacant legislative seats by the county committee or committees of the party of the vacating person (since a constitutional amendment passed on November 8, 1988). The office is on the ballot for the next general election, even if the other Senate seats are not up for election in that year (such as in years ending with a "5" or "9", such as 2009 or 2015). The sole exception to this is if the vacancy occurred within 51 days of the election, in which case the appointment stands until the following general election.

=== General Assembly ===
Since the election of 1967 (1968 Session), the Assembly has consisted of 80 members. Two members are elected from each of New Jersey's 40 legislative districts for a term of two years, each representing districts with average populations of 232,225 (2020 figures), with deviation in each district not exceeding 3.21% above and below that average. To be eligible to run, a potential candidate must be at least 21 years of age, and must have lived in their district for at least one year prior to the election, and have lived in the state of New Jersey for two years. They also must be residents of their districts. Membership in the Assembly is considered a part-time job, and many members have employment in addition to their legislative work. Assembly members serve two-year terms, elected every odd-numbered year in November. Four current members of the Assembly hold other elective office, as they are grandfathered in under a New Jersey law that banned multiple office holding in 2007.

The Assembly is led by the Speaker of the Assembly, who is elected by the membership of the chamber. After the Lieutenant Governor of New Jersey and the President of the New Jersey Senate, the Speaker of the Assembly is third in the line of succession to replace the Governor of New Jersey in the event that the governor is unable to execute the duties of that office. The Speaker decides the schedule for the Assembly, which bills will be considered, appoints committee chairmen, and generally runs the Assembly's agenda. The current Speaker is Craig Coughlin (D-Woodbridge Township).

== See also ==
- List of New Jersey state legislatures
