= Brian P. Stack =

American politician (born 1966)

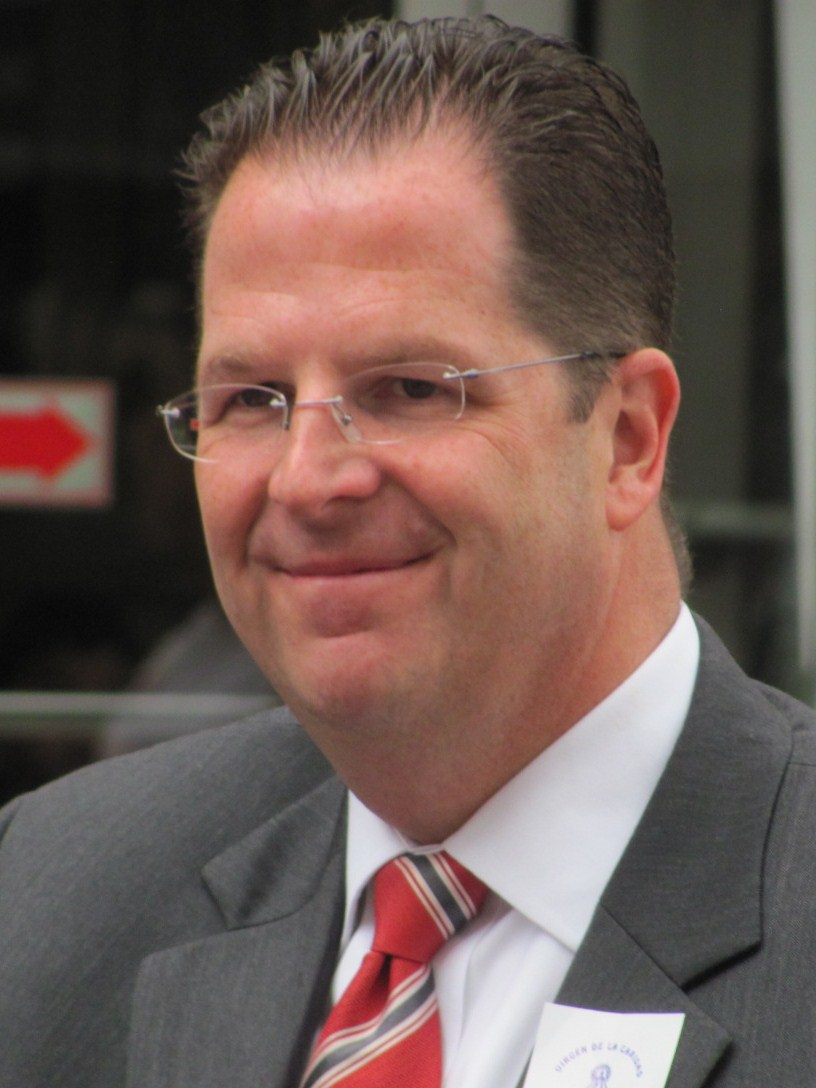
- Stack in September 2011

Member of the New Jersey Senate from the 33rd district
- Incumbent
- Assumed office January 8, 2008
- Preceded by: Bernard Kenny

Member of the New Jersey General Assembly from the 33rd district
- In office January 13, 2004 – January 8, 2008
- Preceded by: Rafael Fraguela
- Succeeded by: Ruben J. Ramos; Caridad Rodriguez

Mayor of Union City, New Jersey
- Incumbent
- Assumed office October 24, 2000
- Preceded by: Rudy Garcia

Personal details
- Born: May 16, 1966 (age 60) Jersey City, New Jersey, U.S.
- Party: Democratic
- Spouse: Katia (?–2011 div.)
- Education: Emerson High School; New Jersey City University
- Occupation: Mayor, Union City, New Jersey; State Senator
- Profession: Mayor, Union City
- Website: Legislative web page

Brian P. Stack (born May 16, 1966) is an American Democratic Party politician who represents the 33rd legislative district in the New Jersey Senate, where he serves as chairman of the Senate Judiciary Committee. He has also served as the mayor of Union City, New Jersey, since 2000. Prior to his election to the Senate, he served in the New Jersey General Assembly from 2004 to 2008.

Since 2007, Stack has been widely considered one of the most powerful people in Hudson County, the New Jersey Senate, and North Jersey generally.

== Early life ==
Brian P. Stack was born May 16, 1966, in Jersey City, New Jersey to Edward J. Stack, a PATH train conductor, and Margaret Stack, a building superintendent. He is of Irish descent. At a young age the Stack family moved to Union City, living in an apartment building at 518 9th Street, on the city's east side. They subsequently moved to 713 Palisade Avenue, where his mother worked for more than 20 years as the superintendent of that building and the other adjoining buildings. They later moved to 1104 Palisade Avenue, which remained their residence until Edward and Margaret's deaths in 2003 and 2015, respectively.

Stack credits his involvement in politics to his parents, who took him to political rallies in Union City. The Stacks were active in their community, as their apartment was a hospitable place that was "a stop for tenants and neighborhood people seeking assistance or advice." It was with his parents that Stack first began to participate in the practice of providing turkeys and holiday gifts to the needy, a practice that Stack would later institute as mayor. As Stack explained to a reporter when he was 19, "I remember when I was about 6 or 7 years old being at the Doric Temple polling place on election day just sitting and listening to the local politicians. I would probably say I dedicated my high school years to politics when I guess I should have been more into school activities. My classmates would call me 'mayor'. But I always believed it's vitally important for young people to get involved. We are the future."

Stack attended elementary school at St. Anthony of Padua School. He graduated from Emerson High School. He attended Jersey City State College, graduating with an M.A. in criminal justice.

== Career ==
=== Early career ===
Stack began volunteering on campaigns for William Musto as a young boy, and was present at age 16 at Musto's sentencing for racketeering and fraud. Musto's conviction shocked many in the community that believed he was wrongly accused. and Stack and his family corresponded with Musto while the latter served time in federal prison. Stack would later honor Musto by naming the William V. Musto Cultural Center after his former mentor. Stack also continued his involvement in politics through his criticism of the administration of Mayor Arthur Wichert.

Stack served as an aide in the 33rd Legislative District office from 1983 to 1984 and from 1986 to 1988. He also became a tenant advocate in 1985. In Union City, he served as an administrative assistant to the Commissioner of Parks and Public Property from 1986 to 1990, and as Deputy Director of Public Affairs from 1995 to 1996.

In 1996 Stack and his wife, Katia, established the Brian P. Stack Civic Association, through which they aided residents with issues such as housing, employment and immigration.

=== Mayor ===
Stack later became leader of a civic organization called Union City First, and for his public criticism of the administration of Mayor Rudy Garcia. Stack served as a Commissioner from 1997 to 1998, and was appointed to replace Garcia as mayor in October 2000, after Garcia resigned in the face of Stack's call for a recall election. Stack was elected unopposed to the Board of Commissioners in a special election in November 2001 and in May 2002 he and his ticket for the city's Board of Commissioners all ran unopposed. Stack simultaneously won the 7th District seat on the Hudson County Board of Chosen Freeholders, where he served from 2000 until his swearing into the Assembly in 2004. He relinquished his Freeholder position when he was sworn into the New Jersey State Assembly on January 13, 2004. Stack was reelected in 2005 and served in the Assembly until 2007.

Stack was reelected Mayor on May 9, 2006, winning 9,058 votes, 85% of the vote, compared to the 1,647 votes won by his opponent, Little Ferry Superintendent of Schools Frank Scarafile.

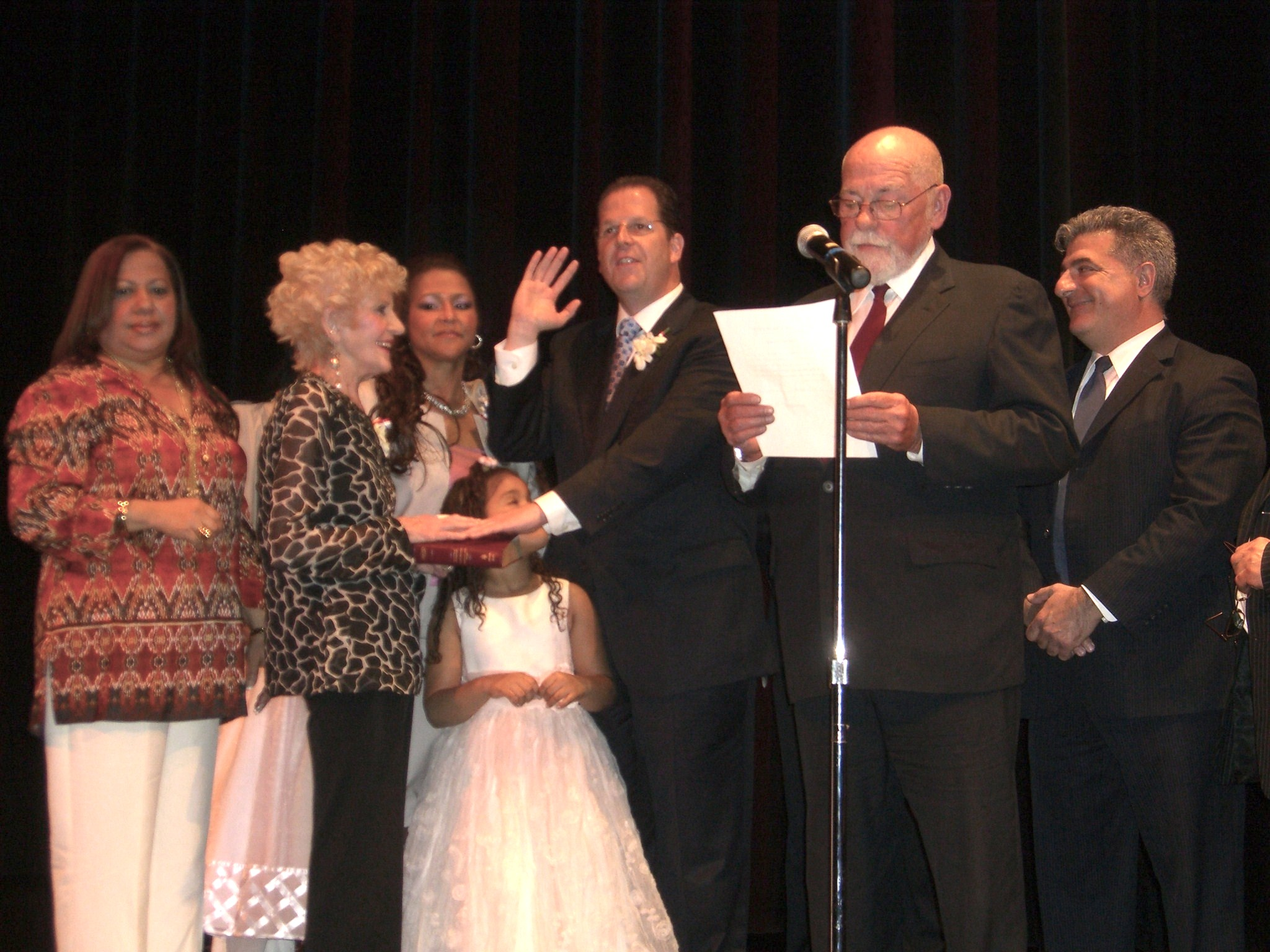
Stack being sworn in at Union City High School on May 18, 2010, after he was reelected. Holding the Bible is his mother, Margaret.

As mayor, Stack has focused on quality of life issues in Union City, in particular that which was affected by local bars violating liquor licenses for noise and selling alcohol to minors. His initiative to change the mandatory closing time for bars from 3 am to 2 am gained support from local police and city residents, despite opposition from local tavern owners.

In the Assembly, Stack represented the 33rd Legislative District together with Senator Bernard Kenny. He served on the Regulated Professions and Independent Authorities Committee as Vice Chair, and on the Transportation and Public Works Committee and the Joint Legislative Committee on Public School Funding Reform.

Stack and his commissioners were re-elected on May 11, 2010, in a landslide victory over Vision 4 Union City's slate of candidates, headed by recurring opponent Frank Scarafile. Stack won nearly 11,000 votes to Scarafile's nearly 1,200, with Stack's slate, which included Tilo Rivas, Lucio Fernandez, Maryury Martinetti and Christopher Irizarry, registering a combined total of between 85% and 90% of the vote. Stack and Scarafile, who criticized his opponent for his level of involvement and control in matters he contends are outside the legislative role of mayor, such as board appointments and school hiring, are embroiled in mutual lawsuits over negative campaign literature distributed by Scarafile in December 2009.

Stack has been noted to employ various methods to make himself available to Union City citizens, such as widely publicizing his cell phone number. Since 2000, Stack has spent a few days each quarter away from City Hall in a "mobile office" tent that is set up at various locations in Union City in order for people who do not have easy access to City Hall to see him. According to Stack, whereas he sees approximately 350 to 400 people a week at City Hall, his mobile office attracts upwards of 300 people a day. Stack, who employs a translator to communicate with Spanish-only speakers, is frequently asked by citizens for assistance in matters such as housing and employment. In July 2010, Stack increased his mobile office appearances to a monthly basis. Among the activities sponsored by his organization, the Brian Stack Civic Association, are annual delivery of free turkeys to the needy and free public Thanksgiving dinners.

In September 2010, as controversy arose over the Park51 project in Lower Manhattan, Feisal Rauf, the imam in charge of that project, came under scrutiny by Stack's administration over problems faced by a number of rental properties Rauf owns in Hudson County, including four in Union City, which residents complained had fallen into disrepair, with cited problems including lack of heat, rats, bed bug infestations, and inoperable fire alarms and sprinklers. Stack, who criticized Rauf as a "slumlord", announced the creation of a Quality of Life Task Force that would identify buildings in need of renovations, and filed suit against Rauf to have his properties placed into receivership. Some Union City residents, however, questioned why the timing of these actions against Rauf's properties did not become an issue in New York City and the national media, and why the long-standing problems faced by these properties were not addressed until the larger controversy over Park51 came to light, particularly given that Stack became mayor in 2000.

Stack and his four-member Board of Commissioners ran unopposed for reelection in the May 2014 election. They were reelected on May 13, with over 9,000 votes. Their new term began that July. They ran unopposed again in the May 2022 election. Stack garnered the most votes in the election with 9,607 or 21.83 percent of the vote, winning a sixth term.

On January 24, 2024, Stack served for the 23rd year and 91st day, making him the longest serving mayor of Union City. He broke the record held by Harry J. Thourot, who held the job from 1939 to 1962.

=== State legislator ===
Simultaneous with his work as Mayor of Union City, Stack holds a seat in the New Jersey Senate. This dual position, often called double dipping, is allowed under a grandfather clause in the state law enacted by the New Jersey Legislature and signed into law by Governor Jon Corzine in September 2007 that prevents dual-office-holding but allows those who had held both positions as of February 1, 2008, to retain both posts.

In 2007, Stack ran for the New Jersey Senate in the primary election for the Senate seat held by retiring State Senator Bernard Kenny, with a team of eight other 33rd District Assembly candidates vying for nine legislative seats, under the banner Democrats for Hudson County. Their main opposition was the Hudson County Democratic Organization (HCDO), which was headed by West New York Mayor and then-33rd Legislative District Assembly member Silverio Vega. On June 5, 2007, Stack won the primary, beating his opponents by a wide margin of 18,213 votes to Vega's 5,582, though only three of the candidates in Stack's column, including himself, were victorious. Stack and running mates Ruben Ramos and Caridad Rodriguez subsequently swept the state Senate and state Assembly in the November 6, 2007, general election. He has served in the Senate since January 8, 2008. Stack was reelected on November 8, 2011, garnering 18,244 votes over opponent Beth Hamburger's 2,815 votes.

Stack was re-elected to the state senate in 2021.

On February 24, 2022, Stack's colleague, North Bergen Mayor and State Senator Nicholas Sacco, announced that he would not run for re-election as state senator in 2023, following North Bergen's re-districting to the 33rd district, which placed Sacco in the same district as Stack. Sacco said he would support Stack, a move that InsiderNJ said could make Stack the most powerful state senator in New Jersey.

==== Committees ====
Committee assignments for the 2024—2025 Legislative Session are:

- Judiciary (as chair)
- Community and Urban Affairs (as vice-chair)

==== District 33 ====
Each of the 40 districts in the New Jersey Legislature has one representative in the New Jersey Senate and two members in the New Jersey General Assembly. The representatives from the 33rd District for the 2024—2025 Legislative Session are:

- Senator Brian Stack (D)
- Assemblywoman Julio Marenco (D)
- Assemblyman Gabe Rodriguez (D)

=== Hudson County Democratic Organization ===
After Vincent Prieto stepped down in 2018 as chair of the Hudson County Democratic Organization, historically one of the most powerful remaining political machines in the United States, Stack ran for Prieto's seat against Jersey City school board member Amy DeGise. Stack and Jersey City mayor Steve Fulop had previously been critical of her father, Hudson County Executive Tom DeGise.

The internal campaign for support from the county party committee members lasted months and was highly divisive. Fulop and Stack were joined by Hoboken mayor Ravi Bhalla. In a major upset, Stack lost the election on June 12 with 360 votes out of 812, with the chair going to Amy DeGise. Stack was reportedly "galled" by Fulop's inaction during the campaign and joined DeGise in criticism of Fulop shortly after the election.

=== Political positions ===
Despite support for the Federal Marriage Amendment by a number of Hudson County clergy leaders, Stack was an advocate of New Jersey's same-sex civil union law. The law, which was signed by governor Jon Corzine on December 21, 2006, and went into effect February 19, 2007, grants same-sex couples the same legal protections and benefits of marriage. Said Stack,

I'm 100 percent behind this. I perform around 200 to 300 marriages a year, and I'll be more than happy to perform civil unions. Whatever change are made, everything else will be exactly the same. We're just waiting to see what the wording will be.

Commenting on opposition to the bill, Stack explained,

The law is a result of the atmosphere in Trenton. Once the legislators saw the polling that people were generally supportive of civil unions statewide, Assembly Speaker Joseph Roberts really wanted to move the agenda forward quickly while the public support was there. I think over time, people will become even more accepting regarding the idea of marriage. I don't have children at this point in my life, but if I did have a child that was homosexual, I'd want them to have the same rights that everyone else has.

Stack was one of many statewide Democrats to endorse Republican Governor Chris Christie's bid for re-election in 2013.

Following the legalization of recreational marijuana in New Jersey in November 2020, Stack decided to prohibit retail establishments in Union City, in contrast to some other municipalities in Hudson County, citing Union City's population density as his rationale.

=== Controversies ===
==== Campaign controversy ====
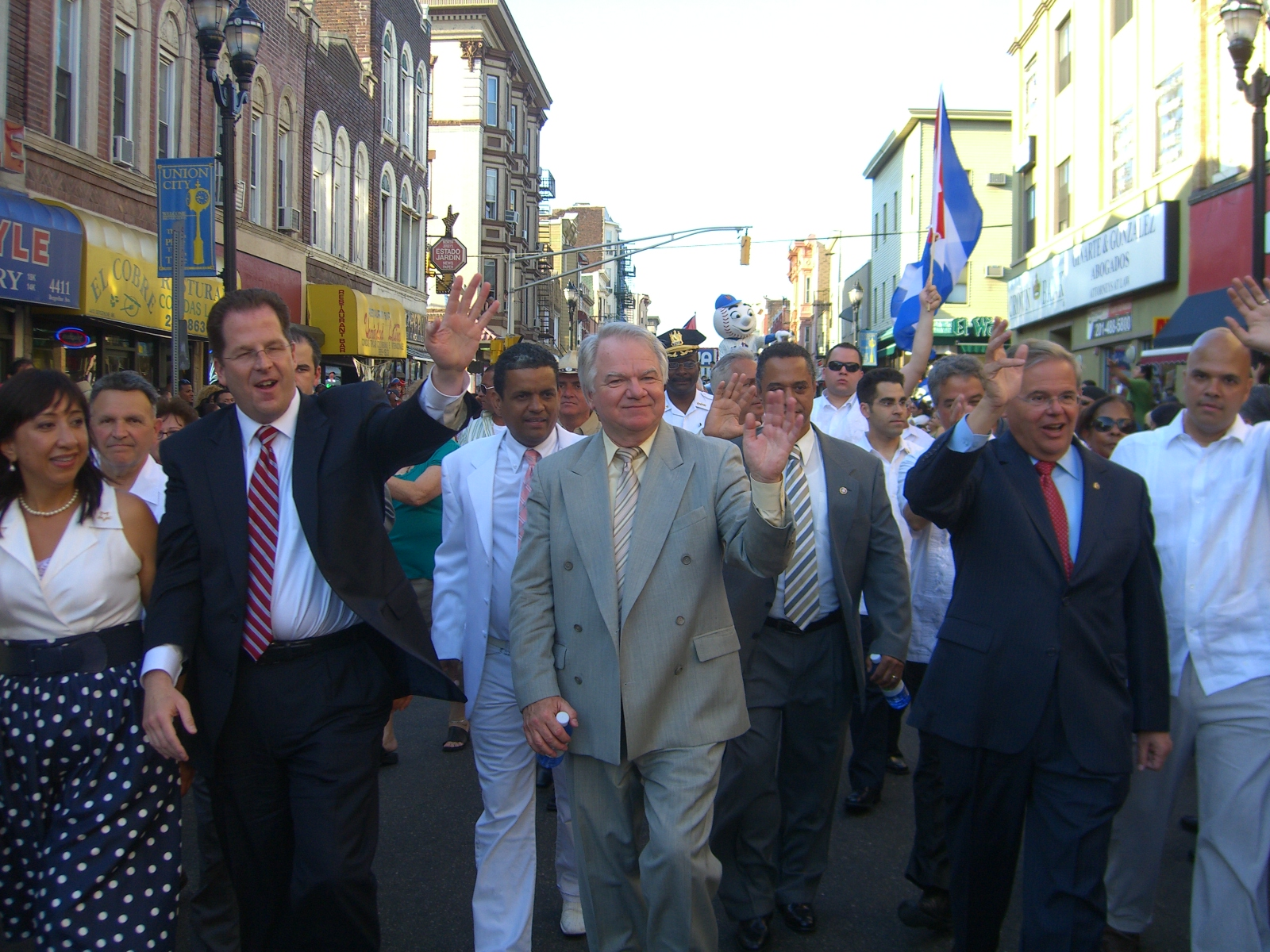
Stack and his staff marching in the North Hudson Cuban Day Parade with New Jersey Senator Bob Menendez (second from right), June 6, 2010

Stack and the Union City police were the subject of controversy in July 2005 when it was discovered that Stack had received two campaign contributions totalling $3,500 from Luisa Medrano, a tavern owner indicted on 31 counts of running an illegal immigrant smuggling ring out of her two Bergenline Avenue taverns, El Puerto de la Union II in Union City, and El Paisano Bar and Nightclub in Union City. Both taverns are no longer in operation. Medrano was accused of smuggling young women from Honduras, forcing them to work in bars for little money to pay off their smuggling debts, often incurring physical, emotional and sexual abuse during the operation. Stack responded by asserting that he does not accept contributions from bar owners and establishments, and explained that "[Medrano] used her name and address in Fairview. We make it a practice of not accepting donations from bar owners or establishments, and we do not accept cash." Stack pointed out that Medrano's establishments were not mentioned on the form with which she made the donations, and that he decided to donate the money to the Battered Women's Shelter of Hudson County once the donations were revealed, claiming that in addition to not being aware of the source of the money, he was unaware of the illicit activities going on in the bars. Stack also defended the Union City Police, who are assigned to watch the taverns for quality of life reasons, and who incurred criticism for their apparent ignorance of the goings-on in the taverns, on the same basis, arguing that they only patrolled the streets, but did not enter the taverns when they did so, and thus, could not see what occurred in them.

Some critics remained skeptical of Stack's position, such as then-Republican candidate for Assembly Richard Valdes, who said, "I challenge Assemblyman and Mayor Brian Stack to disclose the nature of his relationship and questionable campaign contributions from Medrano." Stack responded that he never met Medrano until a fundraiser held a year earlier, saying that Medrano was stopped at the door and was turned away from contributing to the event. Valdes also questioned the acceptance by Stack's campaign committee of $5,000 from Union City truck driver David Lopez, who had sold a vacant Union City lot to the Jersey City School Construction Corporation for $1.48 million, after Lopez had already gotten zoning approval and began advertisement for condominiums to be built on it. Stack also stated that he was unaware of that donation, that it was donated to the PERC Homeless Shelter, and that Valdes' comments were politically motivated.

==== Daycare funds subpoena ====
On March 26, 2007, Stack was one of three legislators subpoenaed regarding the disbursement of at least two $100,000 grants that went to the Union City Day Care, which is headed by Stack's estranged wife, Katia, and partially government funded. The subpoena was based on a complain by Republican activist Steve Lonegan, who filed 36 conflict of interest complaints against state legislators. A state ethics panel cleared Stack in late November 2009, ruling unanimously that he did not benefit from the grants, and that there was no conflict of interest.

==== Influence on local boards ====
In 2007, Stack was accused by developer Ralph Lieber of political favoritism in zoning and building approvals, alleging that Stack influenced the zoning board into voting against a residential building that Lieber wished to build on his property because he was not a political favorite of Stack's. Lieber sued the city for $4 million, later settling out of court for an undisclosed amount.

==== Private use of municipal vehicles ====
In January 2011, Stack was criticized in one of Arnold Díaz's "Shame Shame Shame" segments for WNYW Fox 5 for allowing the use of city-owned vehicles by his ex-wife, Katia Stack. Katia is the director of The Union City Day Care Program, a private organization with a $6 million budget, and was assigned by Mayor Stack a car owned by the Union City Police Department, as well as free gas and insurance. The Day Care Program also has at least one other public vehicle. In addition, Díaz reported that the day care center itself does not pay any rent for the city building in which it is housed. Stack stated that his administration did nothing wrong, and that the center's housing and vehicle status was initiated before he became mayor in 2000, but according to Díaz, WNYW did not receive requested documentation of this fact. Díaz states that the car Katia Stack had been using had been returned to the police department parking lot after their investigation began, and that she reimbursed the city for the cost of gas and insurance.

Stack again came under Díaz's scrutiny in February 2013 for the free rides that residents of the luxury high-rise Troy Towers in Union City are given to Hoboken Terminal, a service that began a few months prior, as indicated in a letter residents of that building received from Stack. The city van, which is normally used to transport seniors, picks up residents three times every weekday morning at the Troy Towers, despite the fact that a public bus stops there as well. Joseph Blaettler, a former Deputy Police Chief of Union City and Mayor Stack's former police liaison, who previously provided information to WNYW for the January 2011 report, criticized Stack for the rides, accusing Stack of using them to curry favor with Troy Towers voters. Emilio del Valle, a member of the advocacy group Union City Concerned Citizens, also criticized Stack for the taxpayer-funded service, which del Valle said was not needed. When interviewed, Stack stated that he was not attempting to buy the tower residents' votes, but provides the service because they are the largest taxpayers in the city, and that the van service is given to Union City citizens who request transportation to the terminal, doctor's appointments, etc., and that the citizenry is made aware of this. Díaz countered that the van driver's statements did not support this, nor did WNYW's surveillance of the van, which yielded no instances when it picked up at other locations, nor its interviews with low-income citizens who received no similar letter, and expressed ignorance of the service. According to Díaz, because Union City is classified as a fiscally distressed city, it receives $10 million a year in state aid, and Stack says that the van does not cost the city anything. However, Blaettler questions who pays for the cost of gas, insurance and the driver, who despite Stack's statement, says he is not the same driver who transports seniors during the van's normal operation. Díaz also points out that the service continued even after Hoboken Terminal was closed in October 2012 due to flooding caused by Hurricane Sandy, and placed Stack in the program's Hall of Shame for "abusing his power".

==== City lawsuit settlements ====
In September 2015, the city settled a lawsuit filed by former Newark police officer Moraima Medina, who stated that on July 19, 2011, she was wrongfully arrested because of her relationship with former police chief Joe Blaettler, who had an adversarial relationship with both Stack and Union City Police Chief Charles Everett. In the lawsuit, which Medina filed in July 2014, she stated that she was stopped while exiting the Union City City Hall parking garage, and told by Everett, "Tell us you work for Joe [Blaettler] and we will let you go." She refused, she was arrested for driving with a suspended license, placed in a jail cell, her car was impounded and searched, and she was allegedly told by Police Chief Charles Everett to "Never go to Union City again!" In addition, criminal complaints were filed against her for of stalking, owning an uninsured vehicle, blocking a crosswalk. The charges were all ultimately dismissed on double jeopardy grounds. The lawsuit was settled for $67,000, with the city admitting no wrongdoing.

In December 2016, the city settled a lawsuit with former U.S. Immigration and Customs Enforcement (ICE) agent Ricky Patel, who accused Stack of using government resources to harass him. According to Patel's November 2014 lawsuit, about two weeks after the FBI raided the Union City Community Development Agency, he found a note on his vehicle informing him that the car was "part of an ongoing investigation", and noticed his apartment was being surveilled by a woman revealed to be Stack's girlfriend. When Patel asked the woman why she was parked in front of his apartment, she called Stack, who then arrived and as Patel described, exclaimed, "I am the f**king Mayor! This is my city! F**k the feds!" Patel was then escorted to police headquarters, where a police lieutenant told her that she was concerned federal agents were “conducting an unsanctioned investigation against our mayor." The Union City insurance carrier settled the lawsuit for $100,000, with neither the city nor its officials admitting any wrongdoing.

== Personal life ==
Stack's father Edward died on November 16, 2003. His mother, Margaret, died on May 14, 2015, at the age of 83, following a long illness.

Stack was previously married to Katia Stack, with whom Stack established the Brian P. Stack Civic Association in 1996. Katia was the director of Revenue and Finance for the city of Hoboken until August 2002, when she resigned to become Executive Director of Union City's daycare program. The Stacks were estranged by 2007, and had divorced by 2011.

== Election history ==
33rd Legislative District General Election, 2023
Party	Candidate	Votes	%
Democratic	Brian P. Stack	27,262	97.1
Socialist Workers	Joanne Kuniansky	821	2.9
Total votes		28,083	100.0
Democratic hold			

33rd Legislative District general election, 2021
Party	Candidate	Votes	%
Democratic	Brian P. Stack (incumbent)	37,059	85.14
Republican	Agha Khan	6,466	14.86
Total votes		43,525	100.0
Democratic hold			

33rd Legislative District general election, 2017
Party	Candidate	Votes	%	±%
Democratic	Brian P. Stack (incumbent)	36,594	88.2	▲7.5
Republican	Beth Hamburger	4,887	11.8	▼7.5
Total votes		41,481	100.0	
Democratic hold				

New Jersey State Senate elections, 2013
Party	Candidate	Votes	%
Democratic	Brian P. Stack (incumbent)	26,980	80.7
Republican	James Sanford	6,460	19.3
Democratic hold			

New Jersey State Senate elections, 2011
Party	Candidate	Votes	%
Democratic	Brian P. Stack (incumbent)	20,223	86.6
Republican	Beth Hamburger	3,136	13.4
Democratic hold			

New Jersey State Senate elections, 2007
Party	Candidate	Votes	%
Democratic	Brian P. Stack	20,313	100.0
Democratic hold			

New Jersey Senate
Preceded by Bernard Kenny	Member of the New Jersey Senate for the 33rd District; January 8, 2008 – present	Succeeded by Incumbent
New Jersey General Assembly
Preceded by Rafael Fraguela	Member of the New Jersey General Assembly for the 33rd District; January 13, 2004 – January 8, 2008; With: Albio Sires, Silverio Vega	Succeeded by Ruben J. Ramos; Caridad Rodriguez
Political offices
Preceded by Rudy Garcia	Mayor of Union City, New Jersey; October 2000 – present	Succeeded by Incumbent
