= Avi Schnall =

American politician (born 1984)

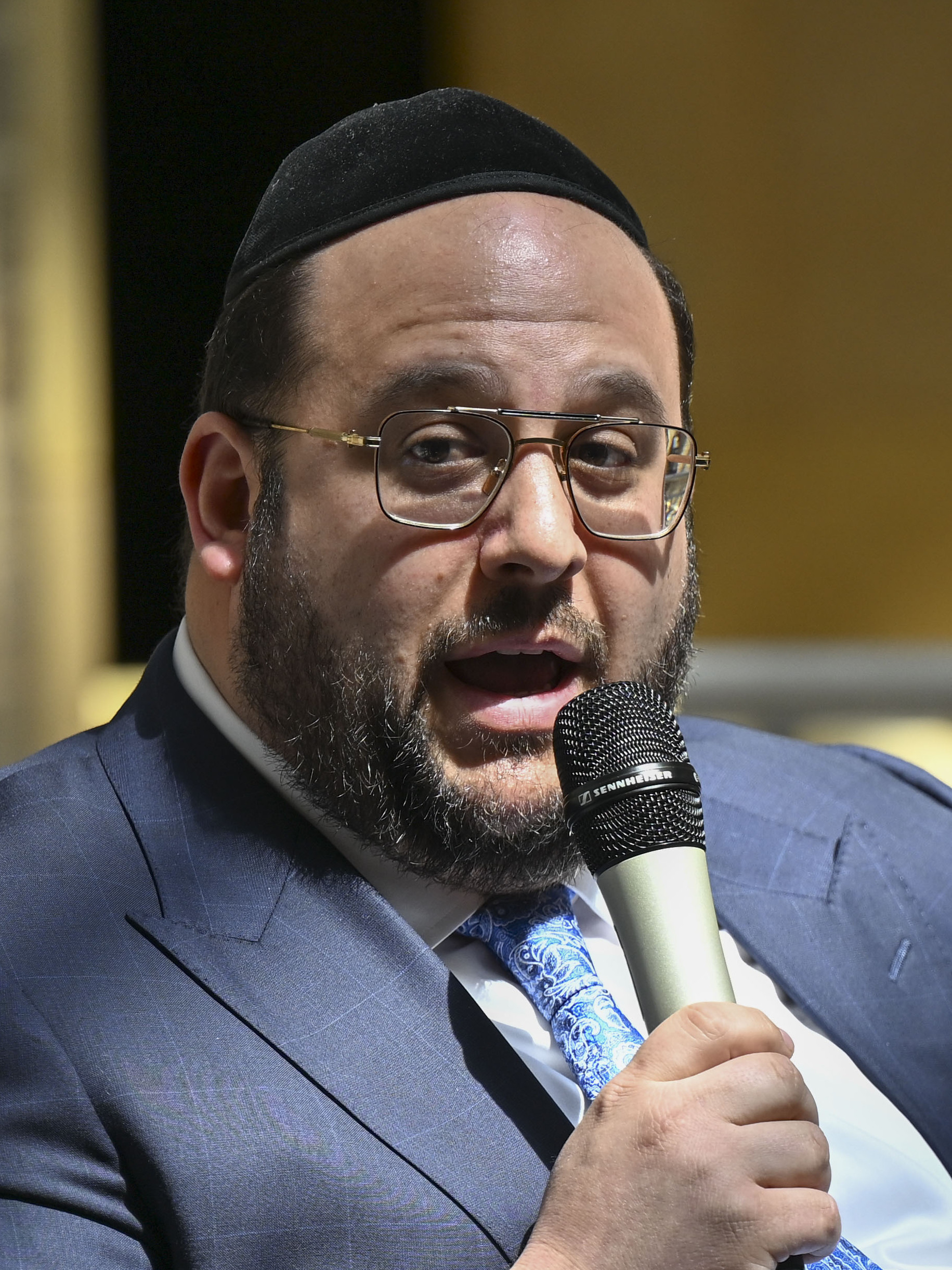

Member of the New Jersey General Assembly from the 30th district
- Incumbent
- Assumed office January 9, 2024 Serving with Sean T. Kean
- Preceded by: Ned Thomson

Personal details
- Born: July 3, 1984 (age 42)
- Party: Democratic (2022–present)
- Other political affiliations: Republican (before 2022)
- Education: Talmudical Yeshiva of Philadelphia; Beth Medrash Govoha

Alexander "Avi" Schnall (born July 3, 1984) is an American Democratic Party politician, who has represented the 30th legislative district in the New Jersey General Assembly since January 2024.

A Brooklyn native, Schnall moved to Lakewood Township, New Jersey, to study at Beth Medrash Govoha.

In March 2026, he was named as Chief Operating Officer of Agudath Israel of America, responsible for the organization's day-to-day functions.

== New Jersey General Assembly ==
In the 2023 New Jersey General Assembly election, incumbent Republican Sean T. Kean won re-election, while Schnall won the second seat, more than 10,000 votes ahead of Republican incumbent Ned Thomson, while Schnall's Democratic running mate Salvatore "Sal" Frascino came in a distant fourth. Schnall's victory was described as "a major upset" in a district that had traditionally been solidly Republican, reflecting the growing Orthodox Jewish community in Lakewood Township and surrounding communities. Schnall was one of 27 members elected for the first time to serve in the General Assembly in 2024, more than one-third of the 80 seats. Schnall was re-elected to the Assembly in 2025.

=== Committees ===
Committee assignments for the 2026–2027 Legislative Session are:

- Oversight, Reform and Federal Relations (as chair)
- Budget
- Financial Institutions and Insurance

=== District 30 ===
Each of the 40 districts in the New Jersey Legislature has one representative in the New Jersey Senate and two members in the New Jersey General Assembly. The representatives from the 30th District for the 2026–2027 Legislative Session are:

- Senator Robert Singer (R)
- Assemblyman Sean T. Kean (R)
- Assemblyman Avi Schnall (D)

== Electoral history ==
30th Legislative District General Election, 2023
Party	Candidate	Votes	%
Republican	Sean T. Kean (incumbent)	37,450	39.9
Democratic	Avi Schnall	29,482	31.4
Republican	Edward H. Thomson (incumbent)	18,076	19.3
Democratic	Salvatore Frascino	8,868	9.4
Total votes		93,876	100.0
Republican hold			
Democratic gain from Republican			
