= List of people from Hoboken, New Jersey =

This is a list of notable people of Hoboken, New Jersey. (B) denotes that the person was born there.

- Nick Acocella (1943–2020), political journalist and author
- Howard Aiken (1900–1973), pioneer in computing (B)
- Richard Barone, musician; former frontman for Hoboken pop group The Bongos
- David Berman (1967–2019), musician, singer-songwriter and poet who founded the indie rock band Silver Jews
- William Beutenmuller (1864–1934), entomologist who was curator of entomology at the American Museum of Natural History (B)
- Bob Borden (born 1969), writer for Late Show with David Letterman
- Joanne Borgella (1982–2014), Miss F.A.T 2005 on Mo'Nique's Fat Chance and a contestant on American Idol, Season 7
- Andre W. Brewster (1862–1942), Major General U.S. Army, recipient Medal of Honor (B)
- Marques Brownlee (born 1993), technology reviewer, known for his YouTube channel, MKBHD
- Jewett Campbell (1912–1999) painter, and teacher (B)
- Michael Chang (born 1972), professional tennis player, French Open champion (B)
- Irwin Chusid (born 1951), radio personality, author, historian
- Vincent Cooke, S.J. (1936–2017), Jesuit priest and academic, President of Canisius College (1993–2010) (B)
- Vincent Copeland (1915–1993), actor, labor official, writer and political activist
- Jon Corzine (born 1947), Governor of New Jersey
- L. Adele Cuinet (1854/55-1933), dental surgeon
- Ronald Dario (1937–2004), politician who represented the 33rd Legislative District in the New Jersey General Assembly from 1984 to 1986
- Willem de Kooning (1904–1997), 20th-century painter
- Anthony DePalma (born 1952), author, journalist and educator who was a foreign correspondent and reporter for The New York Times
- Louise DeSalvo (1942–2018), writer, editor, professor, and lecturer who was a renowned Virginia Woolf scholar
- Paul Aaron Langevin Doty (1869–1938), mechanical engineer who served as the 53rd president of the American Society of Mechanical Engineers(B)
- Mark D'Onofrio (born 1969), NFL player(B)
- Albert J. Dunlap (1937–2019), business executive, known for company downsizing, earning him the nickname "Chainsaw Al"
- John J. Eagan (1872–1956), United States Representative from New Jersey (B)
- Dawn Eden, author, journalist, rock historian
- Martha Entenmann (1906–1996), businesswoman known for her role in developing Entenmann's bakery into one of the largest baked-goods companies in the United States (B)
- Sam Esmail (born 1977), television producer known for Mr. Robot and Homecoming
- Luke Faust (born 1936), musician
- Julio Fernández (born 1954), guitarist and composer best known as the current and longtime guitarist for the jazz-fusion band Spyro Gyra
- Michele Fitzgerald (born 1990), winner of Survivor: Kaôh Rōng, second runner-up on Survivor: Winners at War, and contestant on MTV's The Challenge
- Vicky Flynn (born 1972), lawyer and politician who has represented the 13th Legislative District in the New Jersey General Assembly since 2002 (B)
- Cristina Fontanelli, opera singer
- Ken Freedman (born 1959), radio executive and personality at WFMU
- Bill Frisell (born 1951), avant-garde musician and composer
- Thomas Gallo (1914–1994), politician who served 11 years in the New Jersey General Assembly, including five full terms representing the 33rd Legislative District (B)
- Kyla Garcia, stage, film, and television actress and audiobook narrator (B)
- Dorothy Gibson (1889–1946), pioneering silent film actress; Titanic survivor (B)
- John Grefe (1947–2013), International Master of chess(B)
- Hetty Green (1834–1916), businesswoman/entrepreneur
- Pia Guerra (born 1972), comic book artist and cartoonist, who is co-creator of Y The Last Man, cartoonist for The New Yorker and The Nib (B)
- Reema Harrysingh-Carmona (born 1970), former First Lady of Trinidad and Tobago (B)
- Nat Hickey (born 1902), oldest person to play an NBA game (B)
- Chaim Hirschensohn (1857–1935), Chief Rabbi of Hoboken and early Zionist leader
- Juliet Huddy (born 1969), Fox News personality
- August William Hutaf (1879–1942), illustrator, commercial artist, and advertising executive (B)
- Anthony Impreveduto (1948–2009), member of the New Jersey General Assembly 1987–2004
- Kate Jacobs (born 1959), singer-songwriter who released her fifth album Home Game in 2011
- Mike Jerrick (born 1954), host of the morning television series Fox & Friends
- Carroll N. Jones III (1944–2017), artist in the style of American realism
- Alfred Kinsey (1894–1956), psychologist who studied sexual behavior (B)
- Jay I. Kislak (1922–2018), businessman, philanthropist, bibliophile, and aviator (B)
- Mathias Kiwanuka (born 1983), linebacker who played for the New York Giants
- Alfred L. Kroeber (1876–1960), anthropologist; first professor appointed to the Department of Anthropology at the University of California, Berkeley; known for his association with the Native American man Ishi (B)
- Johnny Kucks (1933–2013), pitcher who won the World Series twice with the New York Yankees (B)
- Artie Lange (born 1967), comedian, radio personality on The Howard Stern Show
- Dorothea Lange (1895–1965), photographer during the Great Depression for the FSA, and of the Japanese internment program
- Jack Lazorko (born 1956), former pitcher for the Milwaukee Brewers, Seattle Mariners, and California Angels
- Caroline Leavitt (born 1952), author
- David Levithan (born 1972), young adult fiction author and editor
- Mark Leyner (born 1956), post-modern author
- G. Gordon Liddy (1930–2021), Watergate conspirator; radio talk show host (B)
- William Lowell Sr. (1863–1954), dentist and an inventor of a wooden golf tee patented in 1921 (B)
- Janet Lupo (1950–2017), Playboy Playmate for November 1975 (B)
- Stephen Malkmus (born 1966), musician best known as the primary songwriter, lead singer and guitarist of the indie rock band Pavement
- Eli Manning (born 1981), Super Bowl champion quarterback for the New York Giants
- Dennis McCort (born 1941), literary scholar, translator and novelist
- Patrick McDonnell (born 1956), cartoonist, author and playwright who is the creator of the syndicated daily comic strip Mutts
- Dorothy Blackwell McNeil (born 1940s), African-American nightclub owner
- Bob Menendez (born 1954), United States Senator who served as mayor of Union City
- Kawika Mitchell (born 1979), linebacker who played for the New York Giants
- Natalie Morales (born 1972), television personality, NBC News and The Today Show
- Bob Nastanovich (born 1967), musician and member of the indie rock band Pavement
- Keturah Orji (born 1996), track and field athlete specializing in the triple jump who was selected as part of the U.S. team at the 2016 Summer Olympics (B)
- Jesse Palmer (born 1978), NFL quarterback featured on TV show The Bachelor
- Joe Pantoliano (born 1951), actor (B)
- Tom Pelphrey (born 1982), actor, won an Emmy for his role on Guiding Light
- Maria Pepe (born 1960), first girl to play Little League baseball (B)
- Daniel Pinkwater (born 1941), National Public Radio commentator; author
- Anna Quindlen (born 1952), columnist, novelist
- James Rado (1932–2022), co-creator of the Broadway Musical Hair
- Gerome Ragni (1935–1991), co-creator of the Broadway Musical Hair
- Robert Ranieri (born 1929), politician who represented the 33rd legislative district in the New Jersey General Assembly (B)
- Alex Rodriguez (born 1975), professional baseball player for the New York Yankees
- William Roerick (1912–1995), actor who appeared on Guiding Light (B)
- Frederick H. Rohr (1896–1965), entrepreneur and engineer who founded Rohr Aircraft (B)
- Carlos Saldanha (born 1965), director of animated films, including the Ice Age films and Rio
- Robert Charles Sands (1799–1832), writer
- David Saperstein (1901–1990), lawyer and government regulator who helped create the Securities and Exchange Commission (B)
- John Sayles (born 1950), filmmaker and author
- Dave Schramm, musician who played with Yo La Tengo and the Schramms
- Charles Schreyvogel (1861–1912), painter of Western subject matter in the days of the disappearing frontier
- Steve Sesnick (1941–2022), rock club and rock band manager (B)
- Steve Shelley (born 1963), drummer for rock band Sonic Youth
- Frank Sinatra (1915–1998), singer and actor; winner of Academy Award and Grammy Lifetime Achievement Award; namesake of Hoboken's Frank Sinatra Park and Sinatra Drive (B)
- Jack Stephans (1939–2020), American football coach who was head coach at Jersey City State College, William Paterson University and Fordham University (B)
- Edwin Augustus Stevens (1795–1868), engineer, inventor and entrepreneur
- Colonel John Stevens (1749–1838), inventor; founder of Hoboken
- John Cox Stevens (1785–1857), first Commodore of the New York Yacht Club
- Robert L. Stevens (1787–1856), inventor, who was the son of Colonel John Stevens (B)
- Alfred Stieglitz (1864–1946), leading figure of 19th and early 20th-century American photography (B)
- Joe Sulaitis (1921–1980), running back for the New York Giants of the NFL, 1943–1953
- Jeff Tamarkin, editor, author and historian
- Tyshawn Taylor (born 1990), basketball player with the Brooklyn Nets
- Rosemarie Totaro (1933–2018), politician who served two separate stints in the New Jersey General Assembly representing the 23rd Legislative District (B)
- Buddy Valastro (born 1977), baker and television personality, known for Cake Boss (B)
- Philip A. White (1823–1891), pharmacist, aristocrat, advocate and school board member
- Blind Tom Wiggins (1849–1908), ex-slave; piano prodigy
- Frank Winters (born 1964), NFL player for four teams
- Edwin R. V. Wright (1812–1871), represented New Jersey's 5th congressional district, 1865–1867
- Pia Zadora (born 1954), singer and actress (B)
