= Carmelo Garcia =

American politician (born 1975)

Carmelo G. Garcia
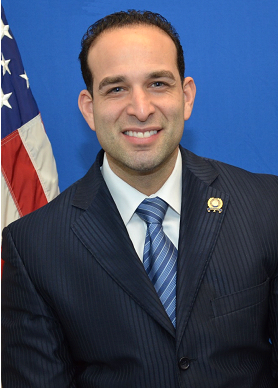

Member of the New Jersey General Assembly from the 33rd district
- In office January 14, 2014 – January 12, 2016 Serving with Raj Mukherji
- Preceded by: Sean Connors; Ruben Ramos
- Succeeded by: Annette Chaparro

Personal details
- Born: April 25, 1975 (age 51) Hoboken, New Jersey
- Party: Democratic
- Occupation: Politician, executive business coach, speaker, and author

Carmelo G. Garcia (born April 25, 1975) is an American former politician from the state of New Jersey. He represented the 33rd Legislative District in the New Jersey General Assembly as part of the Democratic Party for one two-year term. In October 2024 he pleaded guilty to federal bribery, fraud and conspiracy charges related to his time as an official working for the city of Newark and in June 2026 was sentenced to prison.

== Early life and education ==
Garcia grew up in Hoboken, New Jersey and graduated from Hoboken High School. He graduated from Seton Hall University, where he received a BS in Criminal Justice and Sociology, and from Stevens Institute of Technology, where he earned a Master of Science in Information Systems. Garcia was one of 50 people selected in 2012 to participate in NeighborWorks Achieving Excellence Program, which focuses on affordable housing and includes a three-week session at Harvard University.

== Career ==
In 1998 he was named as an aide, with an annual salary of $6,000, to Hudson County Freeholder Maurice Fitzgibbons. Garcia was first elected to the Hoboken Board of Education in 2002 at age 26, won re-election three times and served as president and vice president of the board. In 2006 he was reprimanded by the New Jersey School Ethics Commission for his August 2005 votes to hire his brother as a custodian and to award a $60,000 contract to Fitzgibbons' public relations firm. He resigned from the school board in 2013 when he won election to the state assembly.

In 2001, Mayor Dave Roberts appointed Garcia as Hoboken's first minority Director of Human Services. He left the position in 2007 when he accepted a job as assistant director of the federally funded Hoboken Housing Authority (HHA); he was also the first Latino to hold this role. Garcia was terminated as executive director of the HHA in 2014 and subsequently sued the housing board, claiming Mayor Dawn Zimmer was engaging in "ethnic cleansing" by removing minorities from positions of power. Garcia sued the HHA, first in 2013, then again in 2014 when the first suit was denied with prejudice. The amended suit was dismissed in January 2016 and he filed again in May 2016; this time, the HHA counter-sued him. In late 2017, the lawsuit was settled and Garcia was awarded $700,000.

In 2013, prior to the termination of his HHA contract, Garcia ran for the General Assembly in the June Democratic primary election on a ticket with State Senator Brian P. Stack and Raj Mukherji. In April, however, following a lawsuit filed by several local residents, Judge Peter Bariso ruled that since the HHA received federal subsidies, Garcia was subject to the Hatch Act of 1939, which bans those whose salary is paid primarily through federal funds from running in partisan elections. Shortly after, an appellate court overturned Judge Bariso's decision based on a change in Hatch Act regulations and Garcia was deemed eligible to run for office. Stack, Mukherji, and Garcia swept the November general election and assumed office. Garcia, along with other Democrats on his 2013 legislative ticket, endorsed Republican Chris Christie in his successful bid for re-election as Governor of New Jersey that year.

As part of the Assembly, he worked on the Financial Institutions and Insurance Committee, the Human Services Committee and the Transportation and Independent Authorities Committee. During this time, he sponsored or co-sponsored 300 bills and his office authored at least six pieces of legislature, one of which champions for better rights for people living with Alzheimer's disease. After 14 months in office, Garcia lost the backing of the powerful Hudson County Democratic Organization, which chose Annette Chaparro, a Zimmer-approved candidate, to run for his seat in the November 2015 election.

In August 2015, he began campaigning against another Zimmer-approved candidate, Jennifer Giattino, for a seat on the Hoboken City Council. In November, Giattino beat Garcia by more than 200 votes.

In early 2015, Garcia began working for the nonprofit Newark Community Economic Development Corporation (NCEDC), now known as Invest Newark. He was executive vice president and chief real estate officer until April 2018.

From 2017 to 2018, he worked as the deputy mayor and acting director of Newark's Department of Economic and Housing Development (DEHD) before being replaced by John Palmieri. He was moved into the role of chief of development, which he held until April 2019. Beginning about June 2017, he also began working as the executive director of the federally funded Irvington Housing Authority in Irvington, New Jersey. As of 2021, he is no longer listed as executive director of the Irvington Housing Authority.

After leaving his Newark government positions about April 2019, he became the manager of a consulting firm and worked with his daughter, Leah Garcia, on marketing a life coaching app.

From at least 2017 through April 2019, while serving as Deputy Mayor of Newark, and prior to that, as an executive officer of the NCEDC, the Department of Justice charged in October 2021 that Garcia "sought and received significant monetary payments and other benefits from Frank Valvano, Jr., Irwin Sablosky, and others in exchange for Garcia’s use of his official positions and influence within the City of Newark and the NCEDC to advance real estate development matters." Garcia pleaded guilty to the charges in June 2024.

On June 4, 2026, Carmelo was sentenced to one year and one day in federal custody, followed by a three-year term of supervised release, on charges stemming from accepting almost $160,000 in bribes. As part of his guilty plea, he agreed to criminal forfeiture of the $25,000 corrupt cash payment and administrative/civil forfeiture of the jewelry that he obtained from the scheme.

== Personal life ==
Garcia is married to Margarita and has four children.

In 2011, the Puerto Rican Culture Committee honored him with an Outstanding Achievement Award for his advocacy work and for being a role model for Hoboken youth.

He has served as a board member for the Act Now Foundation for Alzheimer's Disease and educational group African Views and is the founder of the Save the Youth Academy, an after-school hip-hop dance program at Hoboken High School aimed at at-risk youth.

New Jersey General Assembly
Preceded by Sean Connors; Ruben Ramos	Member of the New Jersey General Assembly from the 33rd district January 14, 2014–January 12, 2016; Served alongside: Raj Mukherji	Succeeded by Annette Chaparro
