= Rafael Fraguela =

American politician (born 1955)

Member of the New Jersey General Assembly from the 33rd district
- In office January 8, 2002 – January 13, 2004 Serving with Albio Sires
- Preceded by: Rudy Garcia
- Succeeded by: Brian P. Stack

Personal details
- Born: June 7, 1955 (age 71)
- Party: Democratic; Republican (Apr.–Dec. 2003)

Rafael Fraguela (born June 7, 1955) is an American politician who was elected to the New Jersey General Assembly in 2001 as a Democrat, where he represented the 33rd Legislative District. He then re-registered with the Republican Party and ran unsuccessfully for the New Jersey Senate after the Democrats would not support his candidacy for a second term in the Assembly.

== Early life and career ==
Born in Cuba, Fraguela emigrated to the United States with his family. Settling in Union City, he graduated in 1974 from Union Hill High School.

Fraguela received his bachelor's degree in social studies from Montclair State College and his master's degree in secondary education/administration supervision from Seton Hall University. He worked as a school principal for the Passaic Board of Education, and as president of the Union City Board of Education from 1988 to 1992.

== New Jersey Commissioner ==
Fraguela's first political appointment was as a commissioner on the Hudson County Board of Taxation, from 1990 to 1993. He joined the Union City, New Jersey Board of Commissioners in 1992. In 2000, Fraguela opposed an effort by then-mayor Rudy Garcia to sell Roosevelt Stadium to the Union City Board of Education for $3.5 million as part of an effort to fill a $5 million deficit in the city's budget. Fraguela called the plan "voodoo economics" and supported an effort to have Garcia removed by a recall election. With Rudy Garcia losing support in Union City, Brian P. Stack announced in October 2000 that he would support Fraguela in the Democratic primary to fill the seat in the Assembly that Garcia had been occupying

Together with running mate Albio Sires, Fraguela won election to the Assembly as a Democrat in the November 2001 general election, defeating Republicans Sergio Alonso and Helen Pinoargotty.

Assemblymember Fraguela was knocked off the ballot in 2003 by the Hudson County Democratic Party and chose to run for the Senate as a Republican against Bernard Kenny. Fraguela insisted that the Democrats "have been putting aside all the Hispanic Democratic candidates", while "The GOP has had open arms to the Hispanic community". The Democrats gave the ballot spot for the Assembly to Brian P. Stack. Kenny won the general election in November 2003 with an overwhelming majority in the heavily Democratic district, taking 80.9% of the vote to Fraguela's 19.1%

== Party switch ==
Fraguela had been voting with Republicans in the Assembly, but switched back to vote in favor of Jim McGreevey's stem cell research bill, calling his vote "the right thing to do", saying that "I decided to cast my vote for humanity" after listening to the arguments from both sides. He was ejected from the Republican caucus on December 15, 2003 after his vote provided the margin of victory for the stem cell bill. He rejoined the Democratic party on December 18, 2003.
