= Thomas Gallo =

Thomas Gallo may refer to:

- Thomas Gallo (politician) (1914–1994), American politician
- Thomas Gallo (rugby union) (born 1999), Argentine rugby union player
