= Louis Romano =

American politician

Louis A. Romano

Member of the New Jersey General Assembly from the 33rd district
- In office January 14, 1992 – January 11, 2000 Serving with Bernard Kenny, Rudy Garcia
- Preceded by: Bob Menendez
- Succeeded by: Albio Sires

Personal details
- Born: August 20, 1930 Jersey City, New Jersey
- Died: November 30, 2000 (aged 70) Hackensack, New Jersey
- Party: Democratic
- Education: Fordham University (BS); Seton Hall University (MA); New York University (EdD)
- Occupation: Legislator

Louis A. Romano (August 20, 1930 - November 29, 2000) was an American Democratic Party politician who served four terms in the New Jersey General Assembly from 1992 to 2000, where he represented the 33rd Legislative District.

== Early life ==
Born in Jersey City, New Jersey, Romano was raised in West New York, New Jersey, where he attended Memorial High School.

Romano earned his undergraduate degree from Fordham University, with a major in Social Studies, earned a Master of Arts from Seton Hall University in Professional Education and was awarded a Doctor of Education from New York University. He served in the United States Army from 1951 to 1953, attaining the rank of corporal. A lifelong resident of West New York, Romano was employed by the West New York School District and taught at Memorial High School, his alma mater.

== Assemblyman ==
Romano was first elected to the General Assembly in 1991, together with Bernard Kenny of Jersey City, defeating Republican candidates Antonio Miguelez and A. Lazaro Guas. Romano won re-election to the Assembly three times with Rudy Garcia of Union City as his running mate, soundly defeating Republicans Mary C. Gaspa and Armando C. Hernandez in 1993, Raphael S. Alvarez and Joseph Liuzzi in 1995, and Michael Alvarez and Freddy Gomez in 1997. He served in the Assembly on the Appropriations Committee and the Joint Budget Oversight Committee.

In the June 1999 primaries, the Hudson County Democratic Party organization was looking for "new blood" and chose to give its official support to West New York mayor Albio Sires, as well as Romano's fellow Assemblymember Rudy Garcia. Despite losing the endorsement, Romano ran in the Democratic primary and lost, making him the only one of the 80 incumbents in the Assembly to lose their primary bid.

== Personal life ==
Romano died of lung cancer at the age of 70 on November 29, 2000, at Hackensack University Medical Center. He had married Patricia DeFino days before his death.
