= Raj Mukherji =

American politician (born 1984)

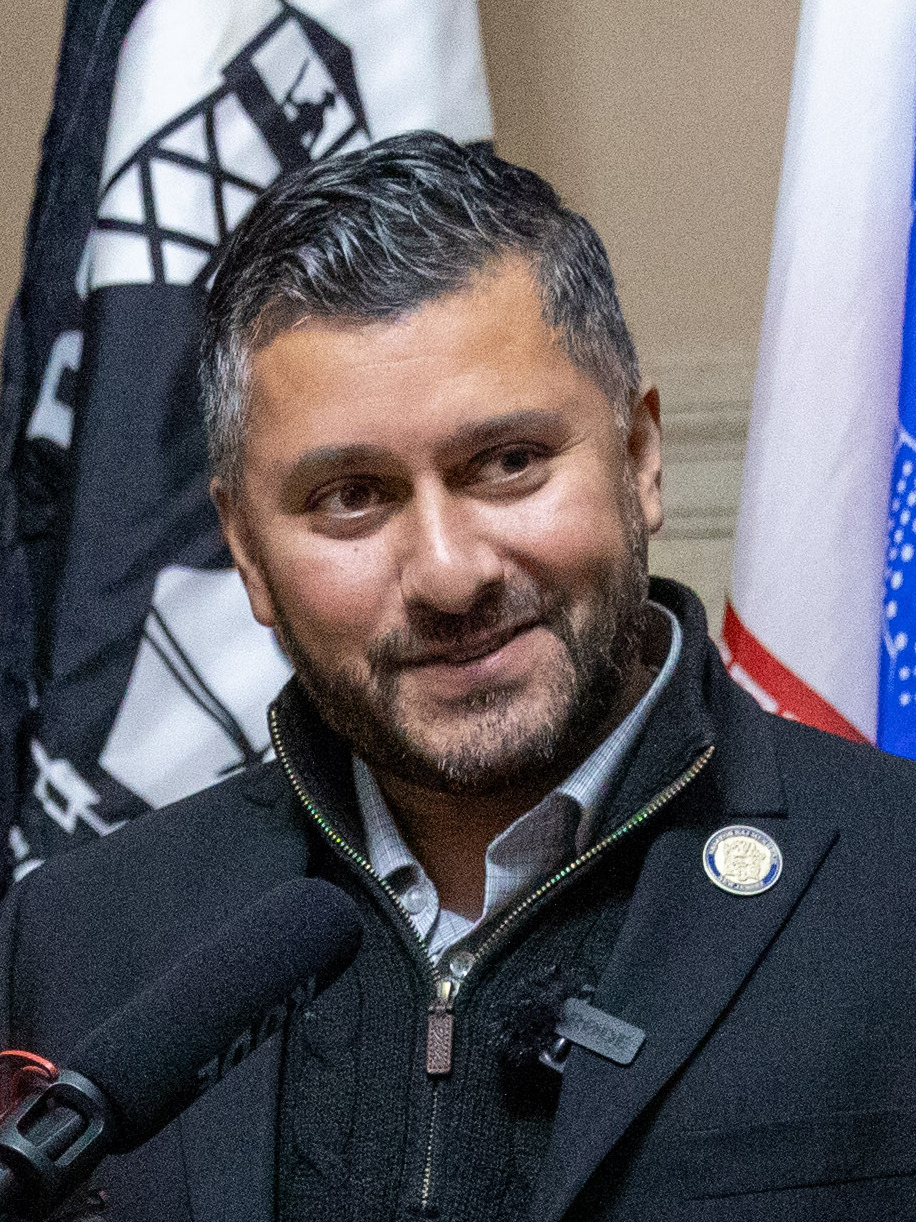
- Mukherji in 2025

Member of the New Jersey Senate from the 32nd district
- Incumbent
- Assumed office January 9, 2024
- Preceded by: Nicholas Sacco

Member of the New Jersey General Assembly from the 33rd district
- In office January 14, 2014 – January 9, 2024
- Preceded by: Sean Connors; Ruben J. Ramos
- Succeeded by: John Allen; Jessica Ramirez

Deputy Mayor of Jersey City, New Jersey
- In office March 2, 2012 – June 30, 2013
- Preceded by: Leona Beldini
- Succeeded by: John Thieroff

Commissioner & Chairman, Jersey City Housing Authority
- In office October 22, 2008 – January 8, 2024
- Preceded by: Lori Serrano
- Succeeded by: Jeffrey Dublin

Personal details
- Born: July 15, 1984 (age 42) Kolkata, India
- Party: Democratic
- Spouse: Natasha Alagarasan (m. 2017)
- Education: Princeton University, MPP; University of Pennsylvania, MLA; Seton Hall Law School, JD; Thomas Edison State University, BA
- Website: Legislative webpage

Military service
- Branch/service: United States Marine Corps
- Years of service: 2001–2009

Raj Mukherji (born July 15, 1984) is an American businessman, lawyer, actor and Democratic Party politician who has represented the 32nd legislative district in the New Jersey Senate since 2024. He previously served five terms in the New Jersey General Assembly from 2014 to 2024, during which he served as majority whip and deputy speaker. He is a former healthcare and information technology CEO, former deputy mayor of Jersey City, former local prosecutor, and law professor.

Mukherji was first elected to the New Jersey General Assembly in 2013 and reelected in 2015, 2017, 2019, and 2021, and first elected to the Senate in 2023. He is a former U.S. Marine Corps sergeant who enlisted two weeks following the September 11 terrorist attacks. Mukherji serves as chairman of the Senate Military and Veterans’ Affairs Committee, vice chairman of the Senate Transportation Committee, and a member of the Health, Human Services and Senior Citizens Committee. In the assembly, he served as chairman of the Judiciary Committee and vice chairman of the Appropriations Committee and Telecommunications and Utilities Committee.

Mukherji started multiple successful businesses before completing his teenage years and was sworn into his first public office at age 24.

At 28, Mukherji – as a running-mate of longtime Senator Brian P. Stack – won a six-way Democratic primary election for the state assembly by a 36-point margin in 2013 and won the November general election by a 20-point margin, becoming the second South Asian legislator in state history and the first Bengali legislator in American history. In 2016 and 2017, Mukherji was identified by POLITICO as the most prolific lawmaker in the state because of his primary sponsorship of more bills signed into law than any other legislator.

The 32nd district includes the Hudson County municipalities of Jersey City and Hoboken.

== Early life, education, and career ==
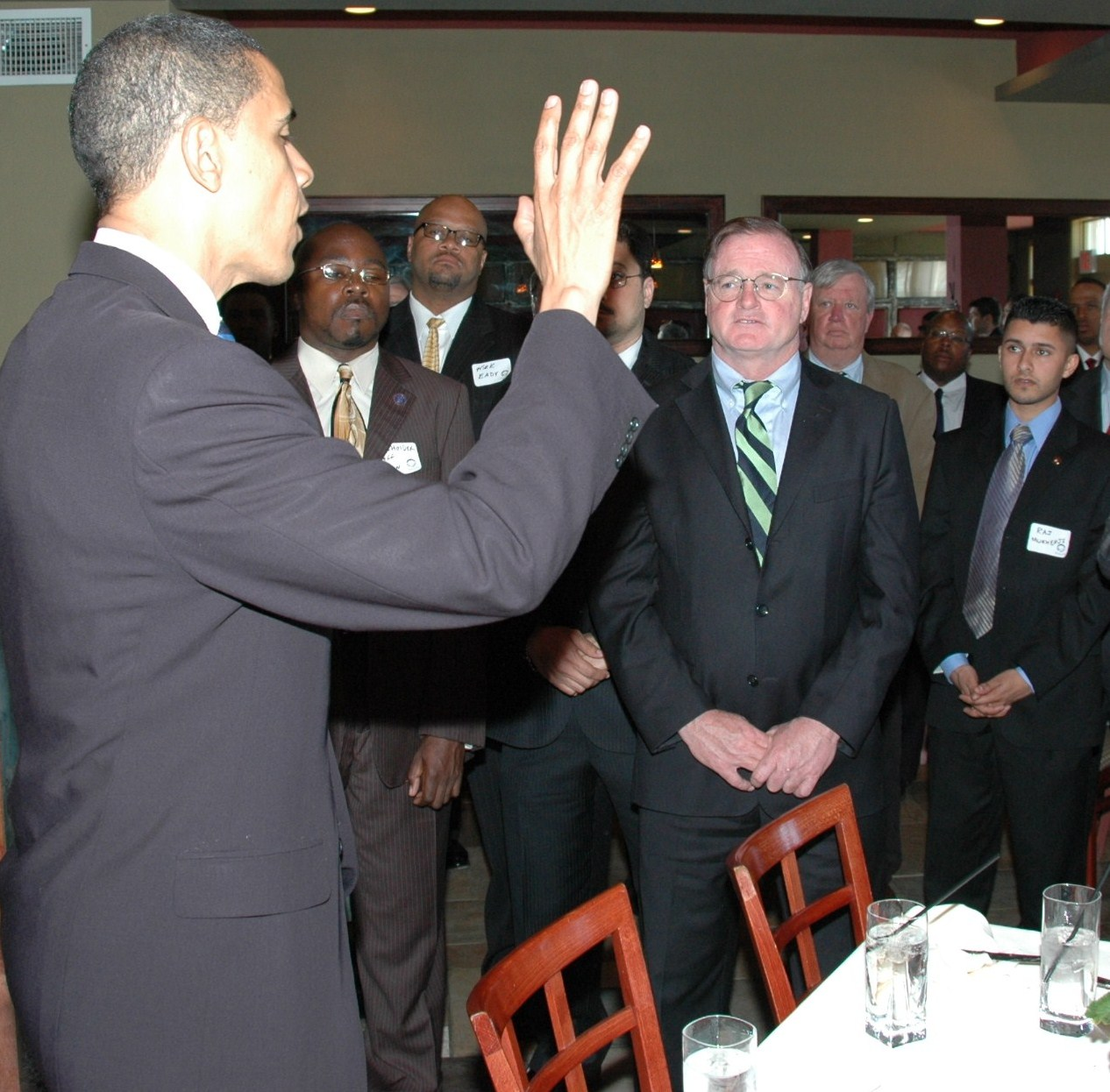
President Obama discusses urban issues with Jersey City leaders. From right to left: Mukherji, County Executive Tom DeGise, and then-Mayor Jerramiah Healy

Born in Kolkata, India, Mukherji is the son of Bengali immigrants who arrived from India in 1970. His family first settled in California, and then relocated to Fanwood, New Jersey. He attended Union County Magnet High School. While he was in high school, economic circumstances forced his parents to return to their native India and he stayed behind in the United States. While his parents were in India, he supported himself through high school, college, and grad school as an emancipated minor. After suffering a pituitary tumor, stroke, and other ailments, Mukherji's father – an accountant and musician – could no longer work as a result of his health but could not afford health coverage without employment.

Labeled a "wunderkind" by the media, Mukherji was the CEO of an Internet consulting and software development company that he founded while in the sixth grade. At age 17, Mukherji sold the company to a federal contractor in order to enlist in the Marine Corps two weeks after the September 11 terrorist attacks where he served as a reservist in military intelligence. The young entrepreneur withdrew from high school at 15 to enroll in an early college program at Bard College at Simon's Rock, eventually earning his bachelor's degree from Thomas Edison State University. He also holds a Master of Public Policy from Princeton University, a Master of Liberal Arts from the University of Pennsylvania, and a Juris Doctor, cum laude, from Seton Hall University School of Law, where he sits on the Board of Visitors. He has performed on Broadway and in motion pictures, as a member of the Screen Actors Guild (SAG-AFTRA).

Mukherji cofounded and led as CEO companies that achieved an aggregate half billion dollars in enterprise value, spanning healthcare, information technology, medical cannabis, and real estate. At 19, he had cofounded a public affairs firm that he grew into the state's third largest lawyer-lobbying firm, reportedly through his ties to New Jersey Democratic establishments and the Obama administration. In 2011, he was named an annual "Legends" honoree by the Hudson County Chamber of Commerce.

== Prior public service ==
At 24, Mukherji was appointed by the Mayor of Jersey City and confirmed by the City Council to replace Lori Serrano (who had been removed and was later charged with corruption) as the youngest Commissioner and Chairman to ever serve on the Jersey City Housing Authority, the state's second largest public housing authority and a $90 million agency serving over 16,000 residents and nearly 7,000 households. Mukherji served at the Housing Authority for over 15 years; during Mukherji's tenure, the JCHA was applauded for expanding affordable housing stock in Jersey City and by HUD for attaining the highest score for Section 8 management among similar agencies in the state. The agency was also showered with federal grants and aid from the Obama administration, which dispatched then-Secretary of Housing and Urban Development Shaun Donovan to Jersey City on multiple occasions to announce tens of millions in competitive federal grants the agency had won.

At 27, Mukherji was tapped to fill a vacancy as deputy mayor of Jersey City, New Jersey, the state's second largest city with a $500 million operating budget. According to The Jersey Journal, while deputy mayor, Mukherji declined the $110,056 salary and a city-issued car, instead opting to earn one dollar per year due to "the austere economic climate."

Mukherji was previously appointed by then-U.S. Senator Jon Corzine to his Military Academy Board in 2003. In 2004, Governor Jim McGreevey appointed him to the Governor's Council on Volunteerism and Community Service. He was also a Superior Court-appointed member of the Juvenile Conference Committee.

== Legislative career ==
In the Legislature, Mukherji has been a primary sponsor of hundreds of bills that passed both houses and were signed into law, including:

- Enacting a comprehensive, bipartisan overhaul of the state's outdated and ineffective bail system and expanding legal aid for low-income New Jerseyans;
- Combating the state's heroin, opiate, and prescription drug addiction epidemic by requiring physicians and pharmacists to access the state's Prescription Monitoring Program to prevent "doctor shopping;"
- Making New Jersey the first state in the United States to enact a ban on ivory commerce (in an effort to thwart profits for poachers and wildlife traffickers and to protect elephants and other endangered or threatened species), which effort garnered public support for Mukherji's ivory ban legislation by actress Meryl Streep and musician Billy Joel and inspired similar prohibitions in other states;
- Legislation expanding the state's Drug Court programs and creating a substance abuse recovery housing program at NJ's four-year public colleges and universities with on-campus housing in order to provide a supportive substance-free dormitory environment that recognizes the unique risks and challenges faced by recovering students, along with other legislation expanding access to mental health and substance abuse treatment and recovery services;
- Repealing prohibitions on sports betting in New Jersey to help Atlantic City's gaming industry rebound;
- "The Parkinson's Disease Public Awareness and Education Act," a first-in-the-nation law dedicating resources to create a public education and outreach campaign for Parkinson's disease diagnosis and treatment, inspiring a similar effort in Kansas;
- Combating bedbugs by requiring sanitation, protective, and labeling procedures in the sale of used mattresses and boxsprings;
- Legislation improving prison addiction recovery programs (allowing certain drug treatment programs to operate in state and county jails) to help break the cycle of recidivism;
- Creating criminal penalties for fatal hit-and-run boating accidents;
- Improving the state's higher education system, develop an advanced cyberinfrastructure plan, and initiate a Big Data consortium; and
- Securing state infrastructure investments for his home county of Hudson.

=== Committees ===
Committee assignments for the 2026-2027 Legislative Session are:

- Military and Veterans’ Affairs, Chair
- Transportation, Vice Chair
- Health, Human Services and Senior Citizens

=== District 32 ===
Each of the 40 districts in the New Jersey Legislature has one representative in the New Jersey Senate and two representatives in the New Jersey General Assembly. The representatives from the 32nd District for the 2026—2027 Legislative Session are:

- Senator Raj Mukherji (D)
- Assemblyman Ravinder Bhalla (D)
- Assemblywoman Katie Brennan (D)

== Controversy ==
Mukherji became embroiled in controversy when he was tapped to be the new chairman of the Jersey City Housing Authority. Amidst his nomination, critics opposed the Housing Authority's plans to demolish and redevelop a six-tower 549-unit public housing project known as Montgomery Gardens. Later, while under Mukherji's leadership, the agency came under fire for its strict "One-Strike" eviction policy, enabled by federal legislation enacted under President Clinton, allowing housing authorities to evict entire households where a resident is charged with a serious crime (without being convicted). While defending the legislation, Mukherji convened public hearings prior to ordering an overhaul of the One-Strike policy, telling Jersey City Independent that the policy had "served as a deterrent and important tool to reduce drug-related and violent criminal activity in public housing (...but) certain revisions may be appropriate to ensure an equitable policy and eviction process... We want to be fair and equitable to criminal defendants, as the presumption of innocence must be sacrosanct, while being mindful that our foremost responsibility is to do all that we can to keep our tenants safe."

As a teenager, Mukherji pleaded guilty to a misdemeanor charge of possession of a fake identification in 2004 that was used for underage drinking.

== Personal life ==
Mukherji married Google project manager and former NY1 producer Natasha Alagarasan in a Hindu ceremony on September 16, 2017.

== Electoral history ==
=== Senate ===
32nd Legislative District General Election, 2023
| Party | Candidate | Votes | % |
|---|---|---|---|
| Democratic | Raj Mukherji | 15,175 | 83.1 |
| Republican | Ilyas Mohammed | 3,083 | 16.9 |
| Total votes | | 18,258 | 100.0 |
| Democratic hold | | | |

=== General Assembly ===
33rd legislative district general election, 2021
| Party | Candidate | Votes | % |
|---|---|---|---|
| Democratic | Annette Chaparro (incumbent) | 33,463 | 40.86% |
| Democratic | Raj Mukherji (incumbent) | 33,189 | 40.53% |
| Republican | Marcos Marte | 7,685 | 9.38% |
| Republican | Jacob Curtis | 7,551 | 9.22% |
| Total votes | | 81,888 | 100.0 |
| Democratic hold | | | |

33rd Legislative District General Election, 2019
| Party | Candidate | Votes | % |
|---|---|---|---|
| Democratic | Raj Mukherji (incumbent) | 23,644 | 42.41% |
| Democratic | Annette Chaparro (incumbent) | 23,572 | 42.28% |
| Republican | Holly Lucyk | 4,462 | 8% |
| Republican | Fabian Rohena | 4,075 | 7.31% |
| Total votes | | 49,855 | 100% |
| Democratic hold | | | |

New Jersey Senate
| Preceded by Nicholas Sacco | Member of the New Jersey Senate for the 32nd District; January 9, 2024 – present | Succeeded by Incumbent |
New Jersey General Assembly
| Preceded by Sean Connors; Ruben J. Ramos | Member of the New Jersey General Assembly for the 33rd District; January 14, 2014 – January 9, 2024; With: Carmelo Garcia, Annette Chaparro | Succeeded by John Allen, Jessica Ramirez |
Political offices
| Preceded by Leona Beldini | Deputy Mayor of Jersey City, New Jersey; March 2, 2012 – June 30, 2013 | Succeeded by John Thieroff |
