= Hoboken High School =

High school in New Jersey, United States

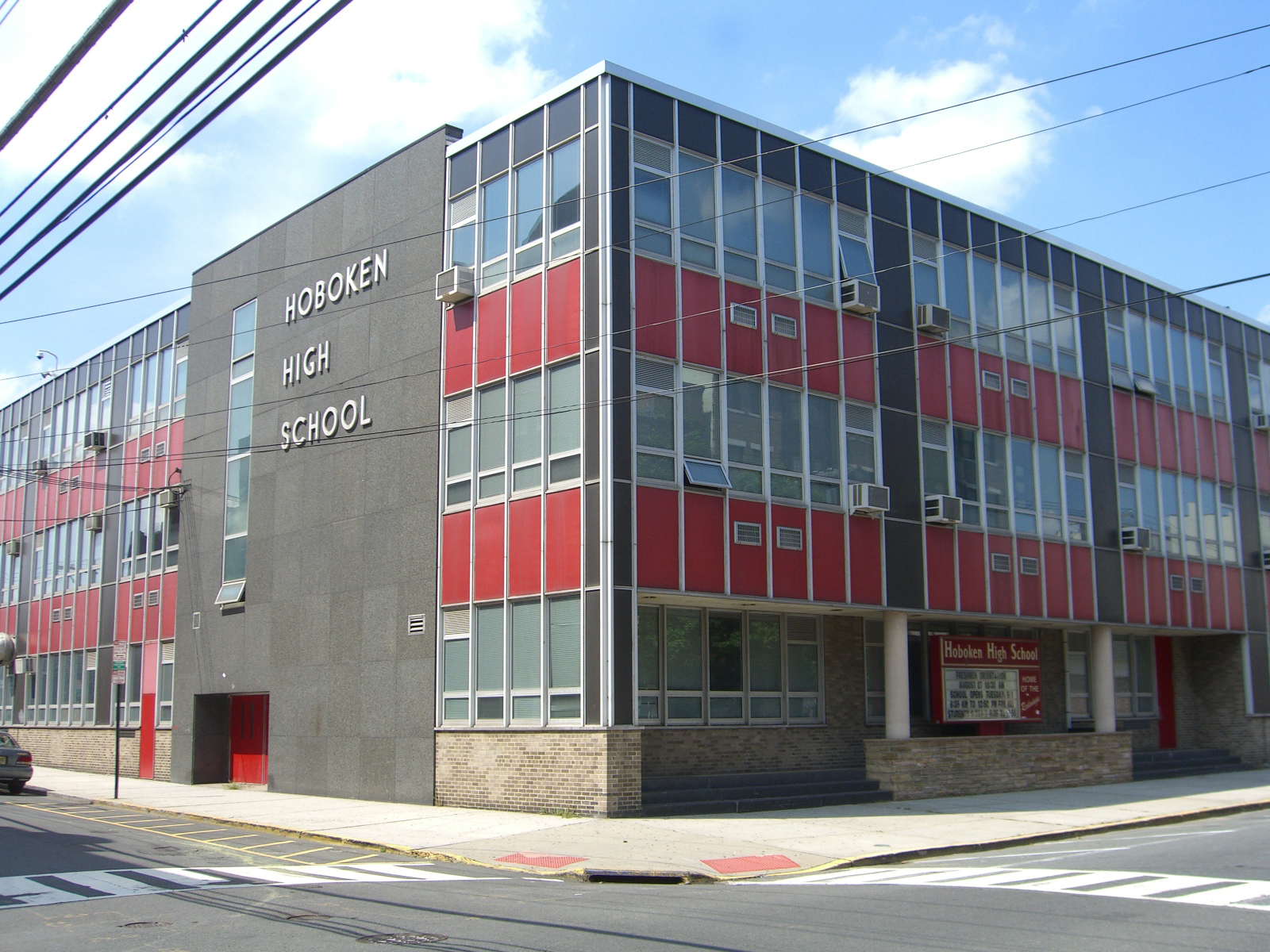

Location
- 800 Clinton Street; Hoboken, Hudson County, New Jersey 07030; United States; 40.7476°N 74.0331°W

Information
- Type: Public high school
- Opened: September 1962
- School district: Hoboken Public Schools
- NCES School ID: 340735002746
- Principal: Robin Piccapietra
- Faculty: 46.7 FTEs
- Grades: 9 - 12
- Enrollment: 652 (as of 2024–25)
- Student to teacher ratio: 14.0:1
- Colors: Red and white
- Athletics conference: Hudson County Interscholastic League (general); North Jersey Super Football Conference (football)
- Team name: Redwings
- Website: Official website

Hoboken High School (HHS) is a four-year comprehensive public high school serving students in ninth through twelfth grades, located in Hoboken, in Hudson County, in the U.S. state of New Jersey, operating as the lone secondary school of the Hoboken Public Schools. The school has been accredited by the Middle States Association of Colleges and Schools Commission on Elementary and Secondary Schools since 1928.

Starting in the 2013–14 school year, the school had operated as a combined junior-senior high school. In 2016–17, the middle school was split off to serve grades seven and eight, with plans to move the middle school to the A.J. Demarest building.

As of the 2024–25 school year, the school had an enrollment of 652 students and 46.7 classroom teachers (on an FTE basis), for a student–teacher ratio of 14.0:1. There were 340 students (52.1% of enrollment) eligible for free lunch and none eligible for reduced-cost lunch.

== History ==
The current Hoboken High School was constructed with a capacity of 1,500 students and opened in September 1962 for grades 10-12. Prior to that time, A. J. Demarest High School, dedicated in the autumn of 1911, served as the city's high school. When the current high school was built, Demarest became a junior high school serving grades 7-9, and it is currently the site of the city's pre-K 3 and pre-K 4 program. Hoboken High School serves grades 9 - 12.

== Awards, recognition and rankings ==
The school was the 274th-ranked public high school in New Jersey out of 339 schools statewide in New Jersey Monthly magazine's September 2014 cover story on the state's "Top Public High Schools", using a new ranking methodology. The school had been ranked 298th in the state of 328 schools in 2012, after being ranked 187th in 2010 out of 322 schools listed. The magazine ranked the school 139th in 2008 out of 316 schools. The school was ranked 260th in the magazine's September 2006 issue, which surveyed 316 schools across the state. The September 2008 issue of New Jersey Monthly magazine noted Hoboken High School as the second most improved high school in the state, having jumped from 260 in 2006 to 139 in 2008. Schooldigger.com ranked the school 327th out of 367 public high schools statewide in its 2009-10 rankings which were based on the combined percentage of students classified as proficient or above proficient on the language arts literacy and mathematics components of the High School Proficiency Assessment (HSPA).

Rachel Grygiel, a Social Studies teacher at HHS, was honored by Princeton University in 2011 as an "exceptional" secondary school teacher, as one of three other teachers honored throughout the entire state.

== Student body ==
As for the 2012–13 school year, the student body of the school was 63.7% Hispanic, 20.4% Black, 14% White and 1.9% Asian.

== Academics ==
As of the 2011–12 school year, the school began a transition from the International Baccalaureate Diploma Program to a program based on Advanced Placement courses.

Students are also able to select from a variety of classes that would not otherwise be available or to complete advanced coursework beyond what is offered at the high school through the Virtual High School Collaborative.

== Extracurricular activities ==
=== Athletics ===
The Hoboken High School Redwings compete in the Hudson County Interscholastic League, which is comprised of public and private high schools in Hudson County, operating under the supervision of the New Jersey State Interscholastic Athletic Association (NJSIAA). With 328 students in grades 10–12, the school was classified by the NJSIAA for the 2019–20 school year as Group I for most athletic competition purposes, which included schools with an enrollment of 75 to 476 students in that grade range. The football team competes in the National Red division of the North Jersey Super Football Conference, which includes 112 schools competing in 20 divisions, making it the nation's biggest football-only high school sports league. The school was classified by the NJSIAA as Group II North for football for 2024–2026, which included schools with 484 to 683 students.

The school participates as the host school / lead agency in a joint girls lacrosse team with Weehawken High School. In turn, Weehawken is the host school for a joint boys lacrosse team. These co-op programs operate under agreements scheduled to expire at the end of the 2023–24 school year.

Hoboken High School offers over 24 athletic programs with over 30% student participation. Interscholastic sports offered at the school include:

Fall:

- Football: Varsity, Junior Varsity, Freshman
- Boys' Soccer: Varsity, Junior Varsity
- Girls' Soccer: Varsity, Junior Varsity
- Girls' Tennis: Varsity, Junior Varsity
- Girls' Volleyball: Varsity, Junior Varsity
- Boys' and Girls' Cross Country Track: Varsity
- Cheerleading: Varsity
- Strutters: Varsity

Winter:

- Boys' Basketball: Varsity, Junior Varsity, Freshman
- Girls' Basketball: Varsity
- Boys' and Girls' Swimming: Varsity
- Boys' and Girls' Bowling: Varsity
- Boys' and Girls' Indoor Track: Varsity
- Cheerleading: Varsity
- Strutters: Varsity

Spring:

- Baseball: Varsity, Junior Varsity
- Softball: Varsity, Junior Varsity
- Boys' Tennis: Varsity, Junior Varsity
- Boys' Outdoor Track: Varsity
- Girls' Outdoor Track: Varsity

In 1924, the boys' basketball team won the Group IV (then known as Class A) state championship, defeating Trenton Central High School by a score of 24–14 in the tournament final in front of 3,000 fans at the Jersey City Armory.

The football team won the NJSIAA state sectional championships in North I Group III in 1980, 1994–1996, 1998 and 1999, and won the sectional title in North II Group I in 2005, 2012 and 2013. The team won the program's first state title in 1980 with a 10–0 win in the North I Group III championship game played at Giants Stadium against Ramsey High School. In 1994, the team used a strong running game to win the North I Group III title with a 21–0 win against Ramsey in the sectional final. The 1995 team finished the season 11-0 after winning the North I Group III state sectional title by defeating Sparta High School by a score of 37–6 in the championship game. The 1996 team finished the season 11-0 and was ranked 10th in the nation by USA Today after winning their third consecutive title with a 33–12 win in the finals against Passaic Valley Regional High School. The 1998 football team won the state sectional title over Wayne Hills High School with a 14–7 win in the tournament final at Giants Stadium; the win was the team's fourth title in five years. From 1995 to 1998, the team went 50–1, with team's only loss in that four-year span coming in 1997 in overtime against Ramapo High School in the sectional championship game. The 2005 football team won the North II, Group I state sectional championship with a 21–6 win over Verona High School. The football team won back-to-back North II, Group I state sectional titles, beating Roselle Park High School 39–9 in 2012 and edging Malcolm X Shabazz High School 13–7 in 2013.

The boys' soccer team won the Group III state championship in 1991, defeating Scotch Plains-Fanwood High School in the tournament final.

The softball team won the North II, Group I sectional title in 2007, edging Secaucus High School by a score of 8–7 in 14 innings in the tournament final. The baseball team matched the feat, earning the North II, Group I title with a 5–4 win against Lyndhurst High School.

=== Theater and drama ===
Hoboken High School's Musical Theatre and Drama program began in 1997 with the school's production of The Wiz (which was later revived by the high school in 2007) and has since produced popular shows such as Fiddler On The Roof, Mean Girls, School of Rock, Once On This Island, West Side Story, Aida and Hairspray.

Under the leadership of theater director Paula O'Haus, students in the program earned numerous Paper Mill Playhouse Rising Star Awards, STANj Governor's Awards and were profiled by The New York Times.

=== Harvard Model Congress ===
Hoboken High School participates in Harvard Model Congress, an annual four-day congressional simulation conference in which students, assuming the role of specific U.S. congressmen and other government, debate and enact legislation, in order to gain the experience of how government works.

=== Clubs ===
- African American Club
- Agape Club
- Computer Club
- Drama Club
- Emergency Response Team
- Environmental Science Club
- French Club
- Gay Straight Alliance Club
- Harvard Model Congress
- Hispanic Culture Club
- Italian Club
- CREATE literary magazine
- Math Club
- Model United Nations
- National Honor Society
- Rebel Club
- Science Fair
- School Newspaper
- Outdoor/Sierra Club
- Student Council
- Yearbook
- Senior Class Club
- Junior Class Club
- Sophomore Class Club
- Freshman Class Club

== Administration ==
The school's principal is Robin Piccapietra. Her core administration team includes the two vice principals.

== Notable alumni ==
Note that alumni include those students who attended A. J. Demarest High School from 1911 to 1962.

- Derrick Alston (born 1972), professional basketball player
- Robert Ayers (born 1985), defensive end who has played in the NFL for the Denver Broncos, New York Giants and Tampa Bay Buccaneers
- Steve Cappiello (1923–2013), police officer and politician who served from 1973 until 1985 as the Mayor of Hoboken
- Annette Chaparro (born 1967), politician who has represented the 33rd Legislative District in the New Jersey General Assembly since 2016
- Ronald Dario (1937–2004), politician who represented the 33rd Legislative District in the New Jersey General Assembly from 1984 to 1986
- Julio Fernández (born 1954, class of 1972), guitarist and composer best known as the current and longtime guitarist for the jazz-fusion band Spyro Gyra
- Thomas Gallo (1914–1994), politician who served 11 years in the New Jersey General Assembly, including five full terms representing the 33rd Legislative District
- Nat Hickey (1902–1979), oldest person to play an NBA game
- Bill Kunkel (1936–1985), former MLB relief pitcher who went on to become a major league umpire from 1968 to 1984
- Janet Lupo (1950–2017), model who was Playboy magazine's Playmate of the Month for its November 1975 issue
- Johnny Romano (1934–2019), former MLB catcher who was selected four times as an All Star
- David Saperstein (1901–1990), lawyer and government regulator who helped create the Securities and Exchange Commission
- Angelo Savoldi (1914–2013), professional wrestler and wrestling promoter
- Frank Sinatra (1915–1998), singer, actor and producer
- David Walsh (1889–1975), referee who was inducted into the Basketball Hall of Fame in 1961
