= Annette Chaparro =

American politician (born 1967)

Member of the New Jersey State Parole Board
- Incumbent
- Assumed office January 7, 2025
- Preceded by: Carmen M. Garcia

Member of the New Jersey General Assembly from the 33rd district
- In office January 12, 2016 – January 9, 2024 Serving with Raj Mukherji
- Preceded by: Carmelo Garcia
- Succeeded by: John Allen; Jessica Ramirez

Personal details
- Born: October 8, 1967 (age 58)
- Party: Democratic
- Education: Hoboken High School
- Website: Legislative web page

Annette Chaparro (born October 8, 1967) is an American Democratic Party politician who has represented the 33rd Legislative District in the New Jersey General Assembly since she was sworn into office on January 12, 2016. Chapparo has served in the Assembly as Deputy Speaker Pro Tempore since 2022.

A resident of Hoboken, New Jersey, Chaparro graduated from Hoboken High School and works as a clerk for the City of Hoboken.

== New Jersey Assembly ==
After the local Democratic Party decided to keep Assemblyman Carmelo Garcia off the primary ballot, a deal was reached in March 2015 between Senator Brian P. Stack, who is the mayor of Union City, and Hoboken Mayor Dawn Zimmer to nominate Chaparro to replace Garcia on the ballot.

=== Legislation ===
In the 2018-2019 legislative session, Chaparro was primary sponsor on the following bills signed into law:

- A-1428 Requires Department of Education to develop guidelines for school districts concerning child trafficking awareness and prevention.
- A-5002 Permits certain planned real estate developments to file certain liens; concerns limited priority of certain liens.
- AJR-122 Designates September 20 of each year as Hispanic Journalist Pride Day.

=== Committees ===
Committee assignments for the current session are:

- Law and Public Safety, Vice-Chair
- Tourism, Gaming and the Arts, Vice-Chair
- Budget

=== District 33 ===
Each of the 40 districts in the New Jersey Legislature has one representative in the New Jersey Senate and two members in the New Jersey General Assembly. The representatives from the 33rd District for the 2022—23 Legislative Session are:

- Senator Brian P. Stack (D)
- Assemblywoman Annette Chaparro (D)
- Assemblyman Raj Mukherji (D)

== Post-Assembly Career ==
On June 28, 2024, Chaparro was nominated by the New Jersey Senate Judiciary Committee to succeed Carmen M. Garcia as member of the New Jersey State Parole Board on the expiration of her term on January 7, 2025.

New Jersey General Assembly
Preceded by Carmelo Garcia	Member of the New Jersey General Assembly for the 33rd District; January 12, 2016 – present With: Raj Mukherji	Succeeded by Incumbent
