= Union Hill High School =

Defunct high school in Hudson County, New Jersey, United States

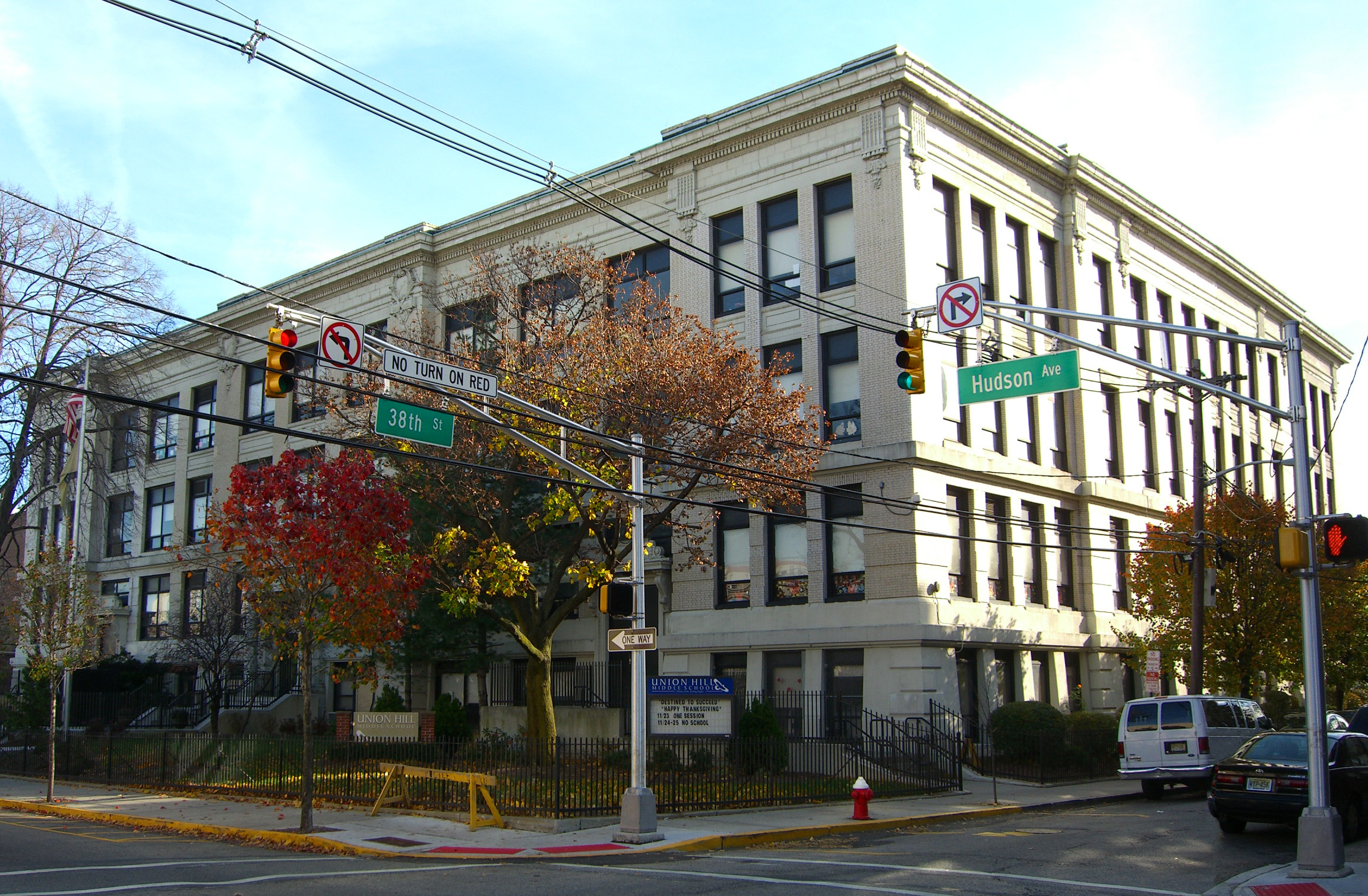

Location
- 3800 Hudson Avenue; Union City, Hudson County, New Jersey 07087; United States; 40°46′26″N 74°01′24″W

Information
- Type: Public
- Established: 1888
- Closed: 2008
- School district: Union City School District (New Jersey)
- Grades: 9–12
- Colors: Orange and Blue
- Nickname: Hillers

Union Hill High School was a public high school serving students in grades 9–12 from Union City in Hudson County, in the U.S. state of New Jersey, operating as one of two high schools of the Union City Board of Education, an Abbott District. The school was built in—and named for—what was formerly Union Hill, a municipality which merged with West Hoboken in 1925 to form Union City. Until 2008, Union Hill was one of the city's two high schools, with the former Emerson High School the other. The Union Hill and Emerson campuses continued to serve high school students for an additional year as separate campuses of the new Union City High School, after which that school's main campus was completed and both schools were converted to their current designation. The building that housed Union Hill High School is now Union Hill Middle School and houses students in grades seven and eight.

== History ==
Established in 1886 as Town of Union High School, the original and second sites of the high school were repurposed grammar school buildings, with the first graduating class being in 1888. The school occupied a floor at the Union Hill town hall until 1914, when a new building was completed at a cost of $400,000 (equivalent to $12.9 million in 2025). In 1925, the town merged with its neighbor to the south, West Hoboken, which had been served by Emerson High School, to form the city of Union City, after which the school was officially renamed as Union Hill High School. As the city was now served by two high schools, students who lived north of Route 495 (which previously divided the two municipalities) would attend Union Hill, while those who lived south of it would attend Emerson, though that boundary was shifted in later years to keep the school enrollments roughly equal.

The school was first accredited by the Middle States Association of Colleges and Secondary Schools in 1928. From 1888 through its 119th graduating class in June 1961, more than 10,000 students had graduated from the school.

By 2007, both Union Hill and Emerson, which are separated by one mile, had close to 1,500 students and offered the same schedule, courses, and after-school sports, and their test scores and student demographics were comparable. Unlike Emerson, Union Hill did not have a Reserve Officers Training Corps (ROTC) program, though Union Hill had a stronger arts program than Emerson, and both schools had different career education programs that allowed students to pursue interests like child care, hospitality, and fashion (the city was once known for its embroidery factories). Superintendent of Schools Stanley M. Sanger stated in 2007 that he received 25 to 40 requests a year from students who want to switch to the rival high school due to a particular academic interest or a family connection. Most such requests were granted.

In September 2009, Union Hill High School and Emerson High Schools converted into middle schools, and a new school, Union City High School, opened for grades 10–12 in new a building on the site of the former Roosevelt Stadium.

The school was the 233rd-ranked public high school in New Jersey out of 316 schools statewide, in New Jersey Monthly magazine's September 2008 cover story on the state's Top Public High Schools. The school was ranked 268th in the magazine's September 2006 issue, which surveyed 316 schools across the state.

== Athletics ==
During Union Hill and Emerson's time as Union City's two high schools, the Union Hill Hillers and the Emerson Bulldogs were rivals in athletics. In competing for the Hudson County Interscholastic Football Championship, Union Hill beat Emerson five consecutive years from 1923 to 1927. During the November 1927 game, Union Hill beat their rivals 19 to 0 in front of a crowd of 12,000 people.

The boys' basketball team won the Group IV state championship in 1919 (defeating Passaic High School in the tournament final), 1955 (vs. New Brunswick High School) and 1956 (vs. Trenton Central High School). A crowd of 2,000 spectators at Rutgers University saw the 1956 team win their second straight Group IV title, holding off Trenton with a 70–68 victory in the championship game.

The boys' bowling team won the overall state championship in 1972.

=== Turkey game ===
For 88 consecutive years, the most notable aspect of their rivalry on the field was the annual Turkey Game, held on Thanksgiving, a tradition that began in 1919, when the high schools served the neighboring municipalities of West Hoboken in the south and Union Hill in the north, a rivalry described as "simmering hatred" that gave the schools' principals cause to fear that the first game might turn ugly. That game ended in a tie of 0–0. When Union Hill and West Hoboken merged in 1925 to form Union City, the Turkey Game remained, despite the fact that schools in the same district usually do not often compete directly against each other.

In the 1930s and 1940s, the Turkey Game attracted as many as 15,000 fans. A wooden chariot would be pulled around the field at halftime, carrying the football king and queen from the defending school, who were booed and pelted with paper when they got to the opposing side of Roosevelt Stadium. This part of the tradition fell into disuse by the early 1970s.

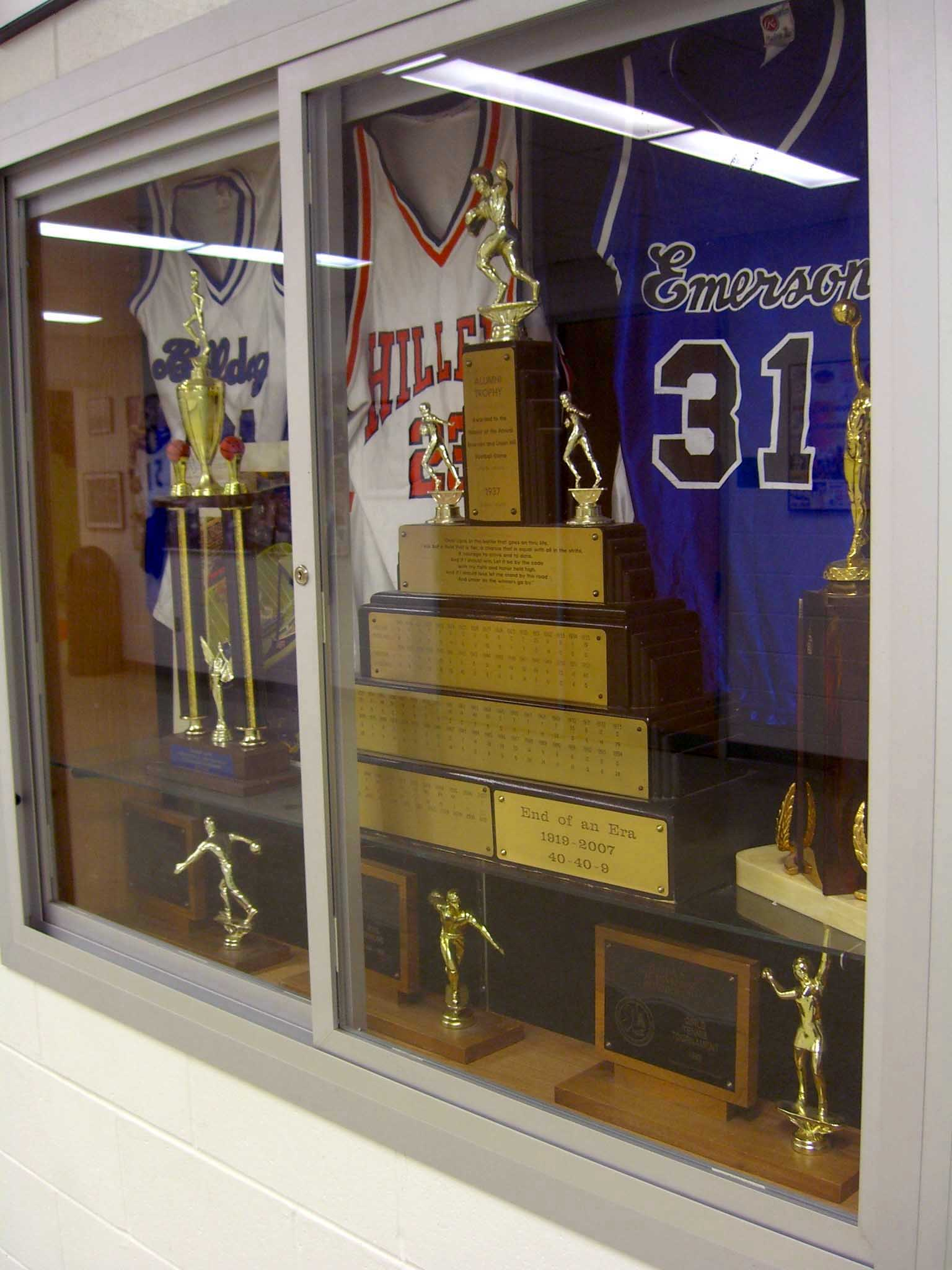
The Alumni Trophy, which was awarded to the victor of the annual Turkey Game, now sits in Union City High School. On the lower right of the trophy is the inscription: End of an Era 1919–2007 40–40–9

Stanley M. Sanger, who graduated from Emerson in 1969, and who never set foot in Union Hill until he became a teacher, characterized the Union Hill–Emerson rivalry by saying, "It's our Mason–Dixon line. You knew Union Hill was north and Emerson was south, and you respected the boundary. It was the natural state of things." An old traditional greeting before the game was "Are we having hot turkey or cold turkey?", as the loser was said to eat "cold turkey", figuratively speaking. Over the decades, coaches were known to zealously guard their game plans and players, who were alert for spies, were often excused from their classes to practice in secret locations. When sharing Roosevelt Stadium for practice, they would use opposite ends of the 50 yard line. While the athletic coaches were not permitted to recruit players from the rival school, students were known to often recruit players from the elementary and middle schools to attend their high schools. A 50 lbs. brass trophy whose base is engraved with scores from every game, was passed back and forth between the two schools, and the winning school was rewarded with a half-day of school on the Monday after the game. According to David Wilcomes, a former football player and later football coach and the last principal of Union Hill High School, the Turkey Game developed a nearly religious significance as a Thanksgiving ritual for Union City citizens, and a loss for one's favored team would cast a pall upon the day's subsequent holiday festivities, commenting, "If you don't win, it's a long Thanksgiving dinner." Wilcomes, whose father also played for Union Hill, stated that he stopped answering his home phone following losing games because of the endless reviewing and second-guessing of his strategies by various relatives. By 2007, the Union City district spent $130,000 annually on football.

Neither school was a regional powerhouse. Statistically, both endured cycles of consecutive wins and losses, and were roughly even in statistics, with Emerson having won 40 games, Union Hill, 39, and 9 ties. Union Hill won the 2006 game, while Emerson won the seven games prior. The Turkey Game tradition ended with its final game on November 22, 2007, prior to the two schools' merger into Union City High School, which is now housed on the site of the former Roosevelt Stadium, and features an athletic field on its roof. (During the year between the end of the Turkey Game and the September 2009 opening of Union City High School, the two schools shared the facilities at José Martí Middle School.) The district spent $2,000 on newspaper ads to invite alumni from around the state to the game and to an alumni breakfast that preceded it. The district installed additional bleachers to accommodate an expected turnout of more than 4,000. It sold commemorative tickets featuring photos of the 1919 Union Hill and Emerson teams, and a game program whose proceeds went the new school's scholarship fund. During the final game, both principals sat together at halftime to present a united front, and the players on both teams were required to wear T-shirts bearing the new school's name under their shoulder pads. The final Turkey game was attended by 6,000 spectators, including Senator Robert Menendez (an alumnus of Union Hill), and saw Union Hill beat Emerson with a score of 20–8, tying Emerson's historical win record of 40-40.

The Turkey Game trophy is today housed in Union City High School, whose players are known as the Soaring Eagles. The end of the Turkey Game came amid waning Thanksgiving football traditions in communities across the United States, as earlier football seasons and competing holiday demands on players and their families made them less relevant. Post-holiday state championships have also overtaken such traditions in importance, as coaches grew reluctant to risk injury to players headed for the championships.

== Notable alumni ==
- Al Bansavage (1938–2003), American football linebacker who played in the American Football League for the Los Angeles Chargers and the Oakland Raiders
- Bobby Cannavale (born 1970), actor Emmy Award-winning actor known for his role as Bobby Caffey on the television series Third Watch
- Harry Donovan (born 1926), professional basketball player for the New York Knicks
- Henry Escalante, pop musician, and one of the 15 finalists from the 2007 season of the MTV reality show Making Menudo
- Lucio Fernandez, politician and entertainer
- Rafael Fraguela (born 1955, class of 1974), politician who served in the New Jersey General Assembly, where he represented the 33rd Legislative District
- Nikos Galis (born 1957), retired Greek basketball player and member of the FIBA and Naismith basketball halls of fame
- Rudy Garcia (born 1964), former Assemblyman and mayor of Union City
- Nicholas LaRocca (1913–1999), politician who served in both houses of the New Jersey Legislature from the 33rd Legislative District
- John Markert (1929–2011), politician who served four terms in the New Jersey General Assembly, where he represented the 39th Legislative District
- Bob Menendez (born 1954), politician who served in the United States Senate from New Jersey from 2006 until his resignation in 2024
- Tommy O'Brien (1916–1955), professional basketball player who played for the Akron Firestone Non-Skids in the National Basketball League
- Joe Oriolo (1913–1985), cartoon animator, writer, director and producer, who was co-creator of Casper the Friendly Ghost and the creator of the Felix the Cat TV series
- Togo Palazzi (1932–2022), basketball player who played in the NBA for the Boston Celtics and Syracuse Nationals
- Frederick Reines (1918–1998), Nobel Prize-winning physicist who co-discovered the neutrino
- Caridad Rodriguez (born 1947), politician who served in the New Jersey General Assembly, where she represented the 33rd Legislative District from 2008 to 2011
- Fred Shabel (1932–2023), college basketball player-coach and sports executive who was the Connecticut Huskies men's basketball head coach from 1963 through 1967
- Pedro Sosa (born 1984) former American football offensive tackle for the Hartford Colonials of the defunct United Football League, and later a member of the Miami Dolphins
- Allison Strong (born 1976) actress/singer known for her Broadway work in the musicals Bye Bye Birdie and Mamma Mia!

== Notable faculty ==
- Marcel Gleyre (1910–1996), gymnast who coached the school's gymnastic teams
