= Robert Ranieri =

American politician

Member of the New Jersey General Assembly from the 33rd district
- In office January 10, 1984 – January 7, 1986 Serving with Nicholas LaRocca
- Preceded by: Thomas Gallo; Christopher Jackman
- Succeeded by: Ronald Dario; Jose Arango

Personal details
- Born: February 25, 1929 (age 97)
- Party: Democratic
- Education: St. Peter's University

Robert A. Ranieri (born February 25, 1929) was an American Democratic Party politician who represented the 33rd legislative district in the New Jersey General Assembly.

== Early life ==
Ranieri was born in 1929 in Hoboken, New Jersey, and attended St. Michael's High School in Union City and Leonia High School, before graduating in 1950 from St. Peter's College (since renamed as Saint Peter's University). Ranierei was elected in 1973 to serve as a member of the Hoboken City Council, and was re-elected twice thereafter.

== New Jersey General Assembly ==
In the 1983 election, LaRocca and Ranieri defeated Republican candidates Francisco Cossio and Jorge T. Gallo.

In the 1985 election, Ranieri lost his bid fore re-election when he and newcomer Mario R. Hernandez were defeated by Republicans Jose Arango of West New York and Ronald Dario of Union City. The two Republican victors were among a group of four who were the first to represent the county in the State Assembly in more than 60 years.

== Election results ==
New Jersey general election, 1983
Party	Candidate	Votes	%	±%
Democratic	Robert A. Ranieri	17,378	32.7	▼0.6
Democratic	Nicholas LaRocca	17,121	32.2	▼1.0
Republican	Jorge T. Gallo	9,532	17.9	▲0.9
Republican	Francisco Cossio	9,149	17.2	▲0.7
Total votes		53,180	100.0	

New Jersey general election, 1985
Party	Candidate	Votes	%	±%
Republican	Ronald Dario	20,422	27.9	▲10.0
Republican	Jose Arango	19,748	26.9	▲9.7
Democratic	Robert A. Ranieri	17,443	23.8	▼8.9
Democratic	Mario R. Hernandez	15,671	21.4	▼10.8
Total votes		'73,284'	'100.0'	
