= Ruben Ramos (politician) =

American politician (born 1973)

Member of the New Jersey General Assembly from the 33rd district
- In office January 8, 2008 – January 14, 2014
- Preceded by: Brian P. Stack; Silverio Vega
- Succeeded by: Carmelo Garcia

Personal details
- Born: Ruben J. Ramos, Jr. December 30, 1973 (age 52) Hoboken, New Jersey, U.S.
- Party: Democratic
- Spouse: Norma Parra Ramos
- Children: 2
- Education: Fairleigh Dickinson University
- Occupation: Teacher
- Profession: Politician
- Website: Assembly Majority Website

Ruben J. Ramos, Jr. (born December 30, 1973) is an American Democratic Party politician who served in the New Jersey General Assembly from 2008 to 2014, representing the 33rd Legislative District. He now serves as the 4th ward city councilman in Hoboken, a position he held prior to serving in the General Assembly.

Ramos and his running mates won a contentious primary battle in June 2007, defeating a slate supported by the Hudson County Democratic Organization led by then-Assemblyman Silverio Vega.

The youngest elected official in Hoboken history, he represented the Fourth Ward and served as city council president. Ramos, a teacher by profession, is employed by the Paterson Public Schools.

He simultaneously held a seat in the New Jersey General Assembly and on the City Council. This dual position, often called double dipping, is allowed under a grandfather clause in the state law enacted by the New Jersey Legislature and signed into law by Governor of New Jersey Jon Corzine in September 2007 that prevents dual-office-holding but allows those who had held both positions as of February 1, 2008, to retain both posts.

Ramos was awarded a B.A. from Fairleigh Dickinson University, with a major in Political Science.

== District 33 ==
Each of the forty districts in the New Jersey Legislature has one representative in the New Jersey Senate and two members in the New Jersey General Assembly. The other representatives from the 33rd District for the 2012-2013 Legislative Session are:

- Senator Brian P. Stack, and
- Assemblyman Sean Connors

== Run for Mayor of Hoboken ==
On February 22, 2013, Ramos announced that he is running for the position of Mayor of Hoboken in the November 2013 elections against incumbent Dawn Zimmer, together with a slate of candidates for City Council. Ramos said that he would not run for re-election to the Assembly in 2014.
