= Caridad Rodriguez =

American politician (born 1947)

Member of the Hudson County Board of County Commissioners from the 7th district
- Incumbent
- Assumed office January 1, 2015
- Preceded by: Jose Carlos Munoz

Member of the New Jersey General Assembly from the 33rd district
- In office January 8, 2008 – May 17, 2011
- Preceded by: Brian P. Stack; Silverio Vega
- Succeeded by: Sean Connors

Personal details
- Born: September 20, 1947 (age 78)
- Party: Democratic
- Website: Assembly Majority Web site

Caridad "Cary" Rodriguez (born September 20, 1947) is an American Democratic Party politician, who served in the New Jersey General Assembly, where she represented the 33rd Legislative District from 2008 until she resigned to take office as a commissioner of West New York, New Jersey in May 2011.

== Career life ==
Rodriguez and her running mates won a strongly fought primary battle in June 2007, defeating a slate supported by the Hudson County Democratic Organization led by then-Assemblyman Silverio Vega.

Rodriguez served in West New York as Commissioner of Parks and Public Property from 2006-07.

She served in the Assembly on the Human Services Committee (as Vice-Chair), the Transportation, Public Works and Independent Authorities Committee and the Intergovernmental Relations Commission.

She attended Union Hill High School and Berkeley College (Legal Secretary/Paralegal Studies).
