= Nicholas LaRocca =

American politician (1913-1999)

Nicholas J. LaRocca

Member of the New Jersey Senate from the 33rd district
- In office June 24, 1982 – January 10, 1984
- Preceded by: William Musto
- Succeeded by: Christopher Jackman

Member of the New Jersey General Assembly from the 33rd district
- In office January 10, 1984 – January 7, 1986 Serving with Robert Ranieri
- Preceded by: Thomas Gallo; Christopher Jackman
- Succeeded by: Ronald Dario; Jose Arango

Personal details
- Born: October 4, 1913 Union City, New Jersey, U.S.
- Died: August 30, 1999 (aged 85)
- Party: Democratic
- Education: Fordham College; New York University

Nicholas J. LaRocca (October 4, 1913 – August 30, 1999) was an American Democratic Party politician who served in both houses of the New Jersey Legislature from the 33rd district. He served a partial term in the New Jersey Senate succeeding his mentor William Musto and then a single term in the New Jersey General Assembly.

LaRocca lived his entire life in Union City, New Jersey, where he was born in 1913, attended the local public schools and graduated from Union Hill High School. He graduated from Fordham College in 1934 and received a law degree from New York University in 1937, before serving in the United States Army during World War II.

He worked as a legislative aide for State Senator (and Union City Mayor) William Musto at the time of Musto's removal from the Senate for his conviction on receiving kickbacks from a developer. LaRocca was essentially handpicked by Musto to be the Democratic nominee for the special election to fill the remaining 1.5 years of the Senate term. In his first bid for elected office, LaRocca defeated independent Libero Marotta, Republican Dennis Teti, and independent Carlos Munoz in a June 23, 1982, special election. In the next regular election in 1983, LaRocca and then-Assemblyman Christopher Jackman switched seats where Jackman ran for Senate and LaRocca ran for Assembly. Both won their respective races. After serving alongside Robert Ranieri for one term from the 33rd district, LaRocca did not seek reelection in 1985.

He died on August 30, 1999, aged 85.
