= William Musto =

American politician (1917–2006)

William V. Musto

Mayor of Union City, New Jersey
- In office 1962–1970
- Preceded by: Harry J. Thourot
- Succeeded by: William J. Meehan
- In office 1974 – May 10, 1982
- Preceded by: William J. Meehan
- Succeeded by: Robert C. Botti

Member of the New Jersey General Assembly from Hudson County
- In office 1947 – January 11, 1966
- Succeeded by: Multi-member district

Member of the New Jersey Senate
- In office January 11, 1966 – May 10, 1982
- Preceded by: District created
- Succeeded by: Nicholas LaRocca
- Constituency: 12th District (at-large) (1966–1974); 33rd District (1974–1982)

Personal details
- Born: William Vincent Musto; March 27, 1917 West Hoboken, New Jersey, U.S.
- Died: February 27, 2006 (aged 88) Union City, New Jersey, U.S.
- Party: Democratic
- Spouse: Rhyta Palmerini
- Occupation: Mayor, Union City, New Jersey; State Senator; State Assemblyman
- Profession: Politician

William Vincent Musto (March 27, 1917 – February 27, 2006) was an American Democratic politician who was sentenced to prison for corruption. He was the Mayor of Union City, New Jersey, from 1962 to 1970 and from 1974 to 1982. He served in the New Jersey General Assembly from 1947 to 1966 and in the New Jersey Senate from 1966 to 1982. The New York Times called him a "charismatic and visionary force" in New Jersey politics for decades.

== Early life ==
Musto was born in West Hoboken (now part of Union City) on March 27, 1917. He had a brother, Patrick Roy Musto. He graduated from Emerson High School and earned his law degree after six years of night school at John Marshall Law School (now the Seton Hall University School of Law) in Newark. He served in World War II as a Captain in the 80th Division, 315th FA, Co C (as CO), General George S. Patton's Third Army, earning a Bronze Star. He was commanding officer of an artillery battalion for four and a half years.

== Career ==
In 1946, Musto was elected to the New Jersey assembly, where he started his long political career. After three years in the assembly working alongside Jersey City Mayor Frank Hague, Musto allied himself with the John V. Kenny Victory Ticket in 1949, and by 1953 became the Democratic minority leader of the state assembly. By 1965, Musto was elected to the New Jersey State Senate. Mr. Musto is often called the Dean of the Legislature and more than once has passed up the opportunity to be Senate President. A veteran State House observer said: "Everyone loves Billy Musto in Trenton. He's extremely popular." In 1970 he lost the city election to reform candidate William Meehan, and did not return to the mayoral seat until 1974, where he served in a second, non-consecutive term until the 1982 election.

In 1972 Musto originated the North Hudson Council of Mayors, which was meant to offset Jersey City's "dominance" of county government. He is also responsible for originating the New Jersey State Lottery, and casino gambling in the area, funds from which were used for education. He is also credited with revitalizing the New Jersey Meadowlands. He was known for being an advocate of women's rights and health care reform.

== Legal troubles ==
In 1977 investigations began into the city's dealings with Rudolph Orlandini, who was hired for a $2.2 million project to construct additions on the city's two high schools at the time, Emerson High School and Union Hill High School, projects that ultimately incurred $12 million in spending. In 1979, with a trial looming, Deputy Public Works Director Bruce D. Walter and Board of Education Secretary Robert Menendez (both of whom would later serve terms as Mayor of Union City) formed the Alliance Civic Association, and publicly questioned the overrun costs on Orlandini's construction company.

In April 1981, a grand jury indicted Musto and six others on 36 counts of racketeering, extortion and fraud. They were eventually convicted of receiving hundreds of thousands of dollars in kickbacks from Orlandini, in part due to testimony by Menendez, a former aide of Musto's. Musto's conviction drew disbelief from some of his contemporaries, as well as skepticism at the validity of the accusations against him. On March 26, 1982, Musto and his co-defendants were convicted in skimming $600,000 in kickbacks from Orlandini contracts for the school construction projects. Musto was sentenced to seven years in prison.

Despite his legal troubles, Musto still managed to maintain his adoration from Union City and continued his 1982 reelection campaign for the city commission, winning the election against Menendez on May 11, 1982, the day after his sentencing. The courts forced him from office, and his wife, Rhyta, won her husband's seat in a special election. He was succeeded in the New Jersey Senate by Christopher Jackman. After two years of appeals, Musto began serving his prison sentence in 1984 on a reduced sentence of five years. During the May 13, 1984, election, Commissioner Rhyta Musto was part of the incumbent Union City Together ticket. It was beaten by rival Menendez's Alliance Civic Association ticket, which won 57% of the vote, effectively doing away with the remnants of William Musto's political machine.

After serving three and a half years, Musto was granted early parole to a Manhattan halfway house in 1987, where he stayed for two months.

== Personal life, retirement and death ==
In 1941, Musto met his future wife Rhyta Palmerini, a medical technician at a Trenton hospital who hailed from Waterbury, Connecticut, at Fort Dix, when he was an artillery officer who was soon to ship out to war. They corresponded by mail throughout the war until he returned with a Bronze Star. They married in 1946, the same year he was elected to the state Assembly. They and their children, Patrick and Patricia, lived at 321 23rd Street in Union City.

Musto retired from the public eye following his release, and continued to proclaim his innocence for the rest of his life. In his free time, he was a member of the American Legion and VFW, as well as a member of The Elks. He also served as Honorary Chairman of the American Red Cross, North Hudson Chapter.

Musto died on February 27, 2006, at the age of 88 from complications of Alzheimer's disease. He was buried in Fairview Cemetery. Rhyta died December 20, 2017, at the age of 96.

== Legacy ==
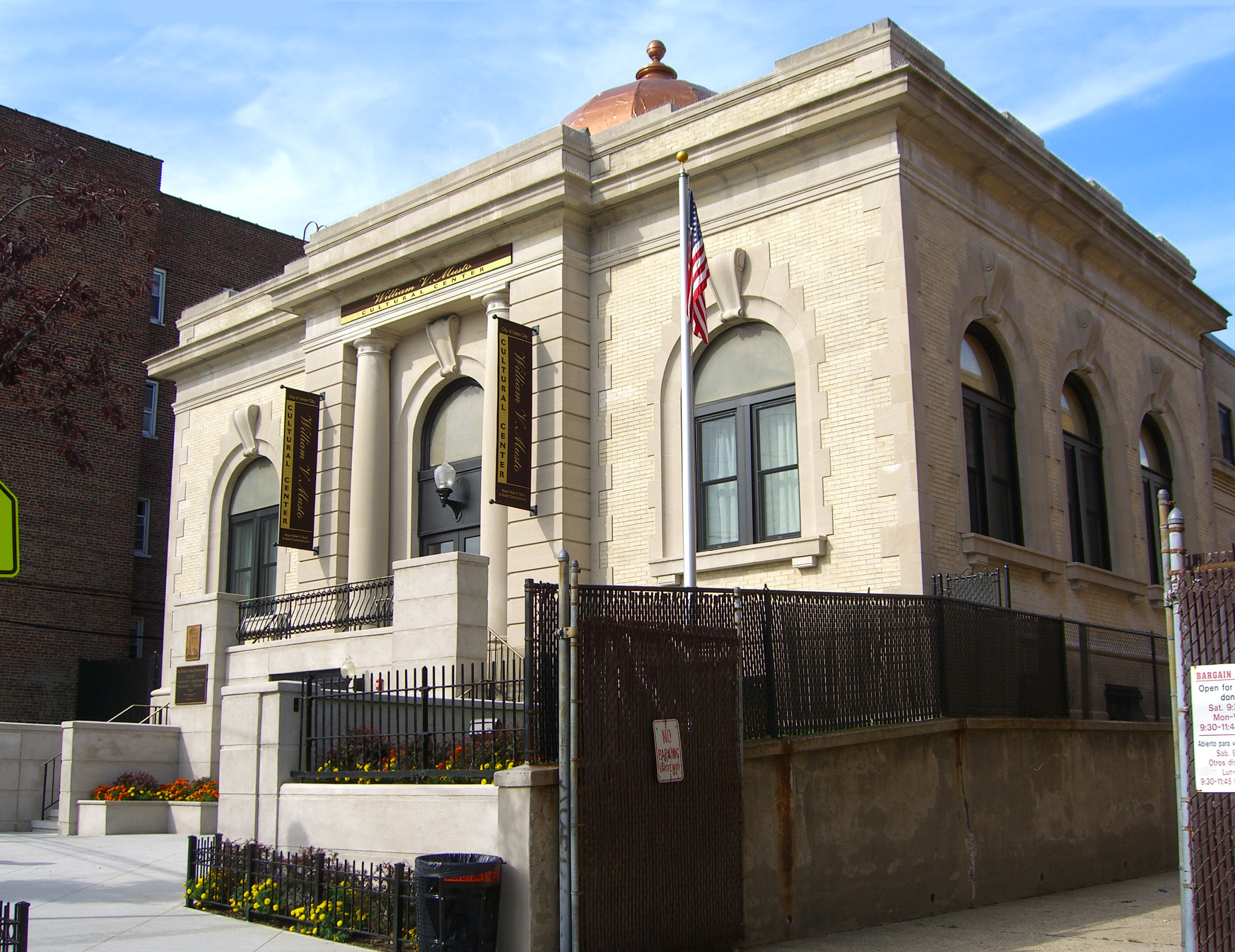
The William V. Musto Cultural Center opened on June 18, 2011.

On June 18, 2011, Union City honored Musto by opening the William V. Musto Cultural Center, which houses the Union City Museum of History, art galleries, and rooms for senior citizen activities. The center is housed in the former public library on 15th Street, which was originally built by Cranwell family of builders in 1903, with funds donated by Andrew Carnegie. The naming of the center drew criticism from Michael Drewniak, a spokesman for Governor Chris Christie, who questioned the appropriateness of honoring a convicted felon, but Union City Mayor Brian P. Stack, who began volunteering on Musto campaigns as a young boy, and was present at age 16 at Musto's sentencing, pushed to name the building after his former mentor, and defended the decision by praising Musto's fairness toward rich and poor alike, and his generosity in helping those in need. Stack commented, "He changed the physical and political landscape of the state. He created the Meadowlands Racetrack, was the father of casino gambling in Atlantic City, he single-handedly created the (political) career of former U.S. Sen. Bill Bradley. [At his sentencing], the judge said a lifetime of good is not wiped out by one wrong." James Plaisted, the lead prosecutor in the 1982 case, agreed with Stack, saying, "The senator dedicated his life to public service for his community over many decades. Those good works over such a long period of time should be recognized."

In 2014 Musto was ranked #15 in NJ.com's list of the "15 Most Corrupt Politicians in N.J. History".
