= Jose Arango =

American politician (born 1957)

Member of the New Jersey General Assembly from the 33rd district
- In office January 10, 1986 – January 14, 1988 Serving with Ronald Dario
- Preceded by: Nicholas LaRocca; Robert Ranieri
- Succeeded by: Bernard Kenny; Bob Menendez

Personal details
- Born: October 11, 1957 (age 69) Havana, Cuba
- Party: Republican

Jose O. Arango (born October 11, 1957) is an American Republican Party politician who represented the 33rd district in the New Jersey General Assembly from 1986 to 1988. He has served as the chair of the Hudson County Republican Organization since 2000.

As of 2021, Arango was employed by Jersey City as the director of economic development, a position he had held since 1998.

== Early life ==
Jose Arango was born in Havana, Cuba on October 11, 1957. His parents were from Asturias, Spain, and the family returned to Oviedo in 1963 or 1964. In 1973, the family came to West New York, New Jersey, where he graduated from Memorial High School.

As a senior advisor to Jersey City mayor Bret Schundler in 1998, Arango arranged for sister city status between Jersey City and Oviedo, as well as Dublin, which he attributed to the city's large Irish American population.

== Political career ==
=== New Jersey General Assembly ===
Riding Thomas Kean's coattails in the 1985 elections, Arango and Ronald Dario of Union City defeated Democratic incumbent Robert Ranieri and newcomer Mario R. Hernandez. In the elections, Republicans won four Assembly seats in the usually Democratic Hudson County. Running for re-election in 1987, Arango and newcomer Angelo M. Valente of Hoboken were defeated by Democrats Bernard Kenny and Bob Menendez.

In 1988, Arango ran for North Bergen township commission on a slate that included former county Republican chairman Lee Lichtenberger. They were badly beaten by slate supporting incumbent mayor Nicholas Sacco.

=== Hudson County Republican chair ===
In 1989, Arango was elected as chair of the Hudson County Republican Organization and served into the 1990s.

He was elected chair again in 2000 or 2002 and has served in that position since. He was re-elected with 98 percent of the vote in 2021 against Joshua Sotomayor Einstein, whom Arango had pressured to resign from the county committee after Einstein publicly admitted to emotionally abusing women. The challenge was delayed by Arango's decision to reschedule committee elections from June 2020 to 2021, citing the COVID-19 pandemic. Arango was re-elected without opposition in 2024. As of 2025, he was the longest serving county party chair in the state. From 2014 to 2018 and again since 2020, Arango has also served as chairman of the New Jersey Republican Chairs Association, a group of county chairs from throughout the state, expanding his influence in the state.

He has also been an influential leader in the New Jersey Hispanic community outside of Hudson County.

=== Political positions and endorsements ===
As a county Republican chair in the large, urban county, Arango represents around 3 percent of the statewide Republican Party primary electorate, and until 2024, he personally controlled the powerful county line in primary elections, making his endorsement influential in New Jersey Republican politics. Because Hudson County is overwhelmingly Democratic, Arango has focused on endorsing non-partisan moderates in local races, and the margin of Republican defeat in Hudson County can determine statewide general election results.

In 2018, Arango criticized a proposed constitutional amendment that would tie legislative redistricting to partisan performance in statewide elections. He argued that the amendment would diminish minority representation and focus on local issues.

In 2019, Arango and the Republican organization withdrew support for sheriff nominee Adela Rohena after she made disparaging remarks about Pride Month. She agreed to drop out of the race, and Arango endorsed Democratic incumbent Frank Schillari. Arango issued a public statement saying, "I have been consistent as Republican chairman in support of LGBT rights even when the party wasn't as enlightened on this issue. I will not support my candidates making homophobic remarks. Adela understands that and therefore will no longer be our candidate."

In 2020, Arango supported Stuart Meissner for U.S. Senate before switching his endorsement to Rik Mehta after Meissner withdrew.

In 2020, Arango and other New Jersey Republican county chairs called for supporters to vote against a ballot measure legalizing recreational marijuana. He opposed a proposal by U.S. senator Mitch McConnell to allow states to declare bankruptcy, arguing for a "middle path" which would tie future federal aid grants to state economic reforms.

== Personal life ==
In 2015, Arango was charged with driving while intoxicated after police noticed that he was driving without headlights on and swerving.
