= David Walsh (basketball) =

American basketball referee (1889–1975)

David H. Walsh (October 5, 1889 – June 2, 1975) was an American basketball referee.

He was born in Hoboken, New Jersey. As an adult, he weighed 165 pounds (75 kg) and was 5 feet 11 inches (1.80 m) tall. He graduated from Hoboken High School in 1907, Montclair Teachers College (now Montclair State University) in 1911, and the Sargent School of Physical Education in 1914.

He began officiating in 1911, starting at high schools and working his way up until he was ranked one of the top six referees in the Eastern seaboard. He also co-authored the first Manual of Basketball Officiating.

He was inducted into the Basketball Hall of Fame in 1961 as a referee.
