= Ronald Dario =

American politician

Member of the New Jersey General Assembly from the 33rd district
- In office January 10, 1986 – January 14, 1988 Serving with Jose Arango
- Preceded by: Nicholas LaRocca; Robert Ranieri
- Succeeded by: Bernard Kenny; Bob Menendez

Personal details
- Born: 1937
- Died: June 30, 2004 (aged 66–67) Lakewood Township, New Jersey
- Party: Republican
- Spouse: Claire Mastropierro

Ronald A. Dario (1937 – June 30, 2004) was a Republican Party politician who represented the 33rd Legislative District in the New Jersey General Assembly from 1984 to 1986 and served as a Commissioner in Union City, New Jersey.

== Early life and education ==
Raised in Hoboken, he played prep baseball, basketball and football at A. J. Demarest High School (since renamed as Hoboken High School) and attended Wagner College, where he competed for four seasons on the Wagner Seahawks men's basketball team.

== Political career ==
After moving to Union City, New Jersey in 1960, he connected with William Musto, who was mayor of Union City and represented the district in the New Jersey Senate. In 1974, Dario ran as part of Musto's successful Your Operation Uplift campaign for Union City Commissioners, together with a slate that included Bob Menendez. Dario had won two terms on the Union City Commission, but by 1982 he had broken away from Musto after he had been indicted, and ultimately convicted, on corruption charges. Dario and other former Musto supporters ran as part of an Alliance Civic Association slate that lost the 1982 elections. After the slate won the 1986 election with support from the Republican Party, Dario had expected to be chosen as mayor but the Menendez was able to obtain the votes from his running mates that he needed to be elected mayor at the July 1 reorganization meeting. Dario split from Menendez and lost his bid for re-election in 1990.

In the 1985 general election, representatives of the Thomas Kean campaign for Governor of New Jersey encouraged Dario to run together with Jose Arango as the Republican candidates for the two General Assembly seats in the 33rd Legislative District. In defeating incumbent Robert Ranieri and newcomer Mario R. Hernandez, the two Republican victors were among a group of four who were the first to represent the county in the State Assembly in more than 60 years.

In his single two-year term in the Assembly, Dario was a co-sponsor of legislation that provided aided to struggling cities, that led to the state takeover of the Jersey City Public Schools and that prohibited warehousing of apartments in pending condominium conversions. Dario was co-sponsor of a bill that would mandate that a majority of tenants in an apartment building that is undergoing a conversion to condominiums, ending a system in which such conversions can be implemented without any say by existing tenants.

== Election results ==
New Jersey general election, 1985
Party	Candidate	Votes	%	±%
Republican	Ronald A. Dario	20,422	27.9	▲10.0
Republican	Jose O. Arango	19,748	26.9	▲9.7
Democratic	Robert A. Ranieri	17,443	23.8	▼8.9
Democratic	Mario R. Hernandez	15,671	21.4	▼10.8
Total votes		'73,284'	'100.0'	

== Death ==
A resident of Manchester Township, Dario died on June 30, 2004, at Paul Kimball Hospital (since renamed as Monmouth Medical Center Southern Campus) in Lakewood Township, New Jersey.
