= Rudy Garcia (New Jersey politician) =

American politician (born 1964)

Member of the New Jersey General Assembly from the 33rd district
- In office January 25, 1993 – January 8, 2000
- Preceded by: Bernard Kenny
- Succeeded by: Rafael Fraguela

Mayor of Union City, New Jersey
- In office 1998–2000
- Preceded by: Bruce D. Walter
- Succeeded by: Brian P. Stack

Personal details
- Born: January 20, 1964 (age 62) Cuba
- Party: Democratic
- Education: Columbia University (BA); New York University (JD)

Raul "Rudy" Garcia (born January 20, 1964) is an American Democratic Party politician who served in the New Jersey General Assembly from 1993 to 2000, where he represented the 33rd Legislative District. He also served as the mayor of Union City.

== Early life ==
Garcia was born in Cuba, and emigrated to the United States with his mother and brothers when he was four-years old. He grew up in Union City and attended Union Hill High School, where he was the captain of the football team, earning all-State honors at both linebacker and running back, as well as winning three state championships. He continued playing football for the Columbia Lions football team.

Garcia earned his undergraduate degree from Columbia University with a major in Economics and received his J.D. degree from New York University School of Law. After finishing law school, he took a position as an associate at the firm of Lord Day & Lord, Barrett Smith.

== Career ==
Garcia later became an attorney with the firm of Nelson, Walrod and Garcia.

After Bob Menendez was elected as U.S. Representative in November 1992, Assemblymember Bernard Kenny was chosen to fill Menendez's vacancy in the New Jersey Senate. In turn, Hudson County, New Jersey Democratic Party boss Bruce Walter picked Garcia in January 1993 to fill Kenny's now-vacant spot in the Assembly. Garcia won election for his first full term the Assembly in November 1993, together with his running mate Louis Romano. Garcia won re-election together with Romano in 1995 and 1997, and was re-elected with Albio Sires in 1999. In the Assembly, Garcia served as Associate Minority Leader starting in 1998, and served on the Banking and Insurance Committee and the Education Committee. Garcia did not run for re-election to the Assembly in November 2000, and his seat was taken by fellow Democrat Rafael Fraguela.

After Bruce Walter died in 1998, Garcia was named to fill his vacancy on the Union City Board of Commissioners, and was selected by the members of the board to serve as mayor. At the city's July 2000 reorganization meeting, Garcia was removed from his position as commissioner responsible for public safety and recreation, in the wake of a recall election petition that had garnered at least 6,700 signatures. Garcia resigned from his post as mayor in October 2000 and was replaced by Brian Stack.
