= Thomas Gallo (politician) =

American politician

Member of the New Jersey General Assembly from the 33rd district
- In office January 8, 1974 – January 10, 1984
- Preceded by: District created
- Succeeded by: Nicholas LaRocca; Robert Ranieri

Member of the New Jersey General Assembly from the 12-C district
- In office January 15, 1973 – January 8, 1974
- Preceded by: Silvio Failla
- Succeeded by: District eliminated

Personal details
- Born: December 5, 1914 Hoboken, New Jersey
- Died: December 9, 1994 (aged 80) Neptune Township, New Jersey
- Party: Democratic
- Spouse: Adelaide Witt
- Children: 4
- Education: Seth Boyden School of Business

Thomas A. Gallo (December 5, 1914 – December 9, 1994) was an American Democratic Party politician who served 11 years in the New Jersey General Assembly from Hoboken.

== Biography ==
Gallo was born on December 5, 1914, in Hoboken. He graduated from Demarest High School (Now Hoboken High School) and the Seth Boyden School of Business (later merged into the University of Newark and now part of Rutgers University–Newark). He served on the Hoboken Board of Adjustment and in 1951 was elected to the Hoboken City Commission and served for two years. After a change in the city's form of government, he returned to the city council in 1965 and was the council president until February 1973, shortly after being seated in the Assembly. While in the Assembly, he was the secretary to the Hoboken Board of Education, a position he held until 1979. He was married to the former Adelaide Witt and had a total of four children.

In September 1972, District 12-C Assemblyman Silvio Failla was murdered in a robbery, leaving one seat vacant. Gallo ran as a Democrat first in the December 18, 1972, special primary election; he was successful against four other Democrats. In the January 8, 1973, special election, he ran against Republican Nilo Juri and defeated him. The next year, Gallo ran in the new 33rd district alongside Christopher Jackman. The two men would be elected to the General Assembly for the next five terms from the same district until Gallo retired prior to the 1983 elections.

A life-long resident of Hoboken, he died at Jersey Shore Medical Center in Neptune Township, New Jersey, on December 9, 1994, shortly after turning 80 years old. He was survived by his wife and children.
