= Christopher Jackman =

American politician

Christopher J. Jackman

Member of the New Jersey Senate from the 33rd district
- In office 1987–1991
- Preceded by: Nicholas LaRocca
- Succeeded by: Bob Menendez

160th Speaker of the New Jersey General Assembly
- In office 1978–1982
- Preceded by: William J. Hamilton
- Succeeded by: Alan Karcher

Member of the New Jersey General Assembly
- In office 1968–1984
- Preceded by: Constituency established
- Succeeded by: Nicholas LaRocca; Robert Rainieri
- Constituency: District 12C (1968–70); District 12D (1970–72); District 12C (1972–74); 33rd district (1974–84)

Personal details
- Born: July 12, 1916 New York City, New York
- Died: January 28, 1991 (aged 74) Newark, New Jersey
- Party: Democratic Party

Christopher J. Jackman (July 12, 1916 – January 28, 1991) was an American labor organizer and Democratic Party politician from West New York, New Jersey, who served in both houses of the New Jersey Legislature. He was Speaker of the New Jersey General Assembly from 1978 until 1982.

== Life and career ==
Jackman was born in New York City in 1916. He attended public schools in West New York, New Jersey and took labor classes at Rutgers University and Cornell University. A longtime labor advocate, he became vice-president of the International Brotherhood of Pulp, Sulphite, and Paper Mill Workers and its successor, the United Paperworkers International Union. He sat on the executive board of the New Jersey AFL-CIO.

Jackman was chairman of the West New York Housing Authority from 1952 to 1959. He was elected to the New Jersey General Assembly from Hudson County in 1967. He became majority leader in 1977 and speaker in 1978, serving in the latter position until 1982 when he was replaced by Alan Karcher. He was a delegate to the 1980 Democratic National Convention.

In 1983, Jackman was elected to the New Jersey Senate, following the conviction of William Musto on racketeering charges. He was reelected in 1987 and became deputy majority leader. In 1991 he died of cancer at The University Hospital in Newark, New Jersey. Bob Menendez, then serving in the Assembly, was appointed to fill the vacant seat in March 1991 and was elected to a full term the following November.

New Jersey General Assembly
Preceded by Constituency established	Member of the New Jersey General Assembly from the 12C district 1968–1970; Served alongside: Michael P. Esposito	Succeeded by Frank R. Conwell
Preceded by Theodore DiGiammo; Norman A. Doyle, Jr.	Member of the New Jersey General Assembly from the 12D district 1970–1972; Served alongside: Joseph M. Healey	Succeeded by Constituency abolished
Preceded by Frank R. Conwell; Michael P. Esposito	Member of the New Jersey General Assembly from the 12C district 1972–1974; Served alongside: Silvio Failla, Thomas Gallo	Succeeded by Constituency abolished
Preceded by Constituency established	Member of the New Jersey General Assembly from the 33rd district 1974–1984; Served alongside: Thomas Gallo	Succeeded by Nicholas LaRocca; Robert Ranieri
New Jersey Senate
Preceded by Nicholas LaRocca	Member of the New Jersey Senate from the 33rd district 1984–1991	Succeeded by Bob Menendez
Political offices
Preceded by William J. Hamilton	Speaker of the New Jersey General Assembly; 1978–1982	Succeeded by Alan Karcher
