= August William Hutaf =

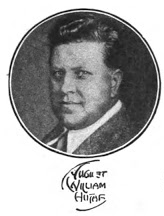
- Born: February 25, 1874; Hoboken, New Jersey
- Died: October 28, 1942 (aged 63); Hoboken, New Jersey
- Known for: Advertisements, illustrations, sculpture, and murals
- Notable work: "Treat 'Em Rough! Join the Tanks" (1917)
- Style: Realism, Naturalism
- Movement: Arts and Crafts
- Website: http://www.hutaf.com/

August "Gus" William Hutaf (1874–1942) was an illustrator, commercial artist, and advertising executive during the 1900s. His most recognized work is the 1917 World War I recruiting poster for the Tank Corps titled, "Treat 'Em Rough! Join the Tanks!"

== Personal life ==
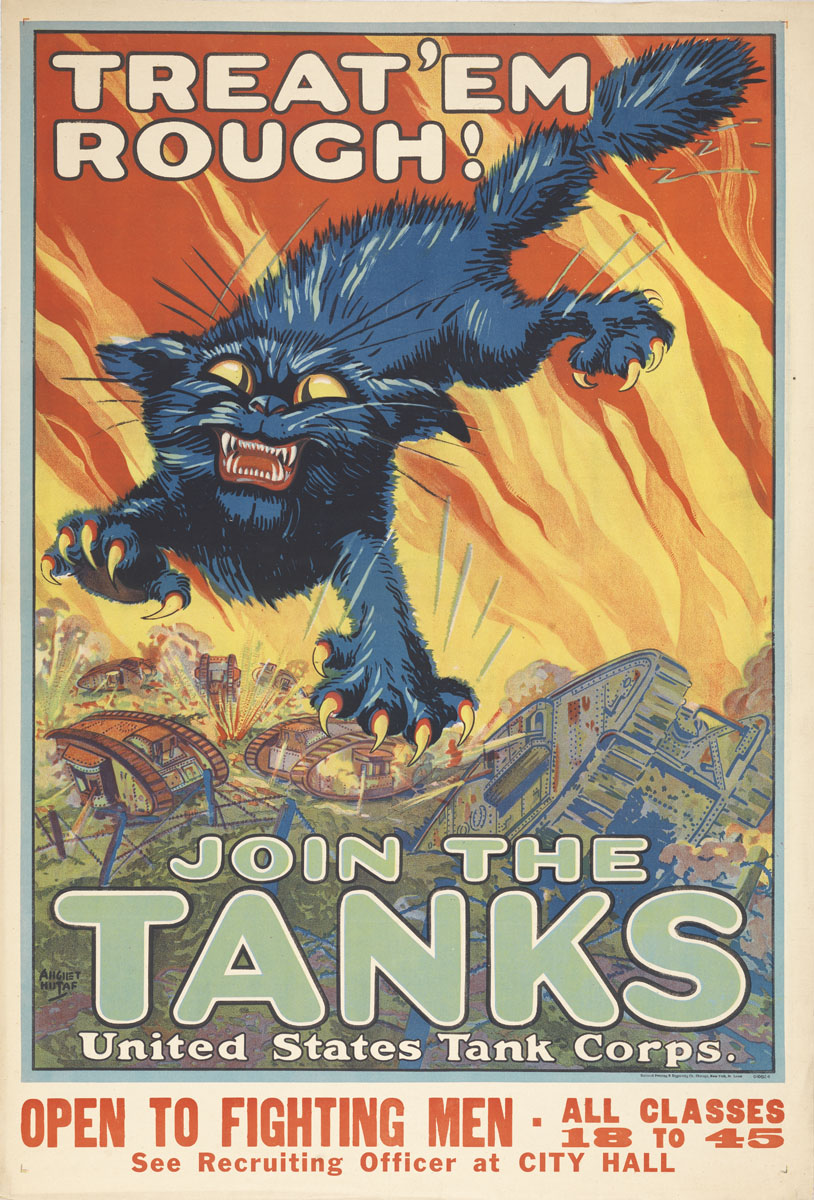
"Treat 'Em Rough!" (1917) Illustrated by Hutaf

Hutaf was born on February 25 in Hoboken, New Jersey. His year of birth has been listed as being either 1874 or 1879. In adulthood, Hutaf stood at 6 foot 4 inches and weighed more than 300 pounds. He and his wife Lil had no children.

During his career, Hutaf was friends with writers Christopher Morley, Ogden Nash, and Robert Benchley.

He died on October 28, 1942, in Hoboken.

== Career ==
Hutaf was an advertising executive and held positions at various companies as an art director.

In 1914, he resigned as art director of the United States Printing and Lithographing Company to become art director of the A.M. Briggs Company. In this position he was in charge of prepping posters and handling selling plans for advertisers. In 1921, Hutaf was listed as the former vice president of Einson Litho, Inc., and former art director of the United States Lithograph Company of the William H. Rankin Company. He was also associated with the outdoor advertising company, Ivan B. Nordhem of New York.

In 1908, two Leap Year postcard sets designed by Hutaf were released by Paul C. Koeber and Illustrated Postcard Co.

In 1916, Hutaf was awarded $1,000 by the Poster Advertising Association for the best poster to advertise poster advertising. His design featured a waterfall with gold and purple mountains in the background. A rainbow and "Niagara-green" silhouette is in the foreground. Its purpose was to symbolize the "beauty, power, and impressiveness' of poster advertising.

In 1917, Hutaf illustrated a recruitment poster for WWI Tank Corps. It encouraged men to join the Tank Corps, which was a relatively new unit at the time. In this same year, Hutaf was elected to be a member of the American Press Humorists Association.

Hutaf served as the chairman of the poster committee in the First Annual Exhibition of Advertising Paintings and Drawings of the Art Directors Club.

Throughout his career, Hutaf created artwork for postcards, theatre programs, sheet music, book illustrations, and national advertisements. The subjects for most of his art were children, as evidenced in his series of postcards, "Candy Kids," "Little Hayseeds," and "Blacktown Babies." Hutaf, inspired by his nephew playing in the snow, designed the Jack Frost Sugar logo. Beyond illustrations and paintings, he also designed mission pottery that captured the colors and scenery of California.

Hutaf painted a mural at the 1939 New York World's Fair.
