= Sean Connors =

American politician (born 1969)

Member of the New Jersey General Assembly from the 33rd Legislative District district
- In office January 8, 2012 – January 14, 2014
- Preceded by: Caridad Rodriguez
- Succeeded by: Raj Mukherji

Personal details
- Born: February 5, 1969 (age 57)
- Party: Democratic
- Occupation: Police detective
- Profession: Politician
- Website: Legislative web page

Sean Connors (born February 5, 1969) is an American Democratic Party politician, who served one term in the New Jersey General Assembly from 2012 to 2014, where he represented the 33rd Legislative District. Connors served in the Assembly on the Consumer Affairs Law Committee and the Public Safety Committee.

Born at Margaret Hague Maternity Hospital in Jersey City, Connors lives in the city's Jersey City Heights neighborhood. He attended Hudson County Community College after his graduation from Hudson Catholic Regional High School. Connors is a Detective serving with the Jersey City Police Department, having achieved the rank in 2002 after joining the department in 1994. From 2009 to 2012, he served on the board of education of the Jersey City Public Schools.
