= Hoboken Public Schools =

School district in New Jersey, United States

Address
- 1115 Clinton Street Hoboken, Hudson County, New Jersey, 07030; United States
- Coordinates: 40.75089°N 74.031392°W

District information
- Grades: PreK-12
- Superintendent: Christine Johnson
- Business administrator: Joyce A. Goode
- Schools: 5
- Affiliation: Former Abbott district

Students and staff
- Enrollment: 3,531 (as of 2023–24)
- Faculty: 240.0 FTEs
- Student–teacher ratio: 14.7:1

Other information
- District Factor Group: FG
- Website: www.hoboken.k12.nj.us
Ind.	Per pupil	District spending	Rank (*)	K-12 average	%± vs. average
1A	Total Spending	$25,371	67	$18,891	34.3%
1	Budgetary Cost	21,171	67	14,783	43.2%
2	Classroom Instruction	10,697	65	8,763	22.1%
6	Support Services	4,791	67	2,392	100.3%
8	Administrative Cost	1,681	51	1,485	13.2%
10	Operations & Maintenance	3,040	67	1,783	70.5%
13	Extracurricular Activities	733	68	268	173.5%
16	Median Teacher Salary	71,170	61	64,043
Data from NJDoE 2014 Taxpayers' Guide to Education Spending. *Of K-12 districts with 1,800-3,500 students. Lowest spending=1; Highest=68

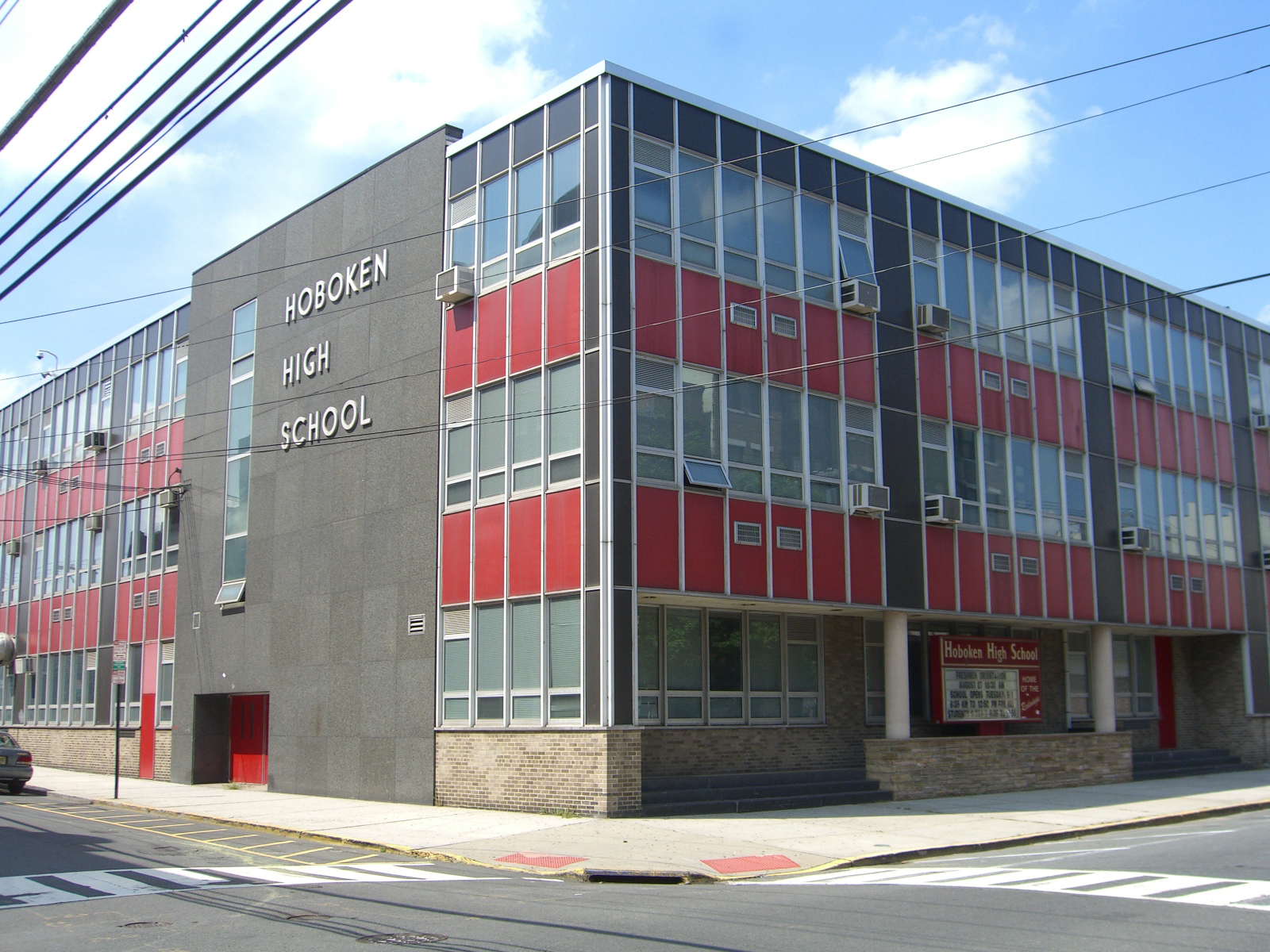
Hoboken High School

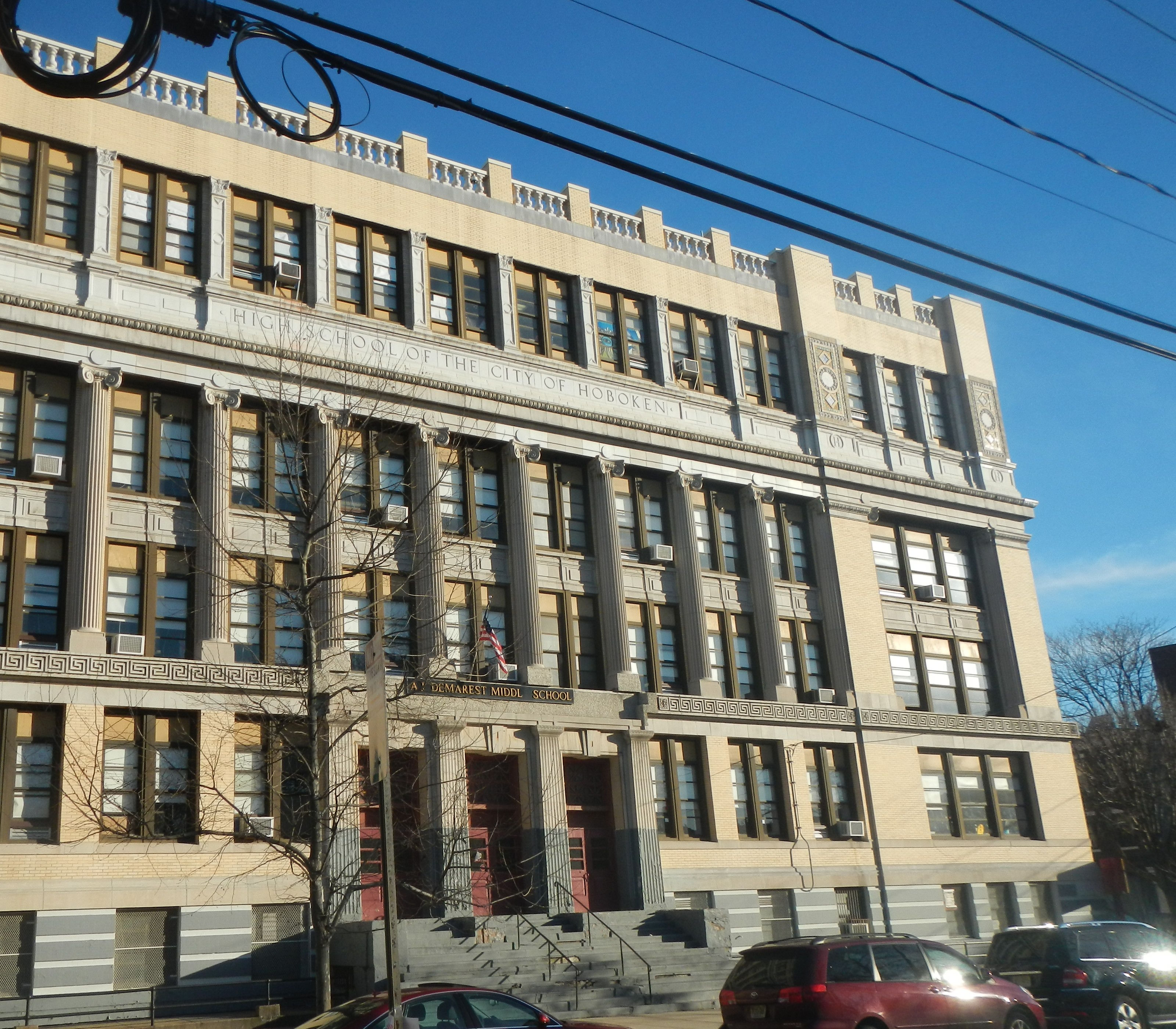
AJ Demarest Middle School

Hoboken Public Schools is a comprehensive community public school district that serves children in pre-kindergarten through twelfth grade in Hoboken, in Hudson County, in the U.S. state of New Jersey. The district is one of 31 former Abbott districts statewide that were established pursuant to the decision by the New Jersey Supreme Court in Abbott v. Burke which are now referred to as "SDA Districts" based on the requirement for the state to cover all costs for school building and renovation projects in these districts under the supervision of the New Jersey Schools Development Authority.

As of the 2023–24 school year, the district, comprising five schools, had an enrollment of 3,531 students and 240.0 classroom teachers (on an FTE basis), for a student–teacher ratio of 14.7:1.

The district participates in the Interdistrict Public School Choice Program, having been approved on November 2, 1999, as one of the first ten districts statewide to participate in the program, which allows non-resident students to attend school in the district at no cost to their parents, with tuition covered by the resident district. Available slots are announced annually by grade.

== History ==
Former schools include Joseph F. Brandt Middle School and A.J. DeMarest Middle School.

The district had been classified by the New Jersey Department of Education as being in District Factor Group "FG", the fourth-highest of eight groupings. District Factor Groups organize districts statewide to allow comparison by common socioeconomic characteristics of the local districts. From lowest socioeconomic status to highest, the categories are A, B, CD, DE, FG, GH, I and J.

== Schools ==
Schools in the district (with 2023–24 enrollment data from the National Center for Education Statistics) are:

Elementary schools

- Joseph F. Brandt Elementary School with 611 students in grades K–5
  - Charles Bartlett, principal
- Thomas G. Connors Elementary School with 328 students in grades K–5
  - Juliana Addi, principal
- Wallace Elementary School with 594 students in grades PreK–5
  - Martin Shannon, principal

Middle school

- Hoboken Middle School with 432 students in grades 6–8
  - Ryan Sorafine, principal

High school

- Hoboken High School with 607 students in grades 9–12
  - Robin Piccapietra, principal

== Administration ==
Core members of the district's administration are:

- Christine Johnson, superintendent
- Joyce A. Goode, business administrator and board secretary

== Board of education ==
The district's board of education, consisting of nine members, sets policy and oversees the fiscal and educational operation of the district through its administration. As a Type II school district, the board's trustees are elected directly by voters to serve three-year terms of office on a staggered basis, with three seats up for election each year held (since 2012) as part of the November general election. The board appoints a superintendent to oversee the district's day-to-day operations and a business administrator to supervise the business functions of the district.
