= Bernard Kenny =

American politician (born 1946)

President of the New Jersey Senate
- In office January 7, 2008 – January 8, 2008
- Preceded by: Richard Codey
- Succeeded by: Richard Codey

Majority Leader of the New Jersey Senate
- In office January 8, 2002 – January 7, 2008
- Preceded by: John O. Bennett
- Succeeded by: Stephen Sweeney

Member of the New Jersey Senate from the 33rd district
- In office January 25, 1993 – January 8, 2008
- Preceded by: Robert Menendez
- Succeeded by: Brian P. Stack

Member of the New Jersey General Assembly from the 33rd district
- In office January 12, 1988 – January 25, 1993
- Preceded by: Jose Arango; Ronald Dario
- Succeeded by: Rudy Garcia

Personal details
- Born: November 17, 1946 (age 79) Jersey City, New Jersey, U.S.
- Party: Democratic
- Education: University of Pennsylvania (BA); Fordham University (JD)

Military service
- Allegiance: United States
- Branch/service: United States Navy
- Years of service: 1968–1971

Bernard F. Kenny Jr. (born November 17, 1946, in Jersey City, New Jersey) is an American Democratic Party politician, who represented the 33rd Legislative District in the New Jersey State Senate from 1993 to 2008, after serving in the New Jersey General Assembly from 1988 to 1993. He served for one day at the end of his tenure in the Senate as President of the Senate.

== Early life ==
Kenny attended Delbarton School, received a B.A. from the University of Pennsylvania (1968) in Economics and was awarded a J.D. (1976) from the Fordham University School of Law.

== Career ==
In 1980, Kenny served as a delegate to the Democratic National Convention supporting Ted Kennedy against incumbent president Jimmy Carter.

Before moving up to the Senate, Kenny served in the lower house of the New Jersey Legislature, the General Assembly, from 1987 to 1993. Upon the resignation of Bob Menendez from the New Jersey Senate, due to his election to the United States House of Representatives, Kenny was selected to fill the vacancy.

A Navy veteran, Senator Kenny is a partner at the law firm of Florio Kenny Raval, LLP. When the Senate was tied 20–20 in 2002 to 2003, Kenny served as the Democratic Majority Leader, and when the Democrats regained majority control, he took over as full Majority Leader, a position he held for the remainder of his Senate term, except for his last day in office when he became President of the Senate.

Senator Kenny was the chairman of the Budget and Appropriation Committee in 2008, and also served on the Joint Budget Oversight Committee, the Joint Legislative Committee on Ethical Standards, the Intergovernmental Relations Commission and the Legislative Services Commission.

Kenny was Hoboken's Assistant Corporation Counsel from 1984 to 1985 and was an Assistant Prosecutor in Hudson County from 1976 to 1979. Kenny served in the United States Navy from 1968 to 1971 as a Lieutenant, junior grade.

In the Senate, two laws Kenny sponsored, the Water Supply Public/Private Contracting Act and the County and Municipal Water Supply Act, make it possible for municipalities to enter into public/private water utility agreements. He sponsored the legislation which conforms the State's trademark law and application procedures with federal law. He also sponsored a law providing for interstate banking and a law giving gross income exclusions for certain savings in Roth IRAs.

Kenny was one of New Jersey's presidential electors casting the state's Electoral College votes after the 2004 presidential election. New Jersey's electors cast their ballots on December 13, 2004, in the State House Annex, in Trenton, where all 15 votes were cast for the Democratic Party candidate John Kerry.

Kenny was a member of the New Jersey Sports History Commission and served on the New Jersey Council for the Humanities.

From 1983 to 1987, Mr. Kenny was counsel to the state division of the American Cancer Society. He served, at the appointment of the New Jersey Supreme Court, on the District VI Ethics Committee which reviewed complaints against lawyers, from 1985 to 1988.

=== Senate Presidency ===
To honor Kenny, Senate President Richard Codey resigned his position on January 7, 2008, for the last day of Kenny's term, which ended January 8, 2008, and allowed Kenny to be elected President of the New Jersey Senate for one day. As Senate President, Kenny presided over Senate sessions, set the Senate agenda, and performed ceremonial functions on behalf of the Senate. If Gov. Jon Corzine had left the state or been incapacitated during Kenny's Senate Presidency, Kenny would have served as acting governor.

=== District 33 ===
Each of the forty districts in the New Jersey Legislature has one representative in the New Jersey Senate and two members in the New Jersey General Assembly. The other representatives from the 33rd Legislative District are:

- Assemblyman Brian P. Stack
- Assemblyman Silverio Vega

Political offices
Preceded by Robert Menendez	New Jersey State Senator from District 33; 1993–2008	Succeeded by Brian Stack
Preceded by John O. Bennett	Majority Leader of the New Jersey State Senate; January 8, 2002–January 7, 2008	Succeeded by Stephen Sweeney
Preceded by Wayne Bryant	Chairman of the Senate Budget and Appropriations Committee; 2007–2008	Succeeded by Barbara Buono
Preceded by Richard Codey	President of the New Jersey State Senate; January 7, 2008–January 8, 2008	Succeeded by Richard Codey
