= New Jersey's 33rd legislative district =

American legislative district

- Senator: Brian P. Stack (D)
- Assembly members: Gabe Rodriguez (D); Larry Wainstein (D)
- Registration: 55.4% Democratic; 11.0% Republican; 32.4% unaffiliated
- Demographics: 40.2% White; 5.4% Black/African American; 1.0% Native American; 17.7% Asian; 0.1% Hawaiian/Pacific Islander; 21.5% Other race; 14.1% Two or more races; 39.9% Hispanic
- Population: 249,706
- Voting-age population: 203,973
- Registered voters: 123,298

New Jersey's 33rd legislative district is one of 40 in the state, covering the Hudson County municipalities of Guttenberg, North Bergen, Secaucus, Union City, Weehawken and West New York.

== Demographic characteristics ==
As of the 2020 United States census, the district had a population of 249,706, of whom 203,973 (81.7%) were of voting age. The racial makeup of the district was 100,428 (40.2%) White, 13,401 (5.4%) African American, 2,617 (1.0%) Native American, 44,188 (17.7%) Asian, 148 (0.1%) Pacific Islander, 53,709 (21.5%) from some other race, and 35,215 (14.1%) from two or more races. Hispanic or Latino of any race were 99,722 (39.9%) of the population.

The district had 123,298 registered voters as of December 1, 2023, of whom 71,353 (57.9%) were registered as Democrats, 36,107 (29.3%) were registered as unaffiliated, 14,314 (11.6%) were registered as Republicans, and 1,524 (1.2%) were registered to other parties.

The district is the smallest and most densely populated district in the state. The district has a majority Hispanic population, with 46% of the population being foreign-born, the largest of any district. It has a relative paucity of African Americans and senior citizens.

== Political representation ==
For the 2026–2027 session, the 33rd legislative district of the New Jersey Legislature is represented in the State Senate by Brian P. Stack (D, Union City) and in the General Assembly by Gabe Rodriguez (D, West New York) and Larry Wainstein (D, North Bergen).

The legislative district is entirely located within New Jersey's 8th congressional district.

== Apportionment history ==
The 33rd district, since its creation in 1973 along with the 40-district legislative map in the state, has always consisted of most of the municipalities in North Hudson along the Hudson River. From 1973 until 2011, it consisted of all of Hoboken, Union City, Weehawken, West New York, and Guttenberg, and a portion of Jersey City. In order to maintain a population close to one-fortieth of the state's population, wards from Jersey City were added and removed as necessary to obtain this population count.

Guttenberg and West New York, which had been in the district since 1973, were shifted to the 32nd district in 2011.

The 33rd district has been reliably Democratic for decades, with Republicans making brief inroads in the 1985 elections. Riding Governor of New Jersey Thomas Kean's wave of success in the 1985 elections, two Republicans won election, Jose Arango of West New York and Ronald Dario of Union City. The two defeated Democratic incumbents Robert Ranieri and newcomer Mario R. Hernandez.

Bob Menendez was elevated to fill the Senate vacancy following the death of Christopher Jackman in January 1991. Louis Romano was then chosen to fill the vacancy in the Assembly. After Robert Menendez was elected as U.S. Representative in November 1992, Assemblymember Bernard Kenny was chosen to fill Menendez's vacancy in the New Jersey Senate. In turn, Hudson County, New Jersey Democratic Party boss Bruce Walter picked Rudy Garcia in January 1993 to fill Kenny's now-vacant spot in the Assembly.

In the June 1999 primaries, the Hudson County Democratic Party organization was looking for "new blood" and chose to give its official support to West New York mayor Albio Sires. Four-term incumbent Louis Romano ran in the Democratic primary and lost, making him the only one of the 80 incumbents in the Assembly to lose their primary bid.

Assemblymember Rafael Fraguela was knocked off the ballot in 2003 by the Hudson County Democratic Party and chose to run for the Senate as a Republican against Bernard Kenny. Fraguela insisted that the Democrats "have been putting aside all the Hispanic Democratic candidates", while "The GOP has had open arms to the Hispanic community". Caridad Rodriguez resigned from office in May 2011 after winning a seat on the West New York Board of Commissioners.

In the wake of the 2021 apportionment, the reconfiguration of municipalities in the 32nd and 33rd districts and the incumbent Assembly members in those districts choosing to retire or run for other elective office, the Hudson County Democratic Organization chose newcomers Julio Marenco and Gabe Rodriguez to run for the two Assembly seats. Marenco and Rodriguez defeated independent candidate Lea Sherman, the only other candidate running in the 2023 New Jersey General Assembly election.

== Election history ==
Senators and Assembly members elected from the district are as follows:

Session	Senate	General Assembly	
1974–1975	William Musto (D)	Thomas Gallo (D)	Christopher Jackman (D)
1976–1977	William Musto (D)	Thomas Gallo (D)	Christopher Jackman (D)
1978–1979	William Musto (D)	Thomas Gallo (D)	Christopher Jackman (D)
1980–1981	William Musto (D)	Thomas Gallo (D)	Christopher Jackman (D)
1982–1983	William Musto (D) (Note: Terminated from the Senate on May 10, 1982 upon his felony conviction for racketeering)	Thomas Gallo (D)	Christopher Jackman (D)
1982–1983	Nicholas LaRocca (D) (Note: Elected to the Senate in June 1982 special election, sworn in on June 24, 1982)	Thomas Gallo (D)	Christopher Jackman (D)
1984–1985	Christopher Jackman (D)	Nicholas LaRocca (D)	Robert Ranieri (D)
1986–1987	Christopher Jackman (D)	Ronald Dario (R)	Jose Arango (R)
1988–1989	Christopher Jackman (D) (Note: Died January 28, 1991)	Bernard Kenny (D)	Bob Menendez (D)
1990–1991	Christopher Jackman (D)	Bernard Kenny (D)	Bob Menendez (D) (Note: Appointed to the Senate on March 4, 1991)
1990–1991	Bob Menendez (D)	Bernard Kenny (D)	Louis Romano (D) (Note: Appointed to the Assembly on April 8, 1991)
1992–1993	Bob Menendez (D) (Note: Resigned December 17, 1992 following his election to Congress)	Bernard Kenny (D) (Note: Appointed to the Senate on January 25, 1993)	Louis Romano (D)
1992–1993	Bernard Kenny (D)	Rudy Garcia (D) (Note: Appointed to the Assembly on February 1, 1993)	Louis Romano (D)
1994–1995	Bernard Kenny (D)	Rudy Garcia (D)	Louis Romano (D)
1996–1997	Bernard Kenny (D)	Rudy Garcia (D)	Louis Romano (D)
1998–1999	Bernard Kenny (D)	Rudy Garcia (D)	Louis Romano (D)
2000–2001	Bernard Kenny (D)	Rudy Garcia (D)	Albio Sires (D)
2002–2003	Bernard Kenny (D)	Rafael Fraguela (D)	Albio Sires (D)
2002–2003	Bernard Kenny (D)	Rafael Fraguela (R) (Note: Switched party registration to Republican in April 2003)	Albio Sires (D)
2002–2003	Bernard Kenny (D)	Rafael Fraguela (D) (Note: Switched party registration to Democratic on December 18, 2003)	Albio Sires (D)
2004–2005	Bernard Kenny (D)	Brian P. Stack (D)	Albio Sires (D)
2006–2007	Bernard Kenny (D)	Brian P. Stack (D)	Albio Sires (D) (Note: Resigned on November 13, 2006 upon his election to Congress)
2006–2007	Bernard Kenny (D)	Brian P. Stack (D)	Silverio Vega (D) (Note: Appointed to the Assembly on December 11, 2006)
2008–2009	Brian P. Stack (D)	Ruben J. Ramos (D)	Caridad Rodriguez (D)
2010–2011	Brian P. Stack (D)	Ruben J. Ramos (D)	Caridad Rodriguez (D) (Note: Resigned May 17, 2011)
2012–2013	Brian P. Stack (D)	Ruben J. Ramos (D)	Sean Connors (D)
2014–2015	Brian P. Stack (D)	Carmelo Garcia (D)	Raj Mukherji (D)
2016–2017	Brian P. Stack (D)	Annette Chaparro (D)	Raj Mukherji (D)
2018–2019	Brian P. Stack (D)	Annette Chaparro (D)	Raj Mukherji (D)
2020–2021	Brian P. Stack (D)	Annette Chaparro (D)	Raj Mukherji (D)
2022–2023	Brian P. Stack (D)	Annette Chaparro (D)	Raj Mukherji (D)
2024–2025	Brian P. Stack (D)	Julio Marenco (D)	Gabe Rodriguez (D)
2026–2027	Brian P. Stack (D)	Larry Wainstein (D)	Gabe Rodriguez (D)

== Election results ==
=== Senate ===
2021 New Jersey general election
Party	Candidate	Votes	%	±%
Democratic	Brian P. Stack	37,059	85.1	▼3.1
Republican	Agha Khan	6,466	14.9	▲3.1
Total votes		43,525	100.0	

New Jersey general election, 2017
Party	Candidate	Votes	%	±%
Democratic	Brian P. Stack	36,594	88.2	▲7.5
Republican	Beth Hamburger	4,887	11.8	▼7.5
Total votes		41,481	100.0	

New Jersey general election, 2013
Party	Candidate	Votes	%	±%
Democratic	Brian P. Stack	26,980	80.7	▼5.9
Republican	James Sanford	6,460	19.3	▲5.9
Total votes		33,440	100.0	

2011 New Jersey general election
Party	Candidate	Votes	%
Democratic	Brian P. Stack	20,223	86.6
Republican	Beth Hamburger	3,136	13.4
Total votes		23,359	100.0

2007 New Jersey general election
Party	Candidate	Votes	%	±%
Democratic	Brian P. Stack	20,313	100.0	▲19.1
Total votes		20,313	100.0	

2003 New Jersey general election
Party	Candidate	Votes	%	±%
Democratic	Bernard F. Kenny Jr	20,809	80.9	▲5.6
Republican	Rafael Fraguela	4,904	19.1	▼5.6
Total votes		25,713	100.0	

2001 New Jersey general election
Party	Candidate	Votes	%
Democratic	Bernard F. Kenny Jr	28,659	75.3
Republican	Nancy Gaynor	9,378	24.7
Total votes		38,037	100.0

1997 New Jersey general election
Party	Candidate	Votes	%	±%
Democratic	Bernard F. Kenny, Jr.	27,914	72.6	▲9.3
Republican	Gerald Spike	10,517	27.4	▼8.2
Total votes		38,431	100.0	

1993 New Jersey general election
Party	Candidate	Votes	%	±%
Democratic	Bernard F. Kenny, Jr.	25,510	63.3	▼5.6
Republican	Fernando A. Alonso	14,325	35.6	▲4.5
Impact 93	Carlos Chirino	445	1.1	N/A
Total votes		40,280	100.0	

1991 New Jersey general election
Party	Candidate	Votes	%
Democratic	Robert Menendez	19,151	68.9
Republican	Carlos Munoz	8,652	31.1
Total votes		27,803	100.0

1987 New Jersey general election
Party	Candidate	Votes	%	±%
Democratic	Christopher J. Jackman	19,944	60.6	▼5.9
Republican	Ronald Dario	12,668	38.5	▲5.0
"Pride-Responsibility"	Hector Morales	282	0.9	N/A
Total votes		32,894	100.0	

1983 New Jersey general election
Party	Candidate	Votes	%	±%
Democratic	Christopher J. Jackman	18,916	66.5	▲15.7
Republican	Carlos E. Munoz	9,532	33.5	▲15.7 (▲23.4)
Total votes		28,448	100.0	

Special election, June 23, 1982
Party	Candidate	Votes	%	±%
Democratic	Nicholas J. LaRocca	7,170	50.8	▼11.2
Independent	Libero D. Marotta	3,002	21.3	N/A
Republican	Dennis Teti	2,510	17.8	▼20.2
Up New Era	Carlos E. Munoz	1,421	10.1	N/A
Total votes		14,103	100.0	

1981 New Jersey general election
Party	Candidate	Votes	%
Democratic	William V. Musto	24,012	62.0
Republican	Ralph A. Montanez	14,707	38.0
Total votes		38,719	100.0

1977 New Jersey general election
Party	Candidate	Votes	%	±%
Democratic	William V. Musto	25,270	71.8	▼6.2
Republican	Michael A. Litzas	7,244	20.6	▼1.4
Repeal Income Tax	William J. Meehan	1,719	4.9	N/A
For The People	Eulalio Jose Negrin	966	2.7	N/A
Total votes		35,199	100.0	

1973 New Jersey general election
Party	Candidate	Votes	%
Democratic	William V. Musto	30,176	78.0
Republican	Thomas McSherry	8,492	22.0
Total votes		38,668	100.0

=== General Assembly ===
2021 New Jersey general election
Party	Candidate	Votes	%	±%
Democratic	Annette Chaparro	33,463	40.9	▼1.4
Democratic	Raj Mukherji	33,189	40.5	▼1.9
Republican	Marcos Marte	7,685	9.4	▲1.4
Republican	Jacob Curtis	7,551	9.2	▲1.9
Total votes		81,888	100.0	

2019 New Jersey general election
Party	Candidate	Votes	%	±%
Democratic	Raj Mukherji	24,416	42.4	▼2.9
Democratic	Annette Chaparro	24,366	42.3	▼4.4
Republican	Holly Lucyk	4,614	8.0	▼0.1
Republican	Fabian Rohena	4,204	7.3	N/A
Total votes		57,600	100.0	

New Jersey general election, 2017
Party	Candidate	Votes	%	±%
Democratic	Annette Chaparro	32,988	46.7	▲7.1
Democratic	Raj Mukherji	31,997	45.3	▲6.8
Republican	Holly Lucyk	5,697	8.1	▼3.3
Total votes		70,682	100.0	

New Jersey general election, 2015
Party	Candidate	Votes	%	±%
Democratic	Annette Chaparro	12,338	39.6	▲2.1
Democratic	Raj Mukherji	11,978	38.5	▲4.0
Republican	Garrett P. Simulcik Jr.	3,556	11.4	▼2.6
Republican	Javier Sosa	3,260	10.5	▼3.4
Total votes		31,132	100.0	

New Jersey general election, 2013
Party	Candidate	Votes	%	±%
Democratic	Carmelo G. Garcia	20,681	37.5	▼5.2
Democratic	Raj Mukherji	19,029	34.5	▼7.3
Republican	Armando Hernandez	7,737	14.0	▲6.1
Republican	Jude Anthony Tiscornia	7,691	13.9	▲6.3
Total votes		55,138	100.0	

New Jersey general election, 2011
Party	Candidate	Votes	%
Democratic	Ruben J. Ramos, Jr.	17,444	42.7
Democratic	Sean Connors	17,064	41.8
Republican	Christopher Garcia	3,214	7.9
Republican	Fernando Uribe	3,121	7.6
Total votes		40,843	100.0

New Jersey general election, 2009
Party	Candidate	Votes	%	±%
Democratic	Ruben J. Ramos, Jr.	24,734	37.9	▼12.8
Democratic	Caridad Rodriguez	23,451	35.9	▼13.4
Republican	Beth S. Hamburger	8,788	13.4	N/A
Republican	John Barbadillo	8,368	12.8	N/A
Total votes		65,341	100.0	

New Jersey general election, 2007
Party	Candidate	Votes	%	±%
Democratic	Ruben J. Ramos Jr	18,708	50.7	▲9.9
Democratic	Caridad Rodriguez	18,227	49.3	▲9.9
Total votes		36,935	100.0	

New Jersey general election, 2005
Party	Candidate	Votes	%	±%
Democratic	Brian P. Stack	29,452	40.8	▼1.1
Democratic	Albio Sires	28,456	39.4	▼0.8
Republican	Richard Valdes	6,777	9.4	▲1.3
Republican	Alejandria Rodriguez	6,651	9.2	▲1.1
Vote Mango	Christopher Mango	854	1.2	N/A
Total votes		72,190	100.0	

New Jersey general election, 2003
Party	Candidate	Votes	%	±%
Democratic	Brian P. Stack	21,457	41.9	▲4.3
Democratic	Albio Sires	20,580	40.2	▲2.4
Republican	Jose C. Munoz	4,159	8.1	▼4.3
Republican	Elise DiNardo	4,141	8.1	▼4.1
Green	Maria M. Rios	866	1.7	N/A
Total votes		51,203	100.0	

New Jersey general election, 2001
Party	Candidate	Votes	%
Democratic	Albio Sires	28,130	37.8
Democratic	Rafael J. Fraguela	28,019	37.6
Republican	Sergio Alonso	9,229	12.4
Republican	Helen Pinoargotty	9,098	12.2
Total votes		74,476	100.0

New Jersey general election, 1999
Party	Candidate	Votes	%	±%
Democratic	Raul “Rudy” Garcia	18,448	41.7	▲4.8
Democratic	Albio Sires	17,492	39.5	▲3.8
Republican	Manuel E. Fernandez	3,835	8.7	▼5.1
Republican	Francisco S. Arrojo	3,459	7.8	▼5.8
Taking The Future	Yadira J. Diaz-Castro	1,020	2.3	N/A
Total votes		44,254	100.0	

New Jersey general election, 1997
Party	Candidate	Votes	%	±%
Democratic	Raul “Rudy” Garcia	28,335	36.9	▼3.0
Democratic	Louis A. Romano	27,440	35.7	▼2.8
Republican	Micaela M. Alvarez	10,608	13.8	▲3.5
Republican	Freddy Gomez	10,447	13.6	▲3.3
Total votes		76,830	100.0	

New Jersey general election, 1995
Party	Candidate	Votes	%	±%
Democratic	Raul “Rudy” Garcia	21,208	39.9	▲8.7
Democratic	Louis A. Romano	20,474	38.5	▲7.6
Republican	Raphael S. Alvarez	5,488	10.3	▼7.8
Republican	Joseph Luizzi	5,453	10.3	▼7.8
Conservative	Yadira Davila	265	0.5	N/A
Conservative	Julio Espinal	226	0.4	N/A
Total votes		53,114	100.0	

New Jersey general election, 1993
Party	Candidate	Votes	%	±%
Democratic	Raul “Rudy” Garcia	24,761	31.2	▼3.3
Democratic	Louis A. Romano	24,463	30.9	▼3.0
Republican	Mary C. Gaspar	14,387	18.1	▲2.2
Republican	Armando C. Hernandez	14,343	18.1	▲2.4
Impact '93	Ivan Dominguez	551	0.7	N/A
Independent Minority Movement	Bartolome Ruiz	396	0.5	N/A
Impact '93	Oscar Noa	385	0.5	N/A
Total votes		79,286	100.0	

1991 New Jersey general election
Party	Candidate	Votes	%
Democratic	Bernard F. Kenny, Jr.	18,522	34.5
Democratic	Louis A. Romano	18,220	33.9
Republican	Antonio Miguelez	8,558	15.9
Republican	A. Lazaro Guas	8,435	15.7
Total votes		53,735	100.0

1989 New Jersey general election
Party	Candidate	Votes	%	±%
Democratic	Bernard F. Kenny, Jr.	24,294	34.4	▲4.8
Democratic	Robert Menendez	23,767	33.7	▲4.7
Republican	Ann Clark	11,738	16.6	▼3.6
Republican	Antonio Miguelez	10,800	15.3	▼4.6
Total votes		70,599	100.0	

1987 New Jersey general election
Party	Candidate	Votes	%	±%
Democratic	Bernard F. Kenny, Jr.	18,810	29.6	▲5.8
Democratic	Robert Menendez	18,446	29.0	▲7.6
Republican	Angelo M. Valente	12,888	20.2	▼7.7
Republican	Jose O. Arango	12,638	19.9	▼7.0
"Pride-Responsibility"	Michael P. Dapuzzo	557	0.9	N/A
"Pride-Responsibility"	Wanda Morales	312	0.5	N/A
Total votes		63,651	100.0	

1985 New Jersey general election
Party	Candidate	Votes	%	±%
Republican	Ronald A. Dario	20,422	27.9	▲10.0
Republican	Jose O. Arango	19,748	26.9	▲9.7
Democratic	Robert A. Ranieri	17,443	23.8	▼8.9
Democratic	Mario R. Hernandez	15,671	21.4	▼10.8
Total votes		73,284	100.0	

New Jersey general election, 1983
Party	Candidate	Votes	%	±%
Democratic	Robert A. Ranieri	17,378	32.7	▼0.6
Democratic	Nicholas J. LaRocca	17,121	32.2	▼1.0
Republican	Jorge T. Gallo	9,532	17.9	▲0.9
Republican	Francisco Cossio	9,149	17.2	▲0.7
Total votes		53,180	100.0	

New Jersey general election, 1981
Party	Candidate	Votes	%
Democratic	Thomas A. Gallo	25,291	33.3
Democratic	Christopher J. Jackman	25,229	33.2
Republican	Carlos E. Munoz	12,900	17.0
Republican	Jose M. Garcia	12,513	16.5
Total votes		75,933	100.0

New Jersey general election, 1979
Party	Candidate	Votes	%	±%
Democratic	Christopher J. Jackman	18,102	34.1	▼1.2
Democratic	Thomas A. Gallo	17,883	33.7	▼1.4
Republican	Roger Dorian	5,173	9.8	▼3.0
Republican	Erich Urban	4,725	8.9	▼3.0
Proven Leadership	Robert A. Ranieri	3,802	7.2	N/A
Responsible Representation	Virginia E. Zanetich	3,344	6.3	N/A
Total votes		53,029	100.0	

New Jersey general election, 1977
Party	Candidate	Votes	%	±%
Democratic	Christopher J. Jackman	23,723	35.3	▼1.8
Democratic	Thomas A. Gallo	23,572	35.1	▼1.7
Republican	Dominick Facchini	8,615	12.8	▲1.2
Republican	Robert J. Pompliano	8,011	11.9	▲0.3
Repeal Income Tax	Charles Velli	1,616	2.4	▼0.5
Repeal Income Tax	Ralph Lanni	1,583	2.4	N/A
Total votes		67,120	100.0	

New Jersey general election, 1975
Party	Candidate	Votes	%	±%
Democratic	Christopher J. Jackman	23,257	37.1	▼1.2
Democratic	Thomas A. Gallo	23,094	36.8	▼1.7
Republican	George Rossi	7,311	11.6	▼0.3
Republican	Joan Kriete Fitzsimons	7,282	11.6	▲0.3
Good Government Independent	Charles Velli	1,820	2.9	N/A
Total votes		62,764	100.0	

New Jersey general election, 1973
Party	Candidate	Votes	%
Democratic	Thomas A. Gallo	28,731	38.5
Democratic	Christopher J. Jackman	28,586	38.3
Republican	Mario De Luca	8,842	11.9
Republican	Ronald Thomas Hazzard	8,400	11.3
Total votes		74,559	100.0
