= 2005 Hoboken mayoral election =

- May 10, 2005(first round); June 14, 2005 (runoff)
Candidate	David Roberts	Carol Marsh	Frank Raia
First round	3,803; 32.59%	2,976; 25.5%	2,004; 17.17%
Runoff	5,761; 57.61%	4,239; 42.39%	Eliminated
Candidate	Scott Delea	Michael Russo	Evelyn Smith
First round	1,336; 11.45%	1,259; 10.79%	289; 2.47%
Runoff	Eliminated	Eliminated	Eliminated
Mayor before election
David Roberts
Democratic
Elected mayor
David Roberts
Democratic

The Hoboken mayoral election of 2005 is an election that was held on May 10, 2005, in Hoboken, New Jersey for Hoboken residents, in which the Mayor of Hoboken was chosen based on the number of votes. However, none of the five mayoral candidates was able to obtain at least 50% of the vote. In the May 10 election, the top two vote-getters, Mayor David Roberts and Carol Marsh, ran in the June 14th runoff election, and Roberts won with 5,761 votes to 4,239 votes.

There were also 17 people running for 3 at-large seats on the Hoboken City Council, but in the same manner as those running for mayor, no candidate could get a majority, so the 6 people running for council that got the most votes were in the June 14 runoff election (everyone on Roberts' slate and everyone on Marsh's slate). Only three of the 17 running for Hoboken City Council could win the 4-year term. Roberts' slate won.

There was a miscommunication on the night of May 10, 2005, when the people at Roberts' headquarters announced over a megaphone to a crowd of supporters that Roberts was going to win the election. Either they didn't get the correct information in time, or they concluded too quickly, because an hour after the announcement, it was found that neither Roberts nor Marsh had gained 50% of the vote. Evelyn Smith, the vice president of the Hoboken NAACP, came in last with only 289 votes. However, Smith wasn't upset with her defeat, saying, "It was pretty much what I expected."

Independent Scott Delea also knew from the very start that his chances of winning were small. The Hoboken Reporter Volume 22 Number 37 said the following about Delea: "[Delea] received an extremely strong showing for a political newcomer. Internet marketing executive Scott Delea obtained [1,336] votes. That total means that about 13 percent of all voters pushed the lever for Delea. With little budget but a strong work ethic, Delea was able to beat out the entire slates of Smith and Russo, which is no small feat." In an advertisement in the Hoboken Reporter Volume 22 Number 36, Scott Delea said the following: "When you vote for a political team, you're voting for people pledged to represent a mayoral candidate's interests. When you vote for an independent, such as myself, you're electing a Council voice that represents your interests." However, despite his attempt, Delea was unable to win.

== Candidates ==
Six candidates in total ran in the election:

- Mayor David Roberts
- Carol Marsh
- Frank "Pupie" Raia
- Michael Russo
- Evelyn Smith
- Scott Delea

== Results ==
Candidate	Office running for	Running with (in team)	Won or lost	Votes given
David Roberts	Mayor of Hoboken (re-election)	Ruben Ramos Jr., Theresa LaBruno, Peter Cammarano	Won	May 10: 3,803; June 14 Runoff: 5,761
Carol Marsh	Mayor of Hoboken	Inés García-Keim, Anthony Soares, Brian Urbano	Lost in runoff	May 10: 2,976; June 14 Runoff: 4,239
Frank "Pupie" Raia	Mayor of Hoboken	Theresa Burns, Anthony Mussara, Ron Rosenberg	Lost	2,004
Michael Russo	Mayor of Hoboken	Genevy Dimitrion, Manny Ortega, Brian Keller	Lost	1,259
Evelyn Smith	Mayor of Hoboken	Carrie Gilliard, Diane Nieves, Elizabeth Falco	Lost	289
Ruben Ramos Jr.	Hoboken City Council	David Roberts, Theresa LaBruno, Peter Cammarano	Won	May 10: 3,527; June 14 Runoff: 5,344
Theresa LaBruno	Hoboken City Council	David Roberts, Ruben Ramos Jr., Peter Cammarano	Won	May 10: 3,182; June 14 Runoff: 5,067
Peter Cammarano	Hoboken City Council	David Roberts, Ruben Ramos Jr., Theresa LaBruno	Won	May 10: 2,785; June 14 Runoff: 4,982
Inés García-Keim	Hoboken City Council	Carol Marsh, Anthony Soares, Brian Urbano	Lost in runoff	May 10: 2,492; June 14 Runoff: 3,949
Anthony Soares	Hoboken City Council	Carol Marsh, Inés García-Keim, Brian Urbano	Lost in runoff	May 10: 2,838; June 14 Runoff: 4,074
Brian Urbano	Hoboken City Council	Carol Marsh, Inés García-Keim, Anthony Soares	Lost in runoff	May 10: 2,287; June 14 Runoff: 3,863
Theresa Burns	Hoboken City Council	Frank "Pupie" Raia, Anthony Mussara, Ron Rosenberg	Lost	1,701
Anthony Mussara	Hoboken City Council	Frank "Pupie" Raia	Lost	1,628
Ron Rosenberg	Hoboken City Council	Frank "Pupie" Raia, Theresa Burns, Anthony Mussara,	Lost	1,590
Genevy Dimitrion	Hoboken City Council	Michael Russo, Manny Ortega, Brian Keller	Lost	640
Manny Ortega	Hoboken City Council	Michael Russo, Genevy Dimitrion, Brian Keller	Lost	760
Brian Keller	Hoboken City Council	Michael Russo, Genevy Dimitrion, Manny Ortega	Lost	666
Carrie Gilliard	Hoboken City Council	Evelyn Smith, Diane Nieves, Elizabeth Falco	Lost	301
Diane Nieves	Hoboken City Council	Evelyn Smith, Carrie Gilliard, Elizabeth Falco	Lost	320
Elizabeth Falco	Hoboken City Council	Evelyn Smith, Carrie Gilliard, Diane Nieves	Lost	516
Andrew Amato (independent)	Hoboken City Council	None	Lost	566
Scott Delea (independent)	Hoboken City Council	None	Lost	1,336
