= 2021 New Jersey elections =

- November 2, 2021

A general election was held in the U.S. state of New Jersey on November 2, 2021. Primary elections were held on June 8. All elected offices at the state level are on the ballot in this election cycle, including Governor and Lieutenant Governor for four-year terms, all 80 seats in the New Jersey General Assembly for two-year terms, and all 40 seats in the State Senate for four-year terms. In addition to the gubernatorial and State Legislative elections, numerous county offices and County Commissioners in addition to municipal offices were up for election. There were also two statewide ballot questions.

== Governor ==
2021 New Jersey gubernatorial election
- November 2, 2021
- Turnout: 40.5% (▲2.0%)
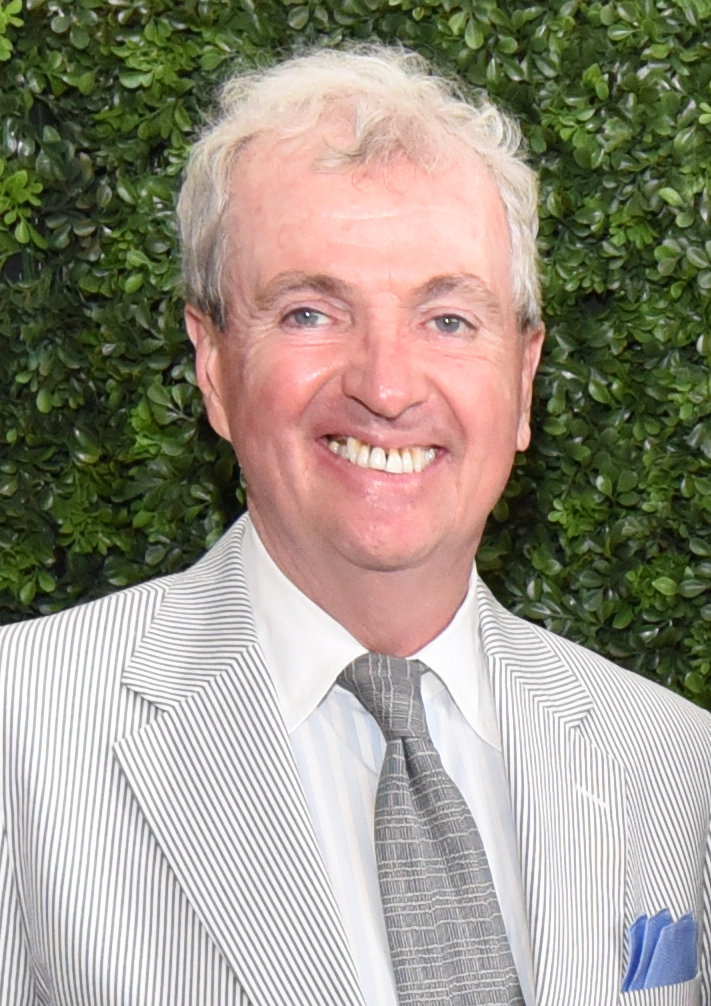

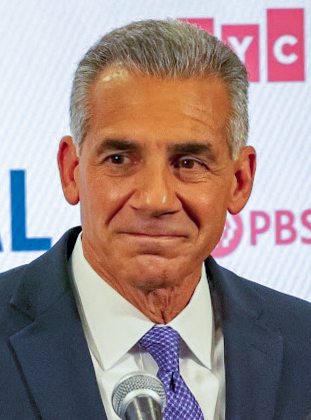
Nominee	Phil Murphy	Jack Ciattarelli
Party	Democratic	Republican
Running mate	Sheila Oliver	Diane Allen
Popular vote	1,339,471	1,255,185
Percentage	51.2%	48.0%
- Murphy: 40–50% 50–60% 60–70% 70–80% 80–90% >90% Ciattarelli: 40–50% 50–60% 60–70% 70–80% 80–90% Tie
Governor before election
Phil Murphy
Democratic
Elected Governor
Phil Murphy
Democratic

== State senate ==
2021 New Jersey State Senate election
- November 2, 2021

All 40 seats in the New Jersey Senate 21 seats needed for a majority
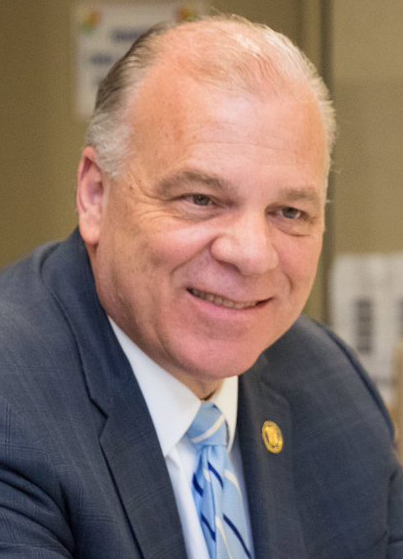

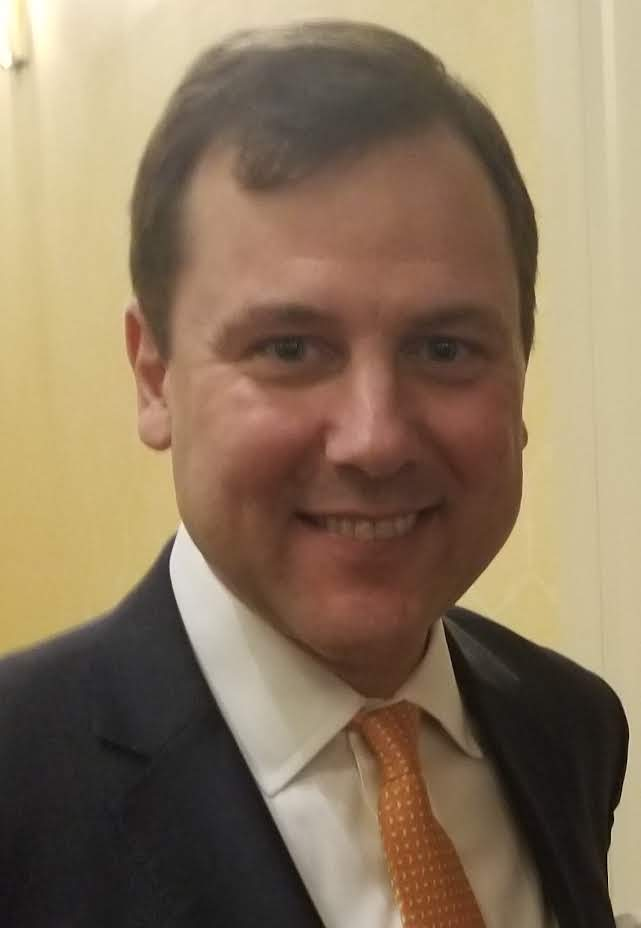
	Majority party	Minority party
Leader	Steve Sweeney (lost re-election)	Thomas Kean Jr. (retired)
Party	Democratic	Republican
Leader since	January 12, 2010	January 8, 2008
Leader's seat	3rd (West Deptford)	21st (Westfield)
Last election	25 seats, 59.1%	15 seats, 40.7%
Seats before	25	14
Seats won	24	16
Seat change	▼1	▲2
Popular vote	1,296,465	1,199,006
Percentage	51.9%	48.0%
Swing	▼7.2 pp	▲7.3 pp
- Republican gain Republican hold Democratic gain Democratic hold
Senate President before election
Steve Sweeney
Democratic
Elected Senate President
Nicholas Scutari
Democratic

The 2021 New Jersey State Senate election was held on November 2, 2021. New Jersey voters elected state senators in all of the state's legislative districts for a two-year term to the New Jersey Senate. This was the first election since 1991 where Republicans net gained state Senate seats. Democrats would later be restored to 25 seats following the party switch of Samuel D. Thompson in 2023.

== General Assembly ==
2021 New Jersey General Assembly election
- November 2, 2021

All 80 seats in the New Jersey General Assembly 41 seats needed for a majority
	Majority party	Minority party
Leader	Craig Coughlin	Jon Bramnick (retired)
Party	Democratic	Republican
Leader since	January 9, 2018	January 17, 2012
Leader's seat	19th (Woodbridge)	21st (Westfield) (ran for Senate)
Last election	52 seats, 55.3%	28 seats, 44.1%
Seats before	52	28
Seats won	46	34
Seat change	▼6	▲6
Popular vote	2,521,259	2,351,564
Percentage	51.6%	48.2%
Swing	▼9.33 pp	▲9.13 pp
- Results: Democratic hold Republican hold Republican gain
Speaker before election
Craig Coughlin
Democratic
Elected Speaker
Craig Coughlin
Democratic

The 2021 New Jersey General Assembly election was held on November 2, 2021. New Jersey voters elected two Assembly members in all of the state's legislative districts for a two-year term to the New Jersey General Assembly.

All 80 seats of the New Jersey General Assembly were up for election. Democrats held a 52-28 majority in the lower house prior to the election. The members of the New Jersey Legislature are chosen from 40 electoral districts. Each district elects one state senator and two State Assembly members. New Jersey uses coterminous legislative districts for both its State Senate and General Assembly.

Ultimately, Republicans gained six seats in the chamber, reducing Democrats' majority to 46-34. They flipped both seats in the 2nd, 3rd, and 11th districts.

== Ballot measures ==
Two statewide questions were on the ballot, one of which was approved by voters:

- Public Question Number 1, Allows wagering on postseason college sports competitions held in N.J. and competitions in which a N.J.-based college team participates. This amendment was defeated.

Question 1 Results by county No: 60–70%; 50–60%

- Public Question Number 2, Allows organizations to use raffle money to raise money for their own organization. This amendment passed.

Question 2 Results by county Yes: 70–80%; 60–70%; 50–60%

== Local elections ==
Various county and municipal elections were held simultaneously, including elections for mayor in Atlantic City, Hoboken, and Jersey City.
