= 2025 Hoboken mayoral election =

Local election in New Jersey, US

- November 4, 2025; December 2, 2025 (runoff)

Candidate	Emily Jabbour	Michael Russo	Tiffanie Fisher
Party	Nonpartisan	Nonpartisan	Nonpartisan
First round	5,170; 27.0%	4,659; 24.3%	3,674; 19.2%
Runoff	6,664; 53.8%	5,728; 46.2%	Eliminated
Candidate	Ruben Ramos	Dini Ajmani
Party	Nonpartisan	Nonpartisan
First round	2,871; 15.0%	2,500; 13.1%
Runoff	Eliminated	Eliminated
- Jabbour: 20–30% 30–40% Russo: 20–30% 30–40% 40–50% Ramos: 20–30% 30–40% Fisher: 30–40% 40–50% Jabbour: 50–60% 60–70% 70–80% Russo: 50–60% 60–70% 70–80%
Mayor before election
Ravinder Bhalla
Democratic
Elected mayor
Emily Jabbour
Democratic

The 2025 Hoboken mayoral election took place on November 4, 2025, to elect the mayor of Hoboken, New Jersey. Incumbent Mayor Ravinder Bhalla announced that he would not seek re-election for a third term on January 10, 2025. On January 15, 2025, Bhalla announced that he would be seeking the open State Assembly seat for New Jersey's 32nd legislative district.

No candidate reached 50% of the vote, and a runoff election was scheduled for December 2, 2025, between Michael Russo and Emily Jabbour.

Councilwoman at-large Emily Jabbour defeated 3rd Ward Councilman Michael Russo in the runoff election, becoming the mayor-elect of Hoboken.

== Candidates ==
=== Advanced to the runoff ===
- Emily Jabbour, at-large councilmember
- Michael Russo, councilmember from the 3rd ward and son of former mayor Anthony Russo

=== Eliminated in the first round ===
- Dini Ajmani, former U.S. Treasury Department Deputy Assistant Secretary
- Tiffanie Fisher, councilmember from the 2nd ward
- Ruben Ramos, councilmember from the 4th ward and former state assemblymember from the 33rd district (2008–2014)
- Pat Waiters, perennial candidate

=== Declined ===
- Ravinder Bhalla, incumbent mayor (ran for state assembly)

== General election ==
=== Endorsements ===
Emily Jabbour

Local officials

- Phil Cohen, vice president of the Hoboken city council from the 5th ward
- Jim Doyle, president of the Hoboken city council at-large

Labor unions

- SEIU 32BJ
- Hotel and Gaming Trades Council

Organizations

- Everytown for Gun Safety Action Fund
Michael Russo

Labor unions

- Eastern Atlantic States Regional Council of Carpenters
- AFSCME District 1199J

=== Results ===
2025 Hoboken mayoral general election
Party	Candidate	Votes	%
Nonpartisan	Emily Jabbour	5,170	27.0%
Nonpartisan	Michael Russo	4,659	24.3%
Nonpartisan	Tiffanie Fisher	3,674	19.2%
Nonpartisan	Ruben Ramos	2,871	15.0%
Nonpartisan	Dini Ajmani	2,500	13.1%
Nonpartisan	Pat Waiters	172	0.9%
Write-in		113	0.6%
Total votes		19,159	100.0%

== Runoff ==
=== Endorsements ===
Emily Jabbour

2025 mayoral candidates

- Dini Ajmani, former U.S. Treasury Department Deputy Assistant Secretary

State legislators

- Katie Brennan, state assemblymember-elect from the 32nd district
- Raj Mukherji, state senator from the 32nd district (2024–present)

Local officials

- Mike Lenz, former councilmember from the 4th ward
- Ailene McGuirk, president of the Hoboken Board of Education
- Dawn Zimmer, former mayor of Hoboken (2009–2018)
Michael Russo

2025 mayoral candidates

- Tiffanie Fisher, councilmember from the 2nd ward
- Ruben Ramos, councilmember from the 4th ward and former state assemblymember from the 33rd district (2008–2014)

Local officials

- Mike DeFusco, former councilmember from the 1st ward
- Paul Presinzano, councilmember from the 1st ward

Party officials

- Pavel Sokolov, Hoboken Republican Party Chair

=== Results ===
Jabbour won 53.8% of the vote, defeating Russo, who garnered 46.2%. Jabbour carried 4 of Hoboken's 6 council wards, including those of 2025 mayoral candidates Tiffanie Fisher (51.3%-48.7%) and Ruben Ramos (52.8%-47.2%), both of whom had endorsed Russo in the runoff.

Additionally, each of the 3 candidates on Jabbour's at-large council slate were elected. This left Jabbour's allies with 4 seats on Hoboken's 9-member city council, one short of a majority, when including Jabbour endorser and 5th Ward Councilman Phil Cohen.

2025 Hoboken mayoral runoff
Party	Candidate	Votes	%
Nonpartisan	Emily Jabbour	6,664	53.78%
Nonpartisan	Michael Russo	5,728	46.22%
Total votes		12,392	100.00
