= McFeely =

McFeely is a surname. Notable people with the surname include:

- Anthony McFeely (1909–1986), Irish Roman Catholic bishop
- Bernard N. McFeely (1882–1949), American politician
- Stephen McFeely (born 1969), American screenwriter
- W. Drake McFeely (born c. 1954), American publisher
- William S. McFeely (1930–2019), American academic and historian

== Fictional characters ==
- Mr. McFeely, a character in the television series Mister Rogers' Neighborhood

== See also ==
- Elizabeth Craig-McFeely (born 1927), British Director of the Women's Royal Naval Service
