= Steve Cappiello =

American mayor

35th Mayor of Hoboken
- In office July 1973 – June 1985
- Preceded by: Louis DePascale
- Succeeded by: Thomas Vezzetti

Personal details
- Born: May 20, 1923 Hoboken, New Jersey, U.S.
- Died: April 17, 2013 (aged 89) Hoboken, New Jersey, U.S.
- Party: Democratic
- Spouse: Dorothy Cappiello
- Children: Steven Cappiello, Dr. Linda Cappiello, Janet Manocchio
- Occupation: Police officer

Steve Cappiello (May 20, 1923 – April 17, 2013) was a police officer and American Democratic Party politician who served as the 35th mayor of Hoboken, New Jersey from 1973 until 1985. Cappiello served as a city councilman from 1963 until his election as mayor, and again after completing his three terms. He also served on the Hudson County Board of Chosen Freeholders from 1981 to 1984, when he lost his re-election bid to Republican Roger Dorian.

== Biography ==
Cappiello was born in Hoboken, New Jersey. He attended the local public schools, graduated from Demarest High School (now Hoboken High School). He served in the United States Navy.

He served for 13 years in the Hoboken police department, where he was promoted to the rank of sergeant. He founded and was the treasurer of the Hoboken Municipal Employees Credit Union.

In 1963 he served as a councilman for the Hoboken third ward for 10 years before being elected mayor in 1973.

Capiello was elected in May 1973 defeating incumbent mayor DePascale and avoiding a runoff by 84 votes. Capiello was the mayor who laid the groundwork for the development along the Hoboken waterfront, and was credited with helping to turn Hoboken around.

In 1977 his nephew was kidnapped and murdered.

He was a Hudson County freeholder from 1981 to 1984.

In 1985, Cappiello narrowly lost the mayoral election to Thomas Vezzetti. Capiello's support for gentrification and his attribution of several arsons to a purported tradition of Puerto Rican revenge burnings resulted in many Puerto Rican residents voting for Vezetti.

On February 17, 2009, Cappiello announced his intention to run for mayor again. He never filed and later endorsed Peter Cammarano. After Cammarano's resignation, Cappiello endorsed Frank Raia in the special election to complete the unfinished term.

He died on April 17, 2013, at Hoboken University Medical Center.
