= Aaron Ogden =

American soldier, lawyer and politician (1756–1839)

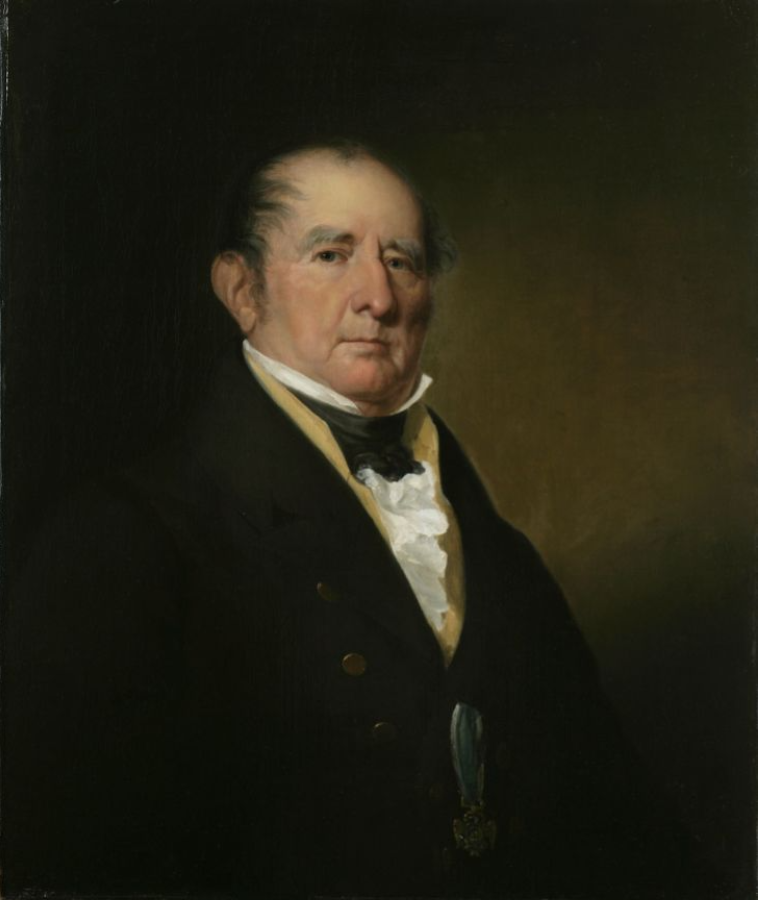
- portrait by Asher Brown Durand

5th Governor of New Jersey
- In office October 29, 1812 – October 29, 1813
- Preceded by: Joseph Bloomfield
- Succeeded by: William Sanford Pennington

United States Senator from New Jersey
- In office February 28, 1801 – March 3, 1803
- Preceded by: James Schureman
- Succeeded by: John Condit

Member of the New Jersey General Assembly
- In office 1803–1812

Personal details
- Born: December 3, 1756 Elizabethtown, Province of New Jersey, British America
- Died: April 19, 1839 (aged 82) Jersey City, New Jersey, U.S.
- Party: Federalist
- Spouse: Elizabeth Chetwood
- Relations: Matthias Ogden (brother); Frederick Ogden (grandson); William Chetwood (brother-in-law)
- Children: 7, including Elias
- Education: College of New Jersey

Military service
- Allegiance: United States
- Branch/service: Continental Army
- Rank: Brigade major
- Unit: 1st New Jersey Regiment
- Battles/wars: Revolutionary War

Aaron Ogden (December 3, 1756 – April 19, 1839) was an American soldier, lawyer, United States senator and the fifth governor of New Jersey. Ogden is perhaps best known today as the complainant in Gibbons v. Ogden which destroyed the monopoly power of steamboats on the Hudson River in 1824.

== Early life ==
Ogden was born in Elizabethtown (known today as "Elizabeth") in the Province of New Jersey. He was the son of Robert Ogden, a lawyer and public official who served as Speaker of the New Jersey lower house immediately preceding the Revolution, and Phebe (née Hatfield) Ogden. Ogden's brother Matthias Ogden (1754–1791) was a Revolutionary War soldier and his nephew, Daniel Haines, also served as Governor of New Jersey on two separate occasions.

Ogden, a Presbyterian, graduated from the College of New Jersey (now Princeton University) in 1773, and served as a grammar school tutor from 1773 to 1775.

== Career ==
In the American Revolutionary War, Ogden was appointed a lieutenant in the 1st New Jersey Regiment; his older brother Matthias Ogden was the lieutenant colonel. Aaron Ogden served in various roles throughout the war, seeing action and rising to the rank of brigade major. In 1778, he visited the house occupied by the family of diarist Sally Wister, who described him as "a genteel young fellow, with an aquiline nose." Ogden was wounded at the siege of Yorktown in 1781.

Ogden was admitted as an original member of The Society of the Cincinnati in the state of New Jersey when it was established in 1783. He went on to serve as the President of the New Jersey Society from 1824 until his death in 1839, and President General of The Society of the Cincinnati from 1829 until his death.

=== Political career ===
After the war, Ogden studied law and was admitted to the bar in 1784. He commenced practice in Elizabeth and served as a presidential elector in the 1796 electoral college that elected John Adams. He was clerk of Essex County from 1785 to 1803.

He was elected as a Federalist to the United States Senate to fill the vacancy caused by the resignation of James Schureman and served from February 28, 1801, to March 3, 1803. He lost his bid for re-election to the Senate in 1802. Ogden ran several times for New Jersey's at-large congressional district, finishing 6th in 1800 (with the top 5 winning), and also running in 1803, 1804, 1806, 1808 (both in the regular and special elections), and 1810.

In 1803, Ogden was elected to the New Jersey General Assembly, where he served until 1812. Ogden was elected trustee of the College of New Jersey (later to become Princeton University) in 1803, a post in which he served until his death.

In 1812, Ogden was elected as Governor of New Jersey in a wave of Federalist victories across the state due to opposition to the War of 1812. Ogden had been nominated by his Federalist colleagues as governor many times before, but the Republicans held the majority in the Assembly and elected their choice from 1803 to 1812. During his term as governor, "funds were secured for the military's use in the war against Britain." After running unsuccessfully for re-election, the Federalists lost their majority in the Assembly and Ogden retired from political life. Ogden was nominated by President James Madison as major general of the Army in 1813, but declined the appointment.

=== Steamboat operations ===
In 1811, he became engaged in steamboat navigation by building the steamboat Sea Horse to run between Elizabeth and New York City. In 1812, in Livingston v. Van Ingen, the courts chose to upheld a steamboat monopoly over the Hudson River. In 1813, the New York State Legislature further upheld the monopoly created by Chancellor Robert Livingston and Robert Fulton, who had designed the steamboat. In response, Ogden agreed to pay them for a ten-year monopoly to run his line.

As a result of a feud with his neighbor and competing steamboat operator who violated the statutory monopoly, Thomas Gibbons, Ogden filed the complaint in Gibbons v. Ogden, seeking to enjoin Gibbons from operating a steamboat on New York waters. As a result, the United States Supreme Court declared unconstitutional New York's attempted monopoly on steamboat operation between New York and New Jersey based on the Commerce Clause. In the case, decided by the U.S. Supreme Court in 1824, Ogden was represented by Samuel L. Southard and Joseph Hopkinson, while Livingston was represented by Thomas Addis Emmet, and Gibbons by Daniel Webster and U.S. Attorney General William Wirt.

=== Later life ===
Ogden moved to Jersey City in 1829 and resumed the practice of law. It was in Jersey City where he was arrested for debt and sent to a debtors' prison. He was released several months later under an act of the Legislature that provided "that no Revolutionary officer or soldier should be imprisoned for debt. The law was so framed as to cover the case of Col. Ogden, and he was released." In 1830, he was appointed as Collector of Customs of Jersey City, an office created specifically for him by an act of Congress, and served until his death in Jersey City.

== Personal life ==
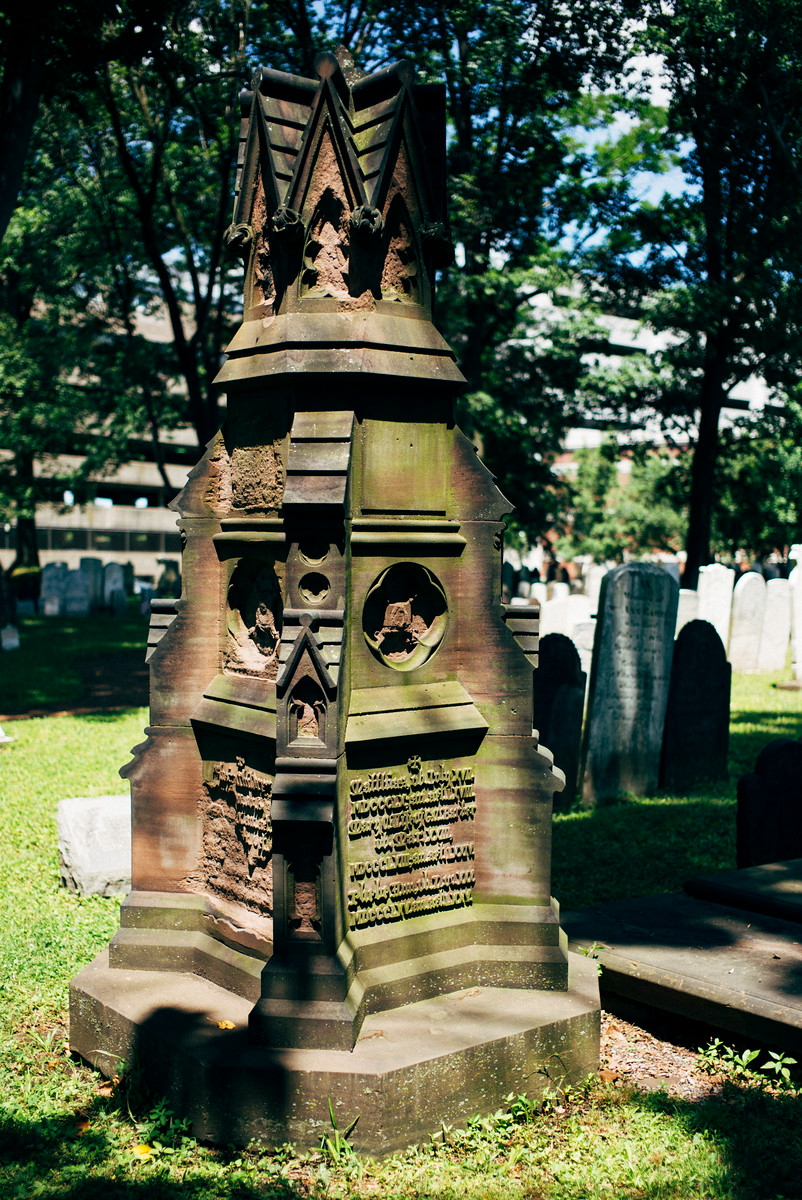
Aaron Ogden Monument, First Presbyterian Churchyard, Elizabeth, NJ

Ogden was married to Elizabeth Chetwood (1766–1826), the daughter of John Chetwood, an attorney, and Mary (née Emott) Chetwood (d. 1786). She was the older sister of U.S. Representative and Mayor of Elizabeth William Chetwood (1771–1857). Together, they were the parents of:

- Mary Chetwood Ogden (1789–1863), who was married to George Clinton Barber.
- Phebe Ann Ogden (1790–1865), who served as Vice Regent of the Mount Vernon Ladies' Association.
- Matthias Ogden (1792–1860), who married Lucille Robert.
- John Robert Ogden (1794–1845).
- Elias Bailey Dayton Ogden (1797–1799), who died young.
- Elias Bailey Dayton Ogden (1800–1865), who was named after his deceased brother. Elias, who married three times, served as an associate justice of the New Jersey Supreme Court from 1842 until his death in 1865.
- Aaron Ogden Jr. (1803–1803), who died young.

Ogden died in Jersey City, New Jersey on April 19, 1839. Ogden's body is interred at the burial ground of the First Presbyterian Church of Elizabeth. Ogden Street in Trenton, New Jersey is named in his honor.

He was a slaveholder.

=== Descendants ===
Through his son Elias, he was the grandfather of Frederick Beasley Ogden (1827–1893), who served as Mayor of Hoboken, New Jersey from 1865 to 1867; Aaron Ogden (1828–1896), who married Harriet Emily Travers; and Susan Dayton Ogden (1831–1878), who married William Shepard Biddle, and were the parents of U.S. Army general John Biddle.

== See also ==
- List of governors of New Jersey
- Gibbons v. Ogden

U.S. Senate
Preceded by James Schureman	U.S. senator (Class 1) from New Jersey; 1801–1803; Served alongside: Jonathan Dayton	Succeeded by John Condit
Political offices
Preceded by Joseph Bloomfield	Governor of New Jersey; 1812–1813	Succeeded by William Sanford Pennington
Non-profit organization positions
Preceded by Thomas Pinckney	President General of the Society of the Cincinnati; 1829–1839	Succeeded by Morgan Lewis
