= Steil =

Steil is a surname. Notable people with the surname include:

- Benn Steil, American economist
- Bryan Steil (born 1981), American politician
- David J. Steil (born 1942), American politician
- Fiona Steil-Antoni (born 1989), Luxembourg chess player
- George Henry Steil Sr. (1861–1926), American politician
- Jennifer Steil (born 1968), American author and journalist
- Marie Henriette Steil (1898–1930), Luxembourg writer and feminist
