= 2017 Hoboken mayoral election =

- November 7, 2017
- Turnout: 43.2%
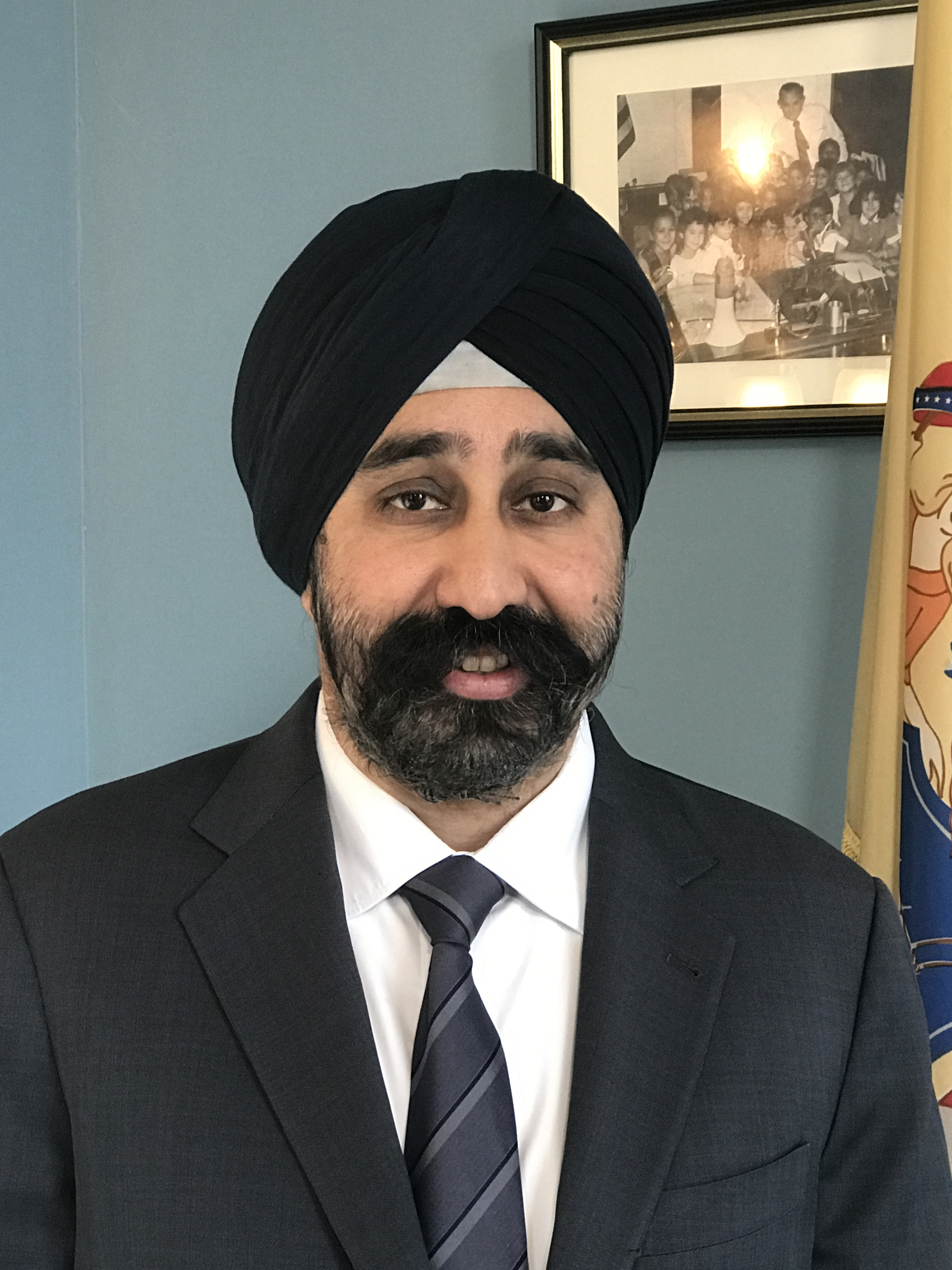
Candidate	Ravinder Bhalla	Michael DeFusco
Party	Nonpartisan	Nonpartisan
Popular vote	5,041	4,557
Percentage	32.75%	29.60%
Candidate	Anthony Romano	Jen Giattino
Party	Nonpartisan	Nonpartisan
Popular vote	2,804	2,537
Percentage	18.21%	16.48%
Mayor before election
Dawn Zimmer
Democratic
Elected mayor
Ravinder Bhalla
Democratic

The Hoboken mayoral election of 2017 was an election to determine the mayor of Hoboken, New Jersey in the term of 2018–2022. The election took place on November 7, 2017. Incumbent mayor Dawn Zimmer announced that she would not run for a third term on June 20, 2017, hoping to pursue climate change issues higher up in the chain of government, and endorsed City Councilman Ravinder Bhalla. On November 7, Bhalla was elected mayor of Hoboken, with 32.75% of the vote, becoming the first Sikh mayor in New Jersey history, and the first turbaned Sikh to be elected mayor in the United States.

== Candidates ==
Six candidates in total ran in the election:

=== Declared ===
- Ronald Bautista, safer streets activist
- Ravinder Bhalla, city councilman, at-large
- Michael DeFusco, city councilman, 1st Ward
- Jen Giattino, city council president, 6th Ward
- Karen Nason, restaurateur
- Anthony Romano, Hudson County freeholder

== Results ==
Hoboken mayoral election, 2017
Party	Candidate	Votes	%
Nonpartisan	Ravi Bhalla	5,041	32.75
Nonpartisan	Michael DeFusco	4,557	29.60
Nonpartisan	Anthony L. Romano	2,804	18.21
Nonpartisan	Jen Giattino	2,537	16.48
Nonpartisan	Karen Nason	237	1.54
Nonpartisan	Ronald Bautista	211	1.37
Write-In	Personal Choice	7	0.05
Total votes		15,394	100.00
