= 2021 Hoboken mayoral election =

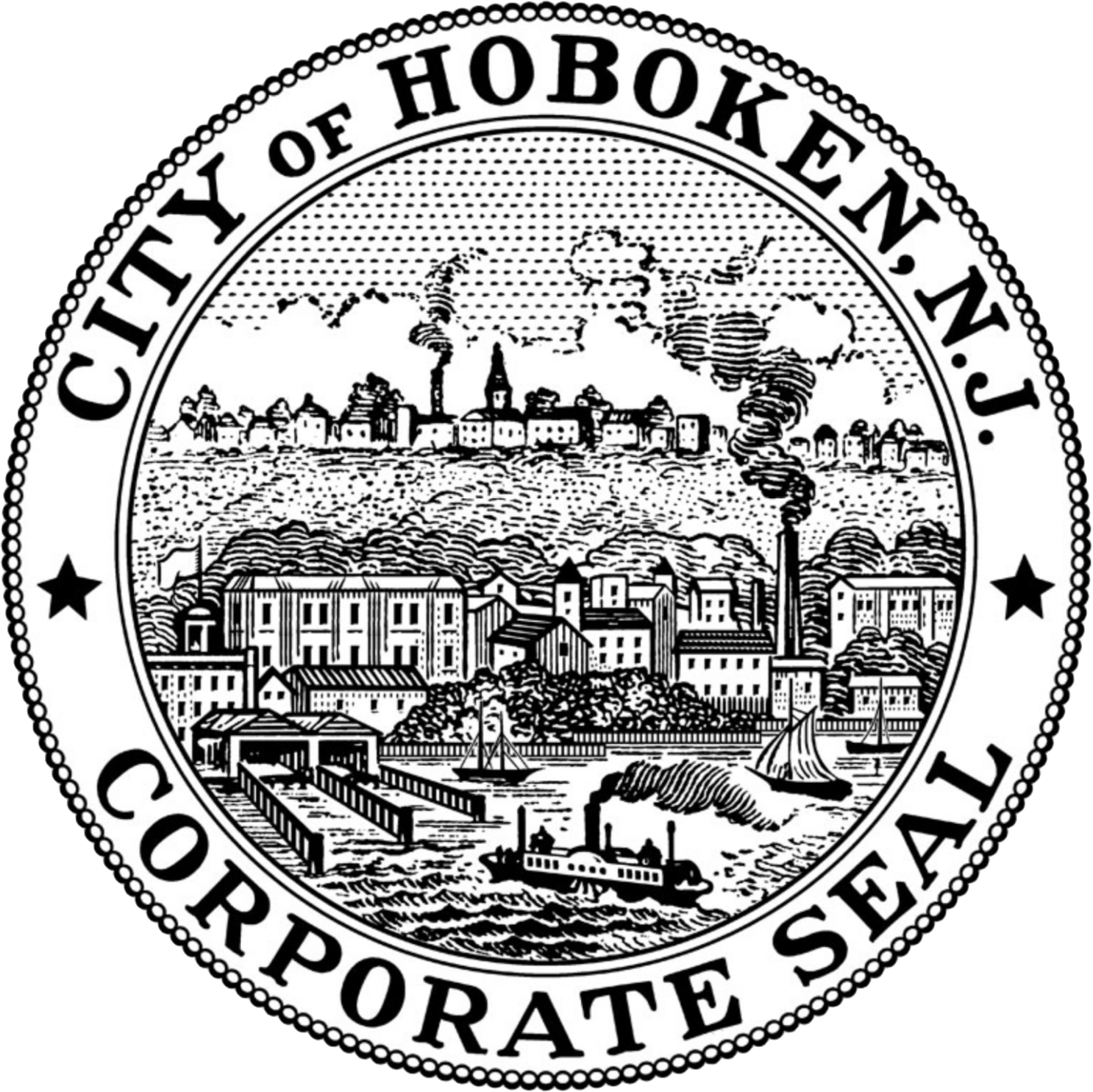
- November 2, 2021
- Turnout: 30.44%
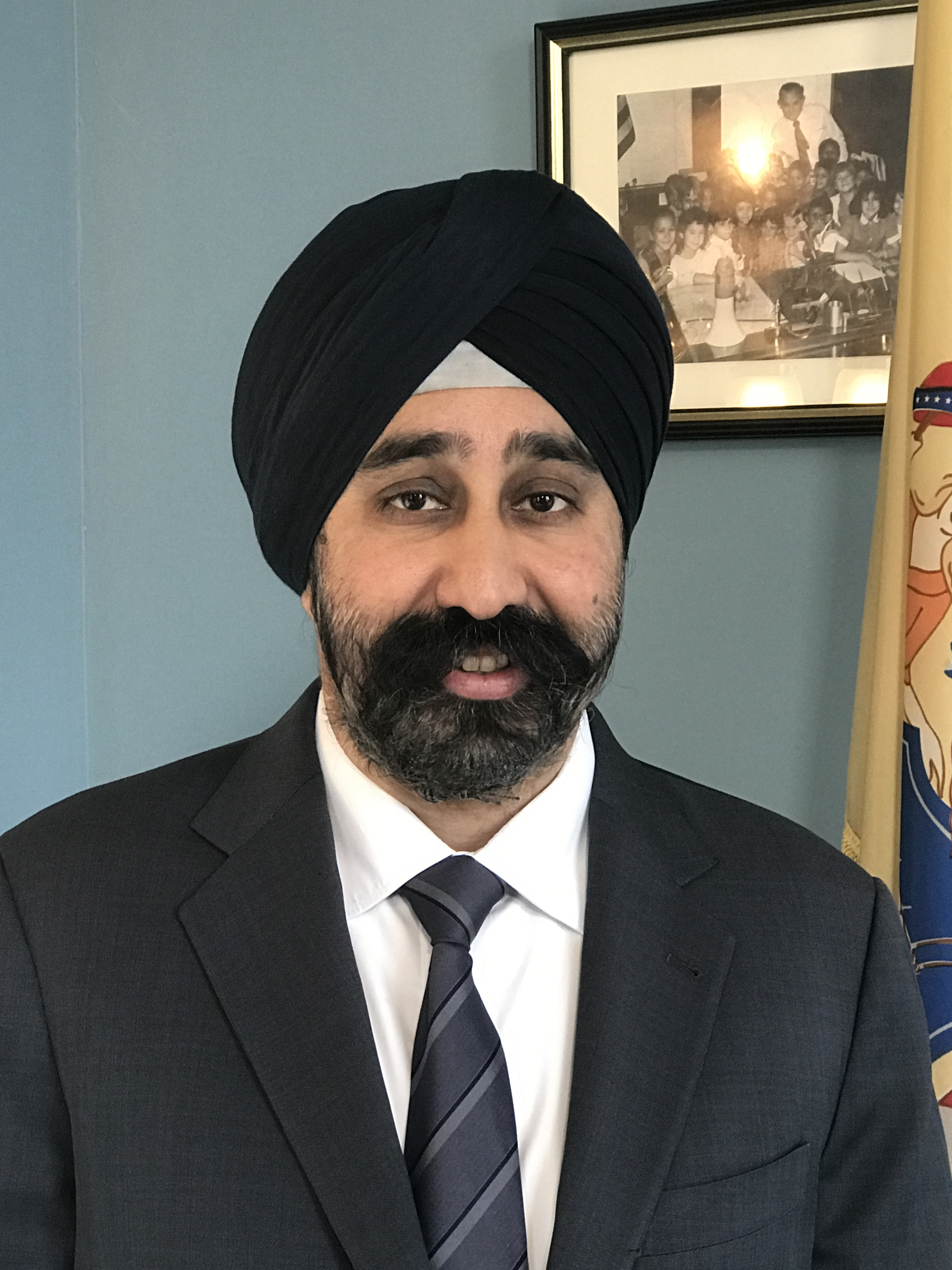

Candidate	Ravinder Bhalla	Write-ins
Party	Nonpartisan	Nonpartisan
Popular vote	8,771	612
Percentage	87.95%	6.52%
Mayor before election
Ravinder Bhalla
Democratic
Elected mayor
Ravinder Bhalla
Democratic

The Hoboken mayoral election of 2021 was an election to determine who would hold the office of Mayor of Hoboken, New Jersey, in the upcoming term of 2022–2026. The election took place on November 2, 2021. Incumbent Mayor Ravinder Bhalla announced that he would seek reelection for a second term on June 3, 2021. Since there were no opponents, Bhalla ran unopposed for reelection for a second term.

== Candidates ==
Incumbent Mayor Ravinder Bhalla was the only person who declared his candidacy for the election. Despite this, Councilmembers Ruben Ramos Jr., Tiffanie Fisher, and Michael Russo as well as former Mayors Dawn Zimmer and David Roberts received write-in votes for mayor.

== Results ==
Results
Party	Candidate	Votes	%
Nonpartisan	Ravinder Bhalla	8,771	93.84
Write-In	Write-in	612	6.52%
Total votes		9,383	100.00%
