= General Biddle =

General Biddle may refer to:

- Anthony Joseph Drexel Biddle Jr. (1897–1961), U.S. Army major general
- John Biddle (United States Army officer) (1859–1936), U.S. Army major general
- William P. Biddle (1853–1923), U.S. Marine Corps major general
