= George Gonzales =

George Gonzales may refer to:

- George Abrán Gonzales, mayor of Santa Fe, New Mexico
- George Washington Gonzales, mayor of Hoboken, New Jersey
