= Elias B. D. Ogden =

American attorney and jurist (1800–1865)

Associate Justice of the Supreme Court of New Jersey
- In office 1848–1865
- Appointed by: Daniel Haines; Rodman M. Price; Charles Smith Olden
- Preceded by: Ira Condict Whitehead
- Succeeded by: Joseph D. Bedle

Personal details
- Born: Elias Bailey Dayton Ogden; May 22, 1800 Elizabethtown, New Jersey
- Died: February 24, 1865, age 64 Elizabethtown, New Jersey
- Party: Democratic
- Spouse(s): Susan Dayton Beasley (m. 1826; died 1848) Louisa Augusta Ford; Alice DeHart
- Children: Frederick B. Ogden
- Education: Princeton University
- Profession: Attorney

Elias Bailey Dayton Ogden (May 22, 1800 – February 24, 1865) was an American attorney and jurist who served three terms as an associate justice of the New Jersey Supreme Court from 1848 until his death in 1865.

== Early life ==
He was the son of Elizabeth Chetwood (1766–1826) and the 5th New Jersey Governor and United States Senator Aaron Ogden (1756–1839). Ogden graduated from Princeton College in 1819.

== Career ==
Immediately after graduation, Ogden began the study of law and was admitted to the bar in 1824, and later was admitted as a counselor in 1829 and Sergeant-at-law in 1837 He practiced law in Paterson, New Jersey and in 1834 was appointed as Prosecutor of the Pleas for Essex County. He was briefly a candidate for Governor of New Jersey in 1843, eventually withdrawing in favor of his first cousin, Daniel Haines.

Ogden was twice elected to the New Jersey State Legislature and was a delegate from Passaic County to the New Jersey Constitutional Convention in 1844.

Ogden served three terms as an associate justice of the New Jersey Supreme Court, first being appointed in 1848, reappointed in 1855, and serving until his death in 1865.

Ogden was a director of the Paterson and Hudson River Railroad at the time of its incorporation in 1831, and was the railroad's president in 1852.

Upon his retirement, he returned to live at his family home in Elizabeth, New Jersey, where he was born, in 1858.

== Personal life ==
On August 23, 1826, Ogden was married to Susan Dayton Beasley (1805–1848), the daughter of Rev. Frederick Beasley. Together, they were the parents of:

- Frederick Beasley Ogden (1827–1893), who married Jane Millen Ford and served as Mayor of Hoboken, New Jersey from 1865 to 1867.
- Aaron Ogden (1828–1896), who married Harriet Emily Travers.
- Susan Dayton Ogden (1831–1878), who married William Shepard Biddle.
- Dayton Ogden (b. 1833), who married Esther Gracie.
- Elizabeth Chetwood Ogden (b. 1835), who married Rev. John Martin Henderson.

After the death of his first wife, he remarried to Louisa Augusta Ford (1820–1857), the daughter of Henry A. Ford. She died soon thereafter in 1857 at the age of 31. Ogden married for the third time to Alice De Hart (d. 1891), daughter of W. Chetwood De Hart.

He died there of pneumonia in 1865.

=== Descednants ===
Through his daughter Susan, he was the grandfather of U.S. Army general John Biddle.
