= Emily Jabbour =

American politician

- Jabbour in 2025

Mayor of Hoboken
- Incumbent
- Assumed office January 15, 2026
- Preceded by: Ravinder Bhalla

Member of the Hoboken City Council Councilmember-at-Large
- In office January 1, 2018 – January 14, 2026

Personal details
- Born: Emily Kate Ball c. 1980 (age 45–46) Boston, Massachusetts, U.S.
- Party: Democratic
- Spouse: Peter W. Jabbour
- Children: 2
- Education: Boston College (BA); Columbia University (MS)

Emily Ball Jabbour (born c. 1980) is an American social worker and politician, serving as the mayor of Hoboken, New Jersey. She previously served as a councilwoman-at-large, a position to which she had been elected in 2017.

On December 2, 2025, she was elected as the 40th mayor of Hoboken, New Jersey, defeating councilperson Michael Russo in a runoff election. Prior to and during her tenure on the City Council, Jabbour worked for the Administration for Children and Families (ACF) division of the United States Department of Health and Human Services.

== Early life ==
Emily Jabbour was born in Boston, Massachusetts, and grew up in the nearby suburb of Wellesley. She received a B.A. in Psychology from Boston College in 2003, and a master's degree from the Columbia School of Social Work in 2006.

== Career ==
=== Federal and social work ===
Jabbour's first employment with the federal government was as a Presidential Management Fellow. She worked as a Health Fellow on a detail assignment with the Health Subcommittee of the House Committee on Energy and Commerce. During her 19 years on the Administration for Children and Families, Jabbour served as a certifying officer and performance officer for the Office of Planning, Research, and Evaluation. In early 2025, Jabbour's employment with the Department of Health and Human Services ended following the closure of the New York City office of the ACF amidst DOGE budgetary cuts.

Jabbour has prioritized an emphasis on public safety throughout her social work career. Following an active shooter drill conducted at her daughter's school, she founded the Hudson County chapter of the gun-violence protection group Moms Demand Action.

=== Politics ===
Emily Jabbour ran for an at-large seat on the Hoboken City Council in 2017. Garnering 11% of the total votes, she successfully qualified for one of the three open seats. She was sworn in on January 1, 2018. Following her first term, she was re-elected to the position four years later in 2021.

In January 2025, Jabbour announced her mayoral campaign for the November 4th election, becoming the first candidate to do so. She ran on a platform of improving government transparency, public transportation, and educational facilities throughout Hoboken. Her campaign was endorsed by the respective president and vice president of the Hoboken City Council, Jim Doyle and Phil Cohen. Receiving 27% of the votes amongst six candidates, she was the highest vote-getter of the election and advanced to a December 2 runoff against 3rd Ward Councilman Michael Russo.

Jabbour was further endorsed by fellow candidate Dini Ajmani and former mayor Dawn Zimmer, among others, following her advancement to the runoff election. Her campaign was ultimately successful, with her winning the runoff election by a seven-percent margin.

== Electoral results ==
2017 Hoboken council-at-large election
Party	Candidate	Votes	%
Nonpartisan	James Doyle	3,902	11.76%
Nonpartisan	Emily Jabbour	3,772	11.36%
Nonpartisan	Vanessa Falco	3,506	10.52%
Nonpartisan	John Allen	3,391	10.22%
Nonpartisan	Michael Flett	3,260	9.82%
Nonpartisan	Andrew Impastato	2,939	8.86%
Nonpartisan	Charles "Buddy" Matthews	1,945	5.86%
Nonpartisan	Angelo Valente	1,930	5.82%
Nonpartisan	James Aibel	1,898	5.72%
Nonpartisan	Jason Ellis	1,704	5.13%
Nonpartisan	Sal Starace	1,560	4.7%
Nonpartisan	David Mello	1,479	4.46%
Nonpartisan	Laini A. Hammond	1,058	3.19%
Nonpartisan	Joshua Einstein	832	2.51%
Write-in		14	0.04%
Total votes		33,190	100.0%

2021 Hoboken council-at-large election
Party	Candidate	Votes	%
Nonpartisan	Emily Jabbour	5,684	19.53%
Nonpartisan	Jim Doyle	5,408	18.58%
Nonpartisan	Joe Quintero	5,286	18.16%
Nonpartisan	Cheryl Fallick	2,920	10.03%
Nonpartisan	Paul Presinzano	2,830	9.72%
Nonpartisan	Sheila Brennan	2,808	9.65%
Nonpartisan	Manuel Rivera	1,175	4.04%
Nonpartisan	Ian Rintel	1,173	4.03%
Nonpartisan	Cindy Wiegand	987	3.39%
Nonpartisan	Patricia Waiters	797	2.74%
Write-in		39	0.13%
Total votes		29,107	100.0%

2025 Hoboken mayoral general election
Party	Candidate	Votes	%
Nonpartisan	Emily Jabbour	5,170	27.0%
Nonpartisan	Michael Russo	4,659	24.3%
Nonpartisan	Tiffanie Fisher	3,674	19.2%
Nonpartisan	Ruben Ramos	2,871	15.0%
Nonpartisan	Dini Ajmani	2,500	13.1%
Nonpartisan	Pat Waiters	172	0.9%
Write-in		113	0.6%
Total votes		19,159	100.0%

2025 Hoboken mayoral runoff
Party	Candidate	Votes	%
Nonpartisan	Emily Jabbour	6,407	53.6%
Nonpartisan	Michael Russo	5,554	46.4%
Write-in		0	0%
Total votes		11,961	100.00
