= Charles T. Perry =

American politician

7th Mayor of Hoboken
- In office April 1864 – April 1865
- Preceded by: Lorenzo W. Elder
- Succeeded by: Frederick B. Ogden

Personal details
- Born: January 10, 1812 Massachusetts
- Died: January 9, 1872 (aged 59)
- Party: Whig; Democratic

Charles T. Perry (January 10, 1812 – January 9, 1872) was an American politician who served as the seventh Mayor of Hoboken, New Jersey, from 1864 to 1865. Perry was a Whig in 1852, but was the Democratic nominee for City Treasurer in 1858 when George W. Morton ran for mayor. He was President of the Hudson County Gaslight Company and a director of the First National Bank of Hoboken.

== Biography ==
He was born on January 10, 1812, in Massachusetts to George Perry. On December 13, 1838, in Sandwich, Massachusetts, he married Caroline Goodson.

He served as the seventh mayor of Hoboken, New Jersey, from 1864 to 1865

By 1867 he was president of the Hudson County Gaslight Company and a director of the First National Bank of Hoboken.

Perry died of a self-inflicted gunshot to the head at 11:00 pm on January 9, 1872.
