= Bohnstedt =

Bohnstedt may refer to:

- Wilhelm Bohnstedt (1888–1947), German general who commanded the 32. Infanterie-Division during World War II
- Frederick W. Bohnstedt (1825–1883), German American Mayor of Hoboken, New Jersey from 1867 to 1869
