= Frederick L. Schmersahl =

11th Mayor of Hoboken
- In office April 1871 – April 1873
- Preceded by: Hazen Kimball
- Succeeded by: Peter McGavisk

Personal details
- Born: 1826 Bremen, Germany
- Died: 1905 (aged 78–79)
- Spouse: Ellen C. (1829–1884)

Frederick L. Schmersahl (January 1825 – about 1905) was a German-American merchant and politician who served two terms as the eleventh mayor of Hoboken, New Jersey, from 1871 to 1873.

== Biography ==
Schmersahl was born in January 1825 in Bremen, Germany. He migrated from Germany to New Jersey in 1845. By 1900 he was living in Weehawken, New Jersey.

He was a partner, along with Louis Wittpenn, in a liquor and wine wholesale business in New York City. He served on the Hoboken City Council in 1866. Schmersahl was rejected by the Hoboken Democratic convention as a candidate for mayor in 1871, but was reported to run independently. He was elected as a Republican in 1871. He raised money for the relief of victims of the Great Chicago Fire. He was re-elected as the candidate of both parties in 1872. Schmersahl ran as an independent candidate in 1873 and was defeated by Democrat Peter McGavisk.

In 1889 he took out an advertisement for a wife and met Clara Theinhardt. She was 30 and he was 63. He made a formal marriage proposal and she accepted. He backed out of the engagement and she sued for breach of promise for $10,000. They settled for an undisclosed amount before trial.
