= Henry Grossbard =

Henry Grossbard was the inventor of the Radiant Cut, a diamond cut similar to the Barrion but with different faceting; he was also the founder of RCDC Corp, marketing the original radiant cut.

Grossbard emigrated to the U.S. from Austria during World War II, and apprenticed with a diamantaire. He later became a master diamond cutter before inventing the Radiant Cut in 1976.

Grossbard died in 2005 in a hit and run accident, while walking his dog on Passover. The killer was never found.

Grossbard's son, Stanley Grossbard, assumed responsibilities for RCDC Corp. following Grossbard's death. Stanley Grossbard is married to Hoboken Mayor Dawn Zimmer.
