= Cornelius V. Clickener =

American politician

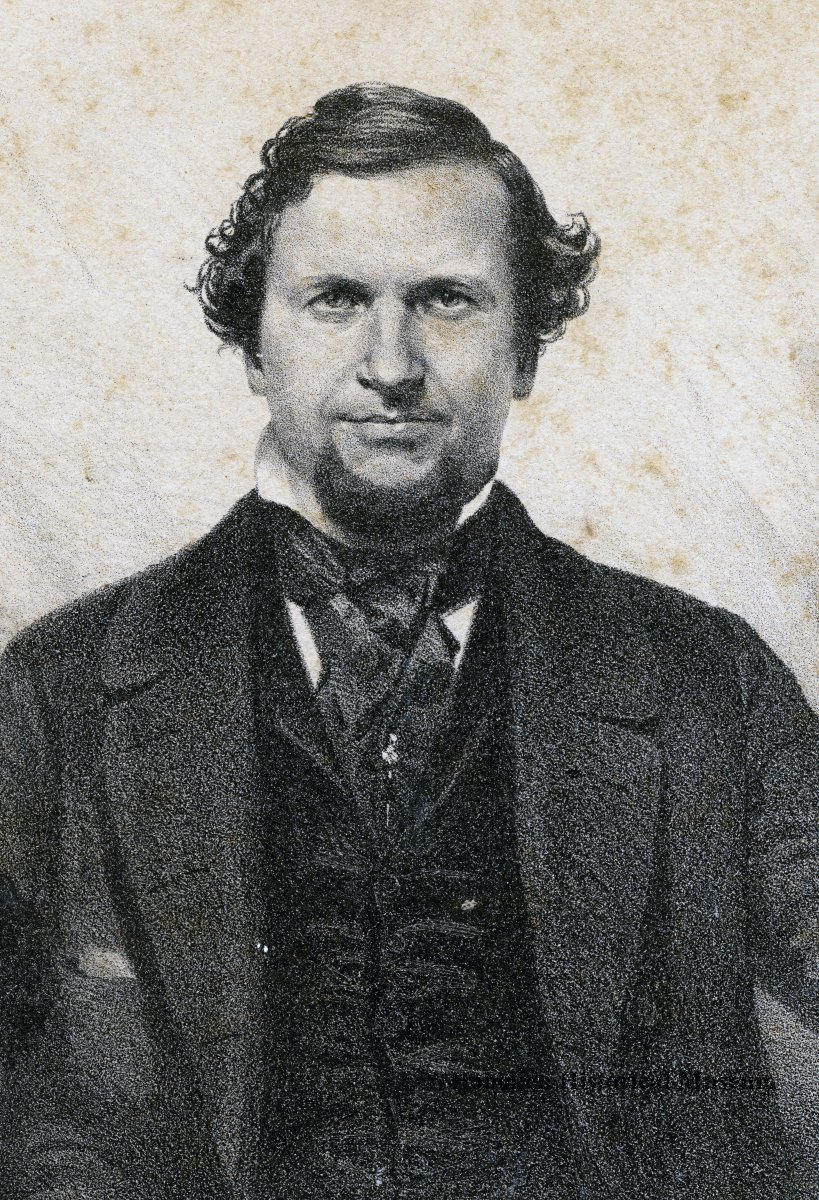

1st Mayor of Hoboken, New Jersey
- In office April 10, 1855 – 1857
- Succeeded by: Franklin B. Carpenter

Personal details
- Born: 1819 New Brunswick, New Jersey
- Died: February 17, 1864 (age 46) Manhattan, New York City
- Party: Democratic

Cornelius V. Clickener (1819 – February 17, 1864) was an American Democratic Party politician who was the first Mayor of Hoboken, serving from 1855 to 1857. He served as a member of New Jersey Senate representing Hudson County from 1857 to 1859.

== Biography ==
He was born in 1819, most likely in New Brunswick, New Jersey. He married Eliza J. (1819-1901) around 1838 in New York.

He had a business in Manhattan, New York City, which in 1852 obtained the rights to sell "Dalley's magical pain extractor", a medicated ointment. Clickener served as director of the Columbia Fire Insurance Company in New York City. In 1855, he spearheaded the effort to incorporate Hoboken as a city. Hoboken residents approved the city charter by a vote of 237 to 185 on March 28, 1855. Clickener was elected as the first mayor of Hoboken on April 10, 1855.

In 1856, Clickener was appointed as Bank Commissioner for the State of New Jersey by Governor Rodman M. Price. He was defeated for re-election for mayor in 1857. A Democrat, he served as a member of the New Jersey Senate from Hudson County from 1857 to 1859.

Clickener died at the age of 46 on February 17, 1864, in Manhattan, New York City. He was buried in Green-Wood Cemetery in Brooklyn, New York.
