= John A. O'Neill =

American politician

15th Mayor of Hoboken
- In office April 1881 – April 1882
- Preceded by: E.V.S. Besson
- Succeeded by: E.V.S. Besson

Personal details
- Born: c. 1837 England
- Died: June 17, 1892 Washington, D.C.
- Party: Democratic

John A. O'Neill (c. 1837 – June 17, 1892) was an American steel engraver and Democratic Party politician. He served as the 15th Mayor of Hoboken, New Jersey.

== Biography ==
He served as a member of the New Jersey General Assembly in 1872; served three terms on the Hudson County Board of Chosen Freeholders in 1869, 1870, and 1873; and one term as the fifteenth mayor of Hoboken, New Jersey, from 1880 to 1881. He was appointed by President Grover Cleveland as the superintendent of the Engraving Division of the Bureau of Engraving and Printing in 1885 and served there until his death in 1892.
