= Franklin B. Carpenter =

American politician

2nd & 4th Mayor of Hoboken, New Jersey
- In office April 1859 – April 1860
- Preceded by: George W. Morton
- Succeeded by: John R. Johnston
- In office April 1857 – April 1858
- Preceded by: Cornelius V. Clickener
- Succeeded by: George W. Morton

Personal details
- Born: February 8, 1818 New York
- Died: April 17, 1863 (aged 45) Paris, France
- Party: Republican

Franklin B. Carpenter (February 8, 1818 – April 17, 1863) was an American lumber merchant and politician who served in the New York State Assembly in 1845 representing Otsego County as well as served for two non-consecutive terms as the second and fourth Mayor of Hoboken, New Jersey, from 1857 to 1858 and 1859 to 1860, and for one term in the New Jersey General Assembly in 1861.

== Biography ==
Carpenter was born in New York on February 8, 1818, to Joseph Carpenter and Hannah Olmstead. He served in the New York State Assembly from Otsego County in the 68th New York State Legislature in 1845. He served non-consecutive terms as the second and fourth mayor of Hoboken, New Jersey, from 1857 to 1858 and 1859 to 1860, and one term in the New Jersey General Assembly in 1861. He died on April 17, 1863, in Paris, France.
