= Martin Cooke (mayor) =

American politician

24th Mayor of Hoboken
- In office 1912–1915
- Preceded by: George Washington Gonzales
- Succeeded by: Patrick R. Griffin

Personal details
- Born: 1872
- Died: July 31, 1944 (aged 71–72) Hoboken, New Jersey

Martin Cooke was a master butcher who became the Mayor of Hoboken, New Jersey, serving from 1912 to 1915.

== Biography ==
He was born in 1872. He married Helen Shugrue and had a son, Martin W. Cooke.

He had served as the Fire Commissioner of Hoboken, Tax Commissioner of Hoboken and member of the Tax Appeals Board, and was a Hudson County Freeholder in 1910. In August 1912, a crowbar dropped by a workman working at the Old Court House, narrowly missed striking the mayor. He was Mayor of Hoboken, New Jersey, from 1912 to 1915.

Starting in 1932 he was custodian of the Hudson County Court House.

He died on July 31, 1944, in Hoboken, New Jersey.
