= Fagan Iron Works =

- Company type: Private
- Industry: Architectural Iron Works, Iron Foundry
- Predecessor: Mansfield & Fagan
- Founded: 1891 in Hoboken, New Jersey
- Fate: Defunct
- Headquarters: Jersey City, New Jersey, U.S.
- Owner: Lawrence Fagan

The Fagan Iron Works was an iron foundry owned by Lawrence Fagan located in Hudson County, New Jersey at the turn of the 20th century. Initially located in Hoboken, the main foundry was later moved to Jersey City. Many of the characteristic iron storefronts that line Washington Street were produced by Fagan Iron Works. Notably, the architectural iron for Hoboken City Hall was supplied by Mansfield & Fagan, the predecessor to the Fagan Iron Works.

== Origins ==
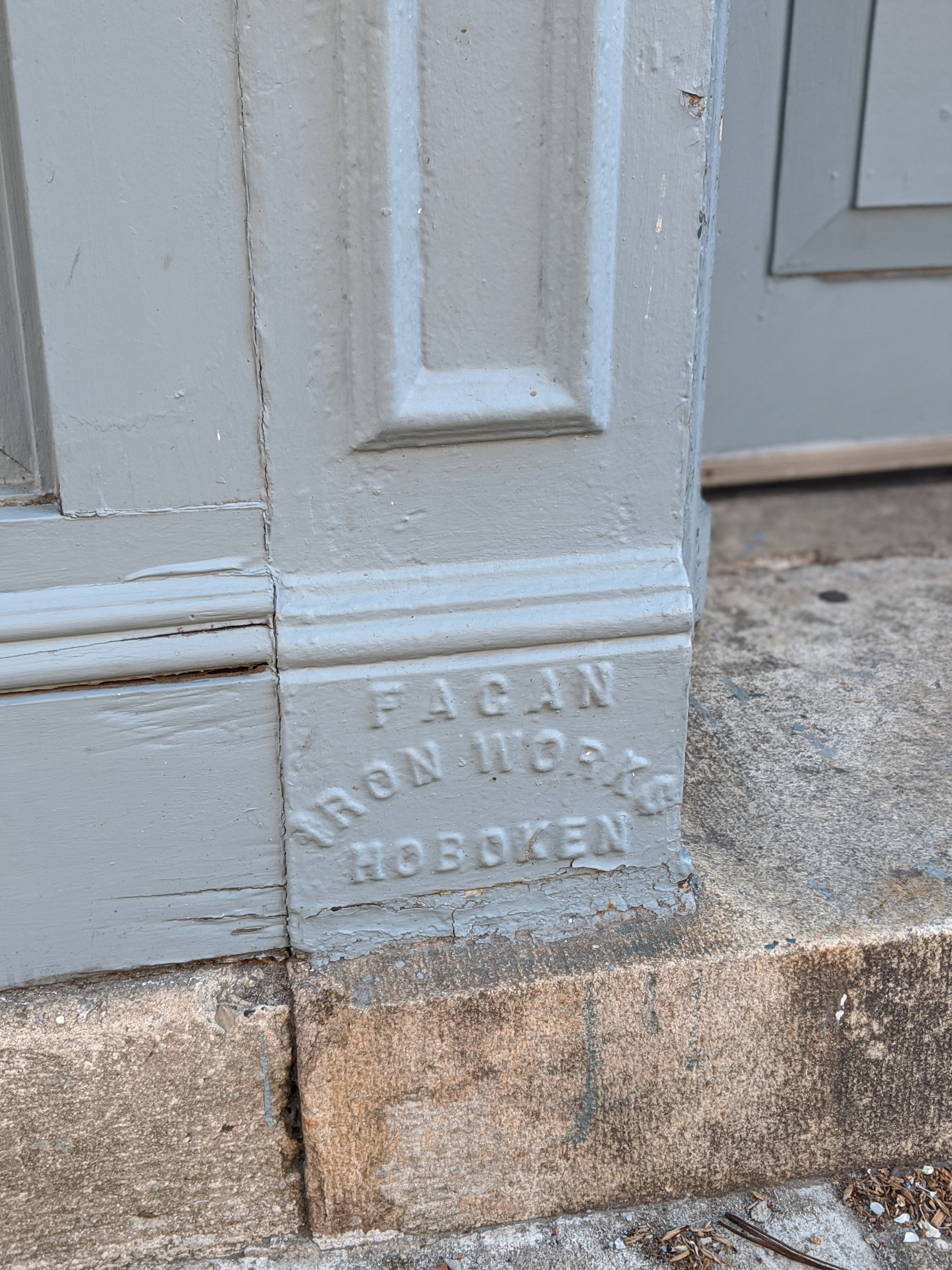
Foundry Mark of Fagan Iron Works, Located on Washington Street, in Hoboken, NJ

Following Lawrence Fagan's early employment with Hoboken foundry Mansfield & Scudder, Lawrence Fagan was admitted as a partner to the firm and the firm was named Mansfield & Fagan. In 1891, Lawrence Fagan purchased Issac Mansfield's interests in the firm and the firm was renamed Fagan Iron Works.

== Fire ==
On May 2, 1905, a fire destroyed the entire Fagan Iron Works plant on 13th and 14th Streets, and Coles and Monmouth Streets in Jersey City. The fire destroyed the foundry, store house, and pattern shop, resulting in the loss of over 3,000 casting patterns. Lawrence Fagan was traveling back from a trip to Europe aboard the SS Kaiser Wilhelm der Grosse when he received the news.

The plant was foreclosed on October 21, 1927, for failure to make payment on $230,445.26. In August 1931, the Hoboken Land and Improvement Company took title to the plant, which occupied two blocks bounded by Coles Street, Monmouth Street, Thirteenth Street, and Fifteenth Streets in Jersey City. Today, the land is covered by an elevated merge of Route 78 and the Pulaski Skyway leading to the entrance of the Holland Tunnel.
