= Frederick W. Bohnstedt =

American politician

9th Mayor of Hoboken
- In office April 1867 – April 1869
- Preceded by: Frederick B. Ogden
- Succeeded by: Hazen Kimball

Personal details
- Born: c. 1825
- Died: c. 1883
- Party: Democratic

Frederick W. Bohnstedt (c. 1825 in Germany – c. 1883) was an American jurist and Democratic party politician who served as the ninth Mayor of Hoboken, New Jersey from 1867 to 1869.

He was naturalized on October 22, 1852. In 1858 he was the Democratic party nominee for City Collector.

He was elected the coroner for Hoboken, New Jersey in 1861. His election as coroner served as an early example of German American political success in a city that was dominated by the Irish American political machine at that time.

In 1864 he was secretary of the county Democratic convention

He served as a judge for the New Jersey Court of Common Pleas in 1867 before running for mayor.

He was nominated for Mayor of Hoboken, New Jersey in 1867.

Bohnstedt was commissioned as a lieutenant colonel in the Hudson Brigade of the New Jersey Militia in 1868.

By 1870 he was a circuit judge.

Bohnstedt was an unsuccessful candidate for mayor in 1879 losing to Elbridge Van Syckel Besson.

He died around 1883.

== See also ==
- Frederick W. Bohnstedt in the 1870 census
