= Thomas Vezzetti =

American politician

Thomas F. Vezzetti

33rd Mayor of Hoboken
- In office July 1, 1985 – March 2, 1988
- Preceded by: Steve Cappiello
- Succeeded by: Patrick Pasculli

Personal details
- Born: 1928 Bradley Beach, NJ, U.S.
- Died: March 2, 1988 (aged 59–60) Hoboken, NJ, U.S.
- Party: Democratic
- Children: None

Thomas F. Vezzetti (1928 – March 2, 1988) was the 33rd mayor of Hoboken, New Jersey, and served as mayor from 1985 until his death in 1988. He fought against the gentrification of the city.

== Biography ==
Vezzetti was born in 1928 in Bradley Beach, New Jersey along with his twin sister, Louise. He said his father was a bootlegger who owned five saloons in New Jersey.

In the 1985 Hoboken mayoral election, Thomas Vezzetti narrowly defeated Steve Cappiello, who had been the mayor of Hoboken since 1973. Vezzetti received 6,990 votes and Cappiello received 6,647 votes in the 1985 election, which put Vezzetti in the mayor's office. Capiello's support for gentrification and his attribution of several arsons to a purported tradition of Puerto Rican revenge burnings resulted in many Puerto Rican residents voting for Vezetti.

The New York Daily News called Vezzetti "The Wackiest Mayor in America" because of the odd things he did, like reporting a car stolen that ended up exactly where he had last parked it two months earlier. Vezzetti was known for eccentric behavior such as wearing mismatched shoes, and carrying all his belongings in two paper bags.

On March 2, 1988, Vezzetti had a heart attack and died at Hoboken's St. Mary Hospital. He had never married.

== Legacy ==
Patrick Pasculli succeeded him as the Mayor of Hoboken. A street was named after Vezzetti by Mayor Anthony Russo in the late 1990s. "Vezzetti Way" ran parallel to Observer Highway. Mayor Dawn Zimmer later eliminated Vezzetti Way and replaced it with a bicycle lane.
