= Patrick Pasculli =

American politician (1947–2026)

34th Mayor of Hoboken
- In office 1988–1993
- Preceded by: Thomas Vezzetti
- Succeeded by: Anthony Russo

Personal details
- Born: August 10, 1947 St. Louis, Missouri, U.S.
- Died: March 6, 2026 (aged 78)
- Party: Democratic

Patrick L. Pasculli (August 10, 1947 – March 6, 2026) was an American Democratic Party politician who served as the 34th mayor of his native Hoboken, New Jersey, from 1988 to 1993.

== Life and career ==
Pasculli was born on August 10, 1947, and was reared in Hoboken.

He was serving as president of the Hoboken City Council at the time of the death of Mayor Thomas Vezzetti in 1988. Pasculli was elected by the city council to serve as acting mayor. He resigned his seat on the Council, and was elected to a full term in 1989.

Pasculli ran for mayor in 1989 on the promise to open the Hoboken waterfront to development. Pasculli's campaign led to the formation of the Coalition for a Better Waterfront which opposed his plan to lease city-owned land to the Port Authority of New York and New Jersey for commercial development. In 1992, when General Foods announced the closing of a 600 employee facility, Pasculli noted that the departure left the city with little business on the property immortalized in On the Waterfront.

In 1990, he proclaimed that Hoboken's Elysian Fields was the site of the first game of baseball on June 19, 1846, dismissing the claim by Cooperstown, New York.

Pasculli died on March 6, 2026, at the age of 78.
