= Frederick B. Ogden =

American attorney, jurist, and politician (1827-1893)

Frederick Beasley Ogden

8th Mayor of Hoboken
- In office April 1865 – April 1867
- Preceded by: Charles T. Perry
- Succeeded by: Frederick W. Bohnstedt

Personal details
- Born: July 20, 1827 Paterson, New Jersey
- Died: November 1, 1893 (aged 66) Hoboken, New Jersey
- Party: Democratic party
- Spouse: Jane Millen Ford
- Education: Princeton University (1847)

Frederick Beasley Ogden (July 20, 1827 - November 1, 1893) was an American attorney, jurist, and politician who served as the eighth Mayor of Hoboken, New Jersey from 1865 to 1867.

== Biography ==
He was born on July 20, 1827, in Paterson, New Jersey. He was the son of New Jersey Supreme Court Justice Elias B. D. Ogden. He was the grandson of United States Senator and New Jersey Governor Aaron Ogden.

Ogden graduated from Princeton University in 1847 and was admitted to the bar in New Jersey in 1850.

He opened his office in Hoboken, New Jersey in December 1853. On July 4, 1865, he joined the Society of the Cincinnati. He married Jane Millen Ford.

He served as the eighth Mayor of Hoboken, New Jersey from 1865 to 1867 when he replaced Charles T. Perry. He was succeeded by Frederick W. Bohnstedt. He then served as a judge in the District Court for Hoboken.

He died on November 1, 1893, from an "attack of paralysis".
