= Adolph Lankering =

Mayor of Hoboken, New Jersey, US

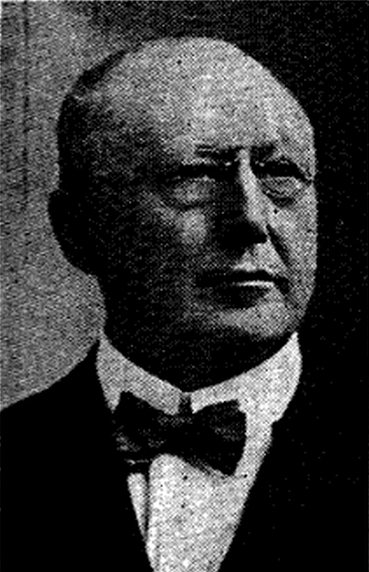

23rd Mayor of Hoboken
- In office 1902–1906
- Preceded by: Lawrence Fagan
- Succeeded by: George H. Steil

Personal details
- Born: January 9, 1851 Verden an der Aller, Kingdom of Hanover
- Died: February 4, 1937 (aged 86) Christ Hospital; Jersey City, New Jersey

Adolph Lankering (January 9, 1851 – February 4, 1937) was the mayor of Hoboken, New Jersey, from 1902 to 1906. He was the postmaster for Hoboken starting in 1916.

== Biography ==
He was born in January 1850 in Verden an der Aller, Kingdom of Hanover to Heinrich Lankering and Matilde Germann. In 1869 he served in the German Army and in 1871 he became the army paymaster.

In 1875, he migrated to Chicago, Illinois, where he worked for Sandhagen & Co. in the cigar trade. He married Louise Fistedt of Milwaukee, Wisconsin, in 1883 in Chicago. He moved to Hoboken, New Jersey, and founded the Lankering Cigar Co. with his two brothers.

He was the police commissioner for Hoboken in 1900. He was elected the mayor of Hoboken, New Jersey, from 1902 to 1906.

He died on February 4, 1937, at Christ Hospital in Jersey City, New Jersey.
