= Lorenzo W. Elder =

American physician and politician (1820–1892)

Lorenzo Welton Elder

6th Mayor of Hoboken
- In office April 1863 – April 1864
- Preceded by: John R. Johnston
- Succeeded by: Charles T. Perry

Personal details
- Born: April 15, 1820 Guilford, New York, U.S.
- Died: May 11, 1892 (aged 72) Hoboken, New Jersey, U.S.
- Resting place: Woodlawn Cemetery
- Party: Democratic
- Spouse: Helen Hall Craige

Lorenzo Welton Elder (April 15, 1820 - May 11, 1892) was an American physician and politician who served as the sixth mayor of Hoboken, New Jersey, from 1863 to 1864 during the American Civil War. It was through his efforts that the Hudson County Board of Health was established. He was president of the Hudson County Pathology Society and was deputy adjutant-general on the staff of Governor Rodman McCamley Price. He was the local medical examiner of the Mutual Benefit Life Insurance Company of Newark, New Jersey, and of the New York Life Insurance Company. He was three times elected as the tax commissioner for Hoboken.

== Biography ==
Elder was born in Guilford, New York, on April 15, 1820. He attended Columbia University College of Physicians and Surgeons, graduating in 1847.

From 1851 to 1861 he was the brigade surgeon for the New Jersey Army National Guard. In 1853 he married Helen Hall Craig of Philadelphia. In 1853 he was the "commissioner for taking the acknowledgment and proof of deeds" for Hoboken. From 1859 to 1863 he was the superintendent of the Hoboken Public Schools. From 1870 to 1872 he was an attending physician at the Hudson County Hospital and was the health commissioner and president of the board of health and vital statistics for Hudson County, New Jersey.

He died on May 11, 1892, in Hoboken, New Jersey. He was buried in Woodlawn Cemetery.
