= George Washington Gonzales =

25th mayor of Hoboken, New Jersey

25th Mayor of Hoboken
- Opponent: Lawrence Fagan
- Preceded by: George H. Steil Sr.
- Succeeded by: Martin Cooke

Personal details
- Died: January 25, 1946 Schooley's Mountain, NJ
- Children: 7

George Washington Gonzales was the 25th Mayor of Hoboken, New Jersey. He was elected to City Council in 1908, holding the office to 1909. He was elected Mayor of Hoboken in 1910, holding office until 1911.

He was the proprietor of the American Hotel and Oyster Bar at 76-82 River Street in Hoboken, NJ (Home to "Texas Arizona" as of 2019). Records indicate that hotel was celebrating its 50th anniversary around May 13, 1933, and photographs show it in operation until at least 1946. Much of the information known about Gonzales originates from a 1933 newspaper clipping, however it is not currently known which publication it originated from.

== Life and career ==
Records indicate that Gonzales was born in Brooklyn, New York and moved to Hoboken in 1874. He went to work for Mr. Joseph O'Brien, owner of "O'Brien's Chop House", which would later become the American Hotel and Oyster Bar when Gonzales purchased control of the hotel in 1887, following O'Brien's death.

Gonzales was listed as the President of the Board of Trustees (ex-officio) for the Hoboken Public Library in its 20th Annual Report. City records indicate that, in 1911, he held the role of President of the Board of Police Commissioners, Trustee for the Hoboken Cemetery (ex-officio), and Member, Board of Education (ex-officio).

== Family ==
Gonzales was known to have eleven children, including seven girls and 4 boys. In 1933, Florence Gonzales was known to be teacher at Hoboken School No. 2. Claire Gonzales was a teacher at Hoboken School No. 5, and Georgine Gonzales was a teacher at Hoboken School No. 9 (Now known as the Thomas G Connors Primary School). Joseph Gonzales assisted in running the family business. His son, Frank Gonzales, was indicted for auto theft in 1914 at the age of 22.

Walter Gonzales was a physician in Hoboken, operating out of his family home on 638 Hudson Street, as well as a member of the Hoboken Hospital Staff. Hoboken City records indicate that he was a "Physician (Baby Welfare)" in the city's Department of Health as of 1934. He died of Pneumonia at the age of 39 in 1938, leaving behind his wife, Mrs. Edna Cox Gonzales and his children Janet and George.
