= Anthony Russo (mayor) =

American mayor (1946–2021)

35th Mayor of Hoboken
- In office 1993–2001
- Preceded by: Patrick Pasculli
- Succeeded by: David Roberts

Personal details
- Born: December 22, 1946 Hoboken, New Jersey, U.S.
- Died: April 19, 2021 (aged 74) Hoboken, New Jersey, U.S.
- Spouse: Michele Russo
- Children: 3

Anthony Russo (December 22, 1946 – April 19, 2021) was the 35th mayor of Hoboken, New Jersey, serving from 1993 to 2001, during which he prioritized improving the city's infrastructure and revitalizing its downtown area. He was especially instrumental in securing funding for a new light rail station, which has greatly enhanced transportation options for both residents and visitors. One of Mayor Russo's most significant achievements was the development of the South Waterfront area in Hoboken. With the support of the Hoboken Waterfront Corporation, he collaborated with professional planners to create a South Waterfront Redevelopment Plan that limited how much could be built in the area. This plan aligned with the principles of the anti-development group Fund for a Better Waterfront and resulted in the conversion of all land and piers along the river into a public park, including the widely popular Pier C Park. Mayor Russo played a crucial role in securing funding from the Port Authority for the park's construction, which features innovative play equipment for children. As a former teacher, Russo worked to ensure that Hoboken's schools provided high-quality education to students.

== Biography ==
In the 1993 election that got him into office, Russo beat his main opponent, Ira Karasick, by 7,023 to 5,623 votes. During his two terms, he appointed people dedicated to revitalizing the city of Hoboken in government including the Hoboken municipal boards.

Russo was credited with hiring Municipal directors with the goal of shrinking and eventually eliminating Hoboken's structural budget deficit and expanding the tax base. Investment in Hoboken's housing stock soared under Russo's administration and the long dormant waterfront was built with first class office, hotel and residential space. Part of the waterfront redevelopment plan included the creation of large waterfront parks, including Pier A and Frank Sinatra Park. This gave Hoboken residents their first public access to the Hudson River waterfront in decades.

In 2000, it was discovered that Russo had a brain tumor. His medical team said he would only live another few months, but he was successful at fighting off the cancer.

Councilman David Roberts defeated Russo for mayor in the 2001 election. Roberts capitalized on Russo's illness and a major coalition of Russo foes throughout Hoboken and Hudson county circles. In 2002, the tumor went into remission, and because of this the doctors told Russo he could run for office again. He ran for 3rd Ward Council, but had to tearfully resign shortly after being elected because the cancer reappeared.

He was charged with corruption in 2003 while a Hoboken city councilman.

Unrelated to his cancer, Russo died on April 18, 2021, at the age of 74.
