= George Henry Steil Sr. =

Mayor of Hoboken, New Jersey (1861–1926)

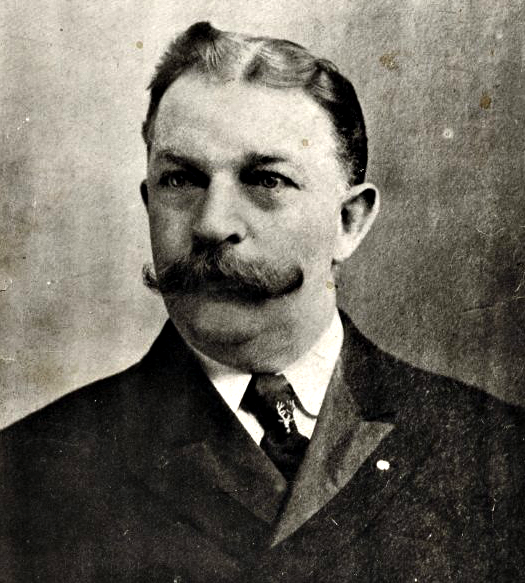
- Steil in 1909

Mayor of Hoboken, New Jersey
- In office 1905–1909
- Preceded by: Adolph Lankering
- Succeeded by: George Washington Gonzales

Personal details
- Born: March 29, 1861 Hoboken, New Jersey
- Died: October 25, 1926 (aged 65) Hoboken, New Jersey
- Party: Democratic
- Children: George Henry Steil Jr.

George Henry Steil Sr. (March 29, 1861 – October 25, 1926) was the Mayor of Hoboken, New Jersey, from 1905 to 1909.

== Biography ==
He was born on March 29, 1861, in Hoboken, New Jersey, to X Steil and Catherine Ducker. He married Margaret Sanderson Daniels of New Orleans in 1889. He was the Mayor of Hoboken, New Jersey, starting in 1905 when he replaced Adolph Lankering. In the 1905 election he beat Joseph Francis Xavier Stack, the Republican candidate. He served until 1909 when he was defeated in the election by George Washington Gonzales. He died on October 25, 1926. He was 65 years old.
