= Bernard N. McFeely =

27th mayor of Hoboken, New Jersey (1882 – 1949)

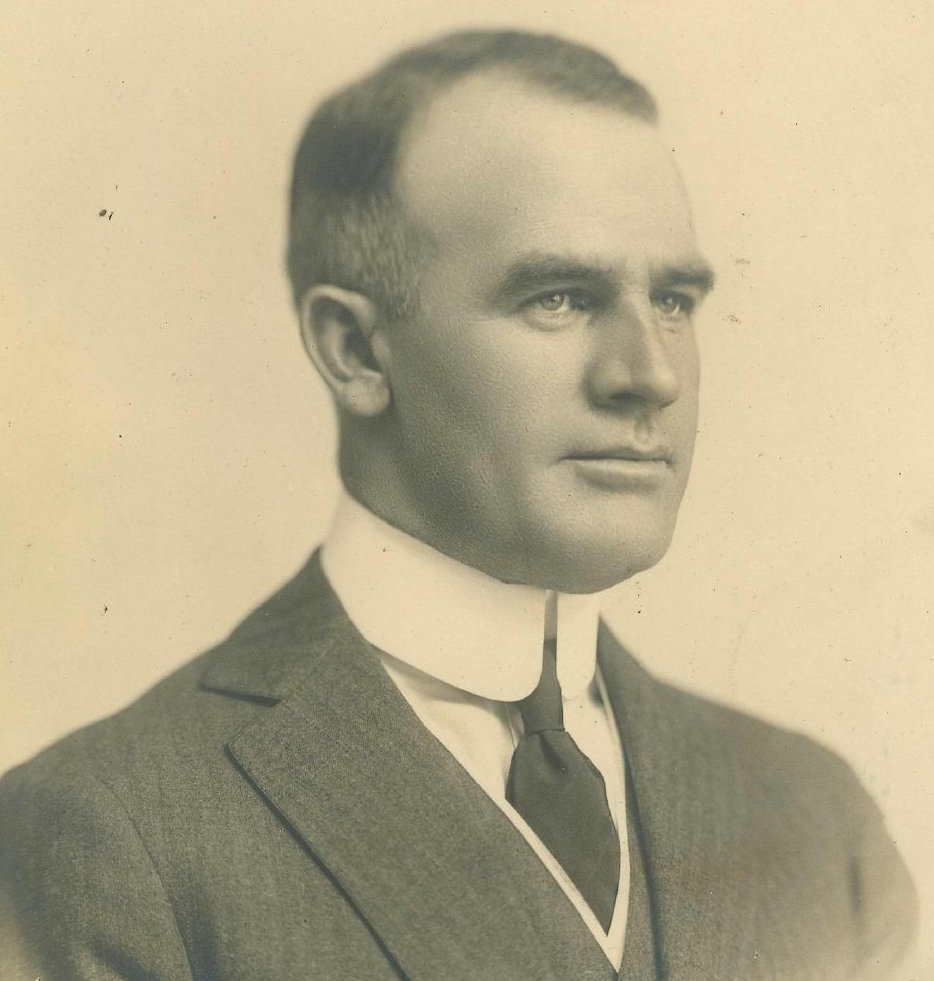

27th Mayor of Hoboken
- In office 1930–1947
- Preceded by: Gustav Bach
- Succeeded by: Fred M. De Sapio

Personal details
- Born: April 7, 1882; Hoboken, New Jersey
- Died: August 8, 1949 (aged 67); Hoboken, New Jersey
- Political party: Democratic

Bernard Nicholas "Barney" McFeely (April 7, 1882 – August 8, 1949) was an American Democratic Party politician who served as the 27th mayor of Hoboken, New Jersey, from 1930 to 1947.

== Early life ==
McFeely was born in Hoboken, New Jersey, the son of Irish immigrants, Bernard McFeely Sr. and Mary Curley. His father was a butcher, and his mother started a horse-drawn garbage-trucking business. The business won the garbage removal contract for the city of Hoboken, and the lucrative contract remained with the family when McFeely served as mayor.

== Political career ==
In 1915, when Hoboken adopted a commission form of government under the Walsh Act, McFeely was elected to the original commission, serving as Commissioner of Public Safety. He succeeded Mayor Patrick R. Griffin as the Democratic leader of the city in 1926, allying himself with the powerful mayor of Jersey City and Hudson County political boss, Frank Hague. In 1930, he was named mayor by his fellow commissioners, filling the vacancy left by Gustav Bach, who had been appointed Hudson County clerk.

McFeely's tenure as mayor was noted for rampant nepotism. He appointed his brother, Edward J. McFeely, to be chief of police. His nephew, Thomas F. McFeely, served as superintendent of the Hoboken school system. By the end of his time in office, dozens of other relatives were said to be on the city payroll, appointed to various positions. The family trash business maintained the city's garbage removal contract, continuing to use horse-drawn carts into the 1940s.

In 1946, McFeely was indicted by a grand jury on charges of conspiring with ten other city and police officials to oppress a group of Hoboken police officers who had sued for overtime pay due to them for working seven days a week during World War II. The defendants included his brother Edward, the chief of police, as well as two nephews, who served as deputy police chief and a police captain. McFeeley's attacks on the "rebel" police officers led to the formation of a Fusion ticket to oppose the mayor's Democratic organization in the 1947 election for city commission.

McFeely and his Democratic machine were defeated by the Fusion ticket in May 1947, and Fred M. De Sapio succeeded him as mayor. McFeely's unexpected defeat contributed to Frank Hague's decision to announce his retirement from politics shortly thereafter.

McFeely was scheduled to go on trial in the police case shortly after the 1947 election. However, trial was postponed several times due to illness. He was still under indictment when he died on August 8, 1949, at the age of 67. He never married.
