= Hazen Kimball =

American politician

10th Mayor of Hoboken
- In office April 1869 – April 1871
- Preceded by: Frederick W. Bohnstedt
- Succeeded by: Frederick H. Schmersahl

Personal details
- Born: February 19, 1835 Barton, Vermont
- Died: June 22, 1890 (aged 55) Hoboken, New Jersey
- Spouse: Eliza Nye

Hazen Kimball (February 19, 1835 - June 22, 1890) was an American merchant, banker, and politician who served as the tenth Mayor of Hoboken, New Jersey, from 1869 to 1871. Kimball was vice president of the First National Bank of Hoboken and president of the Gansevoort Bank of New York.

== Biography ==
He was born on February 19, 1835, in Barton, Vermont.

He served as the tenth Mayor of Hoboken, New Jersey, from 1869 to 1871. Prior to the 1869 vote concerning consolidation with Jersey City, Kimball asserted the health of his city: "Hoboken keeps pace at least, if it does not goes beyond, our sister cities in rapid increase of population and wealth." Unlike Bergen City and Hudson City, Hoboken chose to remain independent.

He was vice president of the First National Bank of Hoboken and president of the Gansevoort Bank of New York.

He died on June 22, 1890, of apoplexy in Hoboken, New Jersey.
