= Lawrence Fagan =

American politician

22nd Mayor of Hoboken
- In office April 1893 – April 1901
- Preceded by: William Ellis
- Succeeded by: Adolph Lankering

Personal details
- Born: January 1, 1851 Dublin, Ireland
- Died: May 9, 1921 (aged 70) Hoboken, New Jersey
- Children: John J Fagan

Lawrence Fagan (January 1, 1851 - May 9, 1921) was an American business owner and Democratic politician who served as the twenty-second mayor of Hoboken, New Jersey, and served in the New Jersey General Assembly for two terms from 1889 to 1890.

== Biography ==
Fagan was born on New Year's Day, January 1, 1851, in Dublin, Ireland and emigrated to the United States with his parents as a child. After being educated in public schools, Fagan became a blacksmith's apprentice. In 1872, Fagan partnered with Issac Mansfield to form Architectural Iron Works, a manufacturing company which provided structural and decorative iron. He served as a volunteer fireman, and became interested in politics. Fagan was elected to the New Jersey General Assembly in 1888 and served two terms. While an Assemblyman, Fagan became known for his proposal to split Hudson County by allowing the northern towns to secede and form a new Hamilton County.

Fagan was a co-founder and part owner of the "Hoboken Observer" newspaper in 1893, which later became the "Hudson Observer"

He was indicted by a grand jury in 1899.

He died on May 9, 1921, at his home on 1000 Hudson Street, Hoboken, NJ.

== Political career ==
Fagan first entered politics as the Democratic candidate for the NJ House of Assembly in 1888. His opponent was William Letts. During his first term, he was a member of the committees on ways and means, municipal corporations, unfinished businesses, State Library, and Soldier's Home. Fagan was part of a movement to divide Hudson county into two parts, naming the southern half "Hamilton County" after Alexander Hamilton. He was re-elected in both 1889 and 1890.

On April 1, 1893, Lawrence Fagan was elected the mayor of Hoboken, having received 3463 of the 6,123 total votes. His opponent was John H. Tangemann. Fagan was elected in April 1893 as a reform candidate against the Hudson County political machine known as the "Ring." He was re-elected in 1895, 1897, and 1899. He did not run again for several years, having re-entered politics to campaign for Hoboken Mayor again. He lost to Republican Opponent George Gonzales, giving him his first political defeat.

== Fagan Iron Works ==
Following his partnership with Issac Mansfield, Lawrence Fagan became the proprietor of the Fagan Iron Works, a prominent foundry located initially in Hoboken, and later relocated to Jersey City. Fagan Iron Works supplied many of the characteristic architectural iron store fronts in Hoboken, as well as iron railings for brownstone and tenement buildings. As of 1897, The Fagan Iron Works were located at 309 Jefferson Street, in Hoboken. Later, the Fagan Iron Works were moved to Jersey city, located on two square blocks under what is now the ramp from Route 1&9 and Rt. 78 entering the Holland Tunnel. The Property was bounded by Coles and Monmouth Streets, and 13th and 15th Streets in Jersey City. The Fagan Iron Works burned during the night between May 2 and May 3, 1905.
