= George W. Morton =

American politician

George William Morton

3rd Mayor of Hoboken
- In office April 1858 – April 1859
- Preceded by: Franklin B. Carpenter
- Succeeded by: Franklin B. Carpenter

Personal details
- Born: July 5, 1793 Manhattan, New York City
- Died: May 7, 1865 (aged 71) Hoboken, New Jersey
- Party: Democratic

George William Morton (July 5, 1793 – May 7, 1865) was an American politician who served as the Clerk of the Court for the United States District Court for the Southern District of New York under Judge Samuel Betts. He was the third Mayor of Hoboken, New Jersey, from 1858 to 1859.

== Biography ==
He was born on July 5, 1793, in New York City, to Jacob Morton and Catherine Ludlow. He later married Caroline Augusta Denning.

Morton served as the first Treasurer of Hoboken, New Jersey, being elected in the 1855 Charter election. He was appointed as a Water Commissioner in 1857. Morton was the Democratic nominee for mayor in 1858. He served a single term and was defeated by his predecessor in the 1859 election.

Morton was the Clerk of the Court for the United States District Court for the Southern District of New York under Judge Samuel Betts.

He died on May 7, 1865, in Hoboken, New Jersey.
