= W. Drake McFeely =

W. Drake McFeely (born c. 1954) is the chairman and president of the independent and employee-owned American publisher W. W. Norton & Company, Inc.

== Education and career ==
McFeely attended Phillips Exeter Academy and earned his B.A. in Fine Arts from Amherst College in 1976. After graduation, he was hired by W. W. Norton as a college sales representative. He was named an editor in 1982, a vice president in 1990, and was associate director of the college division from 1993 to 1994. He became Norton’s fifth president in 1994, and was appointed chairman in 2000.

== Notable editorial acquisitions ==
Originally the economics (Economics and Economics of the Public Sector by Joseph E. Stiglitz, Intermediate Microeconomics by Hal R. Varian, Macroeconomics by Robert E. Hall and John B. Taylor) and physics (Physics by Hans C. Ohanian) editor in Norton’s college department, he still acquires and edits books in the trade division for Norton. He is the editor of a cluster of books each by Nobel Prize–winning authors Joseph E. Stiglitz and Paul Krugman, as well as Fareed Zakaria, Seamus Heaney, Sean Wilentz, Steven Pinker, and Ben Bernanke, among others. In 2004 he acquired the publishing rights to The 9/11 Commission Report, which hit #1 on a number of online bestseller lists within hours of its release, as well as #1 on the New York Times bestseller list, going on to sell over a million copies as one of the bestselling government reports of all time.

== Affiliations ==
McFeely also serves on the boards of the Association of American Publishers, National Book Foundation, and Princeton University Press.

== Marriage ==
He is married to Karen McFeely (née Eliason).
