= Elbridge Van Syckel Besson =

American politician

14th & 16th Mayor of Hoboken
- In office April 1881 – April 1883
- Preceded by: John A. O'Neill
- Succeeded by: Herman L. Timken
- In office April 1878 – April 1880
- Preceded by: Joseph Russel
- Succeeded by: John A. O'Neill

Personal details
- Born: December 22, 1839 Galveston, Texas, U.S.
- Died: 1915 (aged 76) Hoboken, New Jersey, U.S.
- Party: Republican

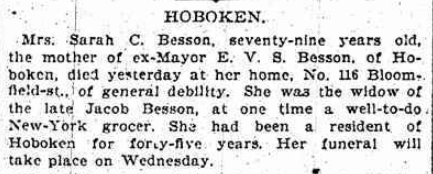
Sarah Carhart Runkle obituary. She was the mother of Elbridge Van Syckel Besson

Elbridge Van Syckel Besson (December 22, 1839 – 1915) was an American Republican Party politician who served two non-consecutive terms as the 14th and 16th Mayor of Hoboken, New Jersey. He also served a term in the New Jersey General Assembly.

== Biography ==
Besson was born on December 22, 1839, in Hoboken, New Jersey, to Jacob Besson and Sarah Carhart Runkle. He was President of the Hoboken City Council in 1865. He was a member of New Jersey General Assembly in 1869. Besson was the Republican nominee for mayor again in 1884 and 1895. He died in 1915 at the age of 76.
