= 2021 Jersey City mayoral election =

- November 2, 2021
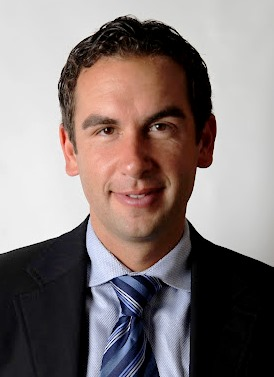
Candidate	Steve Fulop	Lewis Spears
Party	Democratic	Nonpartisan
Popular vote	28,562	13,741
Percentage	67.41%	32.43%
Mayor before election
Steve Fulop
Democratic
Elected mayor
Steve Fulop
Democratic

The Jersey City mayoral election of 2021 was held on November 2, 2021. Democrat Steve Fulop was re-elected to a third term with 67% of the vote.

== Results ==
Candidate	Vote Count	Percent
Steve Fulop	28,562	67.41%
Lewis Spears	13,741	32.43%
Personal Choice	70	0.16%
