= Brian Keller =

American baseball player (born 1994)

Free agent
- Pitcher
- Born: June 21, 1994 (age 32); Germantown, Wisconsin, U.S.
- Bats: Right Throws: Right

MLB debut
- July 25, 2026, for the Philadelphia Phillies

MLB statistics (through 2026 season)
- Win–loss record: 0-0
- Earned run average: 3.00
- Strikeouts: 3
- Stats at Baseball Reference

Teams
- Philadelphia Phillies (2026)

Brian Keller (born June 21, 1994) is an American professional baseball pitcher who is a free agent. He has previously played in Major League Baseball (MLB) for the Philadelphia Phillies. He made his MLB debut in 2026.

== Career ==
=== Amateur career ===
Keller attended Germantown High School in Germantown, Wisconsin, and the University of Wisconsin-Milwaukee. He played college baseball for the Milwaukee Panthers. He had two stints in the Northwoods League, appearing with the La Crosse Loggers in 2014 and with the Lakeshore Chinooks in 2015.

=== New York Yankees ===
The New York Yankees selected Keller in the 39th round (1,178th overall) of the 2016 Major League Baseball draft. He received a $2,000 signing bonus when he signed with the Yankees. While pitching for the Trenton Thunder of the Double–A Eastern League, Keller was named the league's pitcher of the week for July 23–29, 2018. On August 1, 2019, Keller threw a seven-inning no-hitter for Trenton.

=== Boston Red Sox ===
On December 8, 2021, the Boston Red Sox selected Keller from the Yankees in the minor league phase of the Rule 5 draft. He made 31 appearances (20 starts) for the Triple-A Worcester Red Sox in 2022, compiling a 6-5 record and 3.27 ERA with 126 strikeouts across 113 innings pitched. Keller elected free agency following the season on November 10, 2022.

=== Hanshin Tigers ===
On December 20, 2022, Keller signed with the Hanshin Tigers of Nippon Professional Baseball (NPB). He made only three appearances for the farm team in 2023 before returning to the U.S. to have his right elbow examined. On July 13, 2023, without having appeared for the main club, Keller and Hanshin officially parted ways. On August 14, Keller underwent Tommy John surgery, likely ruling him out for game action in 2024.

=== Philadelphia Phillies ===
On May 18, 2026, Keller signed a minor league contract with the Philadelphia Phillies organization. He pitched to a 2.23 ERA in eight games for the Triple–A Lehigh Valley IronPigs before the Phillies promoted him to the major leagues on July 25. Keller made his Major League debut later that night against the New York Yankees, allowing one run across three innings of work. The Phillies designated Keller for assignment on August 20. He cleared waivers and was sent outright to Triple–A Lehigh Valley the next day. He elected free agency on November 2.

== See also ==
- Rule 5 draft results
