= John Biddle (United States Army officer) =

United States Army general (1859–1936)

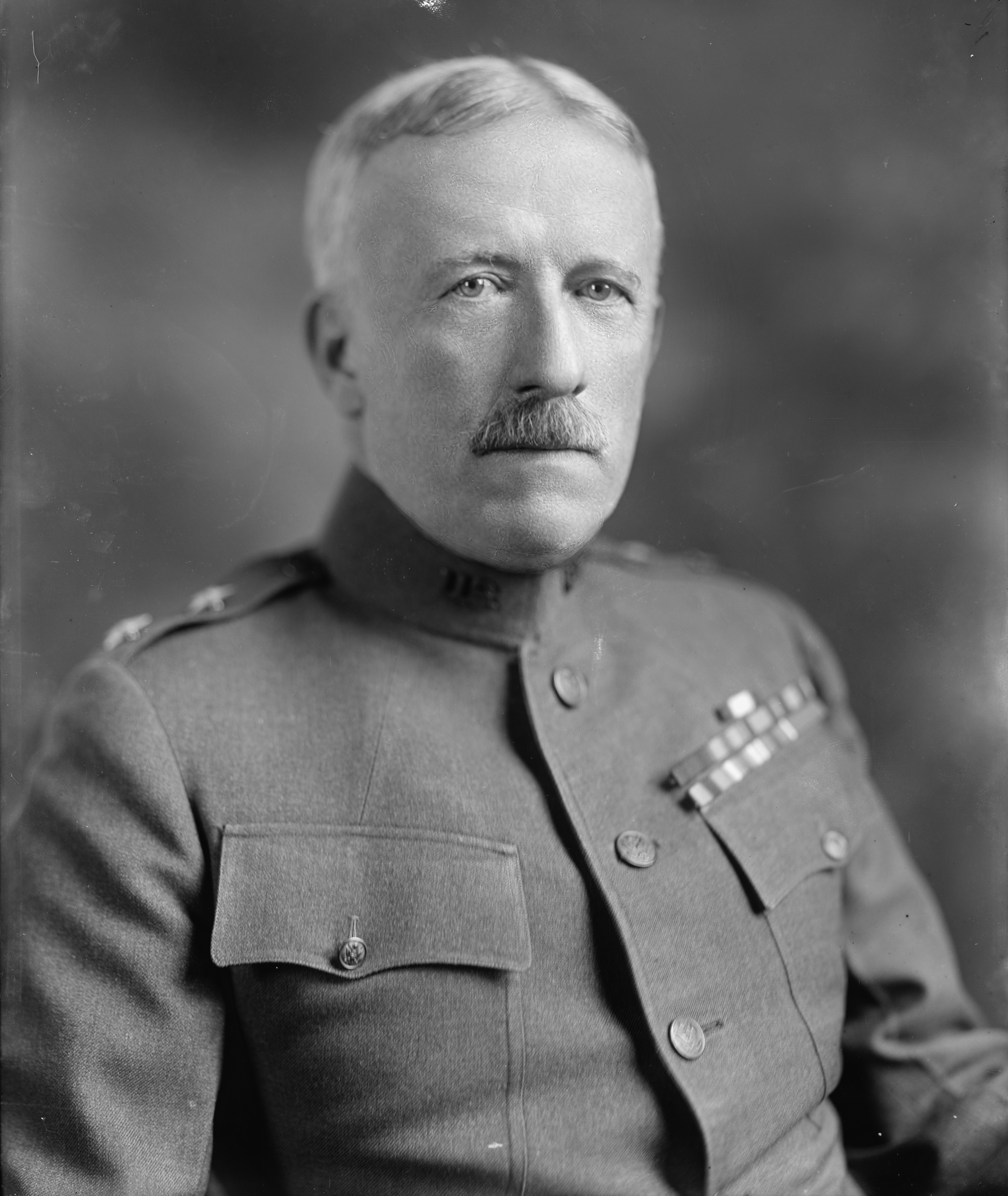
- Major General John Biddle during World War I
- Born: February 2, 1859; Detroit, Michigan, United States
- Died: January 18, 1936 (aged 76); San Antonio, Texas, United States
- Burial place: West Point Cemetery, West Point, New York, United States
- Education: University of Michigan
- Military career
- Allegiance: United States
- Branch: United States Army
- Service years: 1881–1920
- Rank: Major General
- Service number: 0-13130
- Unit: Corps of Engineers
- Commands: Superintendent of the United States Military Academy
- Conflicts: Spanish–American War; Philippine–American War; World War I
- Awards: Army Distinguished Service Medal; Silver Star

Engineer Commissioner of the District of Columbia
- In office November 1, 1901 – May 2, 1907
- Preceded by: Lansing Hoskins Beach
- Succeeded by: Jay J. Morrow

Major General John Biddle (February 2, 1859 – January 18, 1936) was a career United States Army officer who became superintendent of the United States Military Academy.

== Early life ==
Biddle was born in Detroit, Michigan. His father was William Shepard Biddle (1830–1902) and mother was Susan Dayton Ogden (1831–1878). His Biddle family included many political and military leaders, including grandfather John Biddle (1792–1859) and great-grandfather Charles Biddle (1745–1821). His maternal great-grandfather, Aaron Ogden, served as governor of New Jersey. His maternal grandfather, Elias B. D. Ogden, served as associate justice of the New Jersey Supreme Court.

His siblings were Dr. Andrew P. Biddle, First Lieutenant William S. Biddle Jr. and Eliza (Lily) Biddle, wife of Episcopal Bishop G. Mott Williams.

Biddle was raised outside the United States until he was a teenager, and he attended schools in Geneva and Heidelberg. He then attended the University of Michigan for a year, where he became a member of Delta Kappa Epsilon fraternity, but left to attend the United States Military Academy. He graduated in 1881, ranked second of 53. His high class ranking earned him a second lieutenant's commission in the first choice of most top graduates, the Corps of Engineers.

== Military career ==
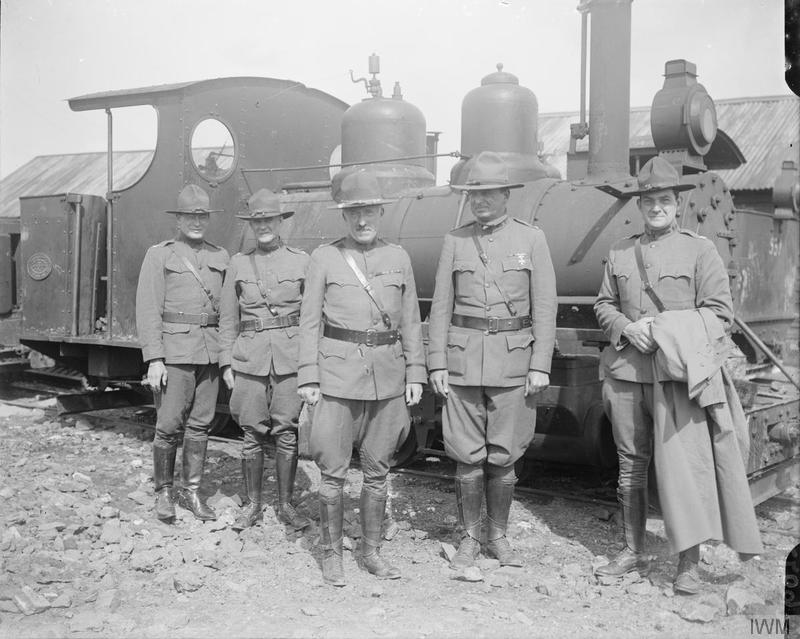
Brigadier General John Biddle and staff in charge of the railway regiments of the U.S. Army Corps of Engineers, at the light railway works at Boisleux-au-Mont, September 2, 1917

Biddle was commissioned an engineer. Biddle was in charge of river and harbor work at Nashville, Tennessee from 1891 to 1898. When the Spanish–American War broke out, he became Chief Engineer of Volunteers, serving in Puerto Rico, Cuba, and the Philippines. He was awarded the Silver Star. From 1901 to 1907 he was Engineer-Commissioner in charge of public works in Washington, D.C. Subsequently, he was in charge of river and harbor work in San Francisco from 1907 to 1911 and then served as an observer with the Austro-Hungarian Army on the Eastern Front from November 1914 to June 1915. He then was in charge of river and harbor improvements in Baltimore, Maryland. Biddle served as the superintendent of the US Military Academy at West Point from July 1916 to June 1917. When the United States entered World War I, he commanded a brigade of engineer regiments, then served as acting United States Army Chief of Staff in Washington while Chief of Staff Tasker Bliss was in London. In 1918 he was again sent overseas to take charge of American troops in Great Britain and Ireland.

== Death ==
Biddle died in San Antonio, Texas after a long illness. He was interred at the West Point Cemetery.

His nephew William Shepard Biddle III (1900–1981), rose to be major general after commanding the 113th Cavalry Regiment in World War II, and the 11th Constabulary Regiment in the German occupation.

== Awards and decorations ==
United Kingdom

- Royal Victorian Order (commander) (1919)
- Order of the Bath (knight commander) (1918)

United States

- Army Distinguished Service Medal
- Silver Star

The citation for his Army DSM reads:

The President of the United States of America, authorized by Act of Congress, July 9, 1918, takes pleasure in presenting the Army Distinguished Service Medal to Major General John Biddle, United States Army, for exceptionally meritorious and distinguished services to the Government of the United States, in a duty of great responsibility during World War I. In command of American troops in England, by his tact and diplomacy in handling intricate problems, General Biddle made possible the successful transshipment of many thousands of men to France. To his executive ability and efficient handling, control, and dispatch of casual troops through England is largely due.

== Bibliography ==
- Davis, Henry Blaine Jr. (1998). Generals in Khaki. Raleigh, NC: Pentland Press. pp. 34–35. ISBN 1-57197-088-6.

Military offices
Preceded by Clarence Page Townsley	Superintendents of the United States Military Academy; 1916–1917	Succeeded by Samuel Escue Tillman
