= Peter Cammarano =

American mayor (born 1977)

37th Mayor of Hoboken
- In office July 1, 2009 – July 31, 2009
- Preceded by: David Roberts
- Succeeded by: Dawn Zimmer

Personal details
- Born: July 22, 1977 (age 49) Wayne, New Jersey, U.S.
- Party: Democratic
- Education: Boston University; Seton Hall University School of Law

Peter J. Cammarano III (born July 22, 1977) is an American former Democratic politician, attorney, and convicted criminal. He was the 37th mayor of Hoboken, New Jersey, serving from July 1 until July 31, 2009. Cammarano was arrested by the FBI on corruption charges on July 23, 2009 as part of an international criminal investigation known as Operation Bid Rig; he resigned from office eight days later. He pleaded guilty to extortion in April 2010 and was later sentenced to 24 months in federal prison.

== Early life and education ==
Cammarano was born on July 22, 1977, in Wayne, New Jersey. He graduated from Boston University and Seton Hall University School of Law.

== Career ==
In 2001, Cammarano moved to Hoboken, New Jersey. He served as the Hoboken coordinator of the 2004 John Kerry presidential campaign and as the New Jersey legal director for U.S. Senator Bob Menendez's 2006 campaign.

A Democrat, Cammarano was elected Councilman-at-Large in Hoboken in a 2005 run-off election. At the time, he was an associate attorney at Genova, Burns & Vernoia, an election law firm.

On June 9, 2009, Cammarano won the Hoboken mayor's race in a runoff election, defeating Dawn Zimmer by 161 votes. Absentee and provisional ballots carried him to victory. Zimmer's three running mates won control of the City Council despite Cammarano's mayoral win. Cammarano was sworn into office on July 1, 2009. At age 32, he became the youngest mayor in city history.

Cammarano announced his resignation from office on July 31, 2009 following his arrest on corruption charges. In his resignation letter, Cammarano said, "I apologize to the residents of Hoboken for the disruption and disappointment this case has caused". He was succeeded by Zimmer, who had been elected City Council president and as such was next in line as acting mayor until elections could be held.

== Criminal activity ==
On July 23, 2009, just 22 days after assuming office as mayor of Hoboken, Cammarano was arrested by the FBI as part of a major political corruption and international money laundering conspiracy probe known as Operation Bid Rig. Cammarano was charged by the U.S. Attorney's Office for the District of New Jersey with accepting $25,000 in cash bribes from an undercover cooperating witness.

Cammarano pleaded guilty on April 20, 2010, to extorting cash contributions in return for official influence and admitted accepting $25,000 in illicit cash contributions in exchange for exercising his future official influence and authority. Cammarano remained free on a $100,000 bond pending his sentence. The guilty plea effectively ended his political career; New Jersey, like most states, does not allow convicted felons to hold office.

On August 5, 2010, Cammarano was sentenced to 24 months in federal prison. He was released from prison on Wednesday September 14, 2011, and sent to a halfway house in New York.

After his conviction, the New Jersey Supreme Court disciplinary review board suspended Cammarano's law license for three years. This decision was appealed to the Supreme Court, which disbarred him in September 2014.

In July 2025, Cammarano had his New York law license reinstated after a panel of judges found he had genuine remorse for his conduct.
