= Mayor of Hoboken, New Jersey =

Head of Hoboken, New Jersey

Mayor of the City of Hoboken
- Incumbent; Emily Jabbour since January 15, 2026
- Term length: Four years
- Inaugural holder: Cornelius V. Clickener
- Formation: 1855
- Salary: $116,000

The Mayor of the City of Hoboken is the head of the executive branch of government of Hoboken, New Jersey, United States. The mayor has the duty to enforce the municipal charter and ordinances; prepare the annual budget; appoint deputy mayors, department heads, and aides; and approve or veto ordinances passed by the City Council. The mayor is popularly elected in a nonpartisan general election. The office is held for a four-year term without term limits.

Forty individuals have held the office of mayor since the City of Hoboken was chartered on March 29, 1855. Cornelius V. Clickener was the inaugural mayor of the city, and served two consecutive terms. The current mayor is Emily Jabbour, who began serving on January 15th, 2026.

== Duties and powers ==
The City of Hoboken is organized as a mayor-council form of government under the Optional Municipal Charter Law. This provides for a citywide elected mayor serving in an executive role, as well as a city council serving in a legislative role. All of these offices are selected in a nonpartisan municipal election and all terms are four years. Under state law, the mayor has the duty to enforce the charter and ordinances of the city, and all applicable state laws; report annually to the council and the public on the state of the city; supervise and control all departments of the government; prepare and submit to the council annual operating and capital budgets; supervise all city property, institutions and agencies; sign all contracts and bonds requiring the approval of the city; negotiate all contracts; and serve as a member, either voting or ex officio, of all appointive bodies.

The mayor has the power to appoint departments heads with the approval of the City Council; to remove department heads subject to a two-thirds disapproval by the City Council; approve or veto ordinances subject to an override vote of two-thirds of the council; and appoint deputy mayors. The mayor is permitted to attend and participate in meetings of the City Council, without a vote, except in the case of a tie on the question to fill a council vacancy.

== Succession ==
In the event of an absence, disability, or other cause preventing the mayor from performing his duties, the mayor may designate the business administrator or any other department head as acting mayor for up to 60 days. In the event of a vacancy in the office, the President of the City Council becomes acting mayor, and the council has 30 days to name an interim mayor. If no interim mayor is named, the Council President continues as acting mayor until a successor is elected, or until the council reorganizes and selects a new president. Prior to 1971, there was no automatic succession law.

== Mayors ==
No.	Mayor	Took office	Left office	Tenure	Party	Election
1	Cornelius V. Clickener (1819–1864)	1855	1857	2 years	Democratic	1855
2	Franklin B. Carpenter (1818–1863); 1st time	April 1857	April 1858	1 year	Republican	TBA
3	George W. Morton (1793–1865)	April 1858	April 1859	1 year	Democratic	TBA
4	Franklin B. Carpenter (1818–1863); 2nd time	April 1859	April 1860	1 year	Republican	TBA
5	John R. Johnston (?–1863)	April 1860	April 18, 1863 (Note: Died in office.)	3 years	Unknown	TBA
6	Lorenzo W. Elder (1820–1892)	April 1863	April 1864	1 year	Democratic	TBA
7	Charles T. Perry (1812–1872)	April 1864	April 1865	1 year	Democratic	TBA
8	Frederick B. Ogden (1827–1893)	April 1865	April 1867	2 years	Democratic	TBA
9	Frederick W. Bohnstedt (c. 1825–c. 1883)	April 1867	April 1869	2 years	Democratic	TBA
10	Hazen Kimball (1835–1890)	April 1869	April 1871	2 years	Unknown	TBA
11	Frederick L. Schmersahl (1825–1905)	April 1871	April 1873	2 years	Republican (Note: Schmersahl was rejected by the Hoboken Democratic Convention as their candidate for mayor in the 1871 election and was reported to run independently, but was elected as a Republican. In the 1872 election, Schmersahl was nominated by both the Democratic and Republican parties.)	1871
11	Frederick L. Schmersahl (1825–1905)	April 1871	April 1873	2 years	Republican	1872
12	Peter McGavisk (TBA–TBA)	April 1873	April 1875	2 years	Democratic	TBA
13	Joseph Russel (TBA–TBA)	April 1875	April 1878	3 years	Unknown	TBA
14	Elbridge Van Syckel Besson (1839–1915); 1st time	April 1878	April 1880	2 years	Republican	TBA
15	John A. O'Neill (c. 1837–1892)	April 1880	April 1881	1 year	Democratic	TBA
16	Elbridge Van Syckel Besson (1839–1915); 2nd time	April 1881	April 1883	2 years	Republican	TBA
17	Herman L. Timken (TBA–TBA)	April 1883	April 1886	3 years	Unknown	TBA
18	Edwin J. Kerr (1839–1917)	April 1886	April 1888	2 years	Unknown	TBA
19	August Grassman (TBA–TBA)	April 1888	April 1891	3 years	Unknown	TBA
20	Edward R. Stanton (TBA–TBA)	April 1891	April 1892	1 year	Democratic	TBA
21	William Ellis (TBA–TBA)	April 1892	April 1893	1 year	Unknown	TBA
22	Lawrence Fagan (1851–1921)	April 1893	April 1901	8 years	Democratic	TBA
23	Adolph Lankering (1851–1937)	1901	1906	5 years	Unknown	TBA
24	George Henry Steil Sr. (1861–1926)	1906	1910	4 years	Democratic	TBA
25	George Washington Gonzales (?–1946)	1910	1912	2 years	Republican	TBA
26	Martin Cooke (1872–1944)	1912	1915	3 years	Unknown	TBA
27	Patrick R. Griffin (c. 1878–1931)	1915	1926	11 years	Democratic	TBA
28	Gustav Bach (TBA–TBA)	1926	1929	3 years	Democratic	TBA
29	Bernard N. McFeely (1882–1949)	1930	1947	17 years	Democratic	TBA
30	Fred M. DeSapio (TBA–TBA)	1947	1953	6 years	Democratic	TBA
31	John J. Grogan (1914–1968)	1953	1965	12 years	Democratic	TBA
32	Louis Depascale (TBA–TBA); 1st time	1965	1965	<1 year	Unknown	TBA
33	Silvio Failla (1910–1972)	1965	1965	<1 year	Democratic	TBA
34	Louis Depascale (TBA–TBA); 2nd time	1965	1973	8 years	Unknown	TBA
35	Steve Cappiello (1923–2013)	July 1973	June 1985	12 years	Democratic	TBA
36	Thomas Vezzetti (1928–1988)	July 1, 1985	March 2, 1988	2 years, 245 days	Democratic	TBA
–	Patrick Pasculli (1947–2026); Acting, then elected	1988	1989	1 year	Democratic	City council president acting as mayor
37	Patrick Pasculli (1947–2026); Acting, then elected	1989	1993	4 years	Democratic	1989
38	Anthony Russo (1946–2021)	1993	2001	8 years	Unknown	1993
38	Anthony Russo (1946–2021)	1993	2001	8 years	Unknown	1997
39	David Roberts (born 1956)	July 1, 2001	2009	8 years	Democratic	2001
39	David Roberts (born 1956)	July 1, 2001	2009	8 years	Democratic	2005
40	Peter Cammarano (born 1977)	July 1, 2009	July 31, 2009 (Note: Cammarano was arrested during Operation Bid Rig and resigned from office.)	30 days	Democratic	2009
–	Dawn Zimmer (born 1968); Acting, then elected	July 31, 2009	November 6, 2009	98 days	Democratic	City council president acting as mayor
41	Dawn Zimmer (born 1968); Acting, then elected	November 6, 2009	January 1, 2018	8 years, 56 days	Democratic	2009 special
41	Dawn Zimmer (born 1968); Acting, then elected	November 6, 2009	January 1, 2018	8 years, 56 days	Democratic	2013
42	Ravinder Bhalla (born 1973)	January 1, 2018	January 13, 2026	8 years, 12 days	Democratic	2017
42	Ravinder Bhalla (born 1973)	January 1, 2018	January 13, 2026	8 years, 12 days	Democratic	2021
43	Emily Jabbour (born c. 1980)	January 15, 2026	Incumbent	297 days	Democratic	2025
