= Dawn Zimmer =

Politician; former Mayor of Hoboken, New Jersey (born 1968)

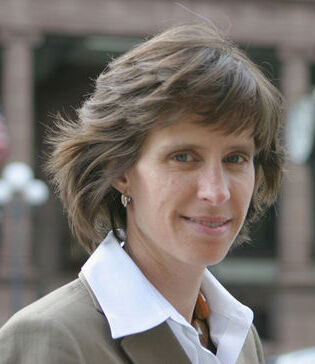

38th Mayor of Hoboken
- In office July 31, 2009 – January 1, 2018 (Acting: July 31, 2009 – November 6, 2009)
- Preceded by: Peter Cammarano
- Succeeded by: Ravinder Bhalla

Personal details
- Born: April 16, 1968 (age 58) Towson, Maryland, U.S.
- Party: Democratic
- Spouse: Stan Grossbard
- Children: 2
- Education: University of New Hampshire (B.A.)

Dawn Zimmer (born April 16, 1968) is an American politician who served as the 38th mayor of Hoboken, New Jersey. As president of the Hoboken City Council, she became acting mayor after incumbent Peter Cammarano's resignation on July 31, 2009 following his arrest on corruption charges. Zimmer is the first female mayor of Hoboken. She was first elected mayor in a special election for the balance of Cammarano's term on November 6, 2009 and was re-elected mayor for another four-year term in November 2013. In 2012, 2013 and 2014, she was ranked #3, #4 and #5, respectively, on The Hudson Reporter's list of the 50 most influential people in Hudson County.

== Early life ==
Dawn Zimmer was born in Towson, Maryland, and raised in Laconia, New Hampshire. She is of German and Irish descent. She attended public schools and graduated cum laude in 1990 from the University of New Hampshire with a degree in history.

== Early career ==
Zimmer taught English at a private language school in Japan from 1990 to 1993. She worked at Sumitomo Corporation of America doing internal and external communications for four years and in public relations specializing in crisis communications at Edelman Worldwide for three years. She has also worked as a family portrait photographer and as marketing director for her husband's jewelry business. She and her family moved to Hoboken from New York City in September 2002.

== Political career ==
=== Early civic work ===
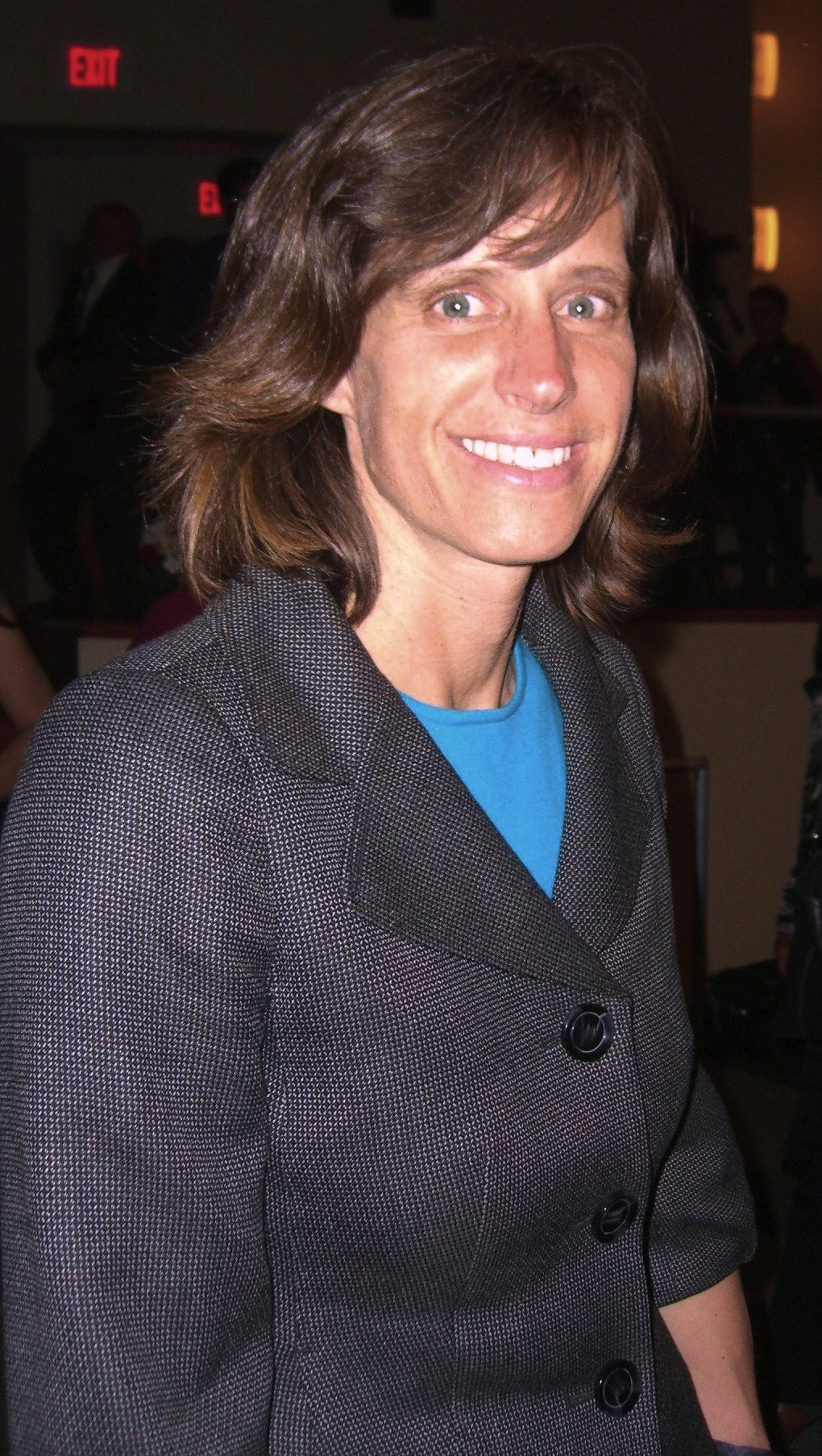
Zimmer at the swearing-in ceremony of Union City Mayor Brian P. Stack, May 18, 2010

Zimmer became involved in civic life in Hoboken in 2006 when she joined the Southwest Parks Coalition Steering Committee to advocate for more park space in southwest Hoboken's 4th Ward. She also served as a board member of the Kaplan Cooperative Preschool and as secretary of the Parent Teacher Student Organization for the Elysian Charter School. In 2007, she ran for Hoboken City Council in the 4th Ward against incumbent Christopher Campos. In the first election in May, neither candidate reached 50 percent, necessitating a runoff election. Zimmer outpolled Campos in the June runoff by eight votes, but Campos challenged the results, charging that absentee ballots were improperly handled. Zimmer in turn charged that Campos had received votes from non-residents. A second runoff was called in November, with Zimmer defeating Campos by a margin of 1,070 votes to 956.

In October 2007, Zimmer, as Hoboken's 4th Ward Councilwoman, supported a voter referendum to create an Open Space Trust Fund. Originally this fund could have been used to pay maintenance on existing parks but Councilwoman Zimmer and other Councilpeople voted to ensure that it would only be used for the acquisition of new space and the maintenance of new space.

=== Hoboken Mayor ===
Zimmer ran for Mayor of Hoboken in 2009. She lost to Peter Cammarano in the June runoff by 161 votes. On July 1, when Cammarano was sworn in as mayor, the City Council unanimously elected Zimmer as Council President.

On July 23, 2009, Cammarano was arrested by the FBI as part of a major corruption and international money laundering conspiracy probe known as Operation Bid Rig. Cammarano was charged with accepting $25,000 in cash bribes from an undercover cooperating witness. The same witness approached Zimmer's campaign staff and was unsuccessful in setting up a meeting. She joined other local officials in calling for Cammarano's resignation.

On July 31, 2009, Cammarano resigned from office, and Zimmer was immediately sworn in as acting mayor. On November 3, 2009, she won a special election to fill the rest of Cammarano's mayoral term. In the special election, Zimmer faced six opponents: City Councilwoman Beth Mason, businessman Frank Raia, former Hoboken Municipal Court judge Kimberly Glatt, Hoboken Republican Club co-founder Nathan Brinkman, management consultant Everton A. Wilson, and former corrections officer Patricia Waiters. She finished with 43% of the vote, with Mason in second place with 23% and Raia in third place with 18%. As it was a special election, no runoff was required. Zimmer was sworn in as mayor on November 6, 2009, giving up her City Council seat. In 2008, Hoboken City had come under State Supervision due to an 11.7 million dollar budget deficit. By the end of her first term, Hoboken had a balanced budget, had cut taxes by 12%, and the city's bond rating had gone from BBB− to AA+, the second highest S&P rating. Zimmer was re-elected as mayor along with her entire ticket in November 2013.

Zimmer played a significant role in privatizing Hoboken University Hospital (formerly St. Mary Hospital), and keeping it from closing in 2011. The hospital—New Jersey's oldest—faced closure due to severe financial problems. The City of Hoboken had guaranteed $52 million of the hospital's debt, so its failure would have had been financially devastating for the city.

On June 20, 2017, Zimmer announced that she would not seek re-election in the November 2017 municipal election. She explained that she had become increasingly concerned about global warming: "With President Trump having pulled our country out of the Paris Accord, demonstrating a lack of commitment to addressing this critical issue at the federal level, I've decided that it is the right time for me to take a new role working more directly on this important issue."

==== Aftermath of Hurricane Sandy ====
In 2012 Zimmer was widely acclaimed for leadership during the aftermath Hurricane Sandy. On September 9, 2013, she was recognized as "Hero of the Harbor" by the Waterfront Alliance for her work "to make her city a national model for preparedness, meeting with FEMA and state officials, urban planners, scientists and many others to create an 'integrated solution.'" For her leadership during Hurricane Sandy, Zimmer was appointed to the President's Hurricane Sandy Rebuilding Task Force.

In November 2013, President Obama named Zimmer to the Presidential Task Force on Climate Preparedness and Resilience.

In December 2013, Zimmer testified before the U.S. Senate Committee on Small Business & Entrepreneurship on Thursday, December. She discussed the impact Hurricane Sandy has had on Hoboken and the challenges still faced with the recovery process. She met with Members of Congress to highlight the unmet needs of businesses and residents.

She was invited to Geneva, Switzerland to present at UN Global Platform for Disaster Risk Reduction Conference.

==== Same-sex marriage ====
Zimmer has been a strong proponent of same-sex marriage and publicly urged Governor Christie to change his position in opposition. On October 27, 2013 Zimmer performed the first same-sex marriage in Hoboken.

==== Relationship with Governor Christie ====
In May 2010 Zimmer invited Governor Christie to speak in Hoboken in his first of a series of town hall meetings throughout the state supporting the 2% tax levy cap. She supported the property tax cap as the part of a package of legislation that includes changes to the arbitration process, shared services and the disciplinary process. "There is nothing partisan about being smart and responsible with money entrusted [to us] by our citizens", Zimmer said. That September Christie was invited back to the city to speak at Elysian Charter School about his education reform agenda and the role of charter schools. Zimmer, whose two children attend Elysian Charter School, echoed concerns on the feasibility of funding charter schools, in light of the lack of state aid for facility-related expenses.

On August 20, 2013 The Star-Ledger reporter Jenna Portnoy posted on Twitter that Zimmer had stated she would not endorse either major candidate in that November's race pitting Republican Christie against Democratic State Senator Barbara Buono.

==== Allegations against Christie administration officials ====
On January 18, 2014, Zimmer appeared on Up with Steve Kornacki, and said that Lieutenant Governor Kim Guadagno and Commissioner of the New Jersey Department of Community Affairs Rich Constable had pressured her to support a Rockefeller Group development project in Hoboken in exchange for the city receiving additional federal Sandy relief aid. On January 20 she went on a CNN program and stated that a month earlier, Marc Ferzan, Director of the Governor's Office of Recovery and Rebuilding had also pressured her to support more development in exchange for federal Sandy recovery funds. Following her television appearances, the Federal Bureau of Investigation and United States Attorney for the District of New Jersey met with Zimmer. They also interviewed two of her aides and five other potential witnesses. Zimmer stated: "As their investigation proceeds, they have asked me to refrain from giving any additional interviews and I am respecting their request." The Christie administration officials categorically denied the allegations, a spokesman saying "It is very clear partisan politics are at play here as Democratic mayors with a political axe to grind come out of the woodwork and try to get their faces on television." Zimmer said she had not come forward until after the so-called Bridgegate scandal (which had become public knowledge 10 days earlier) because she thought her claims would be not taken seriously. On January 31, the city acknowledged that it had received subpoenas from the U.S. Attorney. In April 2014 the Hoboken City Council adopted a resolution which allowed the attorney handling the matter to waive attorney–client privilege, enabling him to speak to the U.S. Attorney.

An internal investigative was commissioned by the Christie administration and conducted by Randy Mastro of law firm Gibson, Dunn and Crutcher. Zimmer declined to participate. A report released in March 2014 said that Zimmer's allegations were, "in material respects, demonstrably false." and "whether intentional or not, it appears that Mayor Zimmer's subjective perception of events she has described do not reflect objective reality." Zimmer dismissed the report as "sadly predictable" and said she was still willing to repeat her allegations under oath, stating, "Randy Mastro could have written his report the day he was hired and saved the taxpayers the million dollars in fees." In editorials, The Star-Ledger and The New York Times labeled the report a "whitewash" as did 56% of New Jersey voters in an April 2014 survey by the Quinnipiac University Polling Institute. After a 16-month investigation, the United States Attorney for the District of New Jersey concluded that Zimmer's claims were unfounded. In letters dated May 1, 2015 to Guadagno, Constable and Ferzan the U.S. Attorney wrote: "Based on the evidence developed during the investigation and our review of applicable law, we have concluded that no further action is warranted in this matter. Accordingly, the investigation of these allegations have been closed."

==== Influence ====
In 2012 the Hudson Reporter named Zimmer as #3 in its list of Hudson County's 50 most influential people entities, behind North Bergen mayor Nicholas Sacco and Union City mayor Brian P. Stack. She was ranked #4 in 2013, and #5 in 2014. In 2015, various news articles pointed to documents showing a partnership with her spouse as an influential figure in her administration and Hoboken City government affairs. This prompted several residents to voice concerns at a subsequent City Council meeting, who were forcefully ejected by Hoboken Council president Bhalla.

== Personal life ==
Zimmer is married to Stan Grossbard, who is President of the RCDC Corporation, a diamond manufacturing and wholesaling company that markets the Original Radiant Cut Diamond, which was invented in 1977 by his father, Henry Grossbard. Zimmer converted from Unitarianism to Judaism. Stan Grossbard and Dawn Zimmer have two children together.
