= Anthony Louis Scarmolin =

American composer (1890–1969)

- Born: July 30, 1890; Schio, Veneto, Italy
- Died: July 13, 1969 (aged 78); Wyckoff, New Jersey

Anthony Louis Scarmolin (July 30, 1890 – July 13, 1969) was an Italian-born American composer, pianist, and conductor.

== Biography ==
Anthony Louis Scarmolin was born in Schio, Veneto, Italy on July 30, 1890. He was brought to the United States as a boy. His father worked in the textile industry, and was an amateur musician who gave Anthony his first music lessons. He trained as a musician at the New York German Conservatory of Music where he graduated with a diploma in 1907.

Scarmolin initially pursued a career as a concert pianist, but a debilitating hand condition caused him to abandon this aspiration in 1909. From this point forward his career shifted to music composition. However, he did continue to perform as a pianist in the years before World War I with the Aurora Band; an music organization made up entirely of Italian immigrants, including violinist Alfredo Lora (brother of Arthur Lora), that was led by Silva Meneguzzo. He became a naturalized citizen of the United States in 1911.

During World War I, Scarmolin served in the United States Army, and after the war became a resident of first Philadelphia, Pennsylvania for a brief period, and then Union City, New Jersey. He served as supervisor of the instrumental music program at Emerson High School in the Union City School District (UCSD) from 1919 to 1949 during which time he was also active as a composer, conductor and pianist elsewhere. In 1926 he married the singer and voice teacher Aida Balasso.

Scarmolin composed approximately 1,100 music compositions during his lifetime. These included seven operas, more than 150 works for orchestra, more than 200 works for chorus, more than 100 art songs, approximately 550 works for keyboard, and more than 70 chamber music compositions. After his retirement from UCSD in 1949, he continued to compose until his death.

Scarmolin died in Wyckoff, New Jersey on July 13, 1969. The A. Louis Scarmolin Trust, a non-profit organization, was founded to promote his music. The organization's advocacy has led to recordings and performances by ensembles internationally.

== Partial list of compositions ==
=== Orchestral ===
- Di notte (1909)
- Night (1937)
- Overture on a Street Vendor’s Ditty (1938)
- Symphony No. 1 (1937)
- Minature Symphony (1940)

=== Operas ===
- Tamara (1913, libretto by A. Rubega)
- The Interrupted Serenade (1913, libretto by A. Rubega)
- The Oath (1919, libretto by A. Rubega)
- La grotta rosa (1921, libretto by A. Rubega)
- Passan le maschere (1922, libretto by A. Rubega)
- The Caliph (1948, libretto by C. S. Montanye)
- The Devil’s Dance (1958, libretto by A. Rubega and A. Louis Scarmolin)
