= Union City High School (New Jersey) =

High School in Hudson County, New Jersey, US

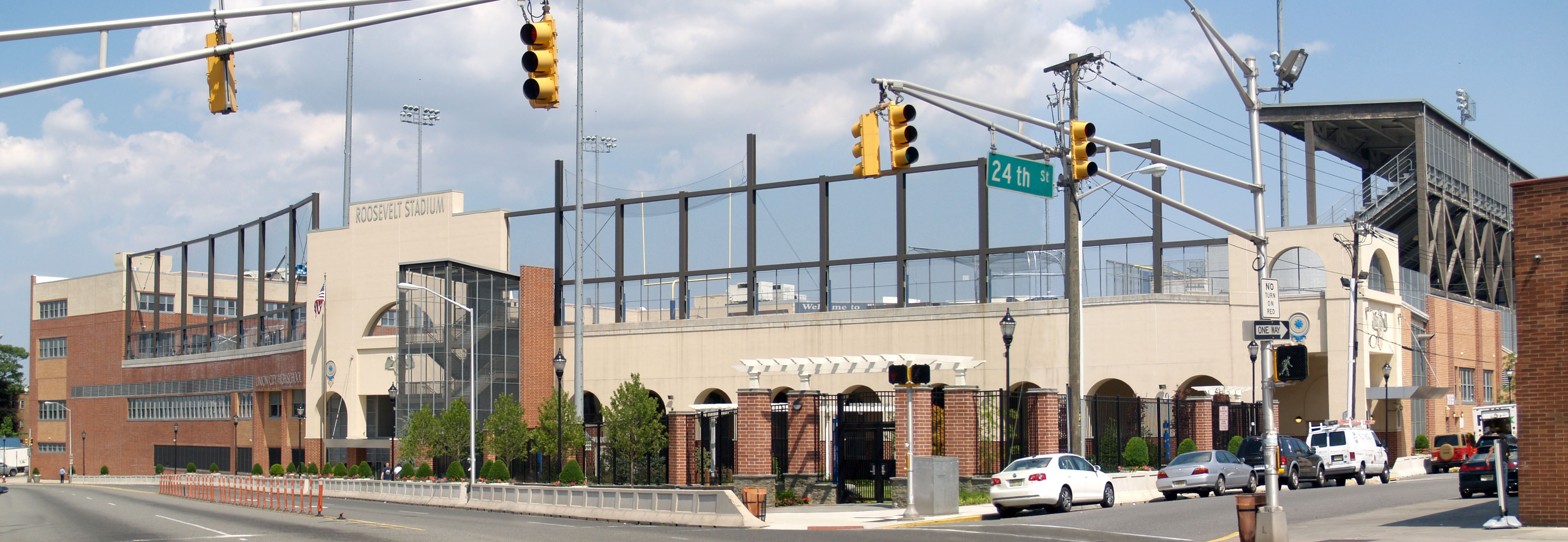

Location
- 2500 Kennedy Boulevard; Union City, Hudson County, New Jersey 07087; United States; 40.7703°N 74.0363°W

Information
- Type: Public high school
- Established: September 2008; 18 years ago
- School district: Union City School District
- NCES School ID: 341638003059
- Principal: Ryan Lewis
- Faculty: 181.0 FTEs
- Grades: 9-12
- Enrollment: 3,089 (as of 2023–24)
- Student to teacher ratio: 17.1:1
- Colors: Navy blue silver and white
- Athletics conference: Hudson County Interscholastic League (general); North Jersey Super Football Conference (football)
- Team name: Soaring Eagles
- Rival: North Bergen High School
- Accreditation: Middle States Association of Colleges and Schools
- Newspaper: The Egalitarian
- Website: uchs.ucboe.us

Union City High School is a four-year comprehensive public high school serving students in ninth through twelfth grades from Union City, in Hudson County, in the U.S. state of New Jersey, operating as part of the Union City Board of Education. The four-story school is located between Kennedy Boulevard and Summit Avenue, from 24th to 26th Street, with additional facilities a block south on Kerrigan Avenue. The school has been accredited by the Middle States Association of Colleges and Schools Commission on Elementary and Secondary Schools through July 2030.

As of the 2023–24 school year, the school had an enrollment of 3,089 students and 181.0 classroom teachers (on an FTE basis), for a student–teacher ratio of 17.1:1. There were 2,010 students (65.1% of enrollment) eligible for free lunch and 356 (11.5% of students) eligible for reduced-cost lunch. Based on 2021-22 data from the New Jersey Department of Education, it was the second-largest high school in the state (behind Passaic County Technical Institute) and one of 29 schools with more than 2,000 students.

The school administratively formed in 2008, with athletic teams combined, but for the first year the students were still at their former buildings. Its current building opened in September 2009, at that time merging the student bodies of the city's prior two high schools, Union Hill High School and Emerson High School, and marking the first high school opened in the city in 90 years. The school, which was built on the site of the former Roosevelt Stadium, cost $180 million, covers 4.5 acres (1.8 ha) and includes a rooftop football field. The school's colors are navy blue and silver.

== Grade structure ==
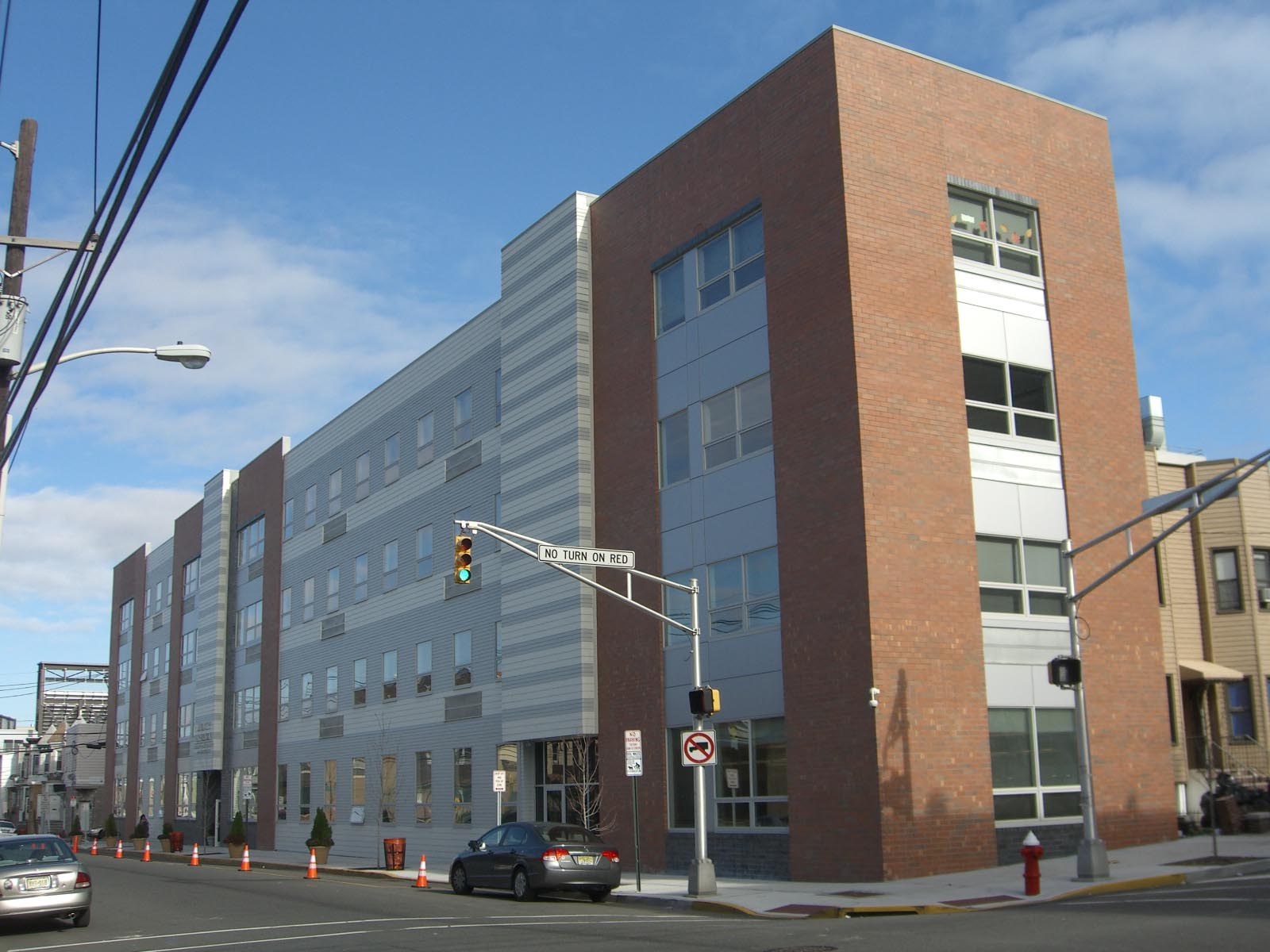
The Academy for Enrichment and Advancement

Union City High School holds Freshman through Senior students. The Academy for Enrichment and Advancement (AEA), which is housed one block south on Kerrigan Avenue between 22nd and 23rd Streets, is a special interest academy that is part of the high school. The AEA provides classes for students of grades 9 - 12 who show interest in the fields of science and engineering, and served as an alternative to José Martí Freshman Academy, which most ninth graders attended at the time.

Since its inaugural school year, Union City High School has offered college-level courses to students, and through its partnerships with nearby colleges and universities, increased the number of such courses for the 2010–2011 school year, enabling students to accumulate up to 12 - 15 college credits by graduation that can be transferred to New Jersey public colleges. In addition to Liberal Arts courses, students can take advanced placement biology, chemistry, physics, anatomy & physiology, forensic science, robotics, geometry, algebra 2, and calculus at the AEA. Students preparing for civil engineering and architecture careers can take pre-engineering, computer networking and computer aided design (CAD) at the AEA. The AEA offers a course in Mandarin Chinese added in 2016, making it one of the few high schools in New Jersey to do so. As of 2021, the Advanced Placement participation rate in the school was 13%. The Academy was so successful that the student body outgrew the building. To meet their needs, the city converted José Martí Freshman Academy into José Martí STEM Academy, beginning with the September 2019 semester, which saw 700 students in grades 9-12 enter the school the first time. So great was demand that 500 students applied for the 130 spaces available for the following year's freshman class.

== History ==
The site on which Union City High School sits was acquired by the city in the 1930s, having originally been the location of the Hudson County Consumers Brewery Company, which opened in 1901 and closed in 1928. Through the efforts of Director of Public Affairs Harry J. Thorout and the Federal Works Progress Administration, which awarded the project $172,472, as part of Franklin D. Roosevelt's New Deal, it was turned into the art deco Roosevelt Stadium, which opened in 1937. Though primarily a football stadium that served as a home to future National Football League greats Lou Cordileone and Frank Winters and College Football Hall of Famer Ed Franco, the stadium also housed events in semi-pro baseball, soccer, track, boxing, as well as numerous special events, such as an exhibition baseball game featuring Babe Ruth and Lou Gehrig. Roosevelt Stadium was also the home to the annual Thanksgiving Turkey Game between rivals Emerson High School and Union Hill High School, the two high schools that previously served the city. The last Turkey Game was hosted by the stadium in 2004. Three subsequent Turkey Games were held at the Midtown Athletic Complex until 2007, after which the two high schools would be converted into middle schools. José Martí Middle School, which is located on Summit Avenue at 18th Street, was converted into José Martí Freshman Academy.

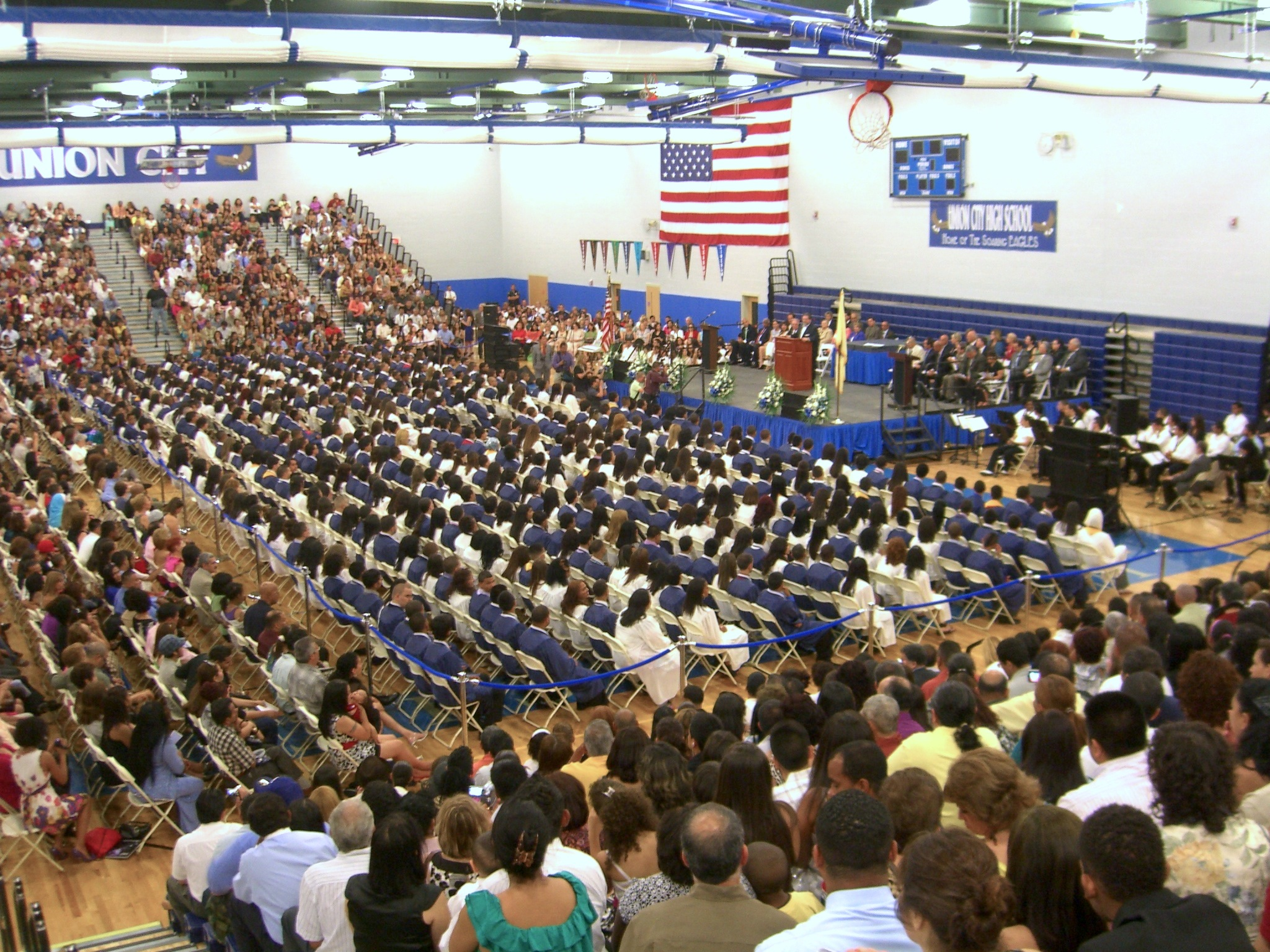
Commencement ceremony for the school's first graduating class, June 23, 2010. At the podium is New Jersey Supreme Court Justice Roberto A. Rivera-Soto, giving the keynote speech.

On July 11, 2005, acting New Jersey Governor Richard Codey and Union City Mayor Brian P. Stack, along with other officials, broke ground in preparation for the new complex, budgeted at $180 million, of which $172 million was provided by the state, with Union City providing the remaining $8 million, making it one of the most expensive schools in New Jersey. Cliffside Park-based RSC Architects, in partnership with architecture firm HOK New York, designed the 360,000-square-foot (33,000 m^{2}) school, which includes 66 classrooms. Piscataway-based Epic Management served as the construction manager for the project. In early March 2006, a large piece of the Hudson Brewery's original brick foundation was found intact, along with the base of a manhole still connected to an original sewer that opened underneath the brewery. The artifacts were removed for historic preservation.

The merger of the two high schools into Union City High took place in July 2008, but due to a delay in the building process, for the subsequent school year classes remained at the predecessor school buildings, now Union City South (Emerson) and Union City North (Union Hill); students retained the same teachers at their respective campuses. The athletic teams however combined in 2008. The Union City High School building opened for students on September 3, 2009, marking the first high school built in Union City in 90 years. The school's inaugural principal was David Wilcomes. A ribbon-cutting ceremony was held on September 25, and attended by Union City Mayor Brian P. Stack, New Jersey Governor Jon Corzine and Senator Bob Menendez. A subsequent opening gala was held September 26, and featured appearances from celebrities such as Harry Carson of the New York Giants and actor and Union Hill High School graduate Bobby Cannavale, and a performance by musician Tito Puente Jr. A performance by Cuban singer Cucu Diamantes was cancelled by the city's Board of Education, causing controversy. The Board cancelled the performance in response to threats of protest by anti-Castro activists over Diamantes' performance in a concert in Havana, Cuba days earlier.

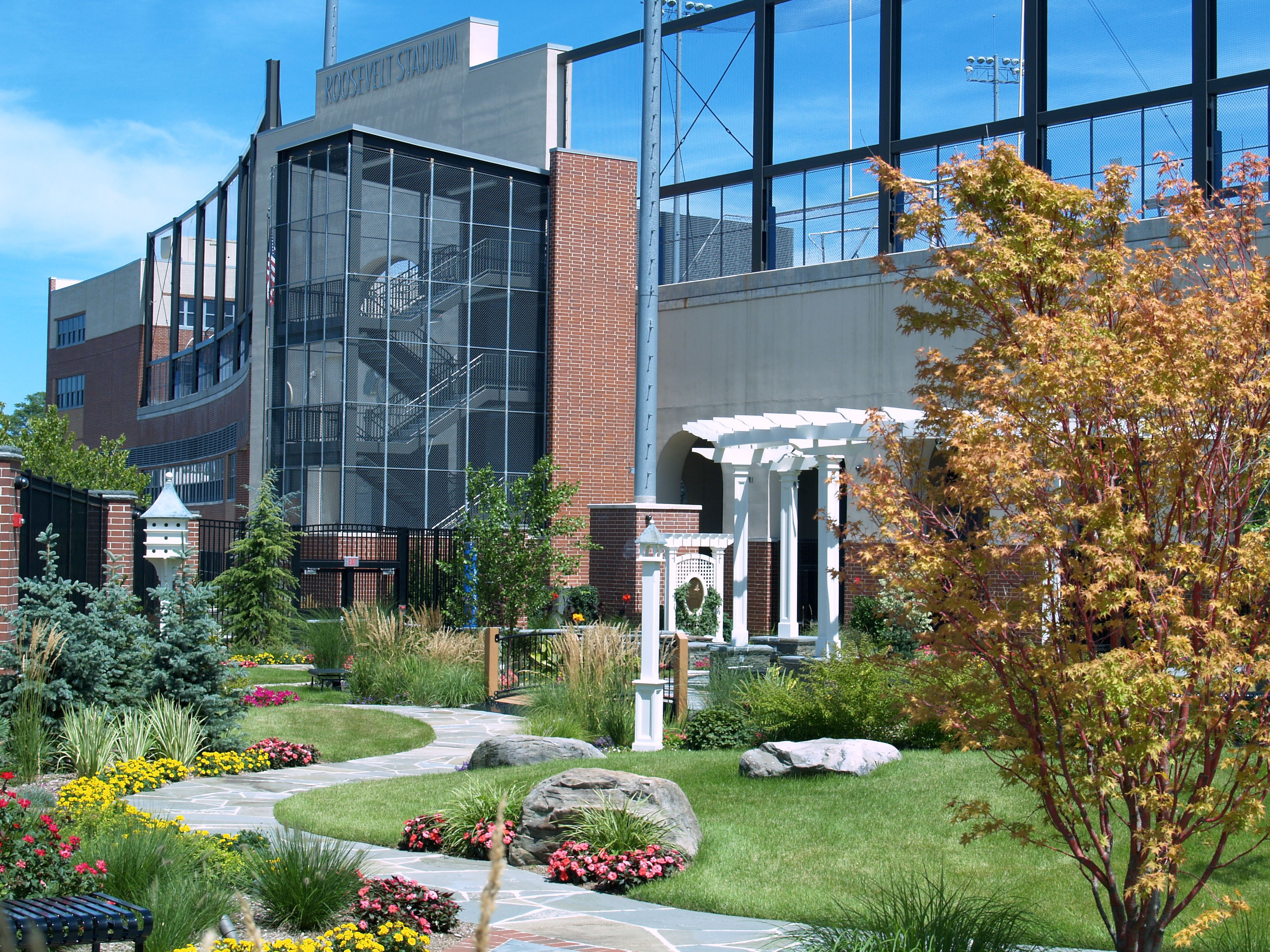
The Student Sanctuary, seen shortly after it opened

The commencement ceremony for the school's first graduating class was held on June 23, 2010. Delivering the keynote speech to the 600-plus graduates was New Jersey State Associate Supreme Court Justice Roberto A. Rivera-Soto. Subsequent commencement keynotes have been delivered by Judge Esther Salas, and former New Jersey Governor Jim McGreevey.

On October 28, 2011, the city broke ground on the school's $930,000, state-funded Student Sanctuary, a 16,900-square-foot (1,570 m^{2}), triangular landscaped pedestrian plaza in front of the school at the corner of Kennedy Boulevard at 24th Street. On December 18, 2012, the school's 50-year time capsule was filled with items representing the school and then buried on the Sanctuary grounds, with a scheduled opening in 2061. The Sanctuary, which was designed by Becica Associates L.L.C., Borst Landscape and Design, and Environmental Resolutions Inc., was opened with a ribbon-cutting ceremony on May 22, 2013, marking the completion of the school. It features a small amphitheater, a rain garden, a functioning waterfall, a fountain, brick-paved walkways, patios, and more than 100 different species of all-season shrubs and grasses, which provide research opportunities for the school's environmental sciences classes and its horticultural and environment clubs. The amphitheater is wired to host performances and other events.

== Faculty and staff ==
Former athlete Otis Davis, who won two gold medals in track and field events at the 1960 Summer Olympics, works at Union City High School as coach, mentor, and verification officer.

In July 2012, ESL teacher Kristine Nazzal was named Hudson County's 2012-13 Teacher of the Year by the New Jersey Department of Education. Nazzal was among 300 teachers who appeared on the September 23, 2012, episode of NBC Nightly News with Brian Williams to discuss issues pertaining to education.

In October 2015, Kimberly Moreno, who teaches anatomy, physiology and other health science courses at the school as part of a partnership with Rutgers University, was one of 40 educators in the United States awarded the Milken Educator Award, which gives $25,000 USD to early- to mid-career educators who demonstrate excellence in education, and potential for future accomplishments.

== Academic achievements ==
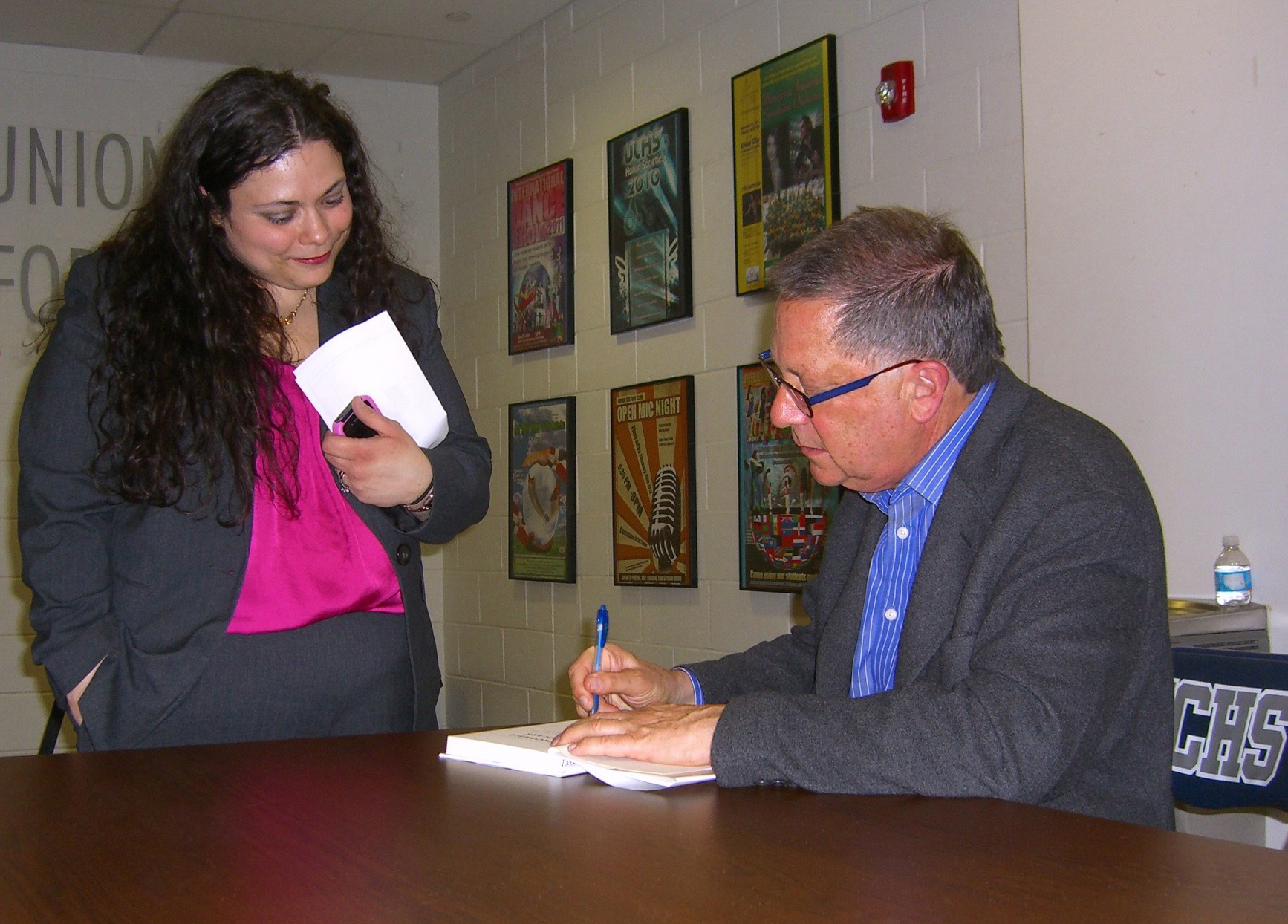
UCHS teacher Kristine Nazzal, who was named Hudson County Teacher of the year in 2012, getting her copy of Improbable Scholars signed by Professor David L. Kirp at an event held at the school. In the book, Kirp spotlights Union City's education system, in particular UCHS.

The school was the 301st-ranked public high school in New Jersey out of 339 schools statewide in New Jersey Monthly magazine's September 2014 cover story on the state's "Top Public High Schools", using a new ranking methodology. The school had been ranked 323rd in the state of 328 schools in 2012. The magazine ranked the two predecessor schools 271st (Emerson) and 285th (Union Hill) out of 322 public high schools statewide, in the magazine's September 2010 cover story on the state's "Top Public High Schools", after being ranked 288th (Emerson) and 233rd (Union Hill) in 2008 out of 316 public high schools statewide.

University of California, Berkeley Professor David L. Kirp, in his 2011 book, Kids First, and his 2013 book, Improbable Scholars, praised Union City's education system for bringing poor, mostly immigrant children (three quarters of whom live in homes where only Spanish is spoken and a quarter of whom are thought to be undocumented and fearful of deportation) into the educational mainstream. Kirp, who spent a year in Union City examining its schools, notes that while in the late 1970s, Union City schools faced the threat of state takeover, as of 2013 they boast achievement scores that approximate the statewide average. Kirp also observes that in 2011, Union City boasted a high school graduation rate of 89.5 percent — roughly 10 percentage points higher than the national average, and that in 2012, 75 percent of Union City graduates enrolled in college, with top students winning scholarships to the Ivy League. Kirp attributes Union City's success to among other things, the positive educational atmosphere of Union City High School generated by educators such as principal John Bennetti. Deborah Short of the Center for Applied Linguistics in Washington, D.C. singled out the school's initiatives, saying that the Union City High School "has created a culture that respects differences and promotes learning. The school expects its students to do well and it gives them lots of support."

== Facilities ==
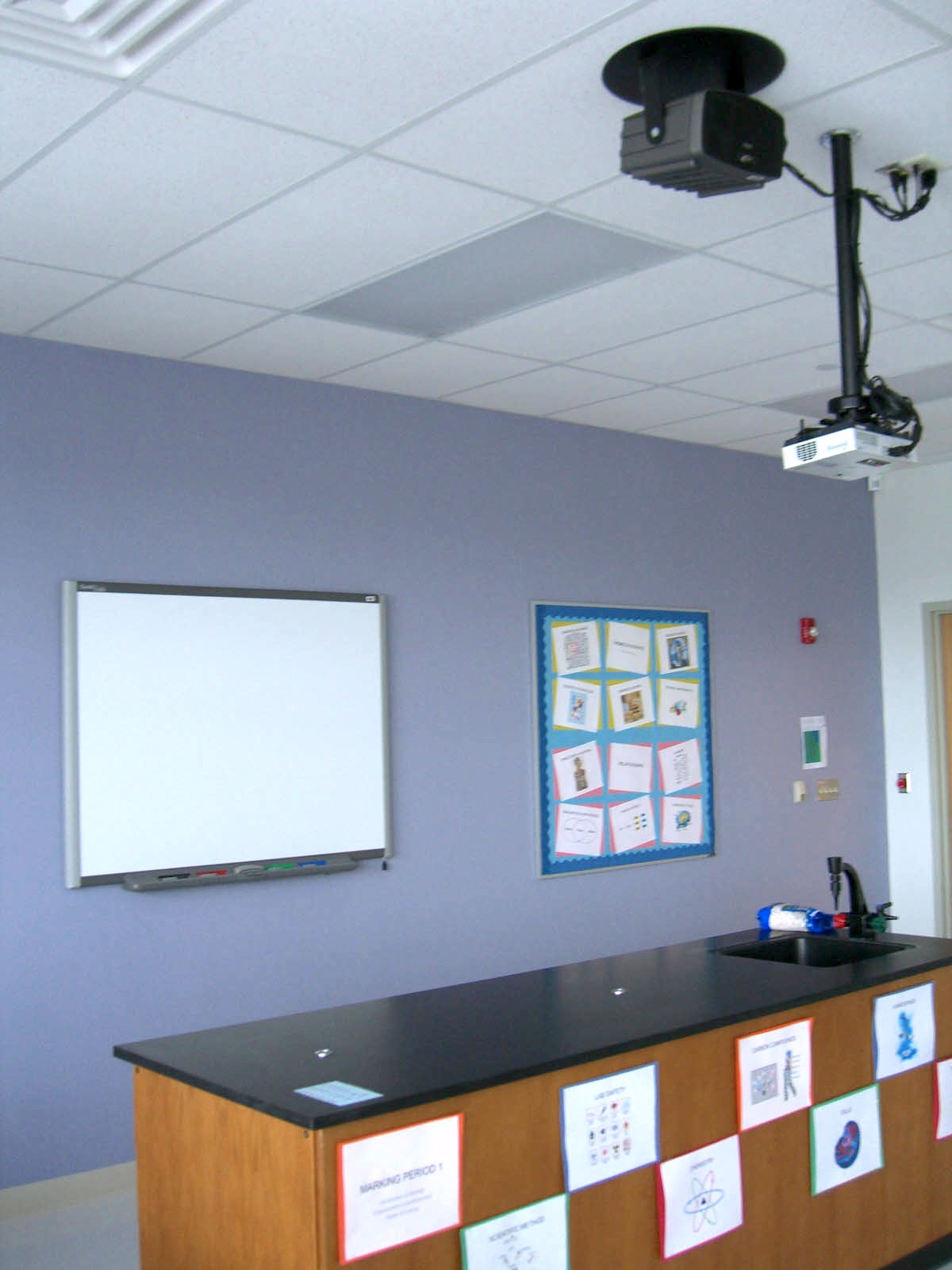
A science classroom equipped with an overhead projector and a SMART Board

The 360,000-square-foot (33,000 m^{2}) school houses 66 classrooms equipped with Mac computers, automatic lights, SMART Boards and Wi-Fi to enable students to use Laptop computers in their studies.

The arts are served by two art class rooms devoted to painting, sculpture and pottery, sewing machine-equipped rooms for fashion classes, television production facilities, and three music classrooms, each of which is equipped with grand pianos. Dancers have two separate rooms with floor to ceiling mirrors and ballet bars. The school's cafeteria is located on the second floor.

The school's gym includes bleachers that seat 1,800 people, and a weight room accessible directly from the gym. Elsewhere on the first floor is an aerobics room that houses cardio exercise machines.

A centrally located Media Center is located on the first floor and includes dozens of Mac computers. Although it was initially suggested to name the room after Pulitzer Prize-winning poet and United States Poet Laureate W. S. Merwin, who grew up in Union City, it was eventually named for former New Jersey Governor Jim McGreevey. It is located next to the outdoor Senior Courtyard. An American flag that stands in that courtyard, when raised, overlooks the athletic field. The Media Center is also used for community functions, such as an April 2011 book signing by Professor David L. Kirp.

The school's centerpiece is its 3-acre (1.2 ha) athletic field, called the Eagle's Nest, located on the second-floor roof, an idea modeled on a field situated on top of a parking garage on the campus of Georgetown University. The field features skyline views of the Empire State Building and Midtown Manhattan. The architecture of the athletic complex, which cost $15 million, was designed to resemble the former Roosevelt Stadium, which previously occupied the site. A number of classrooms on the third and fourth floors overlook the field, which rests on two floors of steel and reinforced concrete. The field's bleachers seat 2,100 spectators. The field's on-campus location eliminates not only the students' prior need to walk or be bussed from school to a separate location to play, but the need for the two prior schools to share the field. Although the merger of the former Union Hill Hillers and Emerson Bulldogs had experienced some difficulties a year prior when the students were still housed at separate high schools (called Union City High School's North and South campuses, respectively), the merge had been ameliorated by the move of the unified student body to the single new school. The athletic facility has been singled out as one of the most unusual in the United States. It was included in MaxPreps' 2012 list of "10 more high school football stadiums to see before you die". Due to the athletic field's unique location, it deals with unusual logistical challenges, such as balls that land on the streets surrounding the school; space limitations that place the band close to the visitors' sideline, thus making it sometimes difficult to hear; and games that are interrupted by school fire drills.

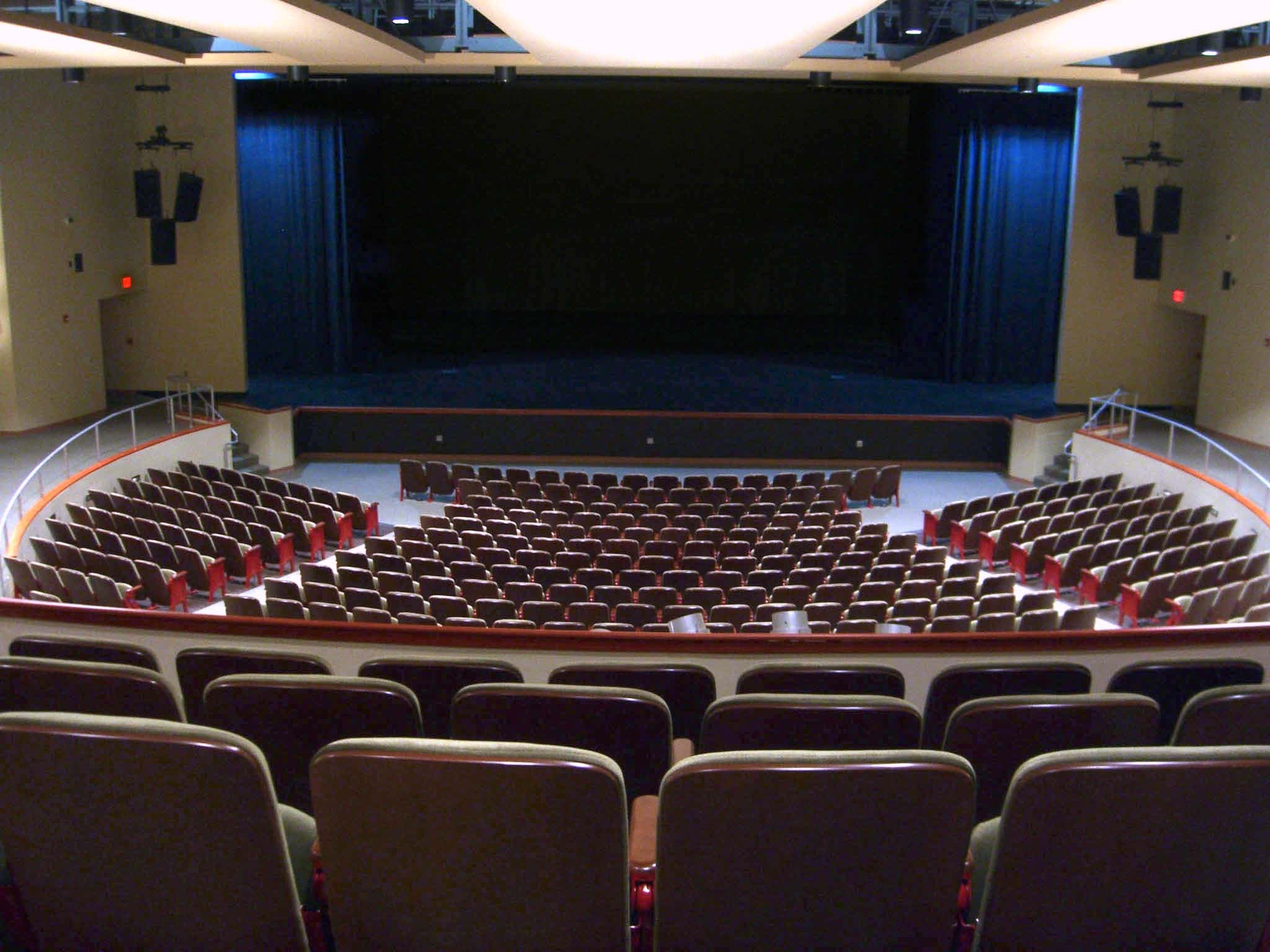
The school's 910-seat auditorium, which also serves as the Union City Performing Arts Center

The school's 910-seat auditorium also serves as the Union City Performing Arts Center. The Center opened on October 16, 2009 with a celebration that featured an art gallery of over 160 paintings, as well as performances by a number of musicians, poets and dancers. Included in the performances were a guitar solo by Francisco "Pancho" Navarro, who appeared in 2002 Salma Hayek film Frida, a dance performance by Tap Ole Dance Company that was choreographed by Megan Fernandez, who had appeared on the reality television program America's Got Talent, and a poetry reading by Graciela Barreto, who had been named poet laureate of Union City in September. Drama classes are aided with a separate black box theater for small productions, which doubles as a community conference center. Public events used by the auditorium including the 2010 swearing-in ceremony for Union City Mayor Brian P. Stack, and the Union City International Film Festival, the first one of which was held in December 2010. The school's athletic field and auditorium are made available to local residents in order to utilize the school as a community center for the city.

The federally funded, social services nonprofit group, North Hudson Community Action Corporation's (NHCAC) pediatric health center, which is housed in the building, opened in early July 2010, in order to allow the corporation's facilities on 31st Street to expand its women's health and internal medicine capacity. The center was opened in July so that the patient flow could be monitored when students were not in school, in order to determine how to integrate the center's operations with the school's, educate students on managing their health, and allow them to utilize its services in order to decrease health-related absenteeism, once the school session resumed. Union City Superintendent of Schools Stanley Sanger indicated that eventually, health screenings would be provided to all Union City students. NHCAC runs a health screening facility six days a week by two doctors. The facility has a separate entrance/exit from the street, and is closed off to the rest of the school. The 2,286-square-foot (212.4 m^{2}) full pediatric facility includes four private examination rooms and an on-site laboratory. It is open to low-income Hudson County families and sees approximately 20-25 patients 18 and under daily, charging sliding scale fees for its services, though NHCAC President and city commissioner Christopher Irizarry expressed hopes to eventually increase that capacity to 50 patients a day. It is the third of NHCAC's ten such facilities in North Hudson, New Jersey to implement electronic health record-keeping, which allows patients to schedule appointments online, see doctors more quickly and facilitate quicker lab results and filling of prescriptions at pharmacies.

The staff's parking garage, built a block south of the school, also serves nearby residents and business.

== Athletics ==
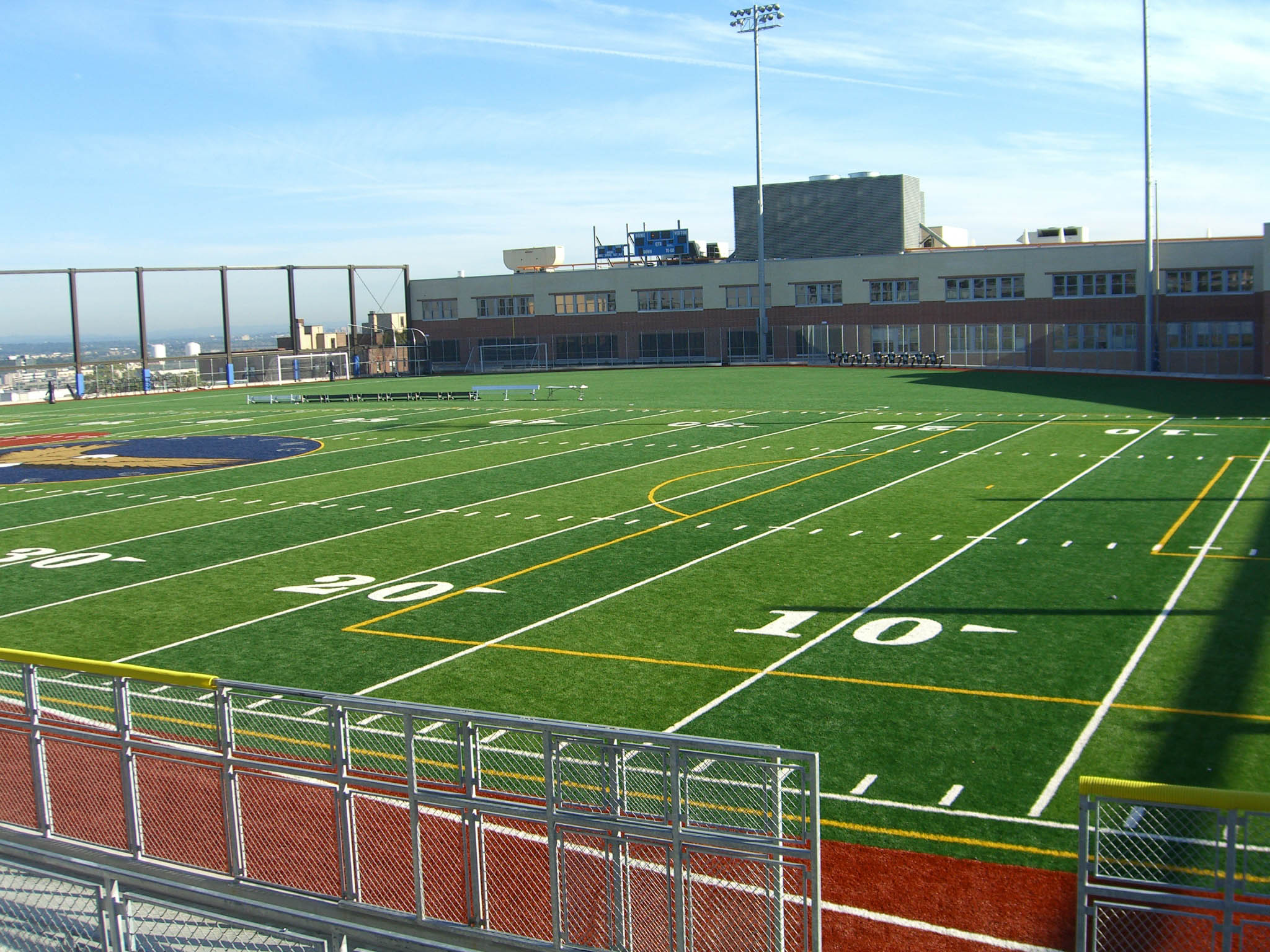
The school's athletic field, called the Eagle's Nest, is located on the second floor roof.

The Union City High School Soaring Eagles compete in the Hudson County Interscholastic League, which is comprised of public and private high schools in Hudson County and was established following a reorganization of sports leagues in North Jersey by the New Jersey State Interscholastic Athletic Association (NJSIAA). Prior to the 2010 realignment, the school had been assigned to the North Jersey Tri-County Conference for the 2009-10 season. With 2,713 students in grades 10-12, the school was classified by the NJSIAA for the 2019–20 school year as Group IV for most athletic competition purposes, which included schools with an enrollment of 1,060 to 5,049 students in that grade range. The football team competes in the Liberty Red division of the North Jersey Super Football Conference, which includes 112 schools competing in 20 divisions, making it the nation's biggest football-only high school sports league. The school was classified by the NJSIAA as Group V North for football for 2024–2026, which included schools with 1,317 to 5,409 students.

Union City High school fields interscholastic teams in football, wrestling, basketball, soccer, volleyball, bowling, baseball, cross county, swimming, softball, bowling, tennis and track and field.

Union City High School's football team has a rivalry with North Bergen High School, with Union City leading 6–4 through 2017. NJ.com listed the rivalry at number 30 on its 2017 list "Ranking the 31 fiercest rivalries in N.J. HS football". The team won their first North II Group V state sectional title in 2023 with a 24–17 against Phillipsburg High School in the championship game played at Maloney Stadium.

The boys basketball team won the North I Group IV sectional final against Hackensack High School in a 58–54 victory in 2019, coming back from an 18-point deficit to win the program's first title.

== Administration ==
The school's principal is Ryan Lewis. His core administration team includes three assistant principals.

== Notable alumni ==
- Steven Gonzalez (born 1997), American football guard for the St. Louis Battlehawks of the United Football League
