= Emerson High School (Union City, New Jersey) =

Former high school in Hudson County, New Jersey, United States

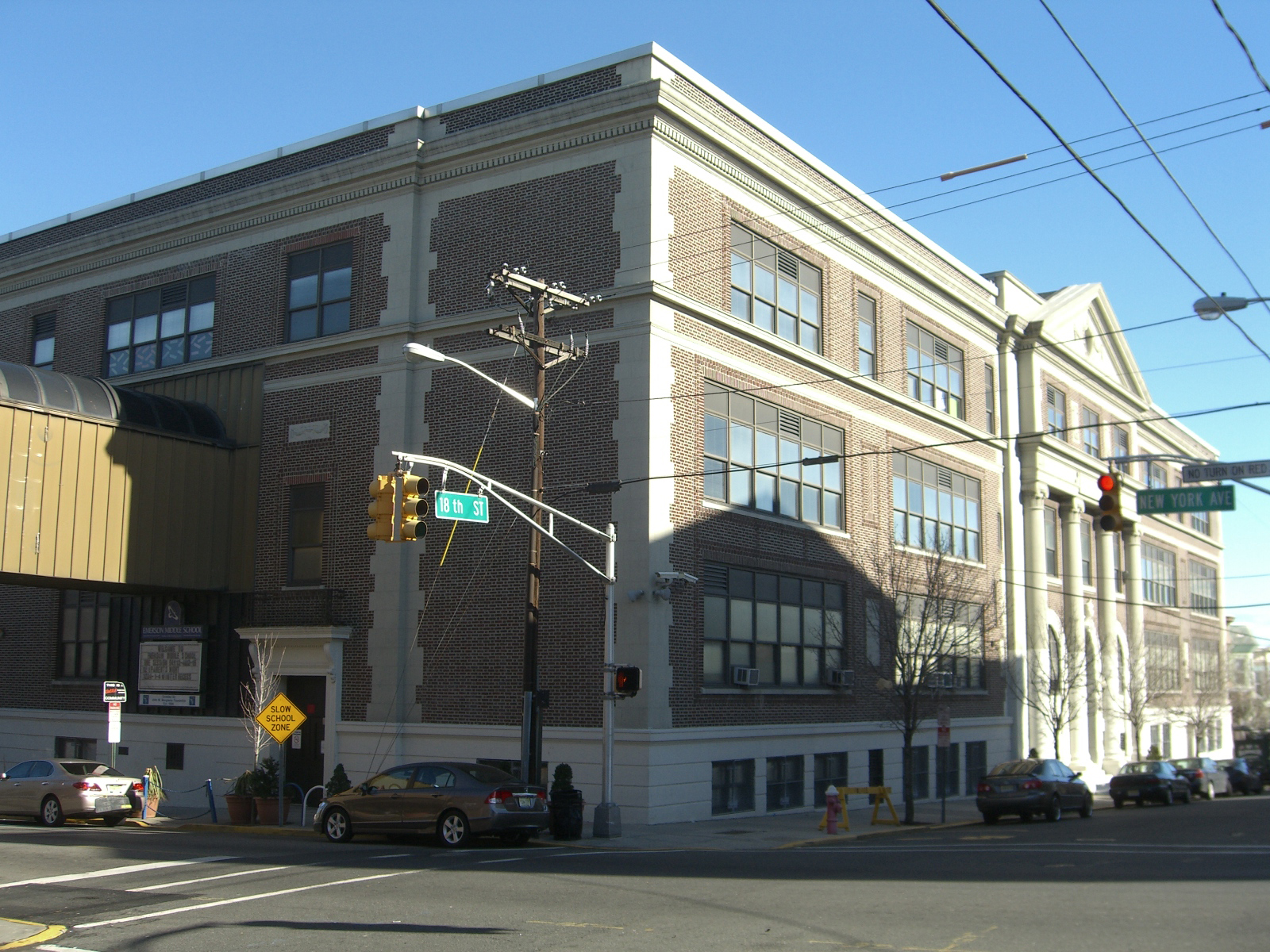
- Main building, with the eastern terminus of the bridge connecting it to the gym building visible at left

Location
- 318 18th Street; Union City, New Jersey 07087; United States; 40°45′46″N 74°01′58″W

Information
- Type: Public
- Closed: June 2008
- School district: Union City School District
- Grades: 9–12
- Colors: Blue and White
- Athletics conference: Hudson County Interscholastic Athletic Association
- Team name: Bulldogs

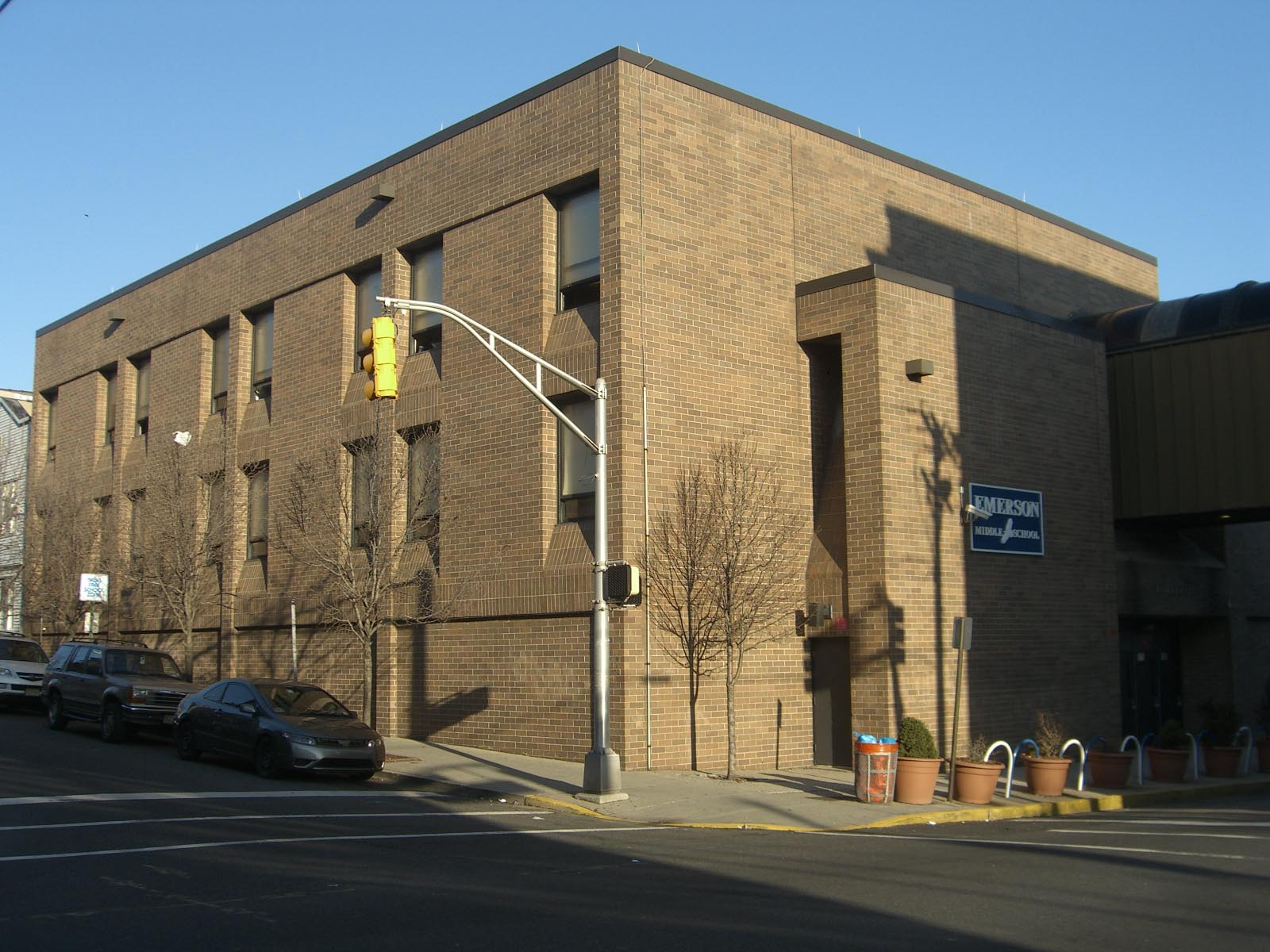
The gym building, connected to the main building via a second floor bridge that runs over New York Avenue

Emerson High School was a public high school located in Union City, in Hudson County, in the U.S. state of New Jersey, serving students in ninth through twelfth grades as part of the Union City Board of Education. The school was originally one of two high schools in Union City, along with Union Hill High School, that served the city's students. With the merger of both schools into the new Union City High School in 2008 and the opening of that school's new campus in 2009, both of the former high schools were converted to serve sixth, seventh, and eighth graders. The former Emerson High School is now Emerson Middle School.

== History ==
Emerson High School was originally the sole high school to serve the municipality of West Hoboken, New Jersey. In 1925, West Hoboken merged with its neighbor to the north, Union Hill, New Jersey, which had been served by Union Hill High School, to form the city of Union City, New Jersey. As the city was now served by two high schools, students who lived north of the Route 495 overpass (which previously divided the two towns) would attend Union Hill, while those who lived south of it would attend Emerson, though that boundary was shifted in later years to keep the school enrollments roughly equal.

By 2007, both Union Hill and Emerson, which are separated by one mile, had close to 1,500 students and offered the same schedule, courses and after-school sports, and their test scores and student demographics were comparable. Unlike Emerson, Union Hill did not have a Reserve Officers' Training Corps program, though Union Hill had a stronger arts program than Emerson, and both schools had different career education programs that allowed students to pursue interests like child care, hospitality and fashion (the city was once known for its embroidery factories). Superintendent of Schools Stanley M. Sanger stated in 2007 that he received 25 to 40 requests a year from students who want to switch to the rival high school due to a particular academic interest or a family connection. Most such requests were granted.

The school was the 288th-ranked public high school in New Jersey out of 316 schools statewide, in New Jersey Monthly magazine's September 2008 cover story on the state's Top Public High Schools. The school was ranked 265th in the magazine's September 2006 issue, which surveyed 316 schools across the state.

From 2003 to 2007, the school had a student enrollment that fluctuated slightly above or below 1,500, with a 2003 enrollment of 1,516 and a 2007 enrollment of 1,449. Its average class size in 2003 was 17.4 students, compared to a state average of 19.2, while its 2007 class size was 20.7, compared to a state average of 18.8. Its 2003 student-faculty ratio was 10.4, compared to a state average of 11.5, while its 2007 student-faculty ratio was 12.4, compared to a state average of 11.0. On City-Data, which scores schools from 0 (worst) to 100 (best), Emerson High School was given a score of 12, based on 2010 test scores. This compares with a citywide score of 10, a county score of 21 and a state score of 55. The school's 2007 graduation rate was 86.1 percent, compared to a state average of 87.9.

Through the 2007–08 school year, Emerson High School was one of two high schools to serve Union City, along with Union Hill High School. The last graduating class for both schools was in June 2008. The student bodies of both schools were to merge into the new Union City High School, which is housed in a building on the site of the former Roosevelt Stadium. The switch was originally planned for September 2008, but the school was not completed by then, and pending the completion, Union Hill and Emerson became known as the north and south campuses of Union City High School, respectively. The new school opened September 3, 2009, with Emerson and Union Hill High Schools converting into middle schools.

== Athletics ==
In 1939, Emerson High School's football team gained first place in the Hudson County scholastic football by defeating St. Michael's High School, 7–6, before 5,500 spectators. It was the third straight victory for Emerson and St. Michael's first defeat in eleven games since the start of the 1938 season.

Emerson High School competed in the Hudson County Interscholastic Athletic Association (HCIAA), which includes private and parochial high schools in Hudson County. The league operates under the supervision of the New Jersey State Interscholastic Athletic Association (NJSIAA).

The boys basketball team won the 2000 North I, Group III state sectional championship as the sixth seed with wins over Northern Valley Regional High School at Demarest, Pascack Valley High School and Northern Highlands Regional High School to reach the championship game and a 54–51 win over the fifth seed, Fort Lee High School in the championship game played at Passaic County Technical Institute.

=== Turkey game ===
During Union Hill and Emerson's time as Union City's two high schools, the Union Hill Hillers and the Emerson Bulldogs were rivals in athletics. In competing for the Hudson County Interscholastic Football Championship, Union Hill beat Emerson five consecutive years from 1923 to 1927. In the November 1927 game, Union Hill beat their rivals 19 to 0 in front of a crowd of 12,000 people.

For 88 consecutive years, the most notable aspect of their rivalry on the field was the annual Turkey Game, held on Thanksgiving, a tradition that began in 1919, when the high schools served the neighboring towns of West Hoboken in the south and Union Hill in the north, a rivalry described as "simmering hatred" that gave the schools' principals cause to fear that the first game might turn lead to violence. That game ended in a tie of 0–0. When the towns of Union Hill and West Hoboken merged in 1925 to form the city of Union City, the Turkey Game remained, despite the fact that schools in the same district usually do not often compete directly against each other.

In the 1930s and 1940s, the Turkey Game attracted as many as 15,000 fans. A wooden chariot would be pulled around the field at halftime, carrying the football king and queen from the defending school, who were booed and pelted with paper when they got to the opposing side of Roosevelt Stadium. This part of the tradition fell into disuse by the early 1970s.

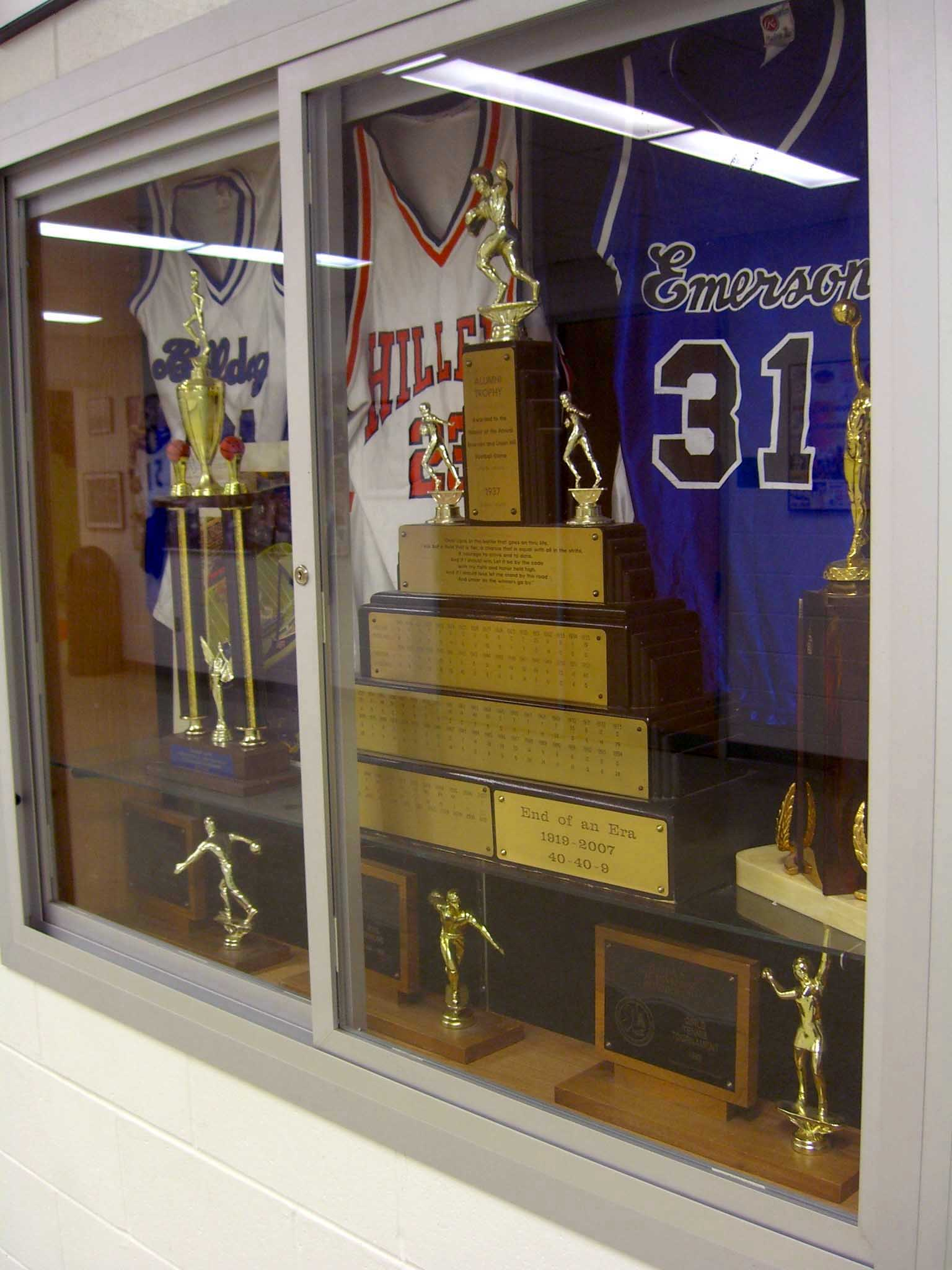
The Alumni Trophy, which was awarded to the victor of the annual Turkey Game, now sits in Union City High School. On the lower right of the trophy is the inscription: End of an Era 1919–2007 40–40–9

Stanley M. Sanger, who graduated from Emerson in 1969, and who never set foot in Union Hill until he became a teacher, characterized the Union Hill-Emerson rivalry by saying, "It’s our Mason-Dixon line. You knew Union Hill was north and Emerson was south, and you respected the boundary. It was the natural state of things." An old traditional greeting before the game was "Are we having hot turkey or cold turkey?", as the loser was said to eat "cold turkey", figuratively speaking. Over the decades, coaches were known to zealously guard their game plans and players, who were alert for spies, were often excused from their classes to practice in secret locations. When sharing Roosevelt Stadium for practice, they would use opposite ends of the 50 yard line. While the athletic coaches were not permitted to recruit players from the rival school, students were known to often recruit players from the elementary and middle schools to attend their high schools. A 50 lbs. brass trophy whose base is engraved with scores from every game, was passed back and forth between the two schools, and the winning school was rewarded with a half-day of school on the Monday after the game. According to David Wilcomes, a former football player and later football coach and the last principal of Union Hill High School, the Turkey Game developed a nearly religious significance as a Thanksgiving ritual for Union City citizens, and a loss for one's favored team would cast a pall upon the day's subsequent holiday festivities, commenting, "If you don’t win, it's a long Thanksgiving dinner." Wilcomes, whose father also played for Union Hill, stated that he stopped answering his home phone following losing games due to the constant reviewing and second-guessing of his strategies by various relatives. By 2007, the Union City district spent $130,000 annually on football.

Neither school was a regional powerhouse. Statistically, both endured cycles of consecutive wins and losses, and were roughly even in statistics, with Emerson having won 40 games, Union Hill, 39, and 9 ties. Union Hill won the 2006 game, while Emerson won the seven games prior. The Turkey Game tradition ended with its final game on November 22, 2007, prior to the two schools' merger into Union City High School, which is now housed on the site of the former Roosevelt Stadium, and features an athletic field on its roof. (During the year between the end of the Turkey Game and the September 2009 opening of Union City High School, the two schools shared the facilities at José Martí Middle School.) The district spent $2,000 on newspaper ads to invite alumni from around the state to the game, and to an alumni breakfast that preceded it. The district installed additional bleachers to accommodate an expected turnout of more than 4,000. It sold commemorative tickets featuring photos of the 1919 Union Hill and Emerson teams, and a game program whose proceeds went the new school's scholarship fund. During the final game, both principals sat together at halftime to present a united front, and the players on both teams were required to wear T-shirts bearing the new school's name under their shoulder pads. The final Turkey game was attended by 6,000 spectators, including Senator Robert Menendez (an alumnus of Union Hill), and saw Union Hill beat Emerson with a score of 20–8, tying Emerson's historical win record of 40–40.

The Turkey Game trophy is today housed in Union City High School, whose players are known as the Soaring Eagles. The end of the Turkey Game came amid waning Thanksgiving football traditions in communities across the United States, as earlier football seasons and competing holiday demands on players and their families made them less relevant. Post-holiday state championships have also overtaken such traditions in importance, as coaches grew reluctant to risk injury to players headed for the championships.

== Notable alumni ==
- Bob Hugin (born 1954, class of 1972), businessman who was formerly the executive chairman of Celgene
- Erick Morillo (1971–2020), DJ and music producer
- William Musto (1917–2006), politician who was mayor of Union City and served in the New Jersey General Assembly and New Jersey Senate, before being sentenced to prison for corruption
- Cliff Osmond (1937–2012), character actor, television screenwriter and acting teacher
- Carlos Rendo (born 1964), attorney and politician who is mayor of Woodcliff Lake and was the nominee for Lieutenant Governor of New Jersey in the 2017 gubernatorial election
- Esther Salas (class of 1987), the first Hispanic woman to serve as a United States magistrate judge in the District of New Jersey and the first to be appointed a U.S. District Court judge in New Jersey
- Brian P. Stack (born 1966), Union City mayor, Assemblyman and State Senator
- Francesca Sterlacci, fashion designer, author and entrepreneur
- Peter Urban (1934–2004), martial artist who established a karate style named American GōJū Ryū Karate
- Walter Walsh (1907-2014), FBI agent, Marine Corps shooting instructor and Olympic shooter
- Alan Weiss (born 1946), entrepreneur, author and public speaker
- Frank Winters (born 1964), former center for the Green Bay Packers

== Notable faculty ==
- Otis Davis (born 1932), winner of gold medals in both the 400 m and 4 × 400 m relay at the 1960 Summer Olympics, who was a truancy officer at Emerson
- Anthony Louis Scarmolin (1890–1969), Italian-American composer, pianist and conductor, who was the administrator for the concert and band programs at Emerson High School
