= José Martí STEM Academy =

High School in Hudson County, New Jersey, US

Location
- 1800 Summit Avenue; Union City, Hudson County, New Jersey 07087; United States
- 40.7656°N 74.0382°W

Information
- Type: Public high school
- Established: 2019
- School district: Union City School District
- NCES School ID: 341638003074
- Principal: Rudy Baez
- Faculty: 55.0 FTEs
- Grades: 9-12
- Enrollment: 625 (as of 2024–25)
- Student to teacher ratio: 11.4:1
- Website: jmsa.ucboe.us

José Martí STEM Academy is a four-year comprehensive public high school serving students in ninth through twelfth grades from Union City, in Hudson County, in the U.S. state of New Jersey, operating as part of the Union City Board of Education. The school focuses on Science, technology, engineering, and mathematics (STEM) education.

As of the 2024–25 school year, the school had an enrollment of 625 students and 55.0 classroom teachers (on an FTE basis), for a student–teacher ratio of 11.4:1. There were 394 students (63.0% of enrollment) eligible for free lunch and 71 (11.4% of students) eligible for reduced-cost lunch.

== History ==
Established in 2019, the school had originally operated as a freshman academy that allowed ninth graders to transition into high school.

== Administration ==
The school's principal is Rudy Baez. His core administration team includes two assistant principals.
