= Union City School District (New Jersey) =

School district in Hudson County, New Jersey, US

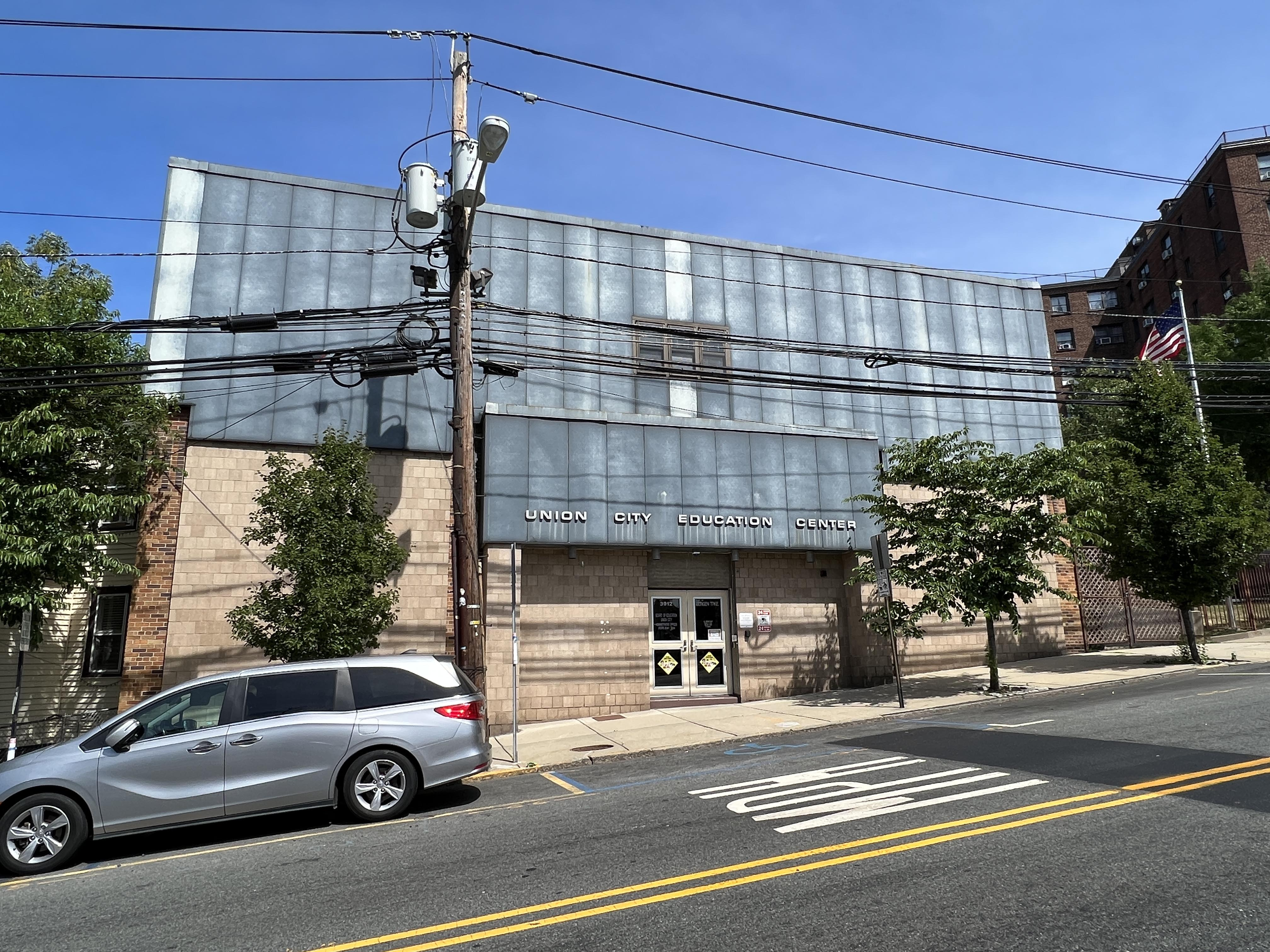
- The Union City Board of Education building

Address
- 3912 Bergen Turnpike Union City, Hudson County, New Jersey, 07087; United States
- Coordinates: 40.778268°N 74.031458°W

District information
- Grades: PreK-12
- Superintendent: Silvia Abbato
- Business administrator: Anthony N. Dragona (Business Administrator); Justin Mercado (Board Secretary)
- Schools: 14
- Affiliation: Former Abbott district

Students and staff
- Enrollment: 12,848 (as of 2022–23)
- Faculty: 858.0 FTEs
- Student–teacher ratio: 15.0:1

Other information
- District Factor Group: A
- Website: www.ucboe.us
Ind.	Per pupil	District spending	Rank (*)	K-12 average	%± vs. average
1A	Total Spending	$20,546	82	$18,891	8.8%
1	Budgetary Cost	17,075	90	14,783	15.5%
2	Classroom Instruction	8,555	45	8,763	−2.4%
6	Support Services	3,349	97	2,392	40.0%
8	Administrative Cost	1,404	44	1,485	−5.5%
10	Operations & Maintenance	3,293	103	1,783	84.7%
13	Extracurricular Activities	112	5	268	−58.2%
16	Median Teacher Salary	64,900	51	64,043
Data from NJDoE 2014 Taxpayers' Guide to Education Spending. *Of K-12 districts with more than 3,500 students. Lowest spending=1; Highest=103

Union City School District is a comprehensive community public school district that serves students in pre-kindergarten through twelfth grade in Union City, in the U.S. state of New Jersey. The district is one of 31 former Abbott districts statewide that were established pursuant to the decision by the New Jersey Supreme Court in Abbott v. Burke, which are now referred to as "SDA Districts" based on the requirement for the state to cover all costs for school building and renovation projects in these districts under the supervision of the New Jersey Schools Development Authority.

As of the 2022–23 school year, the district, comprised of 14 schools, had an enrollment of 12,848 students and 858.0 classroom teachers (on an FTE basis), for a student–teacher ratio of 15.0:1.

The district is classified by the New Jersey Department of Education as being in District Factor Group "A", the lowest of eight groupings. District Factor Groups organize districts statewide to allow comparison by common socioeconomic characteristics of the local districts. From lowest socioeconomic status to highest, the categories are A, B, CD, DE, FG, GH, I and J.

== History ==
The city's single public high school, Union City High School, opened September 3, 2009, and was built on the site of the former Roosevelt Stadium. The $178 million school, whose signature feature is an athletic field on its second-floor roof, replaced the former Emerson High School and Union Hill High School, which were then converted to middle schools.

In conjunction with the Schools Development Authority, the district is constructing the new $93.7 million Esther Salas Academy for grades seven through nine that is expected to open for the 2025–26 school year, and will accommodate as many as 900 students in a six-story building covering 132,000 square feet (12,300 m^{2}).

== Awards and recognition ==
Woodrow Wilson School was awarded the Blue Ribbon School Award of Excellence by the United States Department of Education, the highest award an American school can receive, during the 2004–05 school year. The Blue Ribbon School Award of Excellence was awarded again to Woodrow Wilson for the 2014–15 school year.

== Schools ==
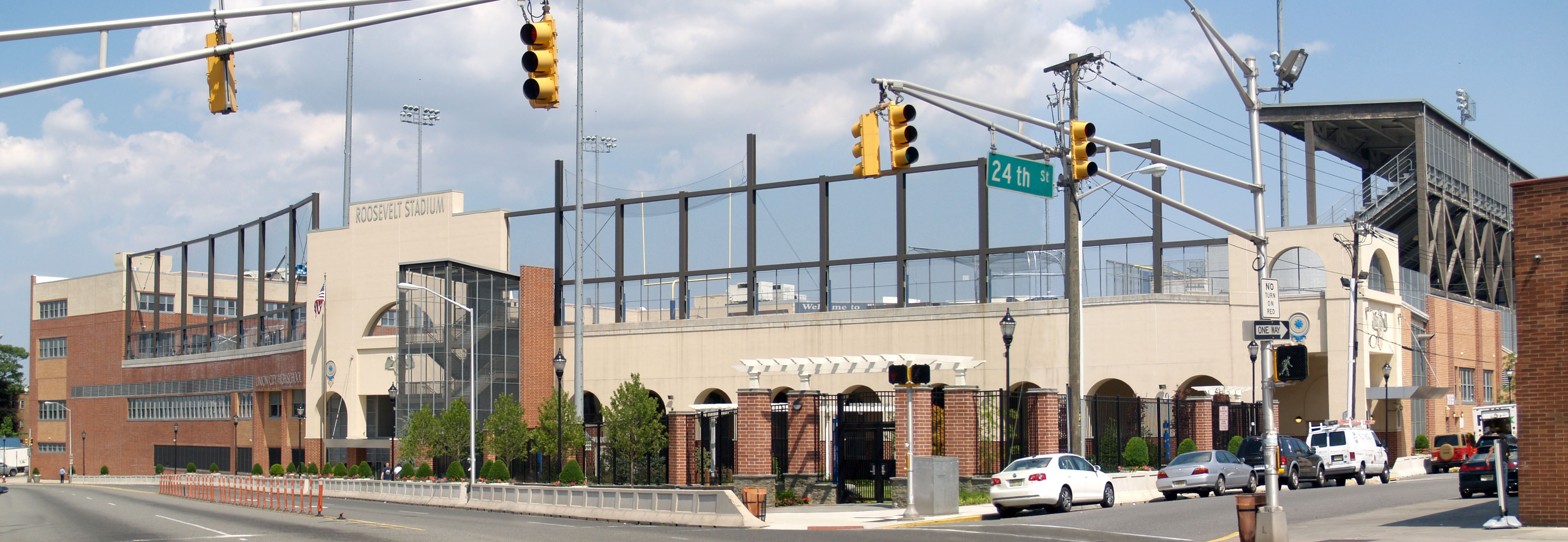
Union City High School

Schools in the district (with 2022–23 enrollment data from the National Center for Education Statistics) are:

Preschool

- Eugenio Maria de Hostos Center for Early Childhood Education (279; grades PreK-K)

Elementary schools

- Thomas A. Edison Elementary School (839; PreK–6)
- Sara Gilmore Academy School (390; 1–8)
- Henry Hudson Elementary School (295; PreK–3)
- Jefferson Elementary School (302; PreK–4)
- Colin Powell Elementary School (721; K–5)
- Theodore Roosevelt School (919; K–6)
- Veteran's Memorial Elementary School (551; PreK–5)
- George Washington Elementary School (779; PreK–6)
- Robert Waters Elementary School (976; PreK–6)

Middle schools

- Emerson Middle School (1,001; 6–8)
- Union Hill Middle School (849; 7–8)
- Ester Salas Academy (NA; 7-9)

High school

- José Martí STEM Academy (664; 9–12)
- Union City High School (3,025; 9–12)

Adult education

- Union City Adult Learning Center

== Administration ==
Core members of the district's administration are:

- Silvia Abbato, superintendent
- Anthony N. Dragona, business administrator
- Justin Mercado, board secretary

== Board of education ==
The district's board of education is comprised of seven members who set policy and oversee the fiscal and educational operation of the district through its administration. As a Type I school district, the board's trustees are appointed by the mayor to serve three-year terms of office on a staggered basis, with either two or three members up for reappointment each year. Of the more than 600 school districts statewide, Union City is one of approximately 12 districts with appointed school boards. The board appoints a superintendent to oversee the district's day-to-day operations and a business administrator to supervise the business functions of the district.
