= Roosevelt Stadium (Union City, New Jersey) =

Defunct sports stadium in Union City, New Jersey

Coordinates: 40.7703°N 74.0363°W

Roosevelt Stadium was an American outdoor sports facility located in Union City, New Jersey. The stadium was built in 1936 and demolished in 2005 so Union City High School could be built on the site. After the school was built, its athletic complex was also named Roosevelt Stadium; the current field is located atop the school.

It is not to be confused with the former baseball park of the same name in neighboring Jersey City, New Jersey.

== History ==
Originally the site of the Hudson County Consumers Brewery Company, the property was purchased by what is now Union City for US$456,000, and turned it into a gated playground. Later, through the efforts of Director of Public Affairs Harry J. Thourot, the stadium's construction was funded by the federal Works Progress Administration Project, which awarded the project US$172,472, as part of Franklin D. Roosevelt’s New Deal. Construction began on the stadium in 1936, with 350 men. Built in the art deco style, and modeled after the Colosseum and arenas of ancient Greece and Rome, the ribbon-cutting ceremony that opened it was held on November 25, 1937.

The stadium was bounded on the east by Summit Avenue and on the west by Kerrigan Avenue and Kennedy Boulevard (formerly Hudson Boulevard) between 24th and 26th Streets. Roosevelt Stadium stood 15 rows deep, and initially housed 7,000 people, with subsequent renovations enlarging that capacity to 11,000 and ultimately 18,000. The stadium also featured a tool house, dressing rooms, and a cafeteria.

Primarily a football stadium, future National Football League greats Lou Cordileone and Frank Winters played during their high school days at Roosevelt Stadium, as did College Football Hall of Famer Ed Franco. However, Roosevelt also housed events in semi-pro baseball, soccer, track, boxing, as well as numerous special events, from tractor pulls, concerts, carnivals and Fourth of July fireworks shows to an exhibition baseball game featuring Babe Ruth and Lou Gehrig.

On September 9, 1994, the city held a grand re-opening of the Stadium, after it had been renovated and modernized. These improvements included the addition of artificial sports turf to replace the outdated field that was often muddy or dusty.

== Turkey game ==
The stadium's most noteworthy annual event was the Thanksgiving football Turkey Game, held from 1919 - 2004 between long-time rivals Emerson High School's Bulldogs and Union Hill High School's Hillers. In competing for the Hudson County Interscholastic Football Championship, Union Hill beat Emerson five consecutive years from 1923 to 1927. During the November 1927 game, Union Hill beat their rivals 19 to 0 in front of a crowd of 12,000 people.

For 88 consecutive years, the most notable aspect of their rivalry on the field was the annual Turkey Game, held on Thanksgiving, a tradition that began in 1919, when the high schools served the neighboring towns of West Hoboken in the south and Union Hill in the north, a rivalry described as "simmering hatred" that gave the schools' principals cause to fear that the first game might turn ugly. That game ended in a tie of 0-0. When the towns of Union Hill and West Hoboken merged in 1925 to form the city of Union City, the Turkey Game remained, despite the fact that schools in the same district usually do not often compete directly against each other.

In the 1930s and 1940s, the Turkey Game attracted as many as 15,000 fans. A wooden chariot would be pulled around the field at halftime, carrying the football king and queen from the defending school, who were booed and pelted with paper when they got to the opposing side of Roosevelt Stadium. This part of the tradition fell into disuse by the early 1970s.

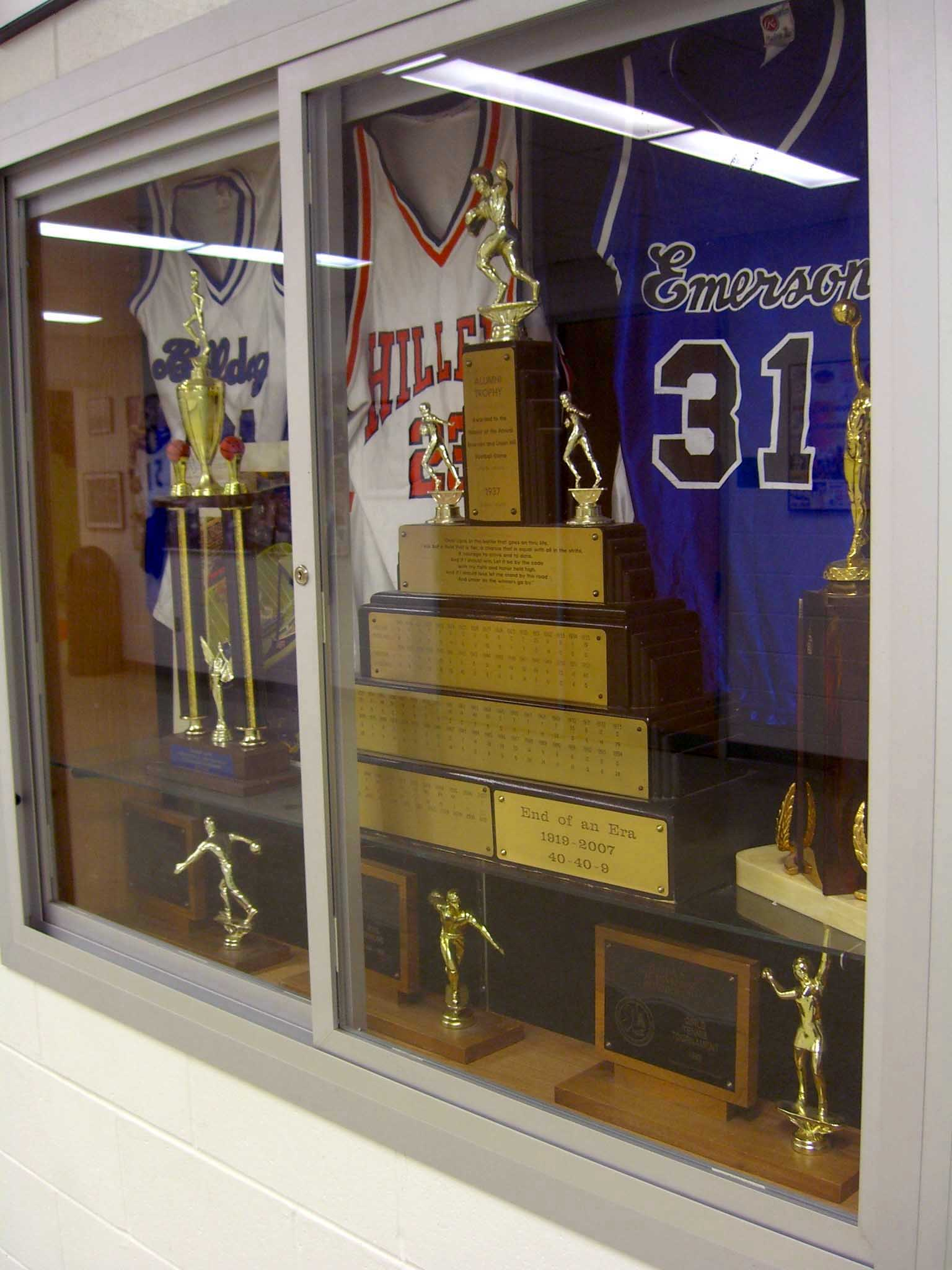
The Alumni Trophy, which was awarded to the victor of the annual Turkey Game, now sits in Union City High School. On the lower right of the trophy is the inscription: End of an Era 1919 - 2007 40-40-9.

Stanley M. Sanger, who graduated from Emerson in 1969, and who never set foot in Union Hill until he became a teacher, characterized the Union Hill-Emerson rivalry by saying, "It's our Mason-Dixon line. You knew Union Hill was north and Emerson was south, and you respected the boundary. It was the natural state of things." An old traditional greeting before the game was "Are we having hot turkey or cold turkey?", as the loser was said to eat "cold turkey", figuratively speaking. Over the decades, coaches were known to zealously guard their game plans and players, who were alert for spies, were often excused from their classes to practice in secret locations. When sharing Roosevelt Stadium for practice, they would use opposite ends of the 50 yard line. While the athletic coaches were not permitted to recruit players from the rival school, students were known to often recruit players from the elementary and middle schools to attend their high schools. A 50 lbs. brass trophy whose base is engraved with scores from every game, was passed back and forth between the two schools, and the winning school was rewarded with a half-day of school on the Monday after the game. According to David Wilcomes, a former football player and later football coach and the last principal of Union Hill High School, the Turkey Game developed a nearly religious significance as a Thanksgiving ritual for Union City citizens, and a loss for one's favored team would cast a pall upon the day's subsequent holiday festivities, commenting, "If you don’t win, it's a long Thanksgiving dinner." Wilcomes, whose father also played for Union Hill, stated that he stopped answering his home following losing games because his strategies would be endlessly reviewed and second-guessed by various relatives. By 2007, the Union City district spent $130,000 annually on football.

During a halftime ceremony held during the 1998 Turkey Game, Union City Mayor Raul Garcia dedicated the field of the stadium to the Emerson High School Hall of Fame great Joseph "Pep" Novotny, who had died less than a month prior. The phrase "Joseph 'Pep' Novotny Field" was later added beneath the words "Roosevelt Stadium" on the Kennedy Boulevard side of the stadium.

Neither school was a regional powerhouse. Statistically, both endured cycles of consecutive wins and losses, and were roughly even in statistics, with Emerson having won 40 games, Union Hill, 39, and 9 ties. Union Hill won the 2006 game, while Emerson won the seven games prior. The Turkey Game tradition ended with its final game on November 22, 2007, prior to the two schools' merger into Union City High School, which is now housed on the site of the former Roosevelt Stadium, and features an athletic field on its roof. (During the year between the end of the Turkey Game and the September 2009 opening of Union City High School, the two schools shared the facilities at José Martí Middle School.) The district spent $2,000 on newspaper ads to invite alumni from around the state to the game, and to an alumni breakfast that preceded it. The district installed additional bleachers to accommodate an expected turnout of more than 4,000. It sold commemorative tickets featuring photos of the 1919 Union Hill and Emerson teams, and a game program whose proceeds went the new school's scholarship fund. During the final game, both principals sat together at halftime to present a united front, and the players on both teams were required to wear T-shirts bearing the new school's name under their shoulder pads. The final Turkey game was attended by 6,000 spectators, including Senator Robert Menendez (an alumnus of Union Hill), and saw Union Hill beat Emerson with a score of 20–8, evening the rivalry at 40 wins apiece with nine ties.

The Turkey Game trophy is today housed in Union City High School, whose players are known as the Soaring Eagles. The end of the Turkey Game came amid waning Thanksgiving football traditions in communities across the United States, as earlier football season and competing holiday demands on players and their families have made them less relevant. Post-holiday state championships have also overtaken such traditions in importance, as coaches grew reluctant to risk injury to players headed for the championships.

== Demolition ==
The stadium was closed to make way for a new $136 million Union City High School and Union City Athletic Complex, which unites both Emerson High School and Union Hill High School into one high school. On July 11, 2005, acting New Jersey Governor Richard Codey and Union City Mayor Brian P. Stack, along with other officials, broke ground in preparation for the new complex. The interior of the stadium was razed and demolished the following month, and the stadium's exterior walls were demolished subsequently.

In commemoration of Roosevelt Stadium, the students of Union Hill High School, under the direction of business teacher Peter Drozd, began a website dedicated to the history of the stadium and the Turkey Game.

In early March 2006, a large piece of the Hudson Brewery's original brick foundation was found intact, along with the base of a manhole still connected to an original sewer that opened underneath the brewery. The artifacts were removed, and officials monitored the excavation for future discoveries of other artifacts for historical preservation.

Union City High School and Athletic Complex opened for students on September 3, 2009.
