= David L. Kirp =

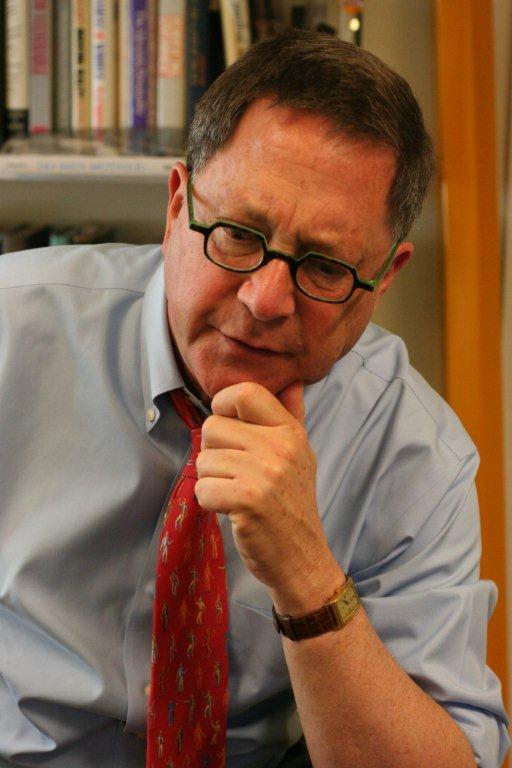
- Education: Amherst College; Harvard Law School
- Occupations: Professor, Goldman School of Public Policy, University of California-Berkeley, author and columnist
- Writing career
- Language: English
- Genre: Non-fiction
- Subjects: Social science, Public Policy
- Notable works: Improbable Scholars: The Rebirth of a Great American School System and a Blueprint for America's Schools, Kids First: Five Big Ideas for Transforming Children's Lives and America's Future, "The College Dropout Scandal"

Signature
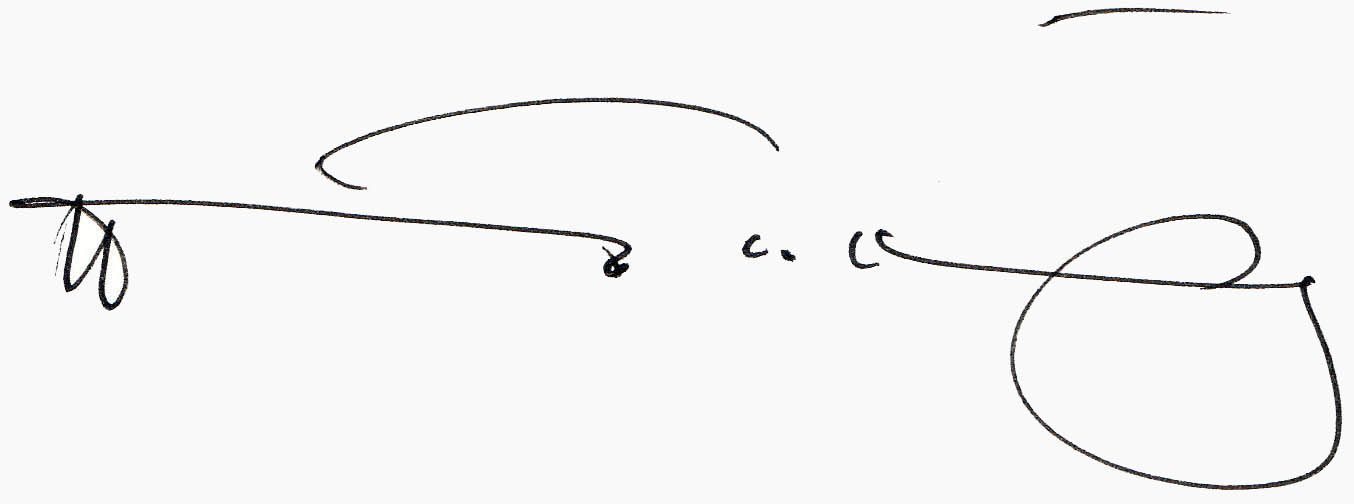

David Kirp is a professor at the Goldman School of Public Policy at the University of California, Berkeley, a member of the National Academy of Education, a contributing writer to The New York Times and a senior scholar at the Learning Policy Institute, a "think-and-do" tank. He is a Member of the American Academy of Arts and Sciences and the National Academy of Education. In his seventeen books and hundreds of articles, he has concentrated on pivotal education and youth issues from cradle to college and career.

== Education ==
Kirp graduated from Amherst College and Harvard Law School.

== Career ==
A former newspaper editor and syndicated columnist, David Kirp contributes to leading national print media outlets, including The New York Times, The Atlantic Monthly, the American Prospect and The Nation, and appears as a policy expert on nationally broadcast radio and televisions programs.

Kirp is a recipient of Berkeley's 1982 Distinguished Teaching Award.

David Kirp founded the Harvard Center on Law and Education, a national law reform organization that promotes equality of educational opportunity. He was a trustee of Amherst College and has served on numerous nonprofit boards, including Experience Corps, Friends of the Children, the Coro Leadership Center of San Francisco and the ACLU of Northern California. He served on President Barack Obama's transition team, where he drafted policy agendas for early education and community schools. He has consulted with many nonprofit groups and public agencies in the United States and abroad.

== Works ==
Among Kirp's books are The Sandbox Investment: The Universal Preschool Movement and Kids-First Politics and Shakespeare, Einstein and the Bottom Line: The Marketing of Higher Education.

The College Dropout Scandal focuses on the under-appreciated fact that half of undergraduates who enroll in public universities fail to graduate and shows, through narratives about colleges that buck this trend, what can be done to change the arc of students' lives.

Improbable Scholars: The Rebirth of a Great American School System and a Strategy for America's Schools details how a poor, Latino school district became a national model.
