= 1997 New Jersey General Assembly election =

- November 4, 1997

All 80 seats to the General Assembly 41 seats needed for a majority
- Turnout: 56% (▲18pp)

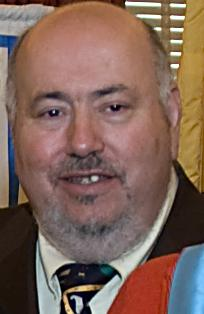
	Majority party	Minority party
Leader	Jack Collins	Joseph Doria (stepped down)
Party	Republican	Democratic
Leader since	January 9, 1996	January 12, 1988
Leader's seat	3rd (Gloucester City)	31st (Bayonne)
Last election	50	30
Seats won	48	32
Seat change	▼2	▲2
- Results: Republican gain Democratic gain Republican hold Democratic hold
Speaker before election
Jack Collins
Republican
Elected Speaker
Jack Collins
Republican

The 1997 New Jersey General Assembly elections were held on November 4, 1997, for all 80 seats in the lower house of the New Jersey Legislature. The election coincided with a gubernatorial election where Republican Christine Todd Whitman won. Republicans held a 50-30 majority in the lower house prior to the election. The members of the New Jersey Legislature are chosen from 40 electoral districts. Each district elects one state senator and two State Assembly members. New Jersey uses coterminous legislative districts for both its State Senate and General Assembly.

Republicans flipped one seat in the 4th. Democrats were able to flip one seat in the 6th and both in the 7th. After eight months in office, the courts threw out the results of the 1997 election in the 7th district for Democrat Jack Conners due to problems with 160 uncounted ballots from a voting machine that affected the results for the second seat. Conners was ordered to leave office in September 1998, and Republican Ken Faulkner was seated in his place. In a November 1998 special election, Conners defeated Faulkner by 5,500 votes and was sworn into office for a second time that year.

== Incumbents not seeking re-election ==
=== Democratic ===
- Sean F. Dalton, District 4
- Willie B. Brown, District 29
- Alberto Coutinho, District 29

=== Republican ===
- Diane Allen, District 7
- Carmine DeSopo, District 7
- Joann H. Smith, District 13
- Walter J. Kavanaugh, District 16
- Anthony R. Bucco, District 25

== Summary of results by district ==
Legislative District	Position	Incumbent	Party	Elected Assembly Member	Party
1st	1	Nicholas Asselta	Republican	Nicholas Asselta	Republican
1st	2	John C. Gibson	Republican	John C. Gibson	Republican
2nd	1	Kenneth LeFevre	Republican	Kenneth LeFevre	Republican
2nd	2	Francis J. Blee	Republican	Francis J. Blee	Republican
3rd	1	Jack Collins	Republican	Jack Collins	Republican
3rd	2	Gary Stuhltrager	Republican	Gary Stuhltrager	Republican
4th	1	Sean F. Dalton	Democrat	Gerald Luongo	Republican
4th	2	George Geist	Republican	George Geist	Republican
5th	1	Nilsa Cruz-Perez	Democrat	Nilsa Cruz-Perez	Democrat
5th	2	Joseph J. Roberts	Democrat	Joseph J. Roberts	Democrat
6th	1	Louis Greenwald	Democrat	Louis Greenwald	Democrat
6th	2	Mary Previte	Democrat	Mary Previte	Democrat
7th	1	Diane Allen	Republican	Herb Conaway	Democrat
7th	2	Carmine DeSopo	Republican	Jack Conners	Democrat
8th	1	Francis Bodine	Republican	Francis Bodine	Republican
8th	2	Larry Chatzidakis	Republican	Larry Chatzidakis	Republican
9th	1	Jeffrey Moran	Republican	Jeffrey Moran	Republican
9th	2	Christopher J. Connors	Republican	Christopher J. Connors	Republican
10th	1	James W. Holzapfel	Republican	James W. Holzapfel	Republican
10th	2	David W. Wolfe	Republican	David W. Wolfe	Republican
11th	1	Thomas S. Smith	Republican	Thomas S. Smith	Republican
11th	2	Steve Corodemus	Republican	Steve Corodemus	Republican
12th	1	Clare Farragher	Republican	Clare Farragher	Republican
12th	2	Michael Arnone	Republican	Michael Arnone	Republican
13th	1	Joann H. Smith	Republican	Samuel D. Thompson	Republican
13th	2	Joseph Azzolina	Republican	Joseph Azzolina	Republican
14th	1	Paul Kramer	Republican	Paul Kramer	Republican
14th	2	Barbara W. Wright	Republican	Barbara W. Wright	Republican
15th	1	Shirley Turner	Democrat	Shirley Turner	Democrat
15th	2	Reed Gusciora	Democrat	Reed Gusciora	Democrat
16th	1	Walter J. Kavanaugh	Republican	Peter Biondi	Republican
16th	2	Christopher Bateman	Republican	Christopher Bateman	Republican
17th	1	Bob Smith	Democrat	Bob Smith	Democrat
17th	2	Jerry Green	Democrat	Jerry Green	Democrat
18th	1	Peter Barnes	Democrat	Peter Barnes	Democrat
18th	2	Barbara Buono	Democrat	Barbara Buono	Democrat
19th	1	Arline Friscia	Democrat	Arline Friscia	Democrat
19th	2	John Wisniewski	Democrat	John Wisniewski	Democrat
20th	1	Neil M. Cohen	Democrat	Neil M. Cohen	Democrat
20th	2	Joseph Suliga	Democrat	Joseph Suliga	Democrat
21st	1	Joel Weingarten	Republican	Joel Weingarten	Republican
21st	2	Kevin J. O'Toole	Republican	Kevin J. O'Toole	Republican
22nd	1	Richard Bagger	Republican	Richard Bagger	Republican
22nd	2	Alan Augustine	Republican	Alan Augustine	Republican
23rd	1	Leonard Lance	Republican	Leonard Lance	Republican
23rd	2	Connie Myers	Republican	Connie Myers	Republican
24th	1	Guy Gregg	Republican	Guy Gregg	Republican
24th	2	Scott Garrett	Republican	Scott Garrett	Republican
25th	1	Anthony R. Bucco	Republican	Rick Merkt	Republican
25th	2	Michael Patrick Carroll	Republican	Michael Patrick Carroll	Republican
26th	1	Alex DeCroce	Republican	Alex DeCroce	Republican
26th	2	Carol J. Murphy	Republican	Carol J. Murphy	Republican
27th	1	LeRoy J. Jones Jr.	Democrat	LeRoy J. Jones Jr.	Democrat
27th	2	Nia Gill	Democrat	Nia Gill	Democrat
28th	1	Craig A. Stanley	Democrat	Craig A. Stanley	Democrat
28th	2	Wilfredo Caraballo	Democrat	Wilfredo Caraballo	Democrat
29th	1	Willie B. Brown	Democrat	William D. Payne	Democrat
29th	2	Alberto Coutinho	Democrat	Donald Kofi Tucker	Democrat
30th	1	Joseph Malone	Republican	Joseph Malone	Republican
30th	2	Melvin Cottrell	Republican	Melvin Cottrell	Republican
31st	1	Joseph Doria	Democrat	Joseph Doria	Democrat
31st	2	Joseph Charles	Democrat	Joseph Charles	Democrat
32nd	1	Joan M. Quigley	Democrat	Joan Quigley	Democrat
32nd	2	Anthony Impreveduto	Democrat	Anthony Impreveduto	Democrat
33rd	1	Louis Romano	Democrat	Louis Romano	Democrat
33rd	2	Raul Garcia	Democrat	Raul Garcia	Democrat
34th	1	Marion Crecco	Republican	Marion Crecco	Republican
34th	2	Gerald H. Zecker	Republican	Gerald H. Zecker	Republican
35th	1	Nellie Pou	Democrat	Nellie Pou	Democrat
35th	2	Alfred Steele	Democrat	Alfred Steele	Democrat
36th	1	Paul DiGaetano	Republican	Paul DiGaetano	Republican
36th	2	John V. Kelly	Republican	John V. Kelly	Republican
37th	1	Ken Zisa	Democrat	Ken Zisa	Democrat
37th	2	Loretta Weinberg	Democrat	Loretta Weinberg	Democrat
38th	1	Guy Talarico	Republican	Guy Talarico	Republican
38th	2	Rose Marie Heck	Republican	Rose Marie Heck	Republican
39th	1	Charlotte Vandervalk	Republican	Charlotte Vandervalk	Republican
39th	2	John E. Rooney	Republican	John E. Rooney	Republican
40th	1	Nicholas Felice	Republican	Nicholas Felice	Republican
40th	2	David C. Russo	Republican	David Russo	Republican

=== Close races ===
Districts where the difference of total votes between the top-two parties was under 10%:

1. District 4, 5.3% gain R
2. District 7, 2.19% gain
3. District 14, 8.3%
4. District 36, 3.4%
5. District 38, 9.7%

== List of races ==
=== District 1 ===
New Jersey general election, 1997
Party	Candidate	Votes	%	±%
Republican	John C. Gibson	32,699	27.6	▼1.6
Republican	Nicholas Asselta	32,032	27.0	▲1.3
Democratic	Jeff Van Drew	30,221	25.5	▲2.3
Democratic	Rob O'Donnell	21,278	17.9	▼3.9
Conservative	Rosemary Garrison	1,325	1.1	N/A
Conservative	Marie Pellecchia	1,127	0.9	N/A
Total votes		118,682	100.0	

=== District 2 ===
New Jersey general election, 1997
Party	Candidate	Votes	%	±%
Republican	Kenneth C. Le Fevre	33,430	32.2	▲3.7
Republican	Frank Blee	32,698	31.5	▲4.3
Democratic	John Di Maria	19,132	18.4	▼4.9
Democratic	E. Iris Hernandez	18,651	17.9	▼1.7
Total votes		103,911	100.0	

=== District 3 ===
New Jersey general election, 1997
Party	Candidate	Votes	%	±%
Republican	Jack Collins	39,046	36.3	▲5.3
Republican	Gary W. Stuhltrager	36,686	34.1	▲3.8
Democratic	Harry L. Rink	22,350	20.8	▲3.4
Conservative	Bob McFetridge	4,160	3.9	▲2.2
Conservative	Jan McFetridge	3,982	3.7	▲2.1
Democratic	No nomination made	1,376	1.3	▼16.7
Total votes		107,600	100.0	

=== District 4 ===
New Jersey general election, 1997
Party	Candidate	Votes	%	±%
Republican	George F. Geist	28,114	25.8	▲0.2
Republican	Gerald J. Luongo	26,535	24.3	▲3.4
Democratic	Anthony S. Marsella	25,310	23.2	▼2.6
Democratic	John "Jack" Luby	23,538	21.6	▼1.2
Conservative	J. Edw. Gormley	3,213	2.9	▲0.3
Conservative	Cynthia A. Merckx	2,394	2.2	0.0
Total votes		109,104	100.0	

=== District 5 ===
New Jersey general election, 1997
Party	Candidate	Votes	%	±%
Democratic	Joe Roberts	31,898	43.5	▲9.3
Democratic	Nilsa Cruz-Perez	28,918	39.4	▲7.9
Republican	Joe Smiriglio	11,744	16.0	▼1.6
Republican	No nomination made	777	1.1	▼15.5
Total votes		73,337	100.0	

=== District 6 ===
New Jersey general election, 1997
Party	Candidate	Votes	%	±%
Democratic	Louis D. Greenwald	35,883	29.0	▲2.7
Democratic	Mary T. Previte	34,105	27.6	▲3.2
Republican	Thomas Shusted, Jr.	27,236	22.0	▼2.9
Republican	Susan R. Rose	26,453	21.4	▼3.1
Total votes		123,677	100.0	

=== District 7 ===
New Jersey general election, 1997
Party	Candidate	Votes	%	±%
Democratic	Herbert C. Conaway, Jr.	27,447	24.63	▲3.2
Democratic	Jack Conners	27,402	24.59	▲3.4
Republican	Ken Faulkner	27,335	24.53	▼3.2
Republican	George Williams	25,122	22.5	▼3.0
Conservative	Hosey Best	1,257	1.1	N/A
Conservative	Raymond Hellings	1,091	1.0	N/A
Reform	Carmen S. Zarrelli	900	0.8	N/A
Reform	George Guzdek	880	0.8	▼0.7
Total votes		111,434	100.0	

=== District 8 ===
New Jersey general election, 1997
Party	Candidate	Votes	%	±%
Republican	Francis L. Bodine	35,865	28.8	▲2.9
Republican	Larry Chatzidakis	33,871	27.2	▲1.5
Democratic	James B. Smith	26,463	21.3	▼0.1
Democratic	Robert S. Shestack	25,947	20.8	▼0.3
Libertarian	Janice Presser, PhD.	2,385	1.9	▼0.7
Total votes		124,531	100.0	

=== District 9 ===
New Jersey general election, 1997
Party	Candidate	Votes	%	±%
Republican	Jeffrey W. Moran	47,232	31.9	▼0.5
Republican	Christopher J. Connors	47,205	31.9	▼0.8
Democratic	Sharon Fumei	25,398	17.1	▲2.5
Democratic	Michael G. Carrig	24,298	16.4	▲1.8
Conservative	James W. Eissing	2,015	1.4	▼1.4
Conservative	Nancy L. Eissing	2,009	1.4	▼1.5
Total votes		148,157	100.0	

=== District 10 ===
New Jersey general election, 1997
Party	Candidate	Votes	%	±%
Republican	David W. Wolfe	41,746	31.2	▲2.3
Republican	James W. Holzapfel	41,117	30.8	▲2.0
Democratic	Regina Calandrillo	23,538	17.6	▼0.9
Democratic	Jim Margetis	22,239	16.6	▼0.9
Libertarian	Betty Florentine	1,381	1.0	N/A
Libertarian	Christopher Kawa	1,317	1.0	N/A
Conservative	Edward C. Mueller	1,292	1.0	▼2.1
Conservative	J. Morgan Strong	1,068	0.8	▼2.3
Total votes		133,698	100.0	

=== District 11 ===
New Jersey general election, 1997
Party	Candidate	Votes	%	±%
Republican	Steve Corodemus	36,447	31.4	▲4.6
Republican	Tom Smith	36,379	31.4	▲4.8
Democratic	Matthew Donovan	21,673	18.7	▼2.1
Democratic	James Famularo	19,381	16.7	▼4.9
Conservative	Tom Holthausen	1,080	0.9	▼0.9
Conservative	Art Post	1,000	0.9	▼0.7
Total votes		115,960	100.0	

=== District 12 ===
New Jersey general election, 1997
Party	Candidate	Votes	%	±%
Republican	Michael J. Arnone	39,098	30.7	▼2.6
Republican	Clare M. Farragher	38,356	30.1	▼3.2
Democratic	Lillian E. Harris	23,018	18.1	▼4.9
Democratic	Gayle L. Hershcopf	22,073	17.3	N/A
Conservative	Frances H. Marshall	1,645	1.3	▼2.7
Conservative	Cornelius Van Sant	1,528	1.2	▼3.0
Natural Law	Christina M. Zegler	913	0.7	▼0.5
Natural Law	Joseph Parziale	867	0.7	▼0.4
Total votes		127,498	100.0	

=== District 13 ===
New Jersey general election, 1997
Party	Candidate	Votes	%	±%
Republican	Joe Azzolina	33,976	30.6	▲5.1
Republican	Sam Thompson	30,108	27.1	▲1.9
Democratic	Dennis M. Maher	22,162	20.0	▼3.1
Democratic	Nicholas Minutolo	21,712	19.6	▼1.8
Conservative	Leonard T. Skoblar	1,504	1.4	▼1.1
Conservative	Sylvia Kuzmak	1,456	1.3	▼1.0
Total votes		110,918	100.0	

=== District 14 ===
New Jersey general election, 1997
Party	Candidate	Votes	%	±%
Republican	Paul R. Kramer	34,996	26.2	▲1.0
Republican	Barbara W. Wright	34,725	26.0	▲1.8
Democratic	Janice S. Mironov	30,870	23.1	▲0.6
Democratic	Diana Segarra-Smith	30,534	22.8	▲1.5
Conservative	Bruce C. Macdonald	2,586	1.9	▼1.6
Total votes		133,711	100.0	

=== District 15 ===
New Jersey general election, 1997
Party	Candidate	Votes	%	±%
Democratic	Bonnie Watson Coleman	31,976	32.2	▲4.0
Democratic	Reed Gusciora	30,235	30.5	▲4.2
Republican	Wanda Webster Stansbury	19,639	19.8	▼1.1
Republican	Channell Wilkins	17,342	17.5	▼2.5
Total votes		99,192	100.0	

=== District 16 ===
New Jersey general election, 1997
Party	Candidate	Votes	%	±%
Republican	Christopher “Kip” Bateman	43,458	31.8	▲3.1
Republican	Peter J. Biondi	41,008	30.0	▲1.4
Democratic	Amedeo D’Adamo, Jr.	23,920	17.5	▼1.3
Democratic	Harold Weber	22,921	16.8	▼0.6
Conservative	Robert Kowal	2,758	2.0	▼1.4
Conservative	Howard Manella	2,432	1.8	▼1.3
Total votes		136,497	100.0	

=== District 17 ===
New Jersey general election, 1997
Party	Candidate	Votes	%	±%
Democratic	Bob Smith	27,802	34.5	▲0.9
Democratic	Jerry Green	26,135	32.4	▼0.3
Republican	Phyllis A. Mason	13,310	16.5	▲2.0
Republican	Daniel N. Epstein	11,803	14.6	▲0.7
Conservative	Pat M. Iurilli	802	1.0	▼1.8
Conservative	Joy Norsworthy	778	1.0	▼1.4
Total votes		80,630	100.0	

=== District 18 ===
New Jersey general election, 1997
Party	Candidate	Votes	%	±%
Democratic	Barbara Buono	33,248	28.6	▲2.0
Democratic	Peter J. Barnes, Jr.	31,781	27.3	▲2.0
Republican	Wendy L. Wiebalk	25,729	22.1	▼1.2
Republican	Thomas J. Toto	25,612	22.0	▲0.2
Total votes		116,370	100.0	

=== District 19 ===
New Jersey general election, 1997
Party	Candidate	Votes	%	±%
Democratic	John S. Wisniewski	36,099	34.4	▲5.5
Democratic	Arline M. Friscia	34,006	32.4	▲5.1
Republican	Kennedy O’Brien	17,605	16.8	▼4.3
Republican	Debbie Bialowarczuk	17,356	16.5	▼2.3
Total votes		105,066	100.0	

=== District 20 ===
New Jersey general election, 1997
Party	Candidate	Votes	%	±%
Democratic	Joseph S. Suliga	26,348	35.0	▲0.5
Democratic	Neil M. Cohen	26,242	34.8	0.0
Republican	Daniel B. Levine	11,380	15.1	▲1.7
Republican	Richard A. Revilla	11,366	15.1	▲1.7
Total votes		75,336	100.0	

=== District 21 ===
New Jersey general election, 1997
Party	Candidate	Votes	%	±%
Republican	Kevin O’Toole	38,169	31.3	▲2.7
Republican	Joel M. Weingarten	37,915	31.1	▲2.5
Democratic	John M. Mazziotti	22,292	18.3	▼3.4
Democratic	John C. Shaw	21,511	17.6	▼2.0
Conservative	Alfonso J. Adinolfi	1,207	1.0	N/A
Conservative	Thomas J. Mooney	883	0.7	N/A
Total votes		121,977	100.0	

=== District 22 ===
New Jersey general election, 1997
Party	Candidate	Votes	%	±%
Republican	Richard H. Bagger	43,421	32.5	▲3.3
Republican	Alan M. Augustine	42,479	31.8	▲3.3
Democratic	Andrew Baron	22,368	16.7	▼2.5
Democratic	Norman Albert	22,110	16.5	▼2.6
Conservative	Douglas Lawless	1,688	1.3	▼0.8
Conservative	Norman A. Ross	1,635	1.2	▼0.8
Total votes		133,701	100.0	

=== District 23 ===
New Jersey general election, 1997
Party	Candidate	Votes	%	±%
Republican	Leonard Lance	41,880	32.7	▼0.8
Republican	Connie Myers	37,852	29.6	▼0.1
Democratic	Sharon B. Ransavage	25,237	19.7	▼2.6
Democratic	John Patrick Barnes	19,798	15.5	N/A
Conservative	Paul Wallace	3,242	2.5	▼3.8
Total votes		128,009	100.0	

=== District 24 ===
New Jersey general election, 1997
Party	Candidate	Votes	%	±%
Republican	E. Scott Garrett	43,066	39.7	▲3.1
Republican	Guy R. Gregg	40,170	37.1	▲1.4
Democratic	Frederick J. Katz, Jr.	14,878	13.7	▼2.0
Conservative	Marilyn McCann	4,015	3.7	▼3.7
Libertarian	Jeffrey Polachek	3,654	3.4	N/A
Conservative	Ed De Mott	2,622	2.4	▼2.3
Total votes		108,405	100.0	

=== District 25 ===
New Jersey general election, 1997
Party	Candidate	Votes	%	±%
Republican	Michael Patrick Carroll	37,935	31.8	▲3.2
Republican	Rick Merkt	36,649	30.7	▼0.1
Democratic	Chris Evangel	20,968	17.6	▼0.7
Democratic	Harriet Lerner	20,967	17.6	▼0.5
Conservative	James Spinosa	1,630	1.4	▼0.7
Conservative	Stephen Spinosa	1,296	1.1	▼1.0
Total votes		119,445	100.0	

=== District 26 ===
New Jersey general election, 1997
Party	Candidate	Votes	%	±%
Republican	Carol J. Murphy	41,044	34.6	▲1.0
Republican	Alex DeCroce	40,469	34.1	▲0.6
Democratic	Daniel L. Grant	16,891	14.2	▼1.3
Democratic	Michael B. McGlynn	16,787	14.1	▼1.1
Conservative	Stephen A. Bauer	1,793	1.5	▼0.6
Conservative	Martin J. McGrath	1,729	1.5	N/A
Total votes		118,713	100.0	

=== District 27 ===
New Jersey general election, 1997
Party	Candidate	Votes	%	±%
Democratic	LeRoy J. Jones, Jr.	34,377	49.0	▲14.5
Democratic	Nia H. Gill	34,176	48.7	▲13.1
Socialist	John Winter	1,051	1.5	▲0.4
Natural Law	Jeffrey M. Levine	601	0.9	N/A
Total votes		70,205	100.0	

=== District 28 ===
New Jersey general election, 1997
Party	Candidate	Votes	%	±%
Democratic	Wilfredo Caraballo	28,673	40.1	▲5.0
Democratic	Craig A. Stanley	28,261	39.6	▲5.5
Republican	Mary Devon O’Brien	7,754	10.9	▼1.1
Republican	Eugene Brenycz	6,044	8.5	▼3.6
Conservative	Barbara M. Hester	368	0.5	▼1.0
Conservative	Richard S. Hester, Sr.	335	0.5	▼0.7 (▼1.3)
Total votes		71,435	100.0	

=== District 29 ===
New Jersey general election, 1997
Party	Candidate	Votes	%	±%
Democratic	William D. Payne	27,250	42.8	▲4.2
Democratic	Donald Tucker	27,188	42.7	▲8.8
Republican	Efrain Colon, Jr.	4,113	6.5	▼3.4
Republican	Rita MacGonigle	3,873	6.1	▼3.7
Independent	D. Kim Thompson-Gaddy	615	1.0	N/A
Independent	Tharien Arnold	334	0.5	N/A
Socialist Workers	Megan Arney	206	0.3	▼3.9
Socialist Workers	Brock Satter	156	0.2	▼3.5
Total votes		63,735	100.0	

=== District 30 ===
New Jersey general election, 1997
Party	Candidate	Votes	%	±%
Republican	Joseph R. Malone, III	28,550	28.6	▼5.0
Republican	Melvin Cottrell	28,236	28.3	▼3.5
Democratic	Arthur F. Conway	20,375	20.4	▲0.4
Democratic	Richard Borys	18,673	18.7	N/A
Conservative	Stephen Mognancki	2,028	2.0	▼4.7
Conservative	Sal Duscio	1,961	2.0	▼2.4
Total votes		99,823	100.0	

=== District 31 ===
New Jersey general election, 1997
Party	Candidate	Votes	%	±%
Democratic	Joseph V. Doria, Jr.	31,129	39.6	▲1.1
Democratic	Joseph Charles, Jr.	30,479	38.8	▲0.4
Republican	David J. Longenhagen	8,561	10.9	▲0.6
Republican	Mofalc Olei Meinga	8,415	10.7	▲0.5
Total votes		78,584	100.0	

=== District 32 ===
New Jersey general election, 1997
Party	Candidate	Votes	%	±%
Democratic	Anthony Impreveduto	28,834	33.6	▼1.0
Democratic	Joan Quigley	28,519	33.3	0.0
Republican	Michael Padovano	12,965	15.1	▲0.6
Republican	Kevin Canessa, Jr.	12,201	14.2	▲0.1
Politicians Are Crooks	Frank X. Landrigan	1,434	1.7	▲0.7
Conservative	Yvonne Battaglia	634	0.7	▼0.1
Conservative	Charles W. Joyce	500	0.6	▼0.2
Natural Law	Barbara Ebel	425	0.5	N/A
Natural Law	Kenneth Ebel	224	0.3	N/A
Total votes		85,736	100.0	

=== District 33 ===
New Jersey general election, 1997
Party	Candidate	Votes	%	±%
Democratic	Raul “Rudy” Garcia	28,335	36.9	▼3.0
Democratic	Louis A. Romano	27,440	35.7	▼2.8
Republican	Micaela M. Alvarez	10,608	13.8	▲3.5
Republican	Freddy Gomez	10,447	13.6	▲3.3
Total votes		76,830	100.0	

=== District 34 ===
New Jersey general election, 1997
Party	Candidate	Votes	%	±%
Republican	Gerald H. Zecker	32,584	28.7	▲1.7
Republican	Marion Crecco	31,125	27.5	▲2.0
Democratic	Joseph A. Mecca	26,507	23.4	▼1.1
Democratic	J. Martin Comey	22,454	19.8	▲0.4
Conservative	Joe Bukowski	710	0.6	▼1.7
Total votes		113,380	100.0	

=== District 35 ===
New Jersey general election, 1997
Party	Candidate	Votes	%	±%
Democratic	Alfred Steele	23,253	31.2	▲4.6
Democratic	Nellie Pou	22,112	29.6	▼3.7
Republican	Karole A. Graves	14,785	19.8	▼1.8
Republican	Frank Catania, Jr.	14,465	19.4	▲0.9
Total votes		74,615	100.0	

=== District 36 ===
New Jersey general election, 1997
Party	Candidate	Votes	%	±%
Republican	John V. Kelly	24,140	25.9	▼1.0
Republican	Paul DiGaetano	24,037	25.8	▼1.9
Democratic	David Sivella	23,009	24.7	▲4.1
Democratic	Kenneth M. Sorkin	21,992	23.6	▲3.4
Total votes		93,178	100.0	

=== District 37 ===
New Jersey general election, 1997
Party	Candidate	Votes	%	±%
Democratic	Loretta Weinberg	33,677	33.0	▲2.3
Democratic	Ken Zisa	31,961	31.3	▲3.8
Republican	Bette O’Keefe	17,633	17.3	▼2.3
Republican	John Abraham	17,045	16.7	▼2.5
Conservative	BettyJean Downing	975	1.0	▼0.5
Conservative	Gregory A. Potter	803	0.8	▼0.8
Total votes		102,094	100.0	

=== District 38 ===
New Jersey general election, 1997
Party	Candidate	Votes	%	±%
Republican	Rose Marie Heck	29,987	28.0	▲1.6
Republican	Guy F. Talarico	28,157	26.3	▼1.9
Democratic	Michael Paul De Marse	23,956	22.4	▲1.1
Democratic	Fred Dressel	23,738	22.2	▲1.6
Conservative	Bernard C. Sobolewski	1,259	1.2	▼0.5
Total votes		107,097	100.0	

=== District 39 ===
New Jersey general election, 1997
Party	Candidate	Votes	%	±%
Republican	Charlotte Vandervalk	44,522	32.8	▲2.2
Republican	John E. Rooney	43,203	31.9	▲2.6
Democratic	Sherri Lippman	22,847	16.9	▼2.7
Democratic	Eric S. Aronson	22,446	16.6	▼2.1
Conservative	Pasquale Salimone	951	0.7	0.0
Conservative	Cynthia Soroka	926	0.7	0.0
Libertarian	Thomas Fischetti	666	0.5	N/A
Total votes		135,561	100.0	

=== District 40 ===
New Jersey general election, 1997
Party	Candidate	Votes	%	±%
Republican	Nicholas R. Felice	42,207	33.7	0.0
Republican	David C. Russo	41,261	33.0	▲1.1
Democratic	Dawn Savarese	20,013	16.0	▼1.2
Democratic	Peter Goetz	19,680	15.7	▲0.6
Conservative	Mike Best	1,088	0.9	▼1.2
Conservative	Walter Renninghoff	961	0.8	N/A
Total votes		125,210	100.0	

== See also ==
- 1997 New Jersey Senate election
