= 1989 New Jersey General Assembly election =

- November 7, 1989

All 80 seats in the New Jersey General Assembly 41 seats needed for a majority
- Turnout: 60% (▲13pp)
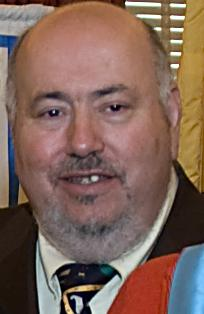

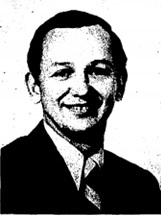
	Majority party	Minority party
Leader	Joe Doria	Chuck Hardwick (stepped down)
Party	Democratic	Republican
Leader since	January 12, 1988	January 3, 1985
Leader's seat	31st (Bayonne)	21st (Westfield)
Last election	38	42
Seats before	39	41
Seats won	44	36
Seat change	▲5	▼5
- Results: Democratic gain Democratic hold Republican hold
Speaker before election
Chuck Hardwick
Republican
Elected Speaker
Joe Doria
Democratic

The 1989 New Jersey General Assembly election was held on November 7, 1989.

The elections coincided with Jim Florio's landslide election as Governor of New Jersey. As a result, Democrats won back the Assembly for the first time since 1983. Democrats flipped one seat in districts 2, 10, 11, 21, and 34.

== Incumbents not running for re-election ==
=== Democratic ===
- Dennis L. Riley (District 4) (lost party support)
- Alan Karcher (District 19) (ran for Governor)

=== Republican ===
- John T. Hendrickson Jr. (District 9) (resigned September 1)
- Joseph A. Palaia (District 11) (ran for State Senate)
- Peter J. Genova (District 21) (stepped aside after running mate lost gubernatorial primary)

== Summary of races ==
Voters in each legislative district elect two members to the New Jersey General Assembly.

District	Incumbent	Party	Elected	Party
1st Legislative District	Frank LoBiondo	Rep	Frank LoBiondo	Rep
1st Legislative District	Edward H. Salmon	Dem	Edward H. Salmon	Dem
2nd Legislative District	J. Edward Kline	Rep	Fred Scerni	Dem
2nd Legislative District	Dolores G. Cooper	Rep	Dolores G. Cooper	Rep
3rd Legislative District	Jack Collins	Rep	Jack Collins	Rep
3rd Legislative District	Gary Stuhltrager	Rep	Gary Stuhltrager	Rep
4th Legislative District	Anthony S. Marsella	Dem	Anthony S. Marsella	Dem
4th Legislative District	Dennis L. Riley	Dem	Ann A. Mullen	Dem
5th Legislative District	Joseph J. Roberts (Note: Roberts won a July 1989 special election to complete the unexpired term of Assemblyman Francis J. Gorman, who resigned due to poor health.)	Dem	Joseph J. Roberts	Dem
5th Legislative District	Wayne R. Bryant	Dem	Wayne R. Bryant	Dem
6th Legislative District	John A. Rocco	Rep	John A. Rocco	Rep
6th Legislative District	Thomas J. Shusted	Rep	Thomas J. Shusted	Rep
7th Legislative District	Barbara Kalik	Dem	Barbara Kalik	Dem
7th Legislative District	Thomas P. Foy	Dem	Thomas P. Foy	Dem
8th Legislative District	Harold L. Colburn Jr.	Rep	Harold L. Colburn Jr.	Rep
8th Legislative District	Robert C. Shinn Jr.	Rep	Robert C. Shinn Jr.	Rep
9th Legislative District	Vacant (Note: Incumbent Assemblyman John T. Hendrickson, who was not seeking re-election, resigned on September 1.)		Christopher Connors	Rep
9th Legislative District	Jeffrey Moran	Rep	Jeffrey Moran	Rep
10th Legislative District	John Paul Doyle	Dem	John Paul Doyle	Dem
10th Legislative District	Robert Singer	Rep	Marlene Lynch Ford	Dem
11th Legislative District	Joseph A. Palaia	Rep	Daniel P. Jacobson	Dem
11th Legislative District	John Villapiano	Dem	John Villapiano	Dem
12th Legislative District	Clare Farragher	Rep	Clare Farragher	Rep
12th Legislative District	Michael Arnone	Rep	Michael Arnone	Rep
13th Legislative District	Joe Kyrillos	Rep	Joe Kyrillos	Rep
13th Legislative District	Joann H. Smith	Rep	Joann H. Smith	Rep
14th Legislative District	Joseph D. Patero	Dem	Joseph D. Patero	Dem
14th Legislative District	Anthony Cimino	Dem	Anthony Cimino	Dem
15th Legislative District	John S. Watson	Dem	John S. Watson	Dem
15th Legislative District	Gerald S. Naples	Dem	Gerald S. Naples	Dem
16th Legislative District	Walter J. Kavanaugh	Rep	Walter J. Kavanaugh	Rep
16th Legislative District	John S. Penn	Rep	John S. Penn	Rep
17th Legislative District	David C. Schwartz	Dem	David C. Schwartz	Dem
17th Legislative District	Bob Smith	Dem	Bob Smith	Dem
18th Legislative District	George A. Spadoro	Dem	George A. Spadoro	Dem
18th Legislative District	Frank M. Pelly	Dem	Frank M. Pelly	Dem
19th Legislative District	George Otlowski	Dem	George Otlowski	Dem
19th Legislative District	Alan Karcher	Dem	Jim McGreevey	Dem
20th Legislative District	Thomas J. Deverin	Dem	Thomas J. Deverin	Dem
20th Legislative District	George Hudak	Dem	George Hudak	Dem
21st Legislative District	Chuck Hardwick	Rep	Chuck Hardwick	Rep
21st Legislative District	Peter J. Genova	Rep	Neil M. Cohen	Dem
22nd Legislative District	Bob Franks	Rep	Bob Franks	Rep
22nd Legislative District	Maureen Ogden	Rep	Maureen Ogden	Rep
23rd Legislative District	Bill Schluter (Note: Schluter won a July 1989 special election to complete the unexpired term of Assemblyman Dick Zimmer, who was elected to the State Senate.)	Rep	Bill Schluter	Rep
23rd Legislative District	Dick Kamin (Note: Kamin won an August 1986 special election to complete the unexpired term of Assemblyman Karl Weidel, who resigned to join the Department of Insurance.)	Rep	Dick Kamin	Rep
24th Legislative District	Robert E. Littell	Rep	Robert E. Littell	Rep
24th Legislative District	Chuck Haytaian	Rep	Chuck Haytaian	Rep
25th Legislative District	Rodney Frelinghuysen	Rep	Rodney Frelinghuysen	Rep
25th Legislative District	Arthur R. Albohn	Rep	Arthur R. Albohn	Rep
26th Legislative District	Robert J. Martin	Rep	Robert J. Martin	Rep
26th Legislative District	Alex DeCroce (Note: DeCroce was appointed to complete the unexpired term of Assemblyman Ralph A. Loveys, who resigned to head the New Jersey Turnpike Authority.)	Rep	Alex DeCroce	Rep
27th Legislative District	Harry A. McEnroe	Dem	Harry A. McEnroe	Dem
27th Legislative District	Mildred Barry Garvin	Dem	Stephanie R. Bush	Dem
28th Legislative District	Michael Adubato	Dem	Michael Adubato	Dem
28th Legislative District	James Zangari	Dem	James Zangari	Dem
29th Legislative District	Willie B. Brown	Dem	Willie B. Brown	Dem
29th Legislative District	Eugene H. Thompson	Dem	Jackie Mattison	Dem
30th Legislative District	John V. Kelly	Rep	John V. Kelly	Rep
30th Legislative District	Marion Crecco	Rep	Marion Crecco	Rep
31st Legislative District	Joe Doria	Dem	Joe Doria	Dem
31st Legislative District	Joseph Charles	Dem	Joseph Charles	Dem
32nd Legislative District	Anthony Impreveduto	Dem	Anthony Impreveduto	Dem
32nd Legislative District	David C. Kronick	Dem	David C. Kronick	Dem
33rd Legislative District	Bernard Kenny	Dem	Bernard Kenny	Dem
33rd Legislative District	Bob Menendez	Dem	Bob Menendez	Dem
34th Legislative District	Gerald Zecker	Rep	Gerald Zecker	Rep
34th Legislative District	Newton E. Miller	Rep	Joseph Mecca	Dem
35th Legislative District	John Girgenti	Dem	John Girgenti	Dem
35th Legislative District	Bill Pascrell	Dem	Bill Pascrell	Dem
36th Legislative District	Louis J. Gill	Dem	Louis J. Gill	Dem
36th Legislative District	Thomas J. Duch	Dem	Thomas J. Duch	Dem
37th Legislative District	D. Bennett Mazur	Dem	D. Bennett Mazur	Dem
37th Legislative District	Byron Baer	Dem	Byron Baer	Dem
38th Legislative District	Pat Schuber	Rep	Pat Schuber	Rep
38th Legislative District	Patrick J. Roma	Rep	Patrick J. Roma	Rep
39th Legislative District	John E. Rooney	Rep	John E. Rooney	Rep
39th Legislative District	Elizabeth Randall	Rep	Elizabeth Randall	Rep
40th Legislative District	Walter M. D. Kern	Rep	David C. Russo	Rep
40th Legislative District	Nicholas Felice	Rep	Nicholas Felice	Rep

=== Close races ===
Districts where the difference of total votes between the top-two parties was under 10%:

1. District 6, 1.16%
2. District 21, 1.2% gain D
3. District 2, 2.0% gain D
4. District 9, 2.6%
5. District 34, 3.0% gain D
6. District 12, 4.2%
7. District 30, 5.4%
8. District 19, 6.0%
9. District 1, 6.4%
10. District 38, 7.6%
11. District 3, 8.4%
12. District 13, 8.6%

== District 1 ==
=== General election ===
New Jersey general election, 1989
Party	Candidate	Votes	%	±%
Democratic	Edward H. Salmon	35,715	28.4	▲2.5
Republican	Frank A. LoBiondo	32,600	25.9	▼1.0
Democratic	Raymond A. Batten	31,193	24.8	▲1.2
Republican	Martin L. Pagliughi	26,440	21.0	▼2.6
Total votes		'125,948'	'100.0'	

== District 2 ==
=== General election ===
New Jersey general election, 1989
Party	Candidate	Votes	%	±%
Republican	Dolores G. Cooper	27,736	26.1	▼6.4
Democratic	Fred Scerni	26,833	25.2	▲6.2
Republican	J. Edward Kline	26,443	24.9	▼8.4
Democratic	Mary Ellen Starn	25,351	23.8	▲8.6
Total votes		'106,363'	'100.0'	

== District 3 ==
=== General election ===
New Jersey general election, 1989
Party	Candidate	Votes	%	±%
Republican	Jack Collins	33,680	28.0	▲1.3
Republican	Gary W. Stuhltrager	31,526	26.2	▼0.9
Democratic	Thomas A. Pankok	27,165	22.6	▼0.5
Democratic	Robert P. Wooton	26,351	21.9	▼1.2
Independent	James H. Orr, Jr.	1,680	1.4	N/A
Total votes		'120,402'	'100.0'	

== District 4 ==
=== General election ===
New Jersey general election, 1989
Party	Candidate	Votes	%	±%
Democratic	Anthony S. Marsella	36,248	32.2	▲4.4
Democratic	Ann A. Mullen	34,967	31.0	▲3.6
Republican	Phil Donohue	21,486	19.1	▼3.4
Republican	Frank J. Reed III	19,916	17.7	▼4.6
Total votes		'112,617'	'100.0'	

== District 5 ==
=== General election ===
New Jersey general election, 1989
Party	Candidate	Votes	%	±%
Democratic	Wayne R. Bryant	32,479	37.1	▲2.2
Democratic	Joe Roberts	31,906	36.5	▲2.3
Republican	Jay L. Scott	11,779	13.5	▼1.5
Republican	Raymond R. Groller	11,281	12.9	▼3.0
Total votes		'87,445'	'100.0'	

== District 6 ==
=== General election ===
New Jersey general election, 1989
Party	Candidate	Votes	%	±%
Republican	John A. Rocco	33,528	25.7	▼3.3
Republican	Thomas J. Shusted	32,459	24.88	▼3.1
Democratic	Barbara Berman	32,425	24.86	▲2.9
Democratic	Mary Ellen Talbott	32,039	24.6	▲3.6
Total votes		'130,451'	'100.0'	

== District 7 ==
=== General election ===
New Jersey general election, 1989
Party	Candidate	Votes	%	±%
Democratic	Barbara Faith Kalik	34,280	32.4	▲2.2
Democratic	Thomas P. Foy	34,196	32.3	▲3.1
Republican	Renee L. Borstad	18,709	17.7	▼2.3
Republican	Vincent R. Farias	18,570	17.6	▼2.9
Total votes		'105,755'	'100.0'	

== District 8 ==
=== General election ===
New Jersey general election, 1989
Party	Candidate	Votes	%	±%
Republican	Harold L. Colburn	34,090	28.9	▼4.6
Republican	Robert C. Shinn, Jr.	34,007	28.8	▼4.3
Democratic	Jerome A. Sweeney	25,199	21.4	▲4.4
Democratic	Sanford Schneider	24,657	20.9	▲4.5
Total votes		'117,953'	'100.0'	

== District 9 ==
=== General election ===
New Jersey general election, 1989
Party	Candidate	Votes	%	±%
Republican	Christopher J. Connors	38,013	25.8	▼5.9
Republican	Jeffrey W. Moran	37,604	25.5	▼5.2
Democratic	Lawrence J. Williams	35,933	24.4	▲5.3
Democratic	Joseph Meglino	35,753	24.3	▲5.7
Total votes		'147,303'	'100.0'	

== District 10 ==
=== General election ===
New Jersey general election, 1989
Party	Candidate	Votes	%	±%
Democratic	John Paul Doyle	39,049	28.2	▲0.9
Democratic	Marlene Lynch Ford	36,706	26.5	▲1.1
Republican	Robert W. Singer	33,139	24.0	▼2.0
Republican	John A. Peterson, Jr.	29,460	21.3	0.0
Total votes		'138,354'	'100.0'	

== District 11 ==
=== General election ===
New Jersey general election, 1989
Party	Candidate	Votes	%	±%
Democratic	John A. Villapiano	36,655	30.6	▲9.1
Democratic	Daniel P. Jacobson	30,282	25.2	▲4.9
Republican	Paul A. Kapalko	28,100	23.4	▼4.7
Republican	Dennis G. Sternberg	24,928	20.8	▼7.0
Total votes		'119,965'	'100.0'	

== District 12 ==
=== General election ===
New Jersey general election, 1989
Party	Candidate	Votes	%	±%
Republican	Clare M. Farragher	34,169	26.3	▼3.5
Republican	Michael J. Arnone	33,506	25.8	▼5.9
Democratic	Lynn Reich	31,515	24.2	▲4.8
Democratic	Frank G. Abate	30,842	23.7	▲4.6
Total votes		'130,032'	'100.0'	

== District 13 ==
=== General election ===
New Jersey general election, 1989
Party	Candidate	Votes	%	±%
Republican	Joseph M. Kyrillos, Jr.	31,934	27.9	▲1.9
Republican	Joann H. Smith	30,259	26.4	▼0.2
Democratic	Richard A. Cooper	26,391	23.0	▼0.7
Democratic	Irvin B. Beaver	25,700	22.4	▼1.3
Libertarian	Claudia Montelione	345	0.3	N/A
Total votes		'114,629'	'100.0'	

== District 14 ==
=== General election ===
New Jersey general election, 1989
Party	Candidate	Votes	%	±%
Democratic	Anthony J. “Skip” Cimino	40,784	32.7	▲2.3
Democratic	Joseph D. Patero	39,299	31.5	▲1.4
Republican	Frank V. Ragazzo	23,620	18.9	▼1.1
Republican	Calvin O. Iszard, Jr.	21,118	16.9	▼2.6
Total votes		'124,821'	'100.0'	

== District 15 ==
=== General election ===
New Jersey general election, 1989
Party	Candidate	Votes	%	±%
Democratic	Gerard S. Naples	32,966	33.9	▲0.7
Democratic	John S. Watson	32,398	33.3	▲0.7
Republican	Sharon H. Rousseau	16,005	16.5	▼1.0
Republican	June C. Morreale	15,802	16.3	▼0.4
Total votes		'97,171'	'100.0'	

== District 16 ==
=== General election ===
New Jersey general election, 1989
Party	Candidate	Votes	%	±%
Republican	Walter J. Kavanaugh	39,268	32.5	▼3.3
Republican	John S. Penn	37,092	30.7	▼2.8
Democratic	Nicholas F. Cappuccino	22,651	18.7	▲3.2
Democratic	Alfred A. Wicklund	21,799	18.0	▲2.8
Total votes		'120,810'	'100.0'	

== District 17 ==
=== General election ===
New Jersey general election, 1989
Party	Candidate	Votes	%	±%
Democratic	Bob Smith	26,999	33.6	▲2.4
Democratic	David C. Schwartz	26,720	33.3	▲1.4
Republican	George B. Gore	13,155	16.4	▼2.2
Republican	Csilla Soproni	12,270	15.3	▼2.9
Time For Change	Joseph F. Scalera III	1,210	1.5	N/A
Total votes		'80,354'	'100.0'	

== District 18 ==
=== General election ===
New Jersey general election, 1989
Party	Candidate	Votes	%	±%
Democratic	Frank M. Pelly	39,017	30.3	▲0.1
Democratic	George A. Spadoro	38,443	29.9	▲1.1
Republican	Cheryl Ann Rickards	25,933	20.2	▼0.8
Republican	Charles Eibeler	25,181	19.6	▼0.3
Total votes		128,574	100.0	

== District 19 ==
=== General election ===
New Jersey general election, 1989
Party	Candidate	Votes	%	±%
Democratic	James E. McGreevey	27,726	27.7	▲1.1
Democratic	George J. Otlowski	25,298	25.3	▼2.0
Republican	Randy Corman	23,941	24.0	▲1.4
Republican	Emery Z. Toth	22,957	23.0	▼0.5
Total votes		'99,922'	'100.0'	

== District 20 ==
=== General election ===
New Jersey general election, 1989
Party	Candidate	Votes	%	±%
Democratic	George Hudak	27,871	35.8	▼1.4
Democratic	Thomas J. Deverin	27,848	35.8	▼2.0
Republican	Thomas C. Cusmano	10,653	13.7	▲1.2
Republican	Jeffrey B. Cohen	10,469	13.5	▲1.0
Populist	Kevin F. Brown	973	1.3	N/A
Total votes		'77,814'	'100.0'	

== District 21 ==
=== General election ===
New Jersey general election, 1989
Party	Candidate	Votes	%	±%
Republican	Chuck Hardwick	30,795	26.3	▼4.0
Democratic	Neil M. Cohen	30,622	26.2	▲7.1
Democratic	Brian W. Fahey	28,608	24.4	▲1.8
Republican	Ronald J. Frigerio	27,035	23.1	▼4.9
Total votes		'117,060'	'100.0'	

== District 22 ==
=== General election ===
New Jersey general election, 1989
Party	Candidate	Votes	%	±%
Republican	Maureen Ogden	37,703	31.3	▼10.2
Republican	Bob Franks	35,792	29.7	▼9.3
Democratic	Peter J. DeCicco	24,007	19.9	▲0.5
Democratic	William A. Carrollton	23,021	19.1	N/A
Total votes		'120,523'	'100.0'	

== District 23 ==
=== General election ===
New Jersey general election, 1989
Party	Candidate	Votes	%	±%
Republican	Bill Schluter	38,345	40.3	▲4.0
Republican	Dick Kamin	36,853	38.7	▲3.2
Democratic	Jane L. Weller	20,032	21.0	▲6.6
Total votes		'95,230'	'100.0'	

== District 24 ==
=== General election ===
New Jersey general election, 1989
Party	Candidate	Votes	%	±%
Republican	Robert E. Littell	35,117	33.4	▼1.5
Republican	Garabed “Chuck” Haytaian	34,579	32.9	▼2.9
Democratic	Timothy P. McCabe	15,301	14.5	▲0.3
Democratic	Robert T. Davis	13,585	12.9	▼2.1
Reduce Insurance Rates	Frederick P. Cook	6,660	6.3	N/A
Total votes		'105,242'	'100.0'	

== District 25 ==
=== General election ===
New Jersey general election, 1989
Party	Candidate	Votes	%	±%
Republican	Rodney P. Frelinghuysen	33,658	32.8	▼10.3
Republican	Arthur R. Albohn	29,645	28.9	▼7.5
Democratic	Kathleen Daley	21,029	20.5	N/A
Democratic	George Stafford	18,290	17.8	▼2.7
Total votes		102,622	100.0	

== District 26 ==
=== General election ===
New Jersey general election, 1989
Party	Candidate	Votes	%	±%
Republican	Robert J. Martin	32,631	32.2	▼2.2
Republican	Alex DeCroce	32,583	32.2	▼1.6
Democratic	Carlton W. Hansen, Jr.	18,094	17.9	▲1.5
Democratic	Fred Liebhauser	17,969	17.7	▲2.3
Total votes		'101,277'	'100.0'	

== District 27 ==
=== General election ===
New Jersey general election, 1989
Party	Candidate	Votes	%	±%
Democratic	Stephanie R. Bush	26,536	37.1	▲0.9
Democratic	Harry A. McEnroe	26,512	37.0	▼0.5
Republican	Anthony Benevento	10,531	14.7	▲1.0
Republican	Michael Webb	8,035	11.2	▼1.4
Total votes		'71,614'	'100.0'	

== District 28 ==
=== General election ===
New Jersey general election, 1989
Party	Candidate	Votes	%	±%
Democratic	Michael F. Adubato	17,518	41.5	▲4.7
Democratic	James Zangari	16,895	40.0	▲4.4
Republican	Michael J. Grier	3,859	9.1	▼1.6
Republican	Michael Volk	3,699	8.8	▼1.1
Socialist Workers	Ernest M. Mailhot	281	0.7	N/A
Total votes		'42,252'	'100.0'	

== District 29 ==
=== General election ===
New Jersey general election, 1989
Party	Candidate	Votes	%	±%
Democratic	Willie B. Brown	16,786	44.5	▲1.5
Democratic	Jackie R. Mattison	15,440	40.9	▲1.5
Republican	Kurt A. Culbreath	2,447	6.5	▼1.3
Republican	David Blount	2,314	6.1	▼3.7
Independent Conservative Radical	Harold J. Young	749	2.0	N/A
Total votes		'37,736'	'100.0'	

== District 30 ==
=== General election ===
New Jersey general election, 1989
Party	Candidate	Votes	%	±%
Republican	Marion Crecco	28,990	26.5	▼6.3
Republican	John V. Kelly	28,690	26.2	▼7.7
Democratic	Buddy Fortunato	28,050	25.6	▲8.4
Democratic	Ann C. Mega	23,787	21.7	▲5.5
Total votes		'109,517'	'100.0'	

== District 31 ==
=== General election ===
New Jersey general election, 1989
Party	Candidate	Votes	%	±%
Democratic	Joseph V. Doria, Jr.	33,196	41.2	▲2.7
Democratic	Joseph Charles, Jr.	32,384	40.2	▲1.4
Republican	James J. Richardson	7,499	9.3	▼2.9
Republican	Theresa Lukachyk	7,413	9.2	▼1.2
Total votes		80,492	100.0	

== District 32 ==
=== General election ===
New Jersey general election, 1989
Party	Candidate	Votes	%	±%
Democratic	Anthony Impreveduto	30,047	35.6	▲3.4
Democratic	David C. Kronick	28,494	33.7	▲3.8
Republican	Guy Catrillo	12,418	14.7	▼5.3
Republican	Octavio J. Alfonso	11,975	14.2	▼2.7
Car Insurance Stinks	Herbert H. Shaw	1,541	1.8	▲1.3
Total votes		'84,475'	'100.0'	

== District 33 ==
=== General election ===
New Jersey general election, 1989
Party	Candidate	Votes	%	±%
Democratic	Bernard F. Kenny, Jr.	24,294	34.4	▲4.8
Democratic	Robert Menendez	23,767	33.7	▲4.7
Republican	Ann Clark	11,738	16.6	▼3.6
Republican	Antonio Miguelez	10,800	15.3	▼4.6
Total votes		'70,599'	'100.0'	

== District 34 ==
=== General election ===
New Jersey general election, 1989
Party	Candidate	Votes	%	±%
Democratic	Joseph A. Mecca	28,564	26.1	▲2.9
Republican	Gerald H. Zecker	28,003	25.6	▼2.0
Republican	Newton Miller	26,782	24.5	▼2.5
Democratic	Robert J. Baran	24,534	22.4	▲0.3
Auto Insurance Reform	Edward Schumacher	1,505	1.4	N/A
Total votes		'109,388'	'100.0'	

== District 35 ==
=== General election ===
New Jersey general election, 1989
Party	Candidate	Votes	%	±%
Democratic	John A. Girgenti	24,359	37.0	▲1.4
Democratic	William J. Pascrell, Jr.	23,633	35.9	▲1.6
Republican	Joaquin Calcines, Jr.	9,093	13.8	▼2.8
Republican	Jose L. Moore	8,707	13.2	▼0.3
Total votes		'65,792'	'100.0'	

== District 36 ==
=== General election ===
New Jersey general election, 1989
Party	Candidate	Votes	%	±%
Democratic	Louis J. Gill	26,871	28.1	▲0.4
Democratic	Thomas J. Duch	26,853	28.1	▲1.0
Republican	Paul Di Gaetano	22,105	23.1	▼0.4
Republican	William Kogut	19,764	20.7	▼1.0
Total votes		'95,593'	'100.0'	

== District 37 ==
=== General election ===
New Jersey general election, 1989
Party	Candidate	Votes	%	±%
Democratic	Byron Baer	36,657	32.8	▲1.6
Democratic	D. Bennett Mazur	35,997	32.2	▲0.8
Republican	Anthony J. Cassano	19,552	17.5	▼1.4
Republican	Arthur V. Gallagher	19,462	17.4	▼1.0
Total votes		'111,668'	'100.0'	

== District 38 ==
=== General election ===
New Jersey general election, 1989
Party	Candidate	Votes	%	±%
Republican	William P. Schuber	29,652	27.5	▲0.4
Republican	Patrick J. Roma	28,264	26.3	▲1.2
Democratic	Joseph Cipolla	24,983	23.2	▼0.9
Democratic	Greta Kiernan	24,739	23.0	▼0.7
Total votes		'107,638'	'100.0'	

== District 39 ==
=== General election ===
New Jersey general election, 1989
Party	Candidate	Votes	%	±%
Republican	Elizabeth E. Randall	36,010	30.1	▼2.2
Republican	John E. Rooney	34,271	28.6	▼2.7
Democratic	Gus D’Ercole	24,715	20.6	▲1.9
Democratic	Robert P. Contillo	24,709	20.6	▲2.8
Total votes		119,705	100.0	

== District 40 ==
=== General election ===
New Jersey general election, 1989
Party	Candidate	Votes	%	±%
Republican	Nicholas R. Felice	33,746	28.9	▼4.7
Republican	David C. Russo	33,432	28.6	▼6.0
Democratic	Paul Lief Rosengren	25,106	21.5	▲5.9
Democratic	Linda Villano	24,438	20.9	▲5.5
Total votes		'116,722'	'100.0'	
