= L. Grace Spencer =

American politician (born 1968)

Member of the New Jersey General Assembly from the 29th Legislative District district
- In office January 8, 2008 – June 30, 2016 Serving with Eliana Pintor Marin
- Preceded by: Wilfredo Caraballo; William D. Payne
- Succeeded by: Blonnie R. Watson

Personal details
- Born: March 15, 1968 (age 58)
- Party: Democratic
- Education: Rutgers University–Newark; Rutgers School of Law–Newark
- Occupation: Attorney
- Website: Assemblywoman Spencer's legislative webpage

L. Grace Spencer (born March 15, 1968) is an American Democratic Party politician, who served in the New Jersey General Assembly where she represented the 29th Legislative District from January 8, 2008, to June 30, 2016. Since July 2016, she serves as a judge of the New Jersey Superior Court.

== Biography ==
She served the City of Newark, New Jersey as Assistant Corporation Counsel from 1997 to 1999 and as a special prosecutor from 2000 to 2003.

Spencer graduated from Queen of Angels grammar school in Newark and is a 1986 graduate of Mount Saint Dominic Academy in Caldwell, New Jersey. In 1992, she graduated from the Rutgers University–Newark College of Arts and Sciences with a major in business management and was awarded a J.D. from the Rutgers School of Law – Newark in 1996. She is admitted to practice law in New Jersey and before the United States Supreme Court and the Court of Appeals for the Third Circuit. She was formerly a partner at Marshall, Dennehey, Warner, Coleman and Goggin, handling matters arising in professional-liability-law having practiced there since 2003.

She is a resident of the South Ward of Newark having lived there since 1979.

== Legislative career ==
Spencer and running mate Alberto Coutinho received the endorsements of the Essex and Union County Democratic Committees in the June 2007 primary for the General Assembly election from the 29th district. The two defeated incumbent Wilfredo Caraballo. She has been re-elected to two-year terms since that year.

Spencer served in the Assembly on the Environment and Solid Waste Committee (as Chair), the Appropriations Committee (as vice-chair), and the Women and Children Committee. She was a member of the Intergovernmental Relations Commission.

Spencer was nominated by New Jersey Governor Chris Christie in May 2016 to serve as a judge of the New Jersey Superior Court and was confirmed by the New Jersey Senate. After Spencer resigned from office on June 30, 2016, Blonnie R. Watson was selected to fill the seat and was sworn into office on July 21.

=== Sponsored bills ===
Spencer sponsored a bill, A3221, which would establish rules for requiring pet restraints in passenger automobiles.

=== District 29 ===
Each of the forty districts in the New Jersey Legislature has one representative in the New Jersey Senate and two members in the New Jersey General Assembly. The other representatives from the 29th District for the 2014-15 legislative session are:

- Senator Teresa Ruiz
- Assemblywoman Eliana Pintor Marin

New Jersey General Assembly
Preceded by Wilfredo Caraballo; William D. Payne	Member of the New Jersey General Assembly for the 29th District; January 8, 2008 – present With: Alberto Coutinho, Eliana Pintor Marin	Succeeded by Blonnie R. Watson
