= List of first minority male lawyers and judges in New Jersey =

This is a list of the first minority male lawyer(s) and judge(s) in New Jersey. It includes the year in which the men were admitted to practice law (in parentheses). Also included are other distinctions such as the first minority men in their state to graduate from law school or become a political figure.

== Firsts in New Jersey's history ==
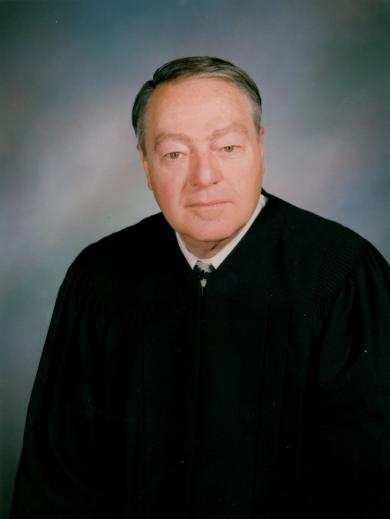
Joseph H. Rodriguez: First Hispanic American male Judge of the U.S. District Court for the District of New Jersey (1985)

=== Lawyers ===
- First African American male: George Jackson (1893)
- First African American male to argue a case before the Supreme Court of New Jersey: George A. Douglass in 1902
- First Deferred Action for Childhood Arrivals-recipient male (Indian descent): Parthiv Patel (2018)

=== State judges ===
- First Jewish American male: Daniel Nunez in 1722
- First Jewish American male (New Jersey Supreme Court): Samuel Kalisch in 1911
- First Italian American male: Themistocles Mancusi-Ungaro in 1914
- First Italian American male (New Jersey Supreme Court): C. Thomas (Crescenzo Tommaso) Schettino in 1947
- First African American male: Roger M. Yancey in 1956
- First Latino American male: John Joseph (J.) Dios in 1976
- First Puerto Rican male: R. Martin Oliveras in 1976
- First blind male (upon his appointment as an administrative law judge): Joseph Kane in 1990
- First Dominican American male: Hector DeSoto in 1991
- First Asian American male: Randolph M. Subryan in 1993
- First openly gay male (municipal court): Albert J. Mrozik Jr. in 1993
- First African American male (New Jersey Supreme Court): James H. Coleman Jr. in 1994
- First Korean American male: Sy Kim in 1999
- First Hispanic American male (New Jersey Supreme Court): Roberto A. Rivera-Soto in 2004
- First Arab American and Muslim American male (superior court): Hany Mawla (1998) in 2010
- First Indian American male: Sohail Mohammed (1993) in 2011
- First Latino American male (assignment judge): Julio Mendez in 2011
- First Palestinian American male: Abdel Majid Abdel Hadi in 2019
- First Native American (Cherokee Nation) male: Joshua David Sanders in 2021
- First Bangladeshi American male (superior court): Rahat N. Babar in 2022
- First Egyptian American male (superior court): David J. Labib in 2023

=== Federal judges ===
- First Hispanic American male (U.S. District Court for the District of New Jersey): Joseph H. Rodriguez (1958) in 1985
- First African American male (U.S. Magistrate Judge of the United States District Court for the District of New Jersey): Michael A. Shipp (1994) in 2007
- First Hispanic American male (Chief Judge; U.S. District Court for the District of New Jersey): Jose L. Linares (1978) in 2017
- First Asian American male (Pakistani descent) federal judge: Zahid Quraishi in 2019

=== Attorney General of New Jersey ===
- First Jewish American male: David T. Wilentz in 1933
- First African American male: Peter C. Harvey in 2003
- First Sikh American male: Gurbir Grewal (1999) in 2018

=== Public Advocate ===
- First Hispanic American male: Wilfredo Caraballo in 1990

=== New Jersey State Bar Association ===
- First Hispanic American male president: Joseph H. Rodriguez (1958) around 1979
- First openly gay male president: Thomas H. Prol in 2016
- First Latino American male president (New Jersey State Bar Foundation): Norberto A. Garcia in 2019

== Firsts in local history ==
- T. Gillis Nutter (1929): First African American male lawyer in Atlantic City, New Jersey [Atlantic County, New Jersey]
- Damon Tyner: First African American male to serve as the prosecutor for Atlantic County, New Jersey (2017)
- Menelaos W. Toskos: First Greek American male judge in Bergen County, New Jersey
- Edward A. Jerejian: First Armenian American male judge in Bergen County, New Jersey (2017)
- Franklin S. Montero: First Latino male judge in Bergenfield, New Jersey [Bergen County, New Jersey]
- Navarro W. Gray: First African American male Public Defender in Hackensack, Bergen County, New Jersey
- Isaac G. McNatt: First African American male judge in Teaneck, Bergen County, New Jersey (1979)
- Roger Lai: First Asian American male to serve as the President of the Burlington County Bar Association, New Jersey (2014)
- Joseph H. Rodriguez (1958): First Hispanic American male lawyer in Camden, New Jersey [Camden County, New Jersey]
- Julio Mendez: First Hispanic American male judge in Cumberland County, New Jersey (2002)
- Jose Velez: First Hispanic American male to serve as a municipal court judge in Vineland (2007) [Cumberland County, New Jersey]
- Jason Witcher: First African American male judge in Cumberland County, New Jersey (2014)
- John J. Dios: First Hispanic American male lawyer in Newark, New Jersey (1949) [Essex County, New Jersey]
- Harry Hazelwood Jr.: First African American male judge in Newark, New Jersey (1958) [Essex County, New Jersey]
- Wilfredo Benitez: First Hispanic American male to serve as a Judge of the Bloomfield Municipal Court (2017) [Essex County, New Jersey]
- Elliott Heard Jr. (1963): First African American male lawyer and judge in Gloucester County, New Jersey
- Lester S. Garo (1952): First Greek American male lawyer in Jersey City, Hudson County, New Jersey
- Ramy Eid: First Egyptian American male to serve as a Jersey City Municipal Judge (2014) and its Chief Judge (2021) [Hudson County, New Jersey]
- Hany Mawla (1998): First Arab American male judge in Hunterdon County, New Jersey (2010)
- Mitchell A. Davis: First African American male lawyer in Trenton, New Jersey [Mercer County, New Jersey]
- Pedro J. Jimenez, Jr.: First Hispanic American male judge in Mercer County, New Jersey (2008). He was also the first Hispanic American male prosecutor in the same county.
- Travis Francis: First African American male judge in Middlesex County, New Jersey
- Philip N. Gumbs: First African American male judge in Monmouth County, New Jersey (1976)
- Lawrence M. Lawson: First African American male to serve as an Assignment Judge of the Monmouth Vicinage (1993)
- Luis A. Valentin: First Latino American male prosecutor in Monmouth County, New Jersey (2005)
- David F. Bauman: First Asian American male (Japanese American) judge in Monmouth County, New Jersey (2008)
- Michael Paul Wright: First African American male judge to serve the Morris/Sussex Vicinage (2007). In 1990, he became the first minority lawyer to work for the Morris County Prosecutor's Office.
- Jason Witcher: First African American male to serve as a municipal court judge in Salem, New Jersey (2010) [Salem County, New Jersey]

== See also ==
- List of first minority male lawyers and judges in the United States

== Other topics of interest ==
- List of first women lawyers and judges in the United States
- List of first women lawyers and judges in New Jersey
