= 2004 United States presidential election in New Jersey =

- November 2, 2004
- Turnout: 72.63% (▲2.55%)

Nominee	John Kerry	George W. Bush
Party	Democratic	Republican
Home state	Massachusetts	Texas
Running mate	John Edwards	Dick Cheney
Electoral vote	15	0
Popular vote	1,911,430	1,670,003
Percentage	52.92%	46.24%

Kerry
40–50%
50–60%
60–70%
70–80%
80–90%
90–100%
Bush
40–50%
50–60%
60–70%
70–80%
90–100%
President before election
George W. Bush
Republican
Elected President
George W. Bush
Republican

The 2004 United States presidential election in New Jersey took place on November 2, 2004, and was part of the 2004 United States presidential election. Voters chose 15 representatives, or electors to the Electoral College, who voted for president and vice president. Democratic nominee John Kerry defeated Republican incumbent President George W. Bush by a 6.68% margin of victory in New Jersey. Bush, however, was re-elected to the presidency.

Prior to the election, most news organizations considered New Jersey a blue state that Kerry would win. Due to the impact of the September 11, 2001 attacks and Democratic Governor Jim McGreevey's resignation following threats of a sexual harassment lawsuit, political observers believed that the presidential contest in New Jersey would be closer than usual. Polls showed Senator John F. Kerry with a slim lead throughout the campaign, and the Republicans invested some campaign funds in the state. As of the 2024 presidential election, this is the last election in which Somerset County voted for a Republican presidential candidate.

== Primaries ==
- 2004 New Jersey Democratic presidential primary

== Campaign ==
=== Predictions ===
There were 12 news organizations who made state-by-state predictions of the election. The table below shows their final predictions before Election Day.

Source	Ranking
D.C. Political Report	Lean D
Cook Political Report	Likely D
Research 2000	Solid D
Zogby International	Likely D
Washington Post	Likely D
Washington Dispatch	Likely D
Washington Times	Solid D
The New York Times	Lean D
CNN	Likely D
Newsweek	Lean D
Associated Press	Solid D
Rasmussen Reports	Likely D

=== Polling ===
Kerry led by small margins in most pre-election polls taken in New Jersey. A final three-poll rolling average showed Kerry leading Bush, 49% to 42%.

Poll source	Date(s) administered	Sample size	Margin of error	George W. Bush (R)	John Kerry (D)	Ralph Nader (I)	Other	Undecided
Quinnipiac	June 11–16, 2003	815 RV	±3.4%	53%	37%	–	1%	9%
Quinnipiac	September 18–22, 2003	968 RV	±3.2%	48%	43%	–	9%	
Quinnipiac	November 6–10, 2003	1,027 RV	±3.1%	46%	45%	–	1%	7%
Quinnipiac	May 10–16, 2004	1,122 RV	±2.9%	44%	47%	–	1%	7%
Quinnipiac	May 10–16, 2004	1,122 RV	±2.9%	43%	46%	5%	1%	6%
Quinnipiac	June 15–20, 2004	1,167 RV	±2.9%	41%	49%	–	2%	7%
Quinnipiac	June 15–20, 2004	1,167 RV	±2.9%	40%	46%	7%	0%	7%
Quinnipiac	July 30–August 2, 2004	996 RV	±3.1%	38%	52%	–	2%	8%
Quinnipiac	July 30–August 2, 2004	996 RV	±3.1%	36%	49%	6%	1%	8%
Quinnipiac	August 19–23, 2004	887 RV	±3.3%	39%	51%	–	1%	8%
Quinnipiac	August 19–23, 2004	887 RV	±3.3%	39%	49%	4%	1%	8%
Quinnipiac	September 16–19, 2004	672 LV	±3.8%	48%	48%	2%	0%	2%
Quinnipiac	September 16–19, 2004	672 LV	±3.8%	48%	49%	–	1%	2%
Quinnipiac	September 16–19, 2004	943 RV	±3.2%	43%	47%	3%	1%	6%
Quinnipiac	October 1–4, 2004	819 LV	±3.4%	46%	49%	2%	1%	3%
Quinnipiac	October 1–4, 2004	819 LV	±3.4%	46%	49%	–	1%	4%
Quinnipiac	October 14–17, 2004	786 LV	±2.9%	45%	49%	1%	0%	4%
Quinnipiac	October 14–17, 2004	786 LV	±2.9%	45%	50%	–	0%	5%
Quinnipiac	October 14–17, 2004	1,123 RV	±2.9%	39%	46%	2%	0%	12%
Quinnipiac	October 21–25, 2004	852 LV	±3.4%	46%	46%	2%	1%	6%
Quinnipiac	October 21–25, 2004	1,179 RV	±2.9%	41%	45%	2%	1%	12%
Quinnipiac	October 27–31, 2004	984 LV	±3.1%	43%	48%	2%	1%	6%

Hypothetical polling

Poll source	Date(s) administered	Sample size	Margin of error	George W. Bush (R)	Generic Democrat	Other	Undecided
Quinnipiac	December 3–9, 2002	934 RV	±3.2%	43%	45%	2%	9%

Poll source	Date(s) administered	Sample size	Margin of error	George W. Bush (R)	Wesley Clark (D)	Other	Undecided
Quinnipiac	September 18–22, 2003	968 RV	±3.2%	47%	42%	11%	
Quinnipiac	November 6–10, 2003	1,027 RV	±3.1%	47%	45%	1%	8%

Poll source	Date(s) administered	Sample size	Margin of error	George W. Bush (R)	Hillary Clinton (D)	Other	Undecided
Quinnipiac	June 11–16, 2003	815 RV	±3.4%	54%	38%	2%	7%
Quinnipiac	September 18–22, 2003	968 RV	±3.2%	47%	45%	8%	
Quinnipiac	November 6–10, 2003	1,027 RV	±3.1%	46%	45%	1%	7%

Poll source	Date(s) administered	Sample size	Margin of error	George W. Bush (R)	Howard Dean (D)	Other	Undecided
Quinnipiac	September 18–22, 2003	968 RV	±3.2%	50%	40%	10%	
Quinnipiac	November 6–10, 2003	1,027 RV	±3.1%	48%	45%	1%	6%

Poll source	Date(s) administered	Sample size	Margin of error	George W. Bush (R)	Dick Gephardt (D)	Other	Undecided
Quinnipiac	September 18–22, 2003	968 RV	±3.2%	48%	44%	8%	
Quinnipiac	November 6–10, 2003	1,027 RV	±3.1%	48%	45%	1%	6%

Poll source	Date(s) administered	Sample size	Margin of error	George W. Bush (R)	Al Gore (D)	Other	Undecided
Quinnipiac	December 3–9, 2002	934 RV	±3.2%	48%	45%	2%	5%

Poll source	Date(s) administered	Sample size	Margin of error	George W. Bush (R)	Joe Lieberman (D)	Other	Undecided
Quinnipiac	June 11–16, 2003	815 RV	±3.4%	53%	39%	1%	7%
Quinnipiac	September 18–22, 2003	968 RV	±3.2%	49%	44%	7%	
Quinnipiac	November 6–10, 2003	1,027 RV	±3.1%	46%	47%	1%	5%

=== Fundraising ===
Bush raised $5,934,011 from New Jersey donors, while Kerry raised $6,513,274.

== Results ==
2004 United States presidential election in New Jersey
Party	Candidate	Votes	Percentage	Electoral votes
Democratic	John Kerry	1,911,430	52.92%	15
Republican	George W. Bush (Inc.)	1,670,003	46.24%	0
Independent	Ralph Nader	19,418	0.54%	0
Libertarian	Michael Badnarik	4,514	0.12%	0
Constitution	Michael Peroutka	2,750	0.08%	0
Green	David Cobb	1,807	0.05%	0
Socialist	Walt Brown	664	0.02%	0
Socialist Equality	Bill Van Auken	575	0.02%	0
Socialist Workers	Roger Calero	530	0.01%	0
Totals		3,611,691	100.00%	15
Voter Turnout (Voting age/Registered)				56%/72%

=== By county ===
County	John Kerry Democratic		George W. Bush Republican		Various candidates Other parties		Margin		Total votes cast
County	#	%	#	%	#	%	#	%	Total votes cast
Atlantic	55,746	52.54%	49,487	46.64%	864	0.81%	6,259	5.90%	106,097
Bergen	207,666	51.88%	189,833	47.43%	2,745	0.69%	17,833	4.45%	400,244
Burlington	110,411	53.09%	95,936	46.13%	1,609	0.77%	14,475	6.96%	207,956
Camden	137,765	62.36%	81,427	36.86%	1,741	0.79%	56,338	25.50%	220,933
Cape May	21,475	42.31%	28,832	56.80%	455	0.90%	−7,357	−14.49%	50,762
Cumberland	27,875	52.41%	24,362	45.81%	948	1.78%	3,513	6.60%	53,185
Essex	203,681	70.39%	83,374	28.81%	2,293	0.79%	120,307	41.58%	289,348
Gloucester	66,835	52.23%	60,033	46.91%	1,096	0.86%	6,802	5.32%	127,964
Hudson	127,447	67.24%	60,646	31.99%	1,461	0.77%	66,801	35.25%	189,554
Hunterdon	26,050	39.07%	39,888	59.82%	742	1.11%	−13,838	−20.75%	66,680
Mercer	91,580	61.25%	56,604	37.86%	1,326	0.89%	34,976	23.39%	149,510
Middlesex	166,628	56.33%	126,492	42.76%	2,685	0.91%	40,136	13.57%	295,805
Monmouth	133,773	44.60%	163,650	54.56%	2,516	0.84%	−29,877	−9.96%	299,939
Morris	98,066	41.70%	135,241	57.51%	1,847	0.79%	−37,175	−15.81%	235,154
Ocean	99,839	38.93%	154,204	60.13%	2,424	0.95%	−54,365	−21.20%	256,467
Passaic	94,962	55.43%	75,200	43.90%	1,149	0.67%	19,762	11.53%	171,311
Salem	13,749	46.17%	15,721	52.79%	311	1.04%	−1,972	−6.62%	29,781
Somerset	66,476	47.39%	72,508	51.69%	1,295	0.92%	−6,032	−4.30%	140,279
Sussex	23,990	34.54%	44,506	64.08%	962	1.38%	−20,516	−29.54%	69,458
Union	119,372	58.66%	82,517	40.55%	1,613	0.79%	36,855	18.11%	203,502
Warren	18,044	37.43%	29,542	61.28%	622	1.29%	−11,498	−23.85%	48,208
Totals	1,911,430	52.92%	1,670,003	46.23%	30,704	0.85%	241,427	6.69%	3,612,137

==== Counties that flipped from Democratic to Republican ====
- Salem (largest municipality: Pennsville Township)
- Monmouth (largest municipality: Middletown Township)

=== By congressional district ===
Kerry won seven of 13 congressional districts.

District	Kerry	Bush	Representative
1st	61%	39%	Rob Andrews
2nd	49%	50%	Frank LoBiondo
3rd	49%	51%	Jim Saxton
4th	44%	56%	Chris Smith
5th	43%	57%	Scott Garrett
6th	57%	43%	Frank Pallone Jr.
7th	47%	53%	Mike Ferguson
8th	59%	41%	Bill Pascrell
9th	59%	41%	Steve Rothman
10th	82%	18%	Donald Payne
11th	42%	58%	Rodney Frelinghuysen
12th	54%	46%	Rush Holt Jr.
13th	69%	31%	Bob Menendez

== Analysis ==
Generally, Kerry was very dominant in the urban centers of the state, particularly in Essex, Hudson, and Camden Counties. Bush won the largely rural parts of the state, such as the Northwest (Hunterdon, Somerset, and Morris) and Salem County in the southwest. He also carried the shore counties of Monmouth, Ocean, and Cape May.

This would also be the first election in which a Northern Democrat carried New Jersey since 1960 when fellow Massachusetts Democrat John F. Kennedy did so. The previous three Democratic presidential candidates to carry the state were all from the South (Lyndon B. Johnson was from Texas, Bill Clinton from Arkansas, and Al Gore from Tennessee), even though New Jersey is a northern state. This is the first time a president was elected twice without ever carrying any of the state's electoral votes either time, and only the second occasion (after 1860 and 1864) that any president won two terms without ever carrying the state's popular vote either time.

== Electors ==
The following were the members of the Electoral College from the state of New Jersey in 2004. All 15 were pledged to support the Democratic ticket of John Kerry and John Edwards.

1. Warren Wallace
2. Wilfredo Caraballo
3. Tom Canzanella
4. Carolyn Walch
5. Peggy Anastos
6. Bernard Kenny
7. Ronald Rice
8. Abed Awad
9. Jack McGreevey – (Father of former Gov. James McGreevey)
10. Wendy Benchle
11. Loni Kaplan
12. Carolyn Wade
13. Riletta L. Cream
14. Bernadette McPherson
15. Upendra Chivukula

== See also ==
- United States presidential elections in New Jersey
- Presidency of George W. Bush
