= Teresa Ruiz (politician) =

Member of the New Jersey State Senate

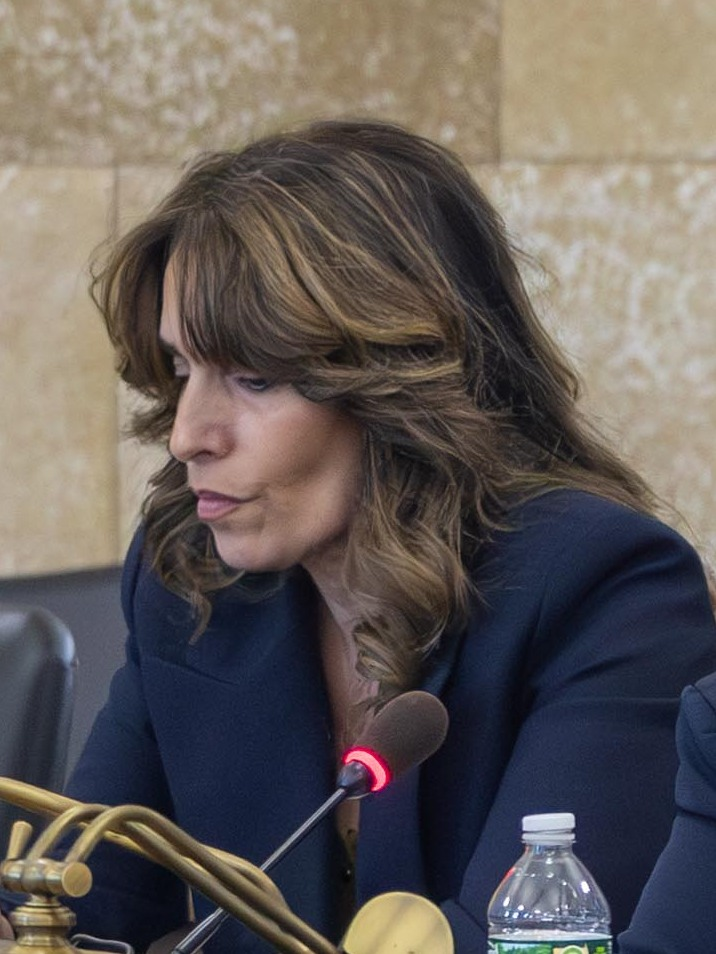
- Ruiz in 2026

Majority Leader of the New Jersey Senate
- Incumbent
- Assumed office January 11, 2022
- Deputy: Paul Sarlo
- Preceded by: Loretta Weinberg

President pro tempore of the New Jersey Senate
- In office January 9, 2018 – January 11, 2022
- Preceded by: Nia Gill
- Succeeded by: Sandra Bolden Cunningham

Member of the New Jersey Senate from the 29th district
- Incumbent
- Assumed office January 8, 2008
- Preceded by: Sharpe James

Personal details
- Born: Maria Teresa Ruiz; June 28, 1974 (age 51) Newark, New Jersey, U.S.
- Party: Democratic
- Education: Drew University (BA)
- Website: State Senate website

Maria Teresa Ruiz (born June 28, 1974) is an American Democratic Party politician from the state of New Jersey. Ruiz has represented the 29th Legislative District in the New Jersey Senate since taking office on January 8, 2008. She has served as the Senate Majority Leader since 2022 and is the first Latina to lead either house of the New Jersey Legislature.

== Education ==
Born and raised in Newark, New Jersey, Ruiz graduated from Our Lady of Good Counsel High School.

In 1998, Ruiz received a B.A. in English from Drew University.

== New Jersey Senate ==
With Sharpe James not running for re-election to the Senate seat in the 29th District, Ruiz won the support of Cory Booker and James' son. Ruiz won the June 2007 Democratic primary, running unopposed. In the November 2007 general election, Ruiz and her Assembly running mates Alberto Coutinho and L. Grace Spencer won the three seats from the district. Ruiz won with 57.8% of the vote, defeating five other candidates, including Democrats-running-as independents Luis Quintana (with 15.9%) in second place and William D. Payne (with 15.7%) who came in third.

Ruiz took office in the Senate in January 2008.

=== Committees ===
Committee assignments for the 2024—2025 Legislative Session are:

- Legislative Oversight (as vice-chair)
- Budget and Appropriations

=== District 29 ===
Each of the 40 districts in the New Jersey Legislature has one representative in the New Jersey Senate and two members in the New Jersey General Assembly. The representatives from the 29th District for the 2024—2025 Legislative Session are:

- Senator Teresa Ruiz (D)
- Assemblywoman Eliana Pintor Marin (D)
- Assemblywoman Shanique Speight (D)

== Election history ==
29th Legislative District General Election, 2023
Party	Candidate	Votes	%
Democratic	M. Teresa Ruiz (incumbent)	7,766	83.5
Republican	Maritza Mathews	1,351	14.5
Labour	Pablo Olivera	181	1.9
Total votes		9,298	100.0
Democratic hold			

2021 New Jersey general election
Party	Candidate	Votes	%	±%
Democratic	Teresa Ruiz	20,706	100.0	▲12.7
Total votes		20,706	100.0	

New Jersey general election, 2017
Party	Candidate	Votes	%	±%
Democratic	Teresa Ruiz	20,506	87.3	▲9.0
Republican	Maria E. Lopez	2,547	10.8	▼6.9
One Nation	Pablo Olivera	449	1.9	▼2.0
Total votes		23,502	100.0	

New Jersey general election, 2013
Party	Candidate	Votes	%	±%
Democratic	Teresa Ruiz	16,078	78.3	▼3.9
Republican	Raafat Barsoom	3,636	17.7	▲3.2
Unity Is Strength	Pablo Olivera	808	3.9	N/A
Total votes		20,522	100.0	

2011 New Jersey general election
Party	Candidate	Votes	%
Democratic	Teresa Ruiz	9,076	82.2
Republican	Aracelis Sanabria Tejada	1,598	14.5
Independent	Laurie J. Taylor	363	3.3
Total votes		11,037	100.0

2007 New Jersey general election
Party	Candidate	Votes	%	±%
Democratic	Teresa Ruiz	10,816	57.2	▼25.5
"The People's Choice"	Luis A. Quintana	3,687	19.5	N/A
Independent-Experienced-Unbossed	William D. Payne	3,653	19.3	N/A
Republican	Al-Samar Douglas	547	2.9	N/A
Pro Life Conservative	Dick Hester	123	0.7	N/A
Socialist Workers	Sara J. Lobman	96	0.5	▼4.4
Total votes		18,922	100.0	

== Awards ==
In January 2025, Ruiz was awarded an honorary Doctor of Laws degree from Montclair State University.

New Jersey Senate
Preceded by Sharpe James	Member of the New Jersey Senate for the 29th district 2008–present	Incumbent
Preceded by Nia Gill	President pro tempore of the New Jersey Senate; 2018–2022	Succeeded by Sandra Bolden Cunningham
Preceded by Loretta Weinberg	Majority Leader of the New Jersey Senate; 2022–present	Incumbent
