= Blonnie R. Watson =

American politician (born 1937)

Member of the New Jersey General Assembly from the 29th district
- In office July 21, 2016 – January 9, 2018
- Preceded by: L. Grace Spencer
- Succeeded by: Shanique Speight

Vice President of the Essex County Board of Chosen Freeholders
- In office 1998–2002

Member at-large of the Essex County Board of Chosen Freeholders
- In office 1997–2014

Personal details
- Born: February 3, 1937 (age 89)
- Website: Legislative web page

Blonnie R. Watson (born February 3, 1937) is an American Democratic Party politician who represented the 29th Legislative District in the New Jersey General Assembly from 2016 to 2018.

A resident of the Central Ward of Newark, Watson retired from the United States Postal Service, where she worked as a Systems Compliance Executive. She served on the Zoning Board of Adjustment in Newark and was elected to serve on the Essex County Board of Chosen Freeholders from 1997 to 2014. Elected to serve six three-year terms as an at-large freeholder, Watson served five years as the board's vice president and eight as president.

Watson was sworn into office on July 21, 2016, by Assembly Speaker Vincent Prieto, after being selected to fill the seat of L. Grace Spencer, who had resigned from office on June 30, 2016, to become a judge of the New Jersey Superior Court.

New Jersey General Assembly
Preceded by L. Grace Spencer	Member of the New Jersey General Assembly for the 29th District; January 12, 2016 – January 9, 2018; With: Eliana Pintor Marin	Succeeded by Shanique Speight
