= Shanique Speight =

Member of the New Jersey General Assembly

Member of the New Jersey General Assembly from the 29th district
- Incumbent
- Assumed office January 9, 2018 Serving with Eliana Pintor Marin
- Preceded by: Blonnie R. Watson

Personal details
- Born: November 14, 1978 (age 47)
- Party: Democratic
- Spouse: Andre Speight
- Children: 4
- Education: Lincoln University
- Website: Legislative web page

Shanique Davis Speight (born November 14, 1978) is an American politician who represents the 29th Legislative District in the New Jersey General Assembly since 2018, succeeding Blonnie R. Watson, who chose not to run for reelection. Speight has served in the Assembly as the Deputy Parliamentarian since 2022. She is a member of the Democratic Party.

Speight served briefly on the Municipal Council of Newark after being nominated by then-Mayor Cory Booker in November 2012 to fill a vacant seat, but was forced to vacate the seat the following month after a judge ruled that Booker lacked the authority to cast a vote given the circumstances.

== Early life and education ==
A resident of Newark, Speight graduated from Lincoln University with a Master of Arts in Human Services. An officer in the Essex County Sheriff's Office, Speight was first elected to the Newark Public Schools Advisory Board in 2007, and served as the board's vice chair from 2007 to 2012. She was an aide to Senator Teresa Ruiz from 2009 to 2010.

== Political career ==
After Donald Payne Jr. vacated his at-large seat on the Newark City Council after being elected to succeed his father in Congress, Speight was nominated by Mayor Cory Booker at a contentious November 2012 council meeting and sworn in to fill Payne's vacant seat, resulting in what The Star-Ledger described as a "near-riot". After the nomination, residents charged the sitting council members and Speight was knocked down. In December 2012, a New Jersey Superior Court judge ruled that Booker did not have the power to cast a deciding vote under the circumstances that prevailed at the meeting in question, forcing Speight to vacate the seat. In July 2013, the New Jersey Superior Court, Appellate Division affirmed the decision that Booker did not have the authority to vote to nominate Speight; a special election to fill the vacant seat was to be held in November 2013, with the council left in a four-four deadlock on the nine-member council until the seat would be filled.

== New Jersey General Assembly ==
In the November 2017 general election, with Blonnie Watson not seeking re-election, Speight (with 18,308 votes; 43.0% of all ballots cast) and her running mate, incumbent Eliana Pintor Marin (with 19,088; 44.8%), defeated Republican challengers Charles G. Hood (2,622; 6.2%) and Jeannette Veras (2,574; 6.0%) to win both Assembly seats from the district for the Democrats.

=== Committees ===
Committee assignments for the 2024—2025 Legislative Session are:

- Aging and Human Services (as chair)
- Regulated Professions (as vice-chair)
- Health

=== District 29 ===
Each of the 40 districts in the New Jersey Legislature has one representative in the New Jersey Senate and two members in the New Jersey General Assembly. The representatives from the 29th District for the 2024—2025 Legislative Session are:

- Senator Teresa Ruiz (D)
- Assemblywoman Eliana Pintor Marin (D)
- Assemblywoman Shanique Speight (D)

== Electoral history ==
29th Legislative District General Election, 2023
Party	Candidate	Votes	%
Democratic	Eliana Pintor Marin (incumbent)	7,488	42.5
Democratic	Shanique Speight (incumbent)	7,409	42.0
Republican	Orlando Mendez	1,419	8.1
Republican	Noble Milton	1,308	7.4
Total votes		17,624	100.0
Democratic hold			
Democratic hold			

29th legislative district general election, 2021
Party	Candidate	Votes	%
Democratic	Eliana Pintor Marin (incumbent)	19,919	49.14%
Democratic	Shanique Speight (incumbent)	19,576	48.30%
Salters For All	Debra Salters	1,037	2.56%
Total votes		40,532	100.0
Democratic hold			

29th Legislative District General Election, 2019
Party	Candidate	Votes	%
Democratic	Eliana Pintor Marin (incumbent)	7,957	40.73%
Democratic	Shanique Speight (incumbent)	7,652	39.17%
Republican	John Anello	1,545	7.91%
Republican	Jeannette Veras	1,399	7.16%
Jobs, Equal Rights	Yolanda Johnson	529	2.71%
Jobs, Equal Rights	Nichelle Velazquez	455	2.33%
Total votes		19,537	100%
Democratic hold			

29th Legislative District general election, 2017
Party	Candidate	Votes	%	±%
Democratic	Eliana Pintor Marin (incumbent)	19,088	44.8	▲5.6
Democratic	Shanique Speight	18,308	43.0	▲0.1
Republican	Charles G. Hood	2,622	6.2	▼2.3
Republican	Jeannette Veras	2,574	6.0	▼0.5
Total votes		42,592	100.0	
Democratic hold				

New Jersey General Assembly
Preceded by Blonnie R. Watson	Member of the New Jersey General Assembly for the 29th District; January 9, 2018 – present With: Eliana Pintor Marin	Succeeded by Incumbent
