= Robert J. Cleary =

American lawyer (born 1955)

Acting United States Attorney for the Southern District of Illinois
- In office January 30, 2002 – May 29, 2002
- President: George W. Bush
- Preceded by: W. Charles Grace
- Succeeded by: Laura J. Jones

United States Attorney for the District of New Jersey
- In office November 16, 1999 – January 17, 2002
- President: Bill Clinton; George W. Bush
- Preceded by: Faith Hochberg
- Succeeded by: Chris Christie

Personal details
- Born: September 30, 1955 (age 70) Brooklyn, New York
- Education: College of William and Mary (BBA); Fordham University (JD)

Robert J. Cleary (born September 30, 1955) is an American lawyer who has served as the United States Attorney for the District of New Jersey and for the Southern District of Illinois. He was the lead prosecutor in the Unabomber case. He is currently Of counsel at Patterson Belknap Webb & Tyler.

== Biography ==
Cleary was born in Brooklyn, New York in 1955. He graduated from The College of William & Mary in 1977 with a Bachelor of Business Administration and received his J.D. degree from Fordham University School of Law in 1980. He was admitted to the New York bar in 1982 and to the United States District Court for the Southern District of New York in 1983.

From 1987 to 1994, Cleary served as an Assistant U.S. Attorney for the Southern District of New York, eventually becoming Chief of the Major Crimes Unit. From to 1994 to 1999, he was the First Assistant United States Attorney for the District of New Jersey.

In 1996, Cleary was appointed lead prosecutor in the Unabomber case, United States v. Theodore J. Kaczynski. Kaczynski was charged with sending a series of letter bombs from 1978 to 1995, killing three people and injuring 23. Kaczynski was convicted and is serving a life sentence without the possibility of parole.

Cleary was sworn in as U.S. Attorney for the District of New Jersey on November 16, 1999, after his predecessor Faith S. Hochberg was appointed to be a federal judge on the U.S. District Court for the District of New Jersey. He served in this position until January 17, 2002, when he was succeeded by Christopher J. Christie. Later in 2002, he was appointed as Acting United States Attorney for the Southern District of Illinois while nominee Miriam Miquelon awaited confirmation.

In June 2002, Cleary joined the New York City law firm Proskauer Rose as partner.

In February 2006, in the wake of a police investigation codenamed Operation Slapshot, National Hockey League commissioner Gary Bettman announced that the NHL had retained Cleary to conduct its own investigation into the involvement of Rick Tocchet, an assistant coach for the Phoenix Coyotes, in an illegal bookmaking ring. After reviewing Cleary's report, Bettman announced in November 2007 that Tocchet would be reinstated in the NHL the following February.

In January 2024, Cleary joined the New York City law firm Patterson Belknap Webb & Tyler as Of counsel.

On February 27, 2024, the U.S. Trustee appointed Cleary as a bankruptcy examiner in the Chapter 11 bankruptcy proceedings of cryptocurrency exchange FTX. On March 20, 2024, the appointment was approved by Delaware bankruptcy judge John T. Dorsey.

Legal offices
Preceded by Faith S. Hochberg	United States Attorney for the District of New Jersey; November 16, 1999 – January 17, 2002	Succeeded by Chris Christie
Preceded by W. Charles Grace	Acting United States Attorney for the Southern District of Illinois; January 30, 2002 – May 29, 2002	Succeeded by Laura J. Jones
