= Evelyn Padin =

American judge (born 1960)

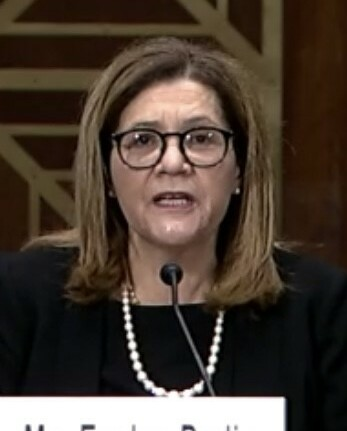

Judge of the United States District Court for the District of New Jersey
- Incumbent
- Assumed office June 24, 2022
- Appointed by: Joe Biden
- Preceded by: Faith S. Hochberg

Personal details
- Born: 1960 (age 65–66) Jersey City, New Jersey, U.S.
- Education: Rutgers University, New Brunswick (BA); Fordham University (MSW); Seton Hall University (JD)

Evelyn Padin (born 1960) is an American lawyer from New Jersey who is serving as a United States district judge of the United States District Court for the District of New Jersey.

== Education ==
Padin was born in 1960 in Jersey City, New Jersey. She received her Bachelor of Arts from Rutgers University in 1983, her Master of Social Work from Fordham University in 1985, and her Juris Doctor from Seton Hall University in 1992. Between college and law school, from 1985 until 1989, Padin worked as a social worker in New York and New Jersey.

== Legal career ==
Padin started her career as an associate at Linares & Coviello in Bloomfield, New Jersey, from 1992 to 1994. In 1995, she founded her own practice and was the senior managing partner of the Law Offices of Evelyn Padin, where her focus was on criminal defense and personal injury law. Padin served as a municipal court judge in Jersey City in 1998.

== Federal judicial service ==
On November 3, 2021, President Joe Biden announced his intent to nominate Padin to serve as a United States district judge of the United States District Court for the District of New Jersey. On December 15, 2021, her nomination was sent to the Senate. President Biden nominated Padin to the seat vacated by Judge Faith S. Hochberg, who retired on March 6, 2015. Padin was recommended by Senator Robert Menendez. On March 2, 2022, a hearing on her nomination was held before the Senate Judiciary Committee. On April 4, 2022, her nomination was reported out of committee by a 12–10 vote. On May 24, 2022, the United States Senate invoked cloture on her nomination by a 52–39 vote. On May 25, 2022, her nomination was confirmed by a 51–43 vote. She received her judicial commission on June 24, 2022. She is the second Latina federal judge for the District of New Jersey.

== Memberships ==
Padin served as the president of the New Jersey State Bar Association from 2019 to 2020. She also previously served as a trustee to the Hispanic Bar Association of New Jersey and on the Board of Governors for the New Jersey Association for Justice.

== See also ==
- List of Hispanic and Latino American jurists

Legal offices
Preceded by Faith S. Hochberg	Judge of the United States District Court for the District of New Jersey; 2022–present	Incumbent
