= Wynona Lipman =

American politician

Wynona Moore Lipman

Member of the New Jersey Senate
- In office January 11, 1972 – May 9, 1999
- Preceded by: Multi-member district
- Succeeded by: Sharpe James
- Constituency: 11th District (at-large) (1972–1974); 29th District (1974–1999)

Personal details
- Born: Evelyn Wynona Moore; 1923 LaGrange, Georgia
- Died: May 9, 1999 (aged 75–76) Newark, New Jersey
- Party: Democratic
- Spouse: Matthew Lipman
- Education: Talladega College; Atlanta University; Columbia University
- Occupation: Professor, politician

Evelyn Wynona Lipman (née Moore; 1923 – May 9, 1999) was an American Democratic Party politician who represented the 29th Legislative District in the New Jersey Senate. Lipman became the first African-American woman to be elected to the Senate when she won her seat in 1971, and her 27 years of service made her the Senate's longest-serving member at the time of her death.

== Early life and career ==
Evelyn Wynona Moore was born in LaGrange, Georgia in 1923, the daughter of John Wesley Moore, Sr. and Annabelle Torian Moore. Her parents met as students at Clark College in Atlanta, and her father owned a pharmacy and worked as a bricklayer. She and her siblings (John Jr., Eloise, and Donald) were educated at public schools in LaGrange and were also taught by their mother at home. She finished high school at the age of sixteen and went on to attend Talladega College, where she was a French major.

After graduation from Talladega she pursued a master's degree in French studies at Atlanta University and accepted a job teaching French at Morehouse College, an all-male historically black college in Atlanta. At Morehouse, she served as a tutor for Martin Luther King Jr.

She received a Rockefeller Foundation grant to pursue a Ph.D. at Columbia University. At Columbia, she received a Fulbright fellowship to study at the Sorbonne in Paris, where she stayed for two years (1950–51). In Paris she met Matthew Lipman, who was pursuing a Ph.D. in philosophy. They were married in a small civil ceremony in Paris. As Matthew Lipman was white, they could not have lived legally in her home state of Georgia or in fifteen other states with anti-miscegenation laws.

On their return to the United States, Wynona Lipman completed her Ph.D. at Columbia in 1952 and returned to her position as French professor at Morehouse. Matthew Lipman found work teaching at Columbia, and Wynona joined him in New York City, teaching at Elisabeth Irwin High School in Greenwich Village. They then moved to Montclair, New Jersey. After the birth of their two children, Karyne Ann and William, Lipman taught part-time at Montclair High School. She later became an associate professor at Essex County College.

== Political career ==
Lipman became active in local Democratic politics in Montclair, serving as Democratic committeeperson and later as town chairman. She won a seat on the Essex County Board of Chosen Freeholders in 1968 and was selected as president in 1971.

She did not seek re-election to a second term as a Freeholder, but instead ran for the New Jersey State Senate. She was successful, defeating incumbent Republican Senator Milton Waldor by a vote of 85,644 to 84,736. After redistricting, she moved to Newark, New Jersey and ran in the 29th legislative district, where she easily won re-election in 1973, 1977, 1981, 1983, 1987, 1991, 1993 and 1997. She never won less than 83% of the vote. Lipman was often the only woman serving in the Senate and was nicknamed "Steel Magnolia". As the New Jersey State House did not have a restroom for women, a state trooper would stand guard outside the men's room when she used it. In the Senate, Lipman served on the Governor's Advisory Council on AIDS and on the Task Force on Child Abuse and Neglect.

After legislative redistricting, Lipman and her family moved from Montclair to Newark in 1973 to remain in the 29th legislative district. She and Matthew Lipman were divorced in 1974.

Lipman died of cancer on May 9, 1999. She was survived by her daughter, Karyne Anne Lipman. Her son William had died of cancer in 1984. Sharpe James was chosen to fill Lipman's vacancy in the Senate.

Lipman was inducted into New Jersey's "Women's Hall of Fame" in 1998. In 2003, Kean University dedicated the Wynona Moore Lipman Ethnic Studies Center in her honor. The Wynona Lipman Child Advocacy Center, a center for abused children, is also named for her.
