= Joseph H. Rodriguez =

American judge (born 1930)

Joseph Henry Rodriguez
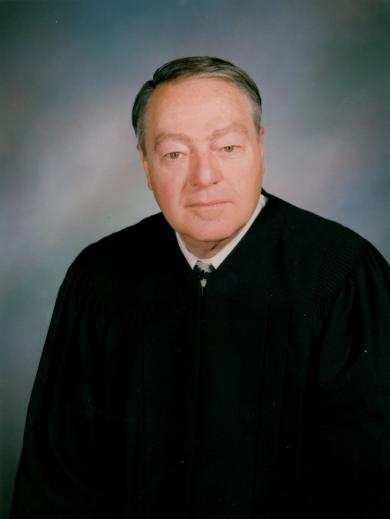

Senior Judge of the United States District Court for the District of New Jersey
- Incumbent
- Assumed office May 22, 1998

Judge of the United States District Court for the District of New Jersey
- In office May 10, 1985 – May 22, 1998
- Appointed by: Ronald Reagan
- Preceded by: Seat established by 98 Stat. 333
- Succeeded by: Faith S. Hochberg

Public Advocate of New Jersey
- In office February 11, 1982 – May 21, 1985
- Governor: Thomas Kean
- Preceded by: Stanley Van Ness
- Succeeded by: Amy R. Piro

Personal details
- Born: Joseph Henry Rodriguez; December 12, 1930 (age 95) Camden, New Jersey, U.S.
- Education: La Salle University (AB); Rutgers University (LLB)

Joseph Henry Rodriguez (born December 12, 1930) is an inactive senior United States district judge of the United States District Court for the District of New Jersey.

== Education and career ==
Rodriguez was born in Camden, New Jersey, to Mario, a survivor of the 1918 sinking of the passenger liner SS Carolina, and Carmen Martinez Chapel Rodriguez. Rodriguez received an Artium Baccalaureus degree from La Salle University in 1955 and a Bachelor of Laws from Rutgers School of Law–Camden in 1958. He was in private practice in Camden from 1959 to 1982. He was the Chairman of the New Jersey State Board of Higher Education from 1971 to 1973, and of the State Commission of Investigation from 1974 to 1979. He was a public advocate/public defender for the State of New Jersey from 1982 to 1985.

=== Federal judicial service ===
On February 28, 1985, Rodriguez was nominated by President Ronald Reagan to a new seat on the United States District Court for the District of New Jersey created by 98 Stat. 333. He was confirmed by the United States Senate on May 3, 1985, and received his commission on May 10, 1985. He assumed senior status on May 22, 1998. In 2007, Rodriguez wrote for a unanimous panel of the United States Court of Appeals for the Third Circuit when it held that challengers had no standing to bring claims of racially exclusionary zoning. In October 2025, The Philadelphia Inquirer reported that Rodriguez had become inactive the previous month.

== See also ==
- List of Hispanic and Latino American jurists
- List of first minority male lawyers and judges in New Jersey

== Sources ==
Legal offices
Preceded by Seat established by 98 Stat. 333	Judge of the United States District Court for the District of New Jersey; 1985–1998	Succeeded by Faith S. Hochberg
