= Sohail Mohammed =

Indian-American judge

Judge of the New Jersey Superior Court
- Incumbent
- Assumed office July 2011
- Appointed by: Chris Christie

Personal details
- Born: Hyderabad, India
- Education: New Jersey Institute of Technology; Seton Hall University School of Law
- Known for: Second Muslim Judge in New Jersey

Sohail Mohammed is an Indian-American Judge for the New Jersey Superior Court of Passaic County, New Jersey. Mohammed specialized in immigration law prior to his appointment in July 2011.

== Early life and education ==
Born in Hyderabad, India, Mohammed immigrated to New Jersey at the age of 17 where he was raised and naturalized. In 1988, he earned a bachelor's degree in electrical engineering cum laude from the New Jersey Institute of Technology. He worked full-time as an electrical engineer while pursuing a degree at Seton Hall University School of Law. While at Seton Hall, Mohammed founded the Science and Technology Law Society. He received his Juris Doctor in 1993.

== Career ==
Mohammed played a pivotal role as a liaison between law enforcement authorities and New Jersey's Islamic community after the 9/11 attacks. He worked with the U.S. Attorney's Office for the District of New Jersey and the FBI in building relations and providing outreach with the Muslim American community. He was involved in training over 7,000 members of the law enforcement community regarding Islamic culture and practices. He co-founded the American Muslim Union, an organization dedicated to cross-cultural understanding between Muslims and Americans. Mohammed represented dozens of detainees swept up by law enforcement after the 9/11 attacks in 2001. By 2003, he represented 29 individuals detained due to minor immigration law violations. Although none of these individuals faced charges of terrorism, the increase in immigration crackdown was a product of 9/11.

In 2011, New Jersey Governor Chris Christie faced backlash from conservative bloggers and journalists for nominating a Muslim American to the bench. Journalist Steven Emerson accused Mohammed of being "a longtime mouthpiece for radical Islamists" for his brief representation of Mohammad Qatanani, imam of the Islamic Center of Passaic County, while he applied for a green card. However, the two ended the attorney-client relationship before his deportation case started. Qatanani hired another attorney, Claudia Slovinsky, to fight the deportation case in 2008. Blogger Pamela Geller accused Christie of being "in bed with the enemy" due to his nomination of Mohammed. In support of his appointment, Christie responded, "[i]t's just unnecessary to be accusing this guy of things just because of his religious background." Sohail Mohammed was sworn into office in July 2011, becoming New Jersey's second Muslim judge.

In March 2014, Mohammed ruled on Plotnick v. DeLuccia, a precedential decision that "[has] never been litigated in New Jersey or the United States" prior to this case. The case involved a dispute between two unmarried biological parents over who can be present during the child's birth. The parents were estranged at the time of the delivery. The father filed for a preliminary injunction to be notified for when the mother would be in labor and to be present during the child's birth. No parties contended to the father's right to see the child after birth. Mohammed held that all patients, and pregnant women specifically, enjoy privacy protections that allow them to decide who can be at their hospital bedside.

In May 2015, Mohammed issued a decision concerning twins born to different fathers, the result of a rare scientific phenomenon known as heteropaternal superfecundation. Mohammed ruled that the defendant in the case fathered only one twin and therefore was only responsible for paying child support for that child.

== See also ==
- List of first minority male lawyers and judges in New Jersey
