= Faith S. Hochberg =

American judge (born 1950)

Judge of the United States District Court for the District of New Jersey
- In office November 15, 1999 – March 6, 2015
- Appointed by: Bill Clinton
- Preceded by: Joseph H. Rodriguez
- Succeeded by: Evelyn Padin

United States Attorney for the District of New Jersey
- In office 1994–1999
- Appointed by: Bill Clinton
- Preceded by: Michael Chertoff
- Succeeded by: Robert J. Cleary

Personal details
- Born: Faith Shapiro; March 5, 1950 (age 76) East Orange, New Jersey, U.S.
- Spouse: Mark Hochberg
- Education: Tufts University (BA); Harvard University (JD)
- Website: www.judgehochberg.com

Faith Shapiro Hochberg (/ˈhɒtʃbɜːrɡ/; born March 5, 1950) is a former United States district judge of the United States District Court for the District of New Jersey.

== Education ==
Hochberg was born in East Orange, New Jersey. She received a Bachelor of Arts degree from Tufts University in 1972. She received a Juris Doctor from Harvard Law School in 1975. She was a law clerk to Spottswood William Robinson III of the United States Court of Appeals for the District of Columbia Circuit from 1975 to 1976.

== Career ==
Hochberg was a special assistant to the Chairman of the United States Securities and Exchange Commission in 1976. She was in private practice in Newark from 1977 to 1983. She was an Assistant United States Attorney for the District of New Jersey from 1983 to 1987. From 1987 to 1990 she was in private practice with Cole, Schotz, Bernstein, Meisel and Forman in Hackensack. She was a senior deputy chief counsel for the Office of Thrift Supervision in the United States Department of the Treasury from 1990 to 1993, and was a Deputy Assistant Secretary for Law Enforcement in the Department of Treasury from 1993 to 1994.

Faith was the first woman to be appointed to the US attorney of New Jersey. She was assigned to several high-profile cases including the Unabomer case until Robert Cleary assumed her role in 1999.

== Federal judicial service ==
In 1994, Hochberg was named United States Attorney for the District of New Jersey, serving until 1999. She was nominated by President Bill Clinton on April 22, 1999, to a seat on the United States District Court for the District of New Jersey vacated by Joseph H. Rodriguez. She was confirmed by the United States Senate on November 10, 1999, and received her commission on November 15, 1999. She retired from active service on March 6, 2015.

== Post judicial service ==
Since March 2015, she has offered mediation and arbitration services through her company Hochberg ADR.

== Personal life ==
Hochberg and her husband Mark, a heart surgeon, have two adult children, Alyssa and Asher.

== See also ==
- List of Jewish American jurists

Legal offices
Preceded by Michael Chertoff	United States Attorney for the District of New Jersey; 1994–1999	Succeeded by Robert J. Cleary
Preceded by Joseph H. Rodriguez	Judge of the United States District Court for the District of New Jersey; 1999–2015	Succeeded by Evelyn Padin
