= New Jersey's 29th legislative district =

American legislative district

- Senator: Teresa Ruiz (D)
- Assembly members: Eliana Pintor Marin (D); Shanique Speight (D)
- Registration: 51.8% Democratic; 7.0% Republican; 39.9% unaffiliated
- Demographics: 18.8% White; 33.1% Black/African American; 0.8% Native American; 3.1% Asian; 0.1% Hawaiian/Pacific Islander; 29.2% Other race; 14.9% Two or more races; 45.4% Hispanic
- Population: 249,255
- Voting-age population: 192,742
- Registered voters: 130,950

New Jersey's 29th legislative district is one of 40 districts that make up the map for the New Jersey Legislature. It covers a portion of Essex County, specifically most of the city of Newark; and the Hudson County municipalities of East Newark and Harrison.

== Demographic information ==
As of the 2020 United States census, the district had a population of 249,255, of whom 192,742 (77.3%) were of voting age. The racial makeup of the district was 46,930 (18.8%) White, 82,416 (33.1%) African American, 2,008 (0.8%) Native American, 7,733 (3.1%) Asian, 172 (0.1%) Pacific Islander, 72,824 (29.2%) from some other race, and 37,172 (14.9%) from two or more races. Hispanic or Latino of any race were 113,095 (45.4%) of the population.

The district had 130,950 registered voters as of December 1, 2021, of whom 52,189 (39.9%) were registered as unaffiliated, 67,880 (51.8%) were registered as Democrats, 9,137 (7.0%) were registered as Republicans, and 1,744 (1.3%) were registered to other parties.

== Political representation ==
For the 2026–2027 session, the 29th legislative district of the New Jersey Legislature is represented in the State Senate by Teresa Ruiz (D, Newark) and in the General Assembly by Eliana Pintor Marin (D, Newark) and Shanique Speight (D, Newark).

The legislative district overlaps with New Jersey's 8th and 10th congressional districts.

== Apportionment history ==
Since the creation of the 40-district legislative map in 1973, the 29th district has always been based in and around Newark. In the 1973 map, the 29th district consisted of most of the South and East Wards (excluding Ironbound) and a portion of the Central Ward. For the 1981 redistricting, the 29th became all of the South and East Wards and a larger part of the Central Ward. In the 1991 redistricting, the 29th continued encompassing the South and East Wards and part of the Central Ward; the district now crept into a part of the North Ward and entered a new municipality, Hillside in Union County. In the 2001 redistricting, Hillside remained in the district but now most of the area of Newark was contained in the 29th district. After the 2011 redistricting, Hillside was removed and Belleville was moved into the district; again, most of the area of the city remained in the 29th.

Because of its heavily urban nature, the district tends to favor Democrats strongly. The 29th district is one of the few districts in the state to have ever elected only one party to all Senate and Assembly seats in every election since 1973.

== Election history ==
Session	Senate	General Assembly	
1974–1975	Wynona Lipman (D)	Ronald Owens (D)	Willie B. Brown (D)
1976–1977	Wynona Lipman (D)	Ronald Owens (D)	Willie B. Brown (D)
1978–1979	Wynona Lipman (D)	Eugene H. Thompson (D)	Willie B. Brown (D)
1980–1981	Wynona Lipman (D)	Eugene H. Thompson (D)	Willie B. Brown (D)
1982–1983	Wynona Lipman (D)	Eugene H. Thompson (D)	Willie B. Brown (D)
1984–1985	Wynona Lipman (D)	Eugene H. Thompson (D)	Willie B. Brown (D)
1986–1987	Wynona Lipman (D)	Eugene H. Thompson (D)	Willie B. Brown (D)
1988–1989	Wynona Lipman (D)	Jackie Mattison (D)	Willie B. Brown (D)
1990–1991	Wynona Lipman (D)	Jackie Mattison (D)	Willie B. Brown (D)
1992–1993	Wynona Lipman (D)	Jackie Mattison (D)	Willie B. Brown (D)
1994–1995	Wynona Lipman (D)	Jackie Mattison (D)	Willie B. Brown (D)
1996–1997	Wynona Lipman (D)	Jackie Mattison (D) (Note: Resigned on April 11, 1997 following his conviction for bribery)	Willie B. Brown (D)
1996–1997	Wynona Lipman (D)	Alberto Coutinho (D) (Note: Appointed May 22, 1997)	Willie B. Brown (D)
1998–1999	Wynona Lipman (D) (Note: Died May 9, 1999)	William D. Payne (D)	Donald Kofi Tucker (D)
1998–1999	Sharpe James (D) (Note: Appointed to the Senate on June 21, 1999, won a November 1999 special election to complete unexpired term)	William D. Payne (D)	Donald Kofi Tucker (D)
2000–2001	Sharpe James (D)	William D. Payne (D)	Donald Kofi Tucker (D)
2002–2003	Sharpe James (D)	William D. Payne (D)	Wilfredo Caraballo (D)
2004–2005	Sharpe James (D)	William D. Payne (D)	Wilfredo Caraballo (D)
2006–2007	Sharpe James (D)	William D. Payne (D)	Wilfredo Caraballo (D)
2008–2009	Teresa Ruiz (D)	L. Grace Spencer (D)	Alberto Coutinho (D)
2010–2011	Teresa Ruiz (D)	L. Grace Spencer (D)	Alberto Coutinho (D)
2012–2013	Teresa Ruiz (D)	L. Grace Spencer (D)	Alberto Coutinho (D) (Note: Resigned September 11, 2013)
2012–2013	Teresa Ruiz (D)	L. Grace Spencer (D)	Eliana Pintor Marin (D) (Note: Appointed to the Assembly on November 18, 2013)
2014–2015	Teresa Ruiz (D)	L. Grace Spencer (D)	Eliana Pintor Marin (D)
2016–2017	Teresa Ruiz (D)	L. Grace Spencer (D) (Note: Resigned June 30, 2016 to become a Superior Court judge)	Eliana Pintor Marin (D)
2016–2017	Teresa Ruiz (D)	Blonnie R. Watson (D) (Note: Appointed to the Assembly on July 21, 2016, won a November 8, 2016 special election to complete unexpired term)	Eliana Pintor Marin (D)
2018–2019	Teresa Ruiz (D)	Shanique Speight (D)	Eliana Pintor Marin (D)
2020–2021	Teresa Ruiz (D)	Shanique Speight (D)	Eliana Pintor Marin (D)
2022–2023	Teresa Ruiz (D)	Shanique Speight (D)	Eliana Pintor Marin (D)
2024–2025	Teresa Ruiz (D)	Shanique Speight (D)	Eliana Pintor Marin (D)
2026–2027	Teresa Ruiz (D)	Shanique Speight (D)	Eliana Pintor Marin (D)

== Election results ==
=== Senate ===
2021 New Jersey general election
Party	Candidate	Votes	%	±%
Democratic	Teresa Ruiz	20,706	100.0	▲12.7
Total votes		20,706	100.0	

New Jersey general election, 2017
Party	Candidate	Votes	%	±%
Democratic	Teresa Ruiz	20,506	87.3	▲9.0
Republican	Maria E. Lopez	2,547	10.8	▼6.9
One Nation	Pablo Olivera	449	1.9	▼2.0
Total votes		23,502	100.0	

New Jersey general election, 2013
Party	Candidate	Votes	%	±%
Democratic	Teresa Ruiz	16,078	78.3	▼3.9
Republican	Raafat Barsoom	3,636	17.7	▲3.2
Unity Is Strength	Pablo Olivera	808	3.9	N/A
Total votes		20,522	100.0	

2011 New Jersey general election
Party	Candidate	Votes	%
Democratic	Teresa Ruiz	9,076	82.2
Republican	Aracelis Sanabria Tejada	1,598	14.5
Independent	Laurie J. Taylor	363	3.3
Total votes		11,037	100.0

2007 New Jersey general election
Party	Candidate	Votes	%	±%
Democratic	Teresa Ruiz	10,816	57.2	▼25.5
"The People's Choice"	Luis A. Quintana	3,687	19.5	N/A
Independent-Experienced-Unbossed	William D. Payne	3,653	19.3	N/A
Republican	Al-Samar Douglas	547	2.9	N/A
Pro Life Conservative	Dick Hester	123	0.7	N/A
Socialist Workers	Sara J. Lobman	96	0.5	▼4.4
Total votes		18,922	100.0	

2003 New Jersey general election
Party	Candidate	Votes	%	±%
Democratic	Sharpe James	7,919	82.7	▼17.3
Green	Toy-Ling Washington	1,187	12.4	N/A
Socialist Workers	Abigail D. Tilsner	470	4.9	N/A
Total votes		9,576	100.0	

2001 New Jersey general election
Party	Candidate	Votes	%
Democratic	Sharpe James	25,510	100.0
Total votes		25,510	100.0

Special election, November 2, 1999
Party	Candidate	Votes	%	±%
Democratic	Sharpe James	10,526	82.3	▼4.4
Republican	Isaac J. Durrette	1,728	13.5	▲0.2
Socialist Workers	Eleanor Garcia	530	4.1	N/A
Total votes		12,784	100.0	

1997 New Jersey general election
Party	Candidate	Votes	%	±%
Democratic	Wynona M. Lipman	27,480	86.7	▼13.3
Republican	Elaine L. Guarino	4,226	13.3	N/A
Total votes		31,706	100.0	

1993 New Jersey general election
Party	Candidate	Votes	%	±%
Democratic	Wynona M. Lipman	20,734	100.0	0.0
Total votes		20,734	100.0	

1991 New Jersey general election
Party	Candidate	Votes	%
Democratic	Wynona M. Lipman	14,911	100.0
Total votes		14,911	100.0

1987 New Jersey general election
Party	Candidate	Votes	%	±%
Democratic	Wynona M. Lipman	10,678	100.0	▲14.5
Total votes		10,678	100.0	

1983 New Jersey general election
Party	Candidate	Votes	%	±%
Democratic	Wynona M. Lipman	12,906	85.5	▼2.8
Republican	Willie M. Brascher	2,182	14.5	▲2.8
Total votes		15,088	100.0	

1981 New Jersey general election
Party	Candidate	Votes	%
Democratic	Wynona M. Lipman	23,598	88.3
Republican	Louis J. Smith	3,125	11.7
Total votes		26,723	100.0

1977 New Jersey general election
Party	Candidate	Votes	%	±%
Democratic	Wynona M. Lipman	16,037	90.6	▲6.8
Republican	Manuel Angel Colon	1,658	9.4	▼6.8
Total votes		17,695	100.0	

1973 New Jersey general election
Party	Candidate	Votes	%
Democratic	Wynona M. Lipman	16,071	83.8
Republican	Lillie Simpson	3,098	16.2
Total votes		19,169	100.0

=== General Assembly ===
2021 New Jersey general election
Party	Candidate	Votes	%	±%
Democratic	Eliana Pintor Marin	19,919	49.1	▲8.2
Democratic	Shanique Speight	19,576	48.3	▲8.9
Salters For All	Debra Salters	1,037	2.6	N/A
Total votes		40,532	100.0	

2019 New Jersey general election
Party	Candidate	Votes	%	±%
Democratic	Eliana Pintor Marin	8,994	40.9	▼3.9
Democratic	Shanique Davis-Speight	8,664	39.4	▼3.6
Republican	John Anello	1,689	7.7	▲1.5
Republican	Jeannette Veras	1,535	7.0	▲1.0
Jobs, Equal Rights	Yolanda Johnson	609	2.8	N/A
Jobs, Equal Rights	Nichelle Velazquez	524	2.4	N/A
Total votes		22,015	100.0	

New Jersey general election, 2017
Party	Candidate	Votes	%	±%
Democratic	Eliana Pintor Marin	19,088	44.8	▲5.6
Democratic	Shanique Speight	18,308	43.0	▲0.1
Republican	Charles G. Hood	2,622	6.2	▼2.3
Republican	Jeannette Veras	2,574	6.0	▼0.5
Total votes		42,592	100.0	

Special election, November 8, 2016
Party	Candidate	Votes	%
Democratic	Blonnie R. Watson	40,208	86.8
Republican	Ronda Morrison	6,131	13.2
Total votes		46,339	100.0

New Jersey general election, 2015
Party	Candidate	Votes	%	±%
Democratic	L. Grace Spencer	7,146	42.9	▲2.5
Democratic	Eliana Pintor Marin	6,539	39.2	▲0.4
Republican	Nicholas G. Campione	1,409	8.5	▼2.0
Republican	Jeannette Veras	1,077	6.5	▼3.8
Wake Up Jersey	Pablo Olivera	498	3.0	N/A
Total votes		16,669	100.0	

New Jersey general election, 2013
Party	Candidate	Votes	%	±%
Democratic	L. Grace Spencer	15,259	40.4	▼1.6
Democratic	Eliana Pintor Marin	14,645	38.8	▼2.4
Republican	Aracelis Sanabria Tejada	3,957	10.5	▲2.2
Republican	Elaine L. Guarino	3,903	10.3	▲1.8
Total votes		37,764	100.0	

New Jersey general election, 2011
Party	Candidate	Votes	%
Democratic	L. Grace Spencer	8,572	42.0
Democratic	Alberto Coutinho	8,391	41.2
Republican	Elaine L. Guarino	1,736	8.5
Republican	Lisa T. Kistner	1,687	8.3
Total votes		20,386	100.0

New Jersey general election, 2009
Party	Candidate	Votes	%	±%
Democratic	L. Grace Spencer	21,205	44.1	▲10.2
Democratic	Alberto Coutinho	20,628	42.9	▲10.7
Republican	Fernando E. Linhares	2,787	5.8	▲3.0
Republican	Aracelis Sanabria-Tejada	2,761	5.7	▲3.2
Hillside And Newark	Joanne Miller	652	1.4	▲0.2
Total votes		48,033	100.0	

New Jersey general election, 2007
Party	Candidate	Votes	%	±%
Democratic	L. Grace Spencer	11,385	33.9	▼11.4
Democratic	Alberto Coutinho	10,797	32.2	▼11.7
Putting People First	Bessie Walker	4,966	14.8	N/A
New Women Leadership	Carlotta Hall	3,604	10.7	N/A
Republican	Miguel A. Sanabria	948	2.8	▼2.7
Republican	Elaine L. Guarino	829	2.5	▼2.7
For Our Community	Joanne Miller	417	1.2	N/A
Pro Life Conservative	Katie Fowler	227	0.7	N/A
Pro Life Conservative	Aisleigh Riley	221	0.7	N/A
Socialist Workers	Edward Beck	164	0.5	N/A
Total votes		33,558	100.0	

New Jersey general election, 2005
Party	Candidate	Votes	%	±%
Democratic	William D. Payne	24,325	45.3	▲2.5
Democratic	Wilfredo Caraballo	23,571	43.9	▲3.3
Republican	Miguel A. Sanabria	2,947	5.5	▼2.9
Republican	Elaine L. Guarino	2,800	5.2	▼3.0
Total votes		53,643	100.0	

New Jersey general election, 2003
Party	Candidate	Votes	%	±%
Democratic	William D. Payne	8,621	42.8	▼1.8
Democratic	Wilfredo Caraballo	8,179	40.6	▼2.8
Republican	Miguel A. Negron	1,700	8.4	▲2.7
Republican	Elaine L. Guarino	1,657	8.2	▲1.9
Total votes		20,157	100.0	

New Jersey general election, 2001
Party	Candidate	Votes	%
Democratic	William D. Payne	25,422	44.6
Democratic	Wilfredo Caraballo	24,739	43.4
Republican	Elaine L. Guarino	3,572	6.3
Republican	Tharien Arnold	3,236	5.7
Total votes		56,969	100.0

New Jersey general election, 1999
Party	Candidate	Votes	%	±%
Democratic	William D. Payne	10,302	42.3	▼0.5
Democratic	Donald Tucker	10,192	41.9	▼0.8
Republican	Elaine Guarino	1,686	6.9	▲0.4
Republican	Tharien Arnold	1,548	6.4	▲0.3 (▲5.9)
Socialist Workers	Kari J. Sachs	319	1.3	▲1.0
Socialist Workers	Brock Satter	287	1.2	▲1.0
Total votes		24,334	100.0	

New Jersey general election, 1997
Party	Candidate	Votes	%	±%
Democratic	William D. Payne	27,250	42.8	▲4.2
Democratic	Donald Tucker	27,188	42.7	▲8.8
Republican	Efrain Colon, Jr.	4,113	6.5	▼3.4
Republican	Rita MacGonigle	3,873	6.1	▼3.7
Independent	D. Kim Thompson-Gaddy	615	1.0	N/A
Independent	Tharien Arnold	334	0.5	N/A
Socialist Workers	Megan Arney	206	0.3	▼3.9
Socialist Workers	Brock Satter	156	0.2	▼3.5
Total votes		63,735	100.0	

New Jersey general election, 1995
Party	Candidate	Votes	%	±%
Democratic	Willie B. Brown	9,144	38.6	▼11.5
Democratic	Jackie R. Mattison	8,024	33.9	▼12.3
Republican	Robert D. Richardson	2,348	9.9	N/A
Republican	Lester S. Lewis-Powder	2,322	9.8	N/A
Socialist Workers	Toni Jackson	985	4.2	▲2.3
Socialist Workers	Robert B. Miller	881	3.7	▲1.8
Total votes		23,704	100.0	

New Jersey general election, 1993
Party	Candidate	Votes	%	±%
Democratic	Willie B. Brown	20,015	50.1	▲13.7
Democratic	Jackie R. Mattison	18,439	46.2	▲12.2
Socialist Workers	Steven A. Marshall	750	1.9	▲0.8
Socialist Workers	Marilee F.D. Taylor	749	1.9	▲1.1
Total votes		39,953	100.0	

1991 New Jersey general election
Party	Candidate	Votes	%
Democratic	Willie B. Brown	12,519	36.4
Democratic	Jackie R. Mattison	11,687	34.0
Republican	Janie R. Thomas	4,008	11.7
Republican	Kurt A. Culbreath	3,799	11.1
Proven Leadership	Delores W. Battle	1,720	5.0
Socialist Workers	Don Mackle	362	1.1
Socialist Workers	Jason Redrup	274	0.8
Total votes		34,369	100.0

1989 New Jersey general election
Party	Candidate	Votes	%	±%
Democratic	Willie B. Brown	16,786	44.5	▲1.5
Democratic	Jackie R. Mattison	15,440	40.9	▲1.5
Republican	Kurt A. Culbreath	2,447	6.5	▼1.3
Republican	David Blount	2,314	6.1	▼3.7
Independent Conservative Radical	Harold J. Young	749	2.0	N/A
Total votes		37,736	100.0	

1987 New Jersey general election
Party	Candidate	Votes	%	±%
Democratic	Willie B. Brown	9,740	43.0	▲7.8
Democratic	Jackie R. Mattison	8,911	39.4	▲5.7
Republican	Shahid S. Watson	2,225	9.8	▼6.4
Republican	Kurt A. Culbreath	1,766	7.8	▼7.2
Total votes		22,642	100.0	

1985 New Jersey general election
Party	Candidate	Votes	%	±%
Democratic	Willie B. Brown	12,736	35.2	▼7.1
Democratic	Eugene H. Thompson	12,224	33.7	▼7.9
Republican	Della Moses Walker	5,852	16.2	▲7.6
Republican	Kurt A. Culbreath	5,420	15.0	▲7.5
Total votes		36,232	100.0	

New Jersey general election, 1983
Party	Candidate	Votes	%	±%
Democratic	Willie B. Brown	12,233	42.3	▼4.7
Democratic	Eugene H. Thompson	12,035	41.6	▼4.6
Republican	Darryl Parraway	2,480	8.6	▲1.8
Republican	Beverly Thomas	2,164	7.5	N/A
Total votes		28,912	100.0	

New Jersey general election, 1981
Party	Candidate	Votes	%
Democratic	Willie B. Brown	22,475	47.0
Democratic	Eugene H. Thompson	22,093	46.2
Republican	Frances Ford	3,246	6.8
Total votes		47,814	100.0

New Jersey general election, 1979
Party	Candidate	Votes	%	±%
Democratic	Willie B. Brown	11,138	46.4	▲1.0
Democratic	Eugene H. Thompson	10,506	43.8	▼0.4
Republican	Calvin Thomas	1,250	5.2	▲0.3
Republican	John L. Pelt	1,086	4.5	▼0.2
Total votes		23,980	100.0	

New Jersey general election, 1977
Party	Candidate	Votes	%	±%
Democratic	Willie B. Brown	15,585	45.4	▲0.3
Democratic	Eugene H. Thompson	15,156	44.2	▼2.1
Republican	James Wade	1,677	4.9	▲0.4
Republican	Miguel A. Sanabria	1,607	4.7	▲0.6
Independent	Franklin L. Prather	274	0.8	N/A
Total votes		34,299	100.0	

New Jersey general election, 1975
Party	Candidate	Votes	%	±%
Democratic	Ronald Owens	14,910	46.3	▲8.7
Democratic	Willie B. Brown	14,536	45.1	▲7.7
Republican	Nolene C. Martin	1,457	4.5	▼2.1
Republican	Fred T. Swindell	1,309	4.1	▼2.2
Total votes		32,212	100.0	

New Jersey general election, 1973
Party	Candidate	Votes	%
Democratic	Ronald Owens	14,574	37.6
Democratic	Willie B. Brown	14,531	37.4
Republican	John R. Taliaferro	2,552	6.6
Unity Movement	David Barrett	2,486	6.4
Republican	Thomas F. Edwards, Jr.	2,448	6.3
Unity Movement	Franklyn Hutchins	2,216	5.7
Total votes		38,807	100.0
