= William D. Payne =

American politician

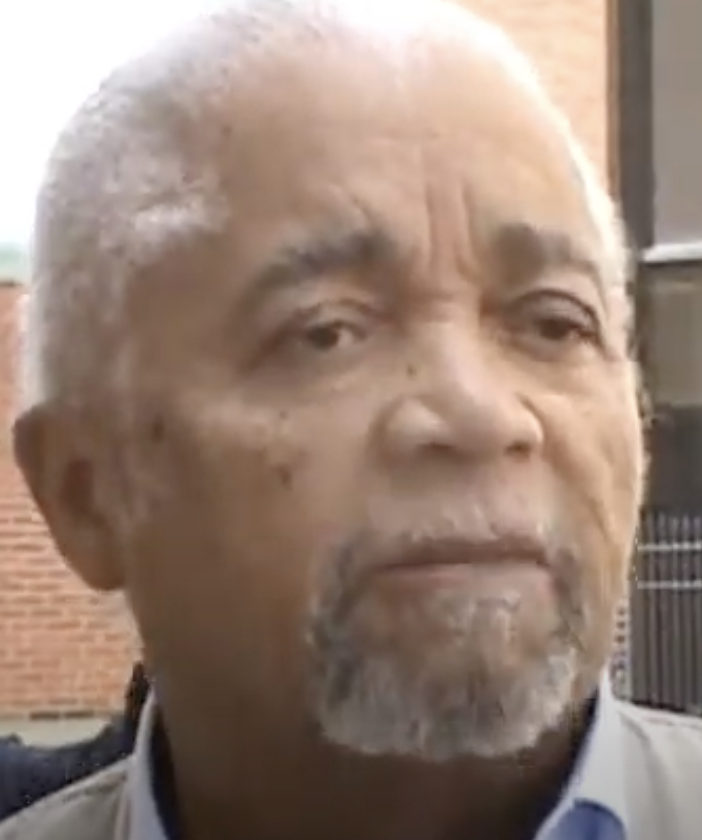
- Payne in 2011

Member of the New Jersey General Assembly from the 29th district
- In office January 13, 1998 – January 13, 2008 Serving with Donald Kofi Tucker, Wilfredo Caraballo
- Preceded by: Willie B. Brown, Alberto Coutinho
- Succeeded by: L. Grace Spencer, Alberto Coutinho

Personal details
- Born: July 8, 1932 (age 94) Newark, New Jersey, U.S.
- Party: Democratic
- Spouse: Divorced
- Relatives: Donald M. Payne (brother); Donald Payne Jr. (nephew); Craig A. Stanley (nephew)
- Education: Rutgers University
- Occupation: Public Affairs/Market Development Consultant

William D. Payne (born July 8, 1932) is an American Democratic Party politician who served in the New Jersey General Assembly from 1998 until 2008 where he represented the 29th legislative district. He served as the Assembly's Deputy Majority Conference Leader from 2002 to 2008.

== Early life, education, and business career ==
He was born in 1932 in Newark, New Jersey and has lived there his entire life. He received a BA in political science from Rutgers University in 1957. In 1962 he ran for Councilman at Large with the tagline, "Youthful, Qualified, Experienced". He founded the computer forms manufacturing company, UrbanData Systems, Inc., in 1969. He became the president and chief executive officer of the company until 1988. He was director of One to One/New Jersey School-Centered Mentoring Organization from 1992-1994. He was a manager for Prudential Insurance Company from 1993-1998.

== New Jersey Assembly ==
=== Elections ===
In 1997, he ran for 29th legislative district. He ranked second in the Democratic primary with 24% and qualified for the general election. He won the seat in the general election with 43% of the vote. He won re-election in 1999 (42%), 2001 (45%), 2003 (43%), and 2005 (45%).

=== Tenure ===
Among legislation successfully sponsored and cosponsored by Assemblyman Payne are legislation allocating funds which enabled the Newark Boys Chorus to perform in the Union of South Africa, a bill providing $750,000 to establish school-based mentoring programs for at-risk students in Abbott Districts. Assemblyman Payne's Amistad legislation established the Amistad Commission to incorporate African American history and contributions into the K-12 curriculum in New Jersey schools and, the practice of racial profiling by law enforcement and all civil service employees has been criminalized in New Jersey by landmark legislation of which Assemblyman Payne was the lead sponsor.

=== Committee assignments ===
Payne served in the Assembly on the Regulatory Oversight Committee (Chair), the Budget Committee (vice chair), and the Human Services Committee.

== Other political activities ==
=== Campaigning for others ===
Payne has been a campaign manager for his brother since 1988. In 1995, he was a campaign manager for Assemblyman Craig A. Stanley. After Stanley was elected, he was chief of staff to him from 1996 to 1997. He has also been the Essex County deputy chief of staff since 2003.

=== Commissions ===
Assemblyman Payne has served on the New Jersey Criminal Disposition Commission since 2004. Since 2003, he has been the president of the board of trustees of the Chad Independent School.

Payne has served on the New Jersey Joint Committee on Mentoring since 1999. He served on the New Jersey Tourism Advisory Council in 1998, on the New Jersey Congressional Award Council in 1995 and on the New Jersey Council on Adult Literacy in 1992. He served as chair of the Newark Housing Authority from 1986–1989 and was vice-chair of the Essex County Improvement Authority from 1980-1986.

=== 1994 Newark mayoral election ===
Payne decided to challenge incumbent Mayor of Newark Sharpe James in the May 1994 election. The mayor won re-election to a third term defeating Payne 64%-20%.

=== 2007 New Jersey Senate race ===
In the November 2007 general election, Teresa Ruiz and her Assembly running mates Alberto Coutinho and L. Grace Spencer won the three seats from the district. Ruiz won with 57.8% of the vote, defeating five other candidates, including Democrats-running-as independents Luis Quintana (with 15.9%) in second place and Payne who came in third with 15.7%, earning .

== Personal life ==
He is divorced and has four children. Payne's brother, Donald M. Payne, served in the House of Representatives representing New Jersey's 10th Congressional district. Following Donald M. Payne's death, Payne's nephew, Donald Payne Jr., was selected by the Essex County Democratic machine to replace his father. Payne's other nephew, Craig A. Stanley, also served in the General Assembly, where he represented the 28th legislative district from 1996 to 2008.

== District 29 ==
Each of the forty districts in the New Jersey Legislature has one representative in the New Jersey Senate and two members in the New Jersey General Assembly. The other representatives from the 29th Legislative District are:

- Assemblyman Wilfredo Caraballo, and
- Senator Sharpe James
