= Eliana Pintor Marin =

Member of the New Jersey General Assembly

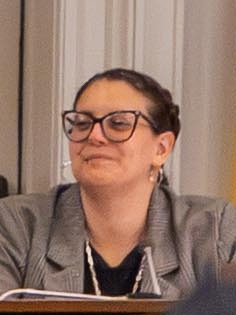
- Pintor Marin in 2026

Member of the New Jersey General Assembly from the 29th district
- Incumbent
- Assumed office November 18, 2013 Serving with Shanique Speight
- Preceded by: Alberto Coutinho

Personal details
- Born: October 23, 1980 (age 45) Newark, New Jersey, U.S.
- Party: Democratic
- Spouse: Anthony
- Children: 3
- Education: St. John's University, New York (BA, MA)
- Website: State Assembly website

Eliana Pintor Marin (born October 23, 1980) is an American Democratic Party politician, who has represented the 29th Legislative District in the New Jersey General Assembly, having been named to the seat on September 11, 2013, to fill the vacant seat of Alberto Coutinho following his resignation. Pintor Marin has served as the Assembly Budget Chair since 2018.

== Biography ==
Pintor Marin was born in Newark, New Jersey, on October 23, 1980, and was raised in its East Ward. After graduating from Mother Seton Regional High School she earned a bachelor's and master's degree from St. John's University in legal studies and government / politics respectively, before working for an investment banking firm. She is employed as the Division Manager of Passports and Vault Recording in the office of the Essex County Clerk and has served as a member of the Advisory Board to the Newark Public Schools.

She is the daughter of first generation Portuguese factory workers and is the first in her family to graduate from college. In addition to her professional and legislative work, she is a member of the Newark Portuguese Sports Club and the Director of the Portuguese School. She resides in the Ironbound neighborhood of Newark with her husband Anthony and daughter Amelia.

== New Jersey General Assembly ==
Coutinho resigned from office as of September 11, 2013, amid an investigation into a charity that had been established by his father. A special convention of 200 Essex County Democratic Committee members chose Pintor Marin to fill his vacant seat in the Assembly and to take his ballot position for the November 2013 general election.

Pintor Marin won election in November 2013 to serve the balance of the two years on Coutinho's seat and was sworn into office on November 18, 2013. She is Vice Chair of the Commerce and Economic Development Committee, and serves on the Budget Committee and Telecommunications and Utilities Committee.

=== Committees ===
Committee assignments for the 2024—2025 Legislative Session are:

- Budget (as chair)
- Appropriations

=== District 29 ===
Each of the 40 districts in the New Jersey Legislature has one representative in the New Jersey Senate and two members in the New Jersey General Assembly. The representatives from the 29th District for the 2024—2025 Legislative Session are:

- Senator Teresa Ruiz (D)
- Assemblywoman Eliana Pintor Marin (D)
- Assemblywoman Shanique Speight (D)

== Electoral history ==
29th Legislative District General Election, 2023
Party	Candidate	Votes	%
Democratic	Eliana Pintor Marin (incumbent)	7,488	42.5
Democratic	Shanique Speight (incumbent)	7,409	42.0
Republican	Orlando Mendez	1,419	8.1
Republican	Noble Milton	1,308	7.4
Total votes		17,624	100.0
Democratic hold			
Democratic hold			

29th legislative district general election, 2021
Party	Candidate	Votes	%
Democratic	Eliana Pintor Marin (incumbent)	19,919	49.14%
Democratic	Shanique Speight (incumbent)	19,576	48.30%
Salters For All	Debra Salters	1,037	2.56%
Total votes		40,532	100.0
Democratic hold			

29th Legislative District General Election, 2019
Party	Candidate	Votes	%
Democratic	Eliana Pintor Marin (incumbent)	8,994	40.8%
Democratic	Shanique Speight (incumbent)	8,664	39.4%
Republican	John Anello	1,689	7.7%
Republican	Jeannette Veras	1,535	7.0%
Jobs, Equal Rights	Yolanda Johnson	609	2.8%
Jobs, Equal Rights	Nichelle Velazquez	524	2.4%
Total votes		22,015	100%
Democratic hold			
