= Alberto Coutinho =

American politician (1969–2026)

Member of the New Jersey General Assembly from the 29th district
- In office January 8, 2008 – September 11, 2013 Serving with L. Grace Spencer
- Preceded by: Wilfredo Caraballo; William D. Payne
- Succeeded by: Eliana Pintor Marin
- In office May 22, 1997 – January 13, 1998 Serving with Willie B. Brown
- Preceded by: Jackie Mattison
- Succeeded by: William D. Payne

Personal details
- Born: June 16, 1969 Newark, New Jersey, U.S.
- Died: March 29, 2026 (aged 56) Newark, New Jersey, U.S.
- Party: Democratic
- Education: New York University (BS, MBA)
- Nickname: Albert Coutinho

Alberto Coutinho (June 16, 1969 – March 29, 2026) was an American Democratic Party politician, who represented the 29th Legislative District in the New Jersey General Assembly from May 1997 to January 1998 and again from January 8, 2008, until his resignation on September 11, 2013. He was eventually sentenced to probation after pleading guilty to theft and falsifying records, thus ending his career in New Jersey politics.

== Background ==
Coutinho was born in Newark, New Jersey, on June 16, 1969, the son of Maria and Bernardino Coutinho, two Portuguese-American community leaders in the city. He earned a B.S. degree from New York University, with a major in Economics and Finance, and was awarded an M.B.A. from New York University in International Operations and Organizational Behavior. He was a managing partner at Alter International beginning that position in 1998. Other positions he held include being the president of Coutex Inc. and a manager at Coutinho's Bakery, a long-time family business.

He served the City of Newark as Central Planning Board Commissioner from 1996 to 2005 and as a Zoning Board of Adjustment Commissioner from 1993 to 1996. He was an Essex County Utilities Authority Commissioner from 1992 to 1998. He was a resident of the Ironbound section of Newark.

Coutinho died in a traffic collision in Newark on March 29, 2026, at the age of 56.

== General Assembly ==
Incumbent 29th District Assemblyman Jackie R. Mattison resigned in May 1997 following his sentencing his on a conviction on bribery charges. Coutinho was chosen by the local Essex County Democratic Committee members to fill the seat until the expiration of Mattison's term in January 1998. His appointment to the New Jersey Legislature made him the first Portuguese-American to serve in the Legislature. He declined to seek election to a full term.

Coutinho was then elected to the General Assembly from the same district in 2007 defeating incumbent Wilfredo Caraballo in the June 2007 Democratic primary. In the Assembly, he served on the Commerce and Economic Development Committee (as Chair), the Budget Committee, the Human Services Committee, and the Joint State Leasing and Space Utilization Committee.

On September 6, 2013, Coutinho announced that he would drop out as a candidate in the upcoming general election. At the time, he cited family reasons and his health (he had suffered a heart attack earlier in the summer) for his retirement from the Assembly. He then resigned from the office on September 11, 2013, amid an investigation into a charity that had been established by his father. A special convention of 200 Essex County Democratic Committee members chose Eliana Pintor Marin to fill his vacant seat in the Assembly and to take his ballot position for the November 2013 general election.

He subsequently pleaded guilty the next day to theft and falsifying of records related to his personal use of funds intended for his family's foundation. He was sentenced to three years' probation and ordered to pay restitution amd declared ineligible to ever again serve as an elected official or public employee of the state.

New Jersey General Assembly
Preceded by Wilfredo Caraballo; William D. Payne	Member of the New Jersey General Assembly for the 29th District; January 8, 2008 – September 11, 2013; With: L. Grace Spencer	Succeeded by Eliana Pintor Marin
Preceded by Jackie Mattison	Member of the New Jersey General Assembly for the 29th District; May 22, 1997 – January 13, 1998; With: Willie B. Brown	Succeeded by William D. Payne
