= Eugene H. Thompson =

American politician

Member of the New Jersey General Assembly from the 29th Legislative District
- In office January 10, 1978 – January 12, 1988
- Preceded by: Ronald Owens
- Succeeded by: Jackie R. Mattison

Personal details
- Born: May 24, 1930 Newark, New Jersey
- Died: October 17, 1999 (aged 69)
- Party: Democratic

Eugene H. Thompson (May 24, 1930 – October 17, 1999) was an American politician who served in the New Jersey General Assembly from the 29th Legislative District from 1978 to 1988.
