= Willie B. Brown =

American politician

Member of the New Jersey General Assembly from the 29th district
- In office January 8, 1974 – January 13, 1998
- Preceded by: District created
- Succeeded by: William D. Payne; Donald Kofi Tucker

Personal details
- Born: June 18, 1940 Anderson, South Carolina, U.S.
- Died: January 5, 2009 (aged 68) Edison, New Jersey, U.S.
- Party: Democratic
- Children: Dianne N. Brown

Willie B. Brown (June 18, 1940 – January 5, 2009) was an American politician who served in the New Jersey General Assembly from the 29th Legislative District from 1974 to 1998.

He died of heart failure on January 5, 2009, in Edison, New Jersey at age 68.
