= Wilfredo Caraballo =

American Democratic Party politician

Member of the New Jersey General Assembly
- In office January 9, 1996 – January 8, 2008 Serving with Craig A. Stanley (28th district), and William D. Payne (29th district)
- Preceded by: Harry A. McEnroe; James Zangari
- Succeeded by: Albert Coutinho; L. Grace Spencer
- Constituency: 28th district (1996–2002); 29th district (2002–2008)

Public Advocate of New Jersey
- In office April 9, 1990 – July 31, 1992
- Governor: James Florio
- Preceded by: Thomas S. Smith
- Succeeded by: Zulima Farber

Personal details
- Born: January 1, 1947 (age 79) Yabucoa, Puerto Rico
- Party: Democratic
- Education: St. Joseph's Seminary and College (BA); New York University School of Law (JD)

Wilfredo Caraballo (born January 1, 1947) is an American Democratic Party politician, who served in the New Jersey General Assembly from 1996 to 2008. He represented the 29th legislative district. Caraballo also served as the assembly's speaker pro tempore in the 2006–2008 legislative session, he was the parliamentarian from 2002 to 2006 and associate minority leader from 1998 to 2001.

== Background ==
Caraballo was born in Yabucoa, Puerto Rico. He received a B.A. from St. Joseph's Seminary and College in Philosophy (1969) and was awarded a J.D. from the New York University School of Law (1975).

== Early career ==
Caraballo served on the South Orange, New Jersey Budget Advisory Committee from 1986 to 1987. He then served was a trustee of the South Orange-Maplewood School District Board of Education from 1987 to 1990. Caraballo was a member of New Jersey's Martin Luther King Jr. Commemorative Commission from 1988 to 1990.

Caraballo was a distinguished visiting professor at New York University School of Law in 1986. He served as associate dean of Seton Hall University School of Law from 1988 through March 1990, where he was instrumental in creating the LEO program to create opportunities for disadvantaged students to attend Seton Hall.

In early 1990, Caraballo left Seton Hall when Governor of New Jersey James Florio brought him into the executive branch of the government of New Jersey, to serve as the New Jersey Public Advocate and Public Defender. Caraballo served from 1990 to 1992, then resigned in protest of Republican efforts to reduce his powers; when the Republicans took the governorship in 1994, they stopped filling the position.

Caraballo then served as president of the Hispanic National Bar Association, from 1993 to 1994.

== Elected official ==
Each of the forty districts in the New Jersey Legislature has one representative in the New Jersey Senate and two members in the New Jersey General Assembly.

Caraballo was first elected to the New Jersey General Assembly for the 1996–98 term, as an assemblyman for the 28th Legislative District, containing portions of Essex County, including South Orange, Maplewood and a northwest portion of Newark. He was re-elected in the 28th Legislative District, then was re-elected in the 29th Legislative District after the 2001 redistricting.

Caraballo served in the Assembly on the Regulated Professions and Independent Authorities Committee (as chair) and on the Joint Legislative Committee on Ethical Standards.

In the 2004 presidential election, Caraballo was one of New Jersey's presidential electors, casting the state's 15 Electoral College votes after election day. New Jersey's electors cast their ballots on December 13, 2004, in the State House Annex, in Trenton, where all 15 votes were cast for the Democratic Party candidate John Kerry.

In the June 5, 2007 primary election, Caraballo failed to win nomination to run for the New Jersey General Assembly, 2008–10 term, after an internal battle with the party and political machines.

== Later career ==
Caraballo returned to the Seton Hall University School of Law, where he is currently a tenured professor of law.

In 2014, Carabello ran as candidate for councilman at-large for the Municipal Council of Newark, on the slate of mayoral candidate Shavar Jeffries; neither was elected.

New Jersey General Assembly
Preceded by James Zangari	Member of the New Jersey General Assembly from the 28th district 1996–2002	Succeeded by Donald Kofi Tucker
Preceded by Donald Kofi Tucker	Member of the New Jersey General Assembly from the 29th district 2002–2008	Succeeded by Alberto Coutinho
