= 1992 United States House of Representatives elections in New Jersey =

- November 3, 1992

All 13 New Jersey seats to the United States House of Representatives
- Turnout: 82% (▲28pp)
	Majority party	Minority party
Party	Democratic	Republican
Last election	8	6
Seats won	7	6
Seat change	▼1	Steady
Popular vote	1,354,915	1,503,145
Percentage	45.3%	50.2%
Swing	▼0.53pp	▲0.34pp

Democratic
40–50%
50–60%
60–70%
70–80%
Republican
40–50%
50–60%
60–70%
70–80%

The 1992 United States House of Representatives elections in New Jersey were held on November 3, 1992, to determine who would represent the people of New Jersey in the United States House of Representatives. This election coincided with national elections for U.S. House and U.S. Senate. New Jersey had thirteen seats in the House, apportioned according to the 1990 United States census. Representatives are elected for two-year terms.

Due to legislative redistricting, New Jersey lost one seat in the House. Four incumbent representatives, three Democrats and one Republican, chose to retire; each was succeeded by a member of their own party.

== Overview ==
1992 United States House of Representatives elections in New Jersey
Party	Votes	Percentage	Candidates	Seats	+/–
Democratic	1,354,915	45.29%	13	7	▼1
Republican	1,503,145	50.24%	13	6	Steady
Libertarian	27,378	0.92%	13	0	Steady
America First Populist	10,561	0.35%	11	0	Steady
Conservative	3,358	0.11%	2	0	Steady
Socialist Workers	3,324	0.11%	4	0	Steady
Communist	1,525	0.05%	1	0	Steady
Independents	87,533	2.93%	32	0	Steady
Totals	2,991,739	100.00%	76	13	▼1

== Background ==
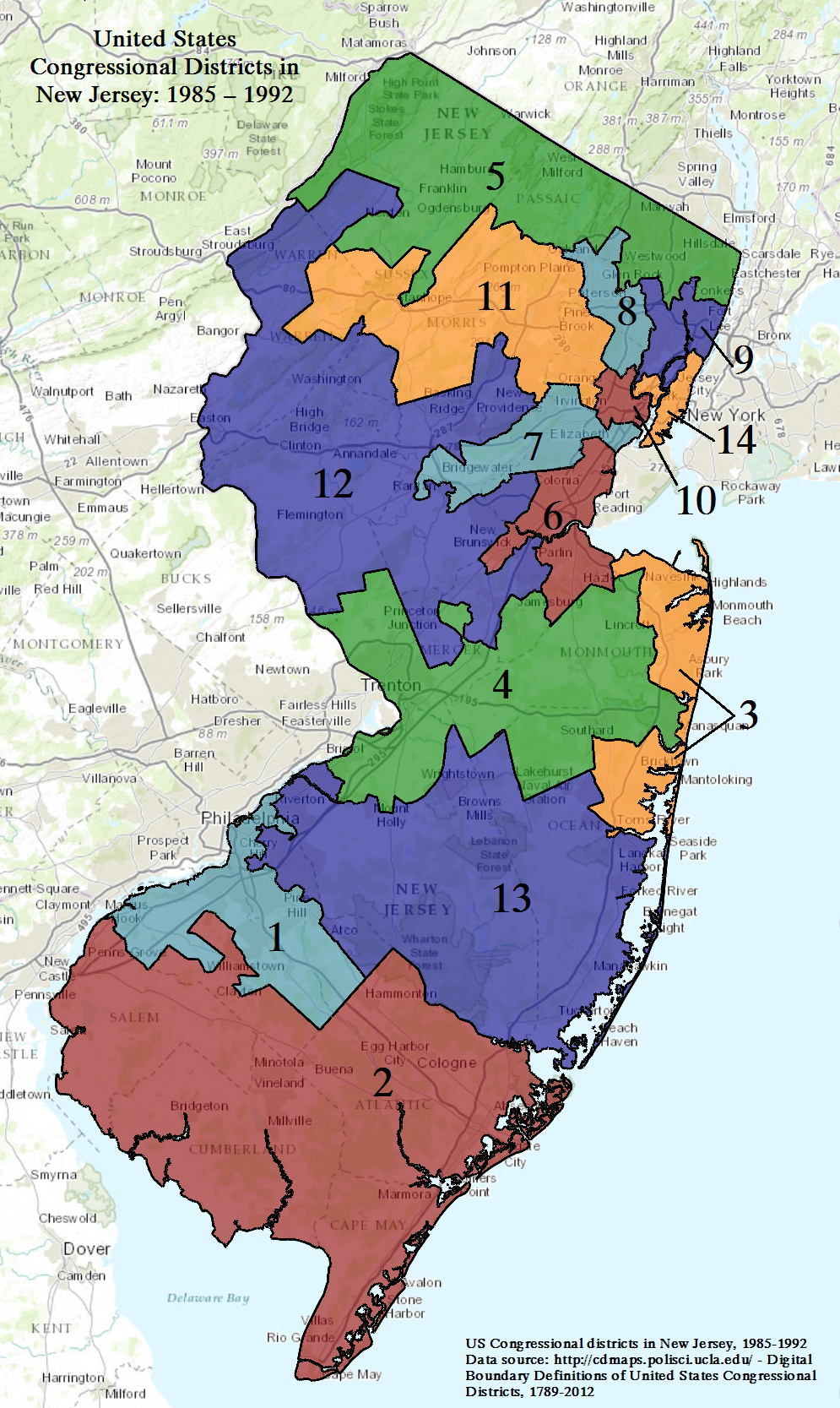
1985–92

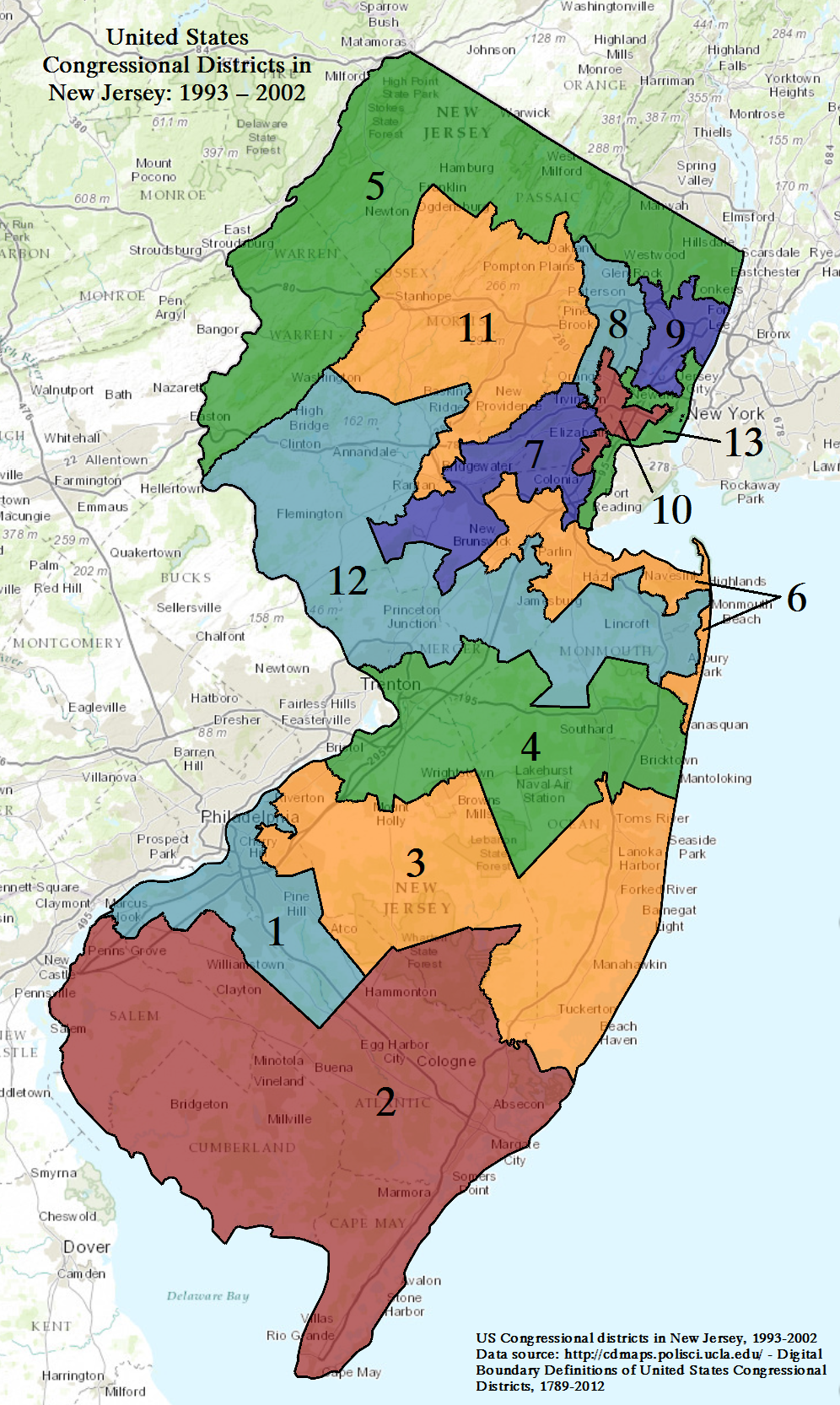
1993–2002

New Jersey congressional districts before (left) and after (right) the 1990 census decennial redistricting

The elections followed the 1991 state elections, in which Republicans gained veto-proof majorities in both chambers of the New Jersey legislature as the result of backlash against Governor Jim Florio's legislative priorities, particularly a large tax increase. Several Republican legislators, including both newly elected and veteran lawmakers, sought seats in Congress in the 1992 election. Due to their large veto-proof majorities, the Republican Party controlled the redistricting process for congressional elections.

Following the 1990 United States census, New Jersey undertook decennial redistricting, resulting in the loss of one seat. To account for the reduction in apportionment, the third and sixth districts on the northern Jersey Shore were combined; Bernard J. Dwyer retired rather than run against fellow incumbent Frank Pallone. In addition to Dwyer, three representatives of populous North Jersey districts (Robert Roe, Frank Guarini, and Matt Rinaldo) chose to retire rather than run for re-election in their newly configured seats.

The deadline for candidates to file petitions for the primary election was April 9. Primary elections were held on June 2.

== District 1 ==
1992 New Jersey's 1st congressional district election
- November 3, 1992
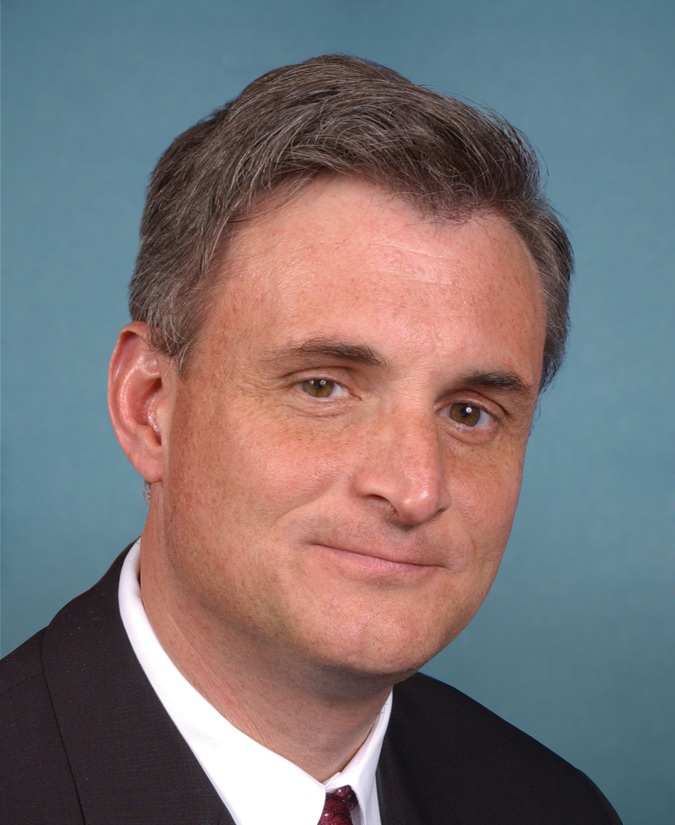

Nominee	Rob Andrews	Lee Solomon
Party	Democratic	Republican
Popular vote	153,525	65,123
Percentage	67.3%	28.6%
U.S. Representative before election
Rob Andrews
Democratic
Elected U.S. Representative
Rob Andrews
Democratic

Incumbent Democrat Rob Andrews won. The district included parts of Burlington, Camden, and Gloucester counties.

=== Democratic primary ===
==== Candidates ====
- Rob Andrews, incumbent Representative from Bellmawr since 1990

==== Results ====
1992 Democratic primary
Party	Candidate	Votes	%
Democratic	Rob Andrews (incumbent)	27,696	100.00%
Total votes		27,696	100.00%

=== Republican primary ===
==== Candidates ====
- Lee Solomon, assemblyman from Haddon Heights

==== Results ====
1992 Republican primary
Party	Candidate	Votes	%
Republican	Lee Solomon	11,199	100.00%
Total votes		11,199	100.00%

=== General election ===
==== Candidates ====
- Rob Andrews, incumbent Representative from Bellmawr since 1990 (Democratic)
- Kenneth L. Lowndes (Pro-Life Independent Conservative)
- Nicholas Pastuch (America First Populist)
- James E. Smith (Pro-Life Pro-Family Veteran)
- Lee Solomon, assemblyman from Haddon Heights (Republican)
- Jerry Zeldin (Libertarian)

==== Results ====
1992 U.S. House election
Party	Candidate	Votes	%	±%
Democratic	Rob Andrews (incumbent)	153,525	67.31%	▲13.19
Republican	Lee Solomon	65,123	28.55%	▼14.28
Independent	James E. Smith	3,761	1.65%	N/A
Libertarian	Jerry Zeldin	2,641	1.16%	▼0.03
Independent	Kenneth L. Lowndes	2,163	0.95%	N/A
Populist	Nicholas Pastuch	859	0.38%	▼0.42
Total votes		228,072	100.00%	
Democratic hold		Swing	{{{swing}}}	

== District 2 ==
1992 New Jersey's 2nd congressional district election
- November 3, 1992
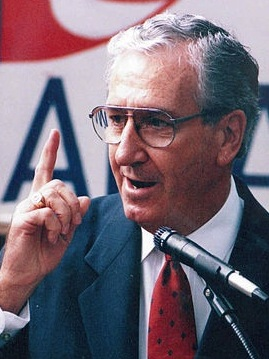

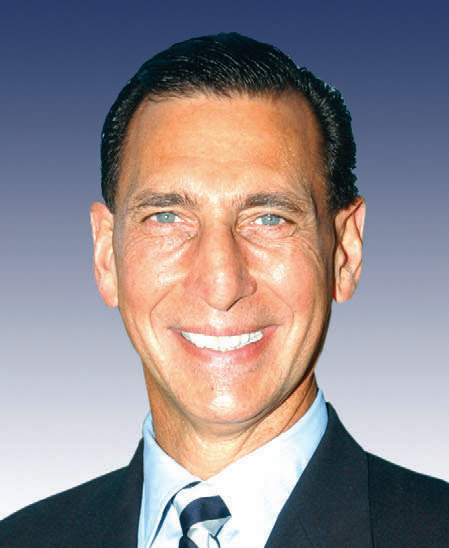
Nominee	William J. Hughes	Frank LoBiondo
Party	Democratic	Republican
Popular vote	132,465	98,315
Percentage	55.9%	41.5%
U.S. Representative before election
William J. Hughes
Democratic
Elected U.S. Representative
William J. Hughes
Democratic

Incumbent William J. Hughes won. This district, the largest in South Jersey, included all of Atlantic, Cape May, Cumberland, and Salem counties and parts of Burlington and Gloucester counties.

=== Democratic primary ===
==== Candidates ====
- William J. Hughes, incumbent Representative since 1975

==== Results ====
1992 Democratic primary
Party	Candidate	Votes	%
Democratic	William J. Hughes (incumbent)	19,393	100.00%
Total votes		19,393	100.00%

=== Republican primary ===
==== Candidates ====
- Joseph L. Breeden
- Frank LoBiondo, assemblyman from Vineland

==== Results ====
1992 Republican primary
Party	Candidate	Votes	%
Republican	Frank LoBiondo	18,927	79.66%
Republican	Joseph L. Breeden	4,833	20.34%
Total votes		23,760	100.00%

=== General election ===
==== Candidates ====
- Roger Bacon (Libertarian)
- William J. Hughes, incumbent Representative since 1975 (Democratic)
- Andrea Lippi (Freedom Equality Prosperity)
- Frank LoBiondo, assemblyman from Vineland (Republican)
- Joseph Ponczek (Anti-Tax)

==== Campaign ====
Despite Hughes's popularity in the district, LoBiondo waged an aggressive challenge, criticizing Hughes for taking full advantage of Congressional mailing and automobile privileges. LoBiondo, a leading sponsor of legislation to repeal the state's strict ban on "assault-type firearms," received strong support from the National Rifle Association and Coalition of New Jersey Sportsmen.

==== Endorsements ====
Frank LoBiondo (R)

Organizations

- Coalition of New Jersey Sportsmen
- NRA Political Victory Fund

==== Results ====
1992 U.S. House election
Party	Candidate	Votes	%	±%
Democratic	William J. Hughes (incumbent)	132,455	55.88%	▼22.28
Republican	Frank LoBiondo	98,315	41.48%	N/A
Libertarian	Roger Bacon	2,575	1.09%	N/A
Independent	Joseph Ponczek	2,067	0.87%	N/A
Independent	Andrea Lippi	1,605	0.68%	N/A
Total votes		237,027	100.00%	
Republican hold		Swing	{{{swing}}}	

== District 3 ==
1992 New Jersey's 3rd congressional district election
- November 3, 1992
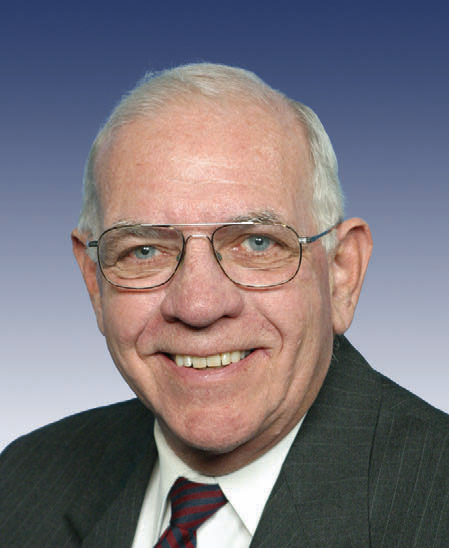

Nominee	Jim Saxton	Timothy Ryan
Party	Republican	Democratic
Popular vote	151,368	94,012
Percentage	59.2%	36.8%
U.S. Representative before election
Jim Saxton
Republican
Elected U.S. Representative
Jim Saxton
Republican

Incumbent Republican Jim Saxton won. This district, which had previously been numbered as the thirteenth district, included parts of Burlington, Camden, and Ocean counties.

=== Republican primary ===
==== Candidates ====
- Frank W. Drake
- Jim Saxton, incumbent Representative from Mount Holly since 1984

==== Results ====
1992 Republican primary
Party	Candidate	Votes	%
Republican	Jim Saxton (incumbent)	25,388	89.29%
Republican	Frank W. Drake	3,044	10.71%
Total votes		28,432	100.00%

=== Democratic primary ===
==== Candidates ====
- Howard Scott Pearlman
- Timothy E. Ryan

==== Results ====
1992 Democratic primary
Party	Candidate	Votes	%
Democratic	Timothy E. Ryan	15,407	85.44%
Democratic	Howard Scott Pearlman	2,626	14.56%
Total votes		18,033	100.00%

=== General election ===
==== Candidates ====
- Frank Burke (Basic Reformed Government)
- Martin T. King (Independent)
- William Donald McMahon ("Donald of Moorestown")
- Michael S. Permuko (NJ Conservative)
- Joseph A. Plonski (America First Populist)
- Helen L. Radder (Libertarian)
- James Reilly (Independent)
- Timothy E. Ryan (Democratic)
- Jim Saxton, incumbent Representative from Mount Holly since 1984 (Republican)
- Anthony J. Verderese (Independent)

==== Results ====
1992 U.S. House election
Party	Candidate	Votes	%	±%
Republican	Jim Saxton (incumbent)	151,368	59.17%	▲1.01
Democratic	Timothy E. Ryan	94,012	36.75%	▼2.68
Libertarian	Helen L. Radder	2,711	1.06%	N/A
Populist	Joseph A. Plonski	2,309	0.90%	N/A
Conservative	Michael S. Permuko	1,728	0.68%	N/A
Independent	James Reilly	915	0.36%	N/A
Independent	William Donald McMahon	901	0.35%	N/A
Independent	Anthony J. Verderese	749	0.29%	N/A
Independent	Martin T. King	593	0.23%	N/A
Independent	Frank Burke	512	0.20%	N/A
Total votes		255,798	100.00%	
Republican hold		Swing	{{{swing}}}	

== District 4 ==
1992 New Jersey's 4th congressional district election
- November 3, 1992
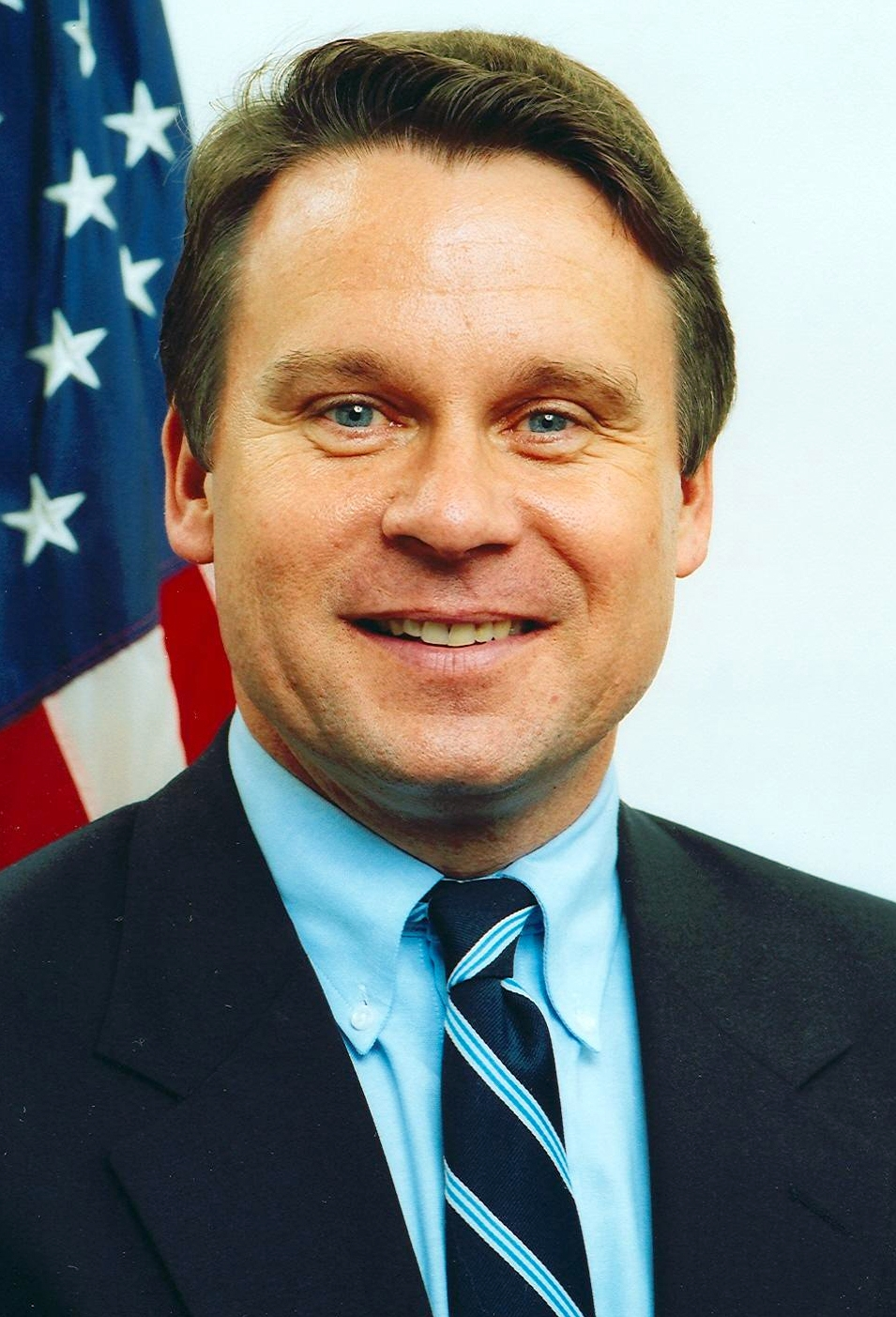

Nominee	Chris Smith	Brian Hughes
Party	Republican	Democratic
Popular vote	109,818	49,537
Percentage	67.9%	30.6%
U.S. Representative before election
Chris Smith
Republican
Elected U.S. Representative
Chris Smith
Republican

Incumbent Republican Chris Smith won. This district, in Central Jersey, consisted of parts of Burlington, Mercer, Monmouth and Ocean counties.

=== Republican primary ===
==== Candidates ====
- Chris Smith, incumbent Representative since 1981

==== Results ====
1992 Republican primary
Party	Candidate	Votes	%
Republican	Chris Smith (incumbent)	19,085	100.00%
Total votes		19,085	100.00%

=== Democratic primary ===
==== Candidates ====
- Michael DiMarco
- Brian M. Hughes, social worker and son of former governor and Supreme Court chief justice Richard J. Hughes

==== Results ====
1992 Democratic primary
Party	Candidate	Votes	%
Democratic	Brian M. Hughes	12,666	81.33%
Democratic	Michael DiMarco	2,907	18.67%
Total votes		15,573	100.00%

=== General election ===
==== Candidates ====
- Benjamin Grindlinger (Libertarian)
- Brian M. Hughes, social worker and son of former governor and Supreme Court chief justice Richard J. Hughes (Democratic)
- Agnes A. James (NJ Conservative)
- Joseph J. Notarangelo (America First Populist)
- Patrick C. Pasculli (Independent)
- Chris Smith, incumbent Representative since 1981 (Republican)

==== Campaign ====
Hughes sought to capitalize on Smith's reputation as a national anti-abortion leader.

==== Results ====
1992 U.S. House election
Party	Candidate	Votes	%	±%
Republican	Chris Smith (incumbent)	149,095	61.81%	▼0.91
Democratic	Brian M. Hughes	84,514	35.04%	▲0.54
Libertarian	Benjamin Grindlinger	2,984	1.24%	▼0.13
Independent	Patrick C. Pasculli	2,137	0.89%	N/A
Conservative	Agnes A. James	1,630	0.68%	N/A
Populist	Joseph J. Notarangelo	865	0.36%	▼0.40
Total votes		241,225	100.00%	
Republican hold		Swing	{{{swing}}}	

== District 5 ==
1992 New Jersey's 5th congressional district election
- November 3, 1992
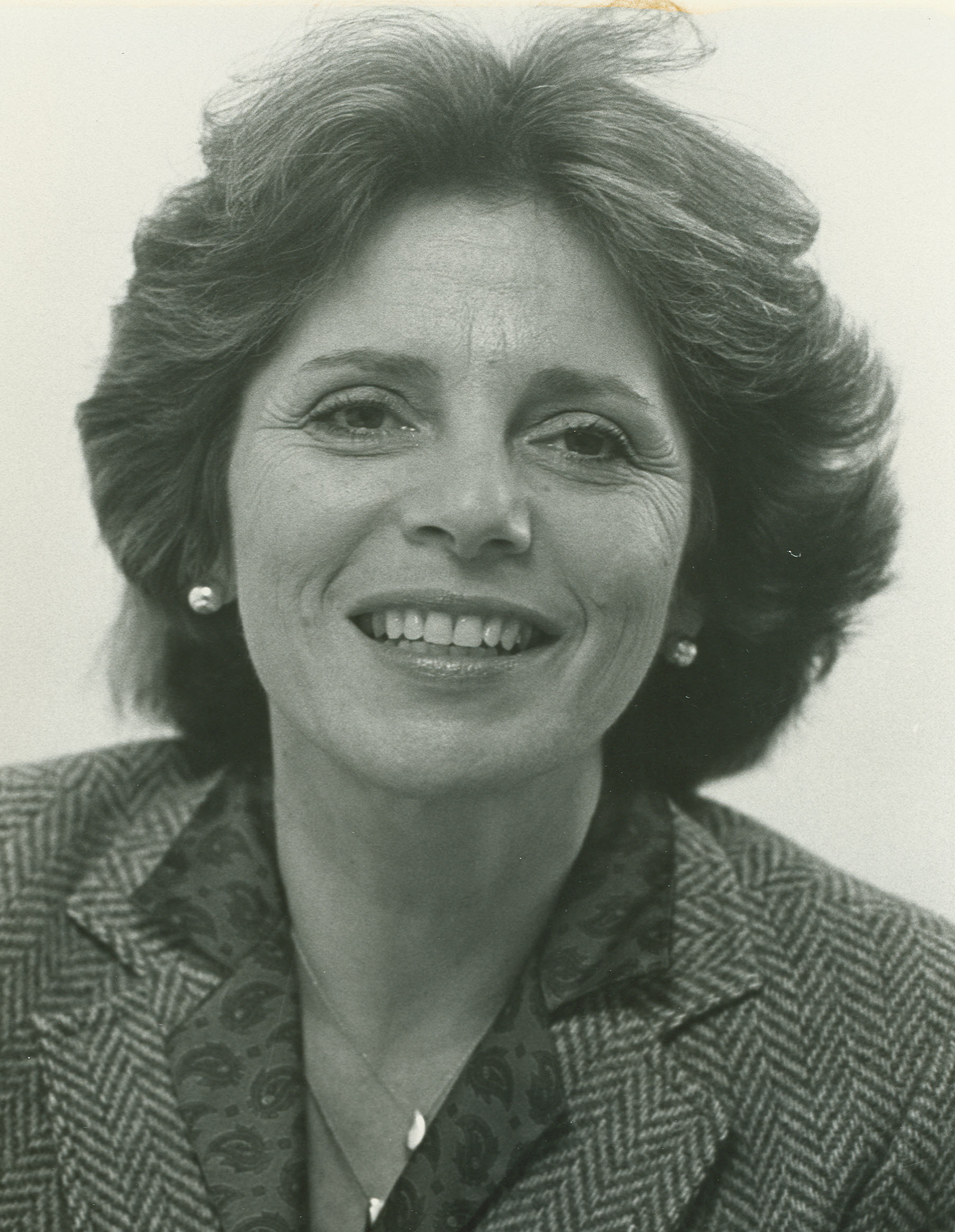

Nominee	Marge Roukema	Frank Lucas
Party	Republican	Democratic
Popular vote	196,198	67,579
Percentage	71.5%	24.6%
U.S. Representative before election
Marge Roukema
Republican
Elected U.S. Representative
Marge Roukema
Republican

Incumbent Marge Roukema won. This district included parts of Bergen, Passaic, and Sussex counties and all of Warren County.

=== Republican primary ===
==== Candidates ====
- C. Larry Fischer
- Ira M. Marlowe
- Marge Roukema, incumbent Representative from Ridgewood since 1981
- Lou Sette

==== Results ====
1992 Republican primary
Party	Candidate	Votes	%
Republican	Marge Roukema (incumbent)	27,030	62.16%
Republican	Lou Sette	10,243	23.56%
Republican	Ira M. Marlowe	4,839	11.13%
Republican	C. Larry Fischer	1,372	3.16%
Total votes		43,484	100.00%

=== Democratic primary ===
==== Candidates ====
- Frank R. Lucas
- John Scully

==== Results ====
1992 Democratic primary
Party	Candidate	Votes	%
Democratic	Frank R. Lucas	13,185	72.18%
Democratic	John Scully	5,081	27.82%
Total votes		18,266	100.00%

=== General election ===
==== Candidates ====
- Stuart Bacha (America First Populist)
- George Lahood (Equality, Brotherhood, Justice)
- William J. Leonard (Independent)
- Michael V. Pierone (Libertarian)
- Marge Roukema, incumbent Representative from Ridgewood since 1981 (Republican)

==== Results ====
1992 U.S. House election
Party	Candidate	Votes	%	±%
Republican	Marge Roukema (incumbent)	196,198	71.51%	▼4.14
Democratic	Frank R. Lucas	67,579	24.63%	▲2.20
Independent	William J. Leonard	6,182	2.25%	N/A
Libertarian	Michael V. Pierone	2,636	0.96%	N/A
Independent	George Lahood	994	0.36%	N/A
Populist	Stuart Bacha	782	0.29%	▼1.63
Total votes		274,371	100.00%	
Republican hold		Swing	{{{swing}}}	

== District 6 ==
1992 New Jersey's 6th congressional district election
- November 3, 1992
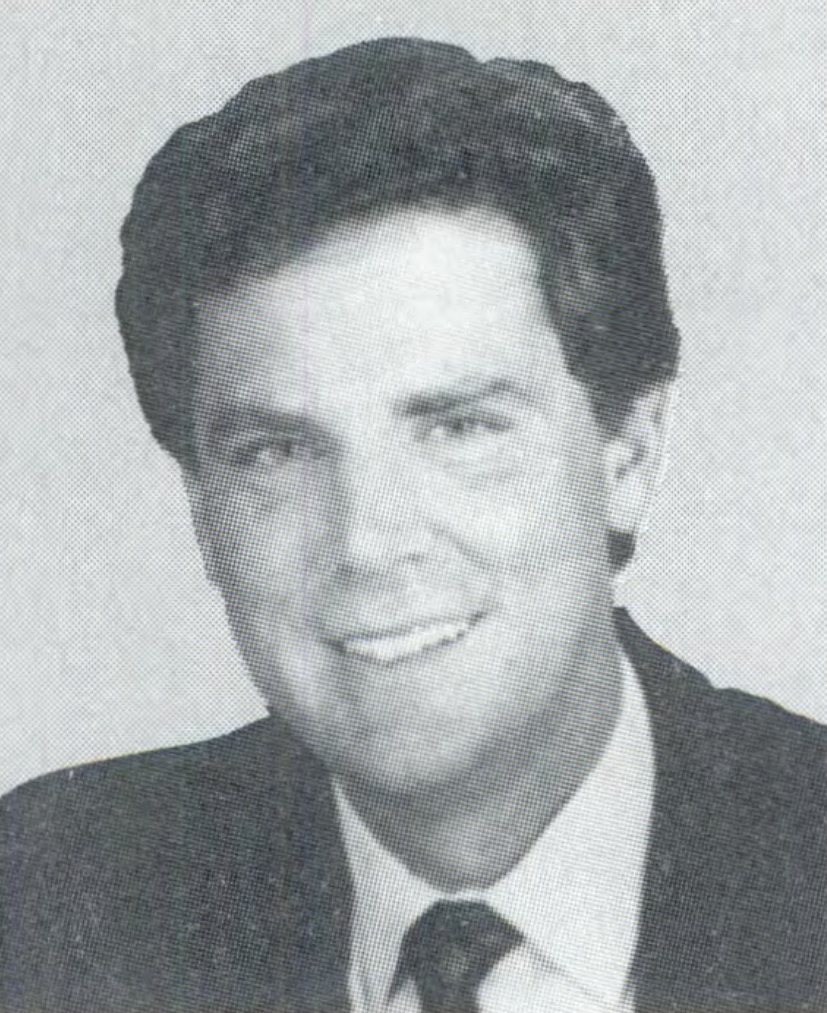

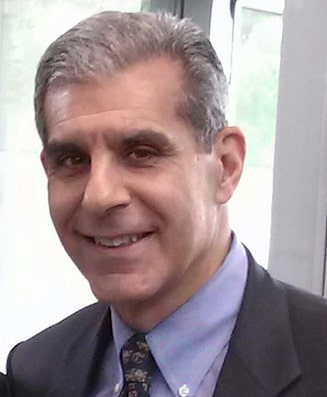
Nominee	Frank Pallone	Joe Kyrillos
Party	Democratic	Republican
Popular vote	118,266	100,949
Percentage	52.3%	44.6%
U.S. Representative before election
Frank Pallone and Bernard J. Dwyer
Democratic
Elected U.S. Representative
Frank Pallone
Democratic

Incumbent Democrat Frank Pallone won; fellow incumbent Bernard J. Dwyer declined to run. This district included parts of Middlesex and Monmouth counties.

=== Democratic primary ===
==== Candidates ====
- Jeffrey R. Gorman, New Brunswick systems analyst
- Barbara Jensen
- Frank Pallone, incumbent Representative from Long Branch since 1988
- Bob Smith, assemblyman and former mayor of Piscataway

===== Declined =====
- Bernard J. Dwyer, incumbent Representative from Edison since 1981

==== Results ====
1992 Democratic primary
Party	Candidate	Votes	%
Democratic	Frank Pallone (incumbent)	19,087	54.62%
Democratic	Bob Smith	12,769	36.56%
Democratic	Barbara Jensen	1,784	5.11%
Democratic	Jeffrey R. Gorman	1,286	3.68%
Total votes		34,926	100.00%

=== Republican primary ===
==== Candidates ====
- Grace C. Applegate, Occupational Safety and Health Administration official and former assistant New Jersey Commissioner of Labor and Workforce Development
- Paul Danielczyk, nominee for this district in 1990
- Joe Kyrillos, state senator from Middletown
- James R. Sheldon

==== Results ====
1992 Republican primary
Party	Candidate	Votes	%
Republican	Joe Kyrillos	8,179	47.46%
Republican	Grace C. Applegate	4,397	25.52%
Republican	Paul Danielczyk	3,986	23.13%
Republican	James R. Sheldon	670	3.89%
Total votes		17,232	100.00%

=== General election ===
==== Candidates ====
- Simone Berg (Socialist Workers)
- Peter Cerrato (Independent for Freedom)
- Charles H. Dickson (Capitalist)
- Joe Kyrillos, state senator from Middletown (Republican)
- Kenneth Matto (America First Populist)
- Frank Pallone, incumbent Representative from Long Branch since 1988 (Democratic)
- George P. Predham (You Gotta Believe)
- Joseph Spalletta (The People's Candidate)
- Bill Stewart (Libertarian)

==== Endorsements ====
Frank Pallone (D)

Newspaper editorial boards

- The New York Times

==== Results ====
1992 U.S. House election
Party	Candidate	Votes	%	±%
Democratic	Frank Pallone Jr. (incumbent)	118,266	52.31%	▲3.23
Republican	Joe Kyrillos	100,949	44.65%	▼1.80
Independent	Joseph Spalletta	2,153	0.95%	N/A
Libertarian	Bill Stewart	1,404	0.62%	▼0.54
Independent	Peter Cerrato	1,073	0.47%	N/A
Independent	George P. Predham	951	0.42%	N/A
Socialist Workers	Simone Berg	613	0.23%	N/A
Populist	Kenneth Matto	411	0.18%	▼0.37
Independent	Charles H. Dickson	273	0.12%	N/A
Total votes		226,093	100.00%	
Democratic hold		Swing	{{{swing}}}	

== District 7 ==
1992 New Jersey's 7th congressional district election
- November 3, 1992
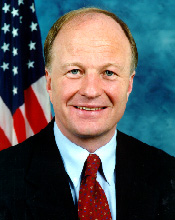

Nominee	Bob Franks	Leonard Sendelsky
Party	Republican	Democratic
Popular vote	132,174	105,761
Percentage	53.3%	42.6%
U.S. Representative before election
Matt Rinaldo
Republican
Elected U.S. Representative
Bob Franks
Republican

Incumbent Matt Rinaldo withdrew from the race after winning renomination, and Republican assemblyman Bob Franks won the open seat. This district included parts of Essex, Middlesex, Somerset, and Union counties.

=== Republican primary ===
==== Candidates ====
- Matt Rinaldo, incumbent Representative from Union since 1973

==== Results ====
1992 Republican primary
Party	Candidate	Votes	%
Republican	Matt Rinaldo (incumbent)	20,261	100.00%
Total votes		20,261	100.00%

Rinaldo withdrew after the primary and was replaced by Bob Franks.

=== Democratic primary ===
==== Candidates ====
- Karen Carroll, Bridgewater activist
- Leonard R. Sendelsky, Woodbridge real estate developer

==== Results ====
1992 Democratic primary
Party	Candidate	Votes	%
Democratic	Leonard R. Sendelsky	9,992	56.75%
Democratic	Karen Carroll	7,615	43.25%
Total votes		7,653	100.00%

=== Republican replacement convention ===
Following Rinaldo's withdrawal in September, Republicans met in a special convention to choose a replacement nominee. Assemblyman Bob Franks defeated Somerset County freeholder Michael Pappas.

==== Candidates ====
- Bob Franks, chair of the New Jersey Republican Party and assemblyman from Summit
- Mike Pappas, Somerset County Freeholder

=== General election ===
==== Candidates ====
- Bill Campbell (No Nonsense Government)
- Kevin Michael Criss (People's Congressional Preference)
- Bob Franks, chair of the New Jersey Republican Party and assemblyman from Summit (Republican)
- Eugene J. Gillespie Jr. (Independent)
- John Kucek (America First Populist)
- Spencer Layman (Libertarian)
- Leonard R. Sendelsky, Woodbridge real estate developer (Democratic)

===== Withdrew =====
- Matt Rinaldo, incumbent Representative from Union since 1973 (Republican)

==== Campaign ====
Rinaldo withdrew from the race just ahead of the September general election filing deadline.

==== Endorsements ====
Leonard Sendelsky (D)

Newspaper editorial boards

- The New York Times

==== Results ====
1992 U.S. House election
Party	Candidate	Votes	%	±%
Republican	Bob Franks	132,174	53.28%	▼21.36
Democratic	Leonard R. Sendelsky	105,761	42.63%	▲19.43
Independent	Eugene J. Gillespie Jr.	4,043	1.63%	N/A
Independent	Bill Campbell	2,612	1.05%	N/A
Libertarian	Spencer Layman	1,964	0.79%	N/A
Populist	John Kucek	844	0.34%	▼1.83
Independent	Kevin Michael Criss	684	0.28%	N/A
Total votes		248,082	100.00%	
Republican hold		Swing	{{{swing}}}	

== District 8 ==
1992 New Jersey's 8th congressional district election
- November 3, 1992
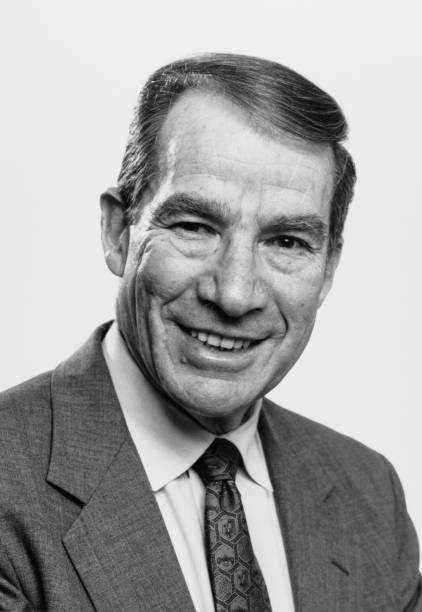

Nominee	Herb Klein	Joseph Bubba	Gloria Kolodziej
Party	Democratic	Republican	Independent Democratic
Popular vote	96,742	84,674	16,170
Percentage	47.0%	41.1%	7.9%
U.S. Representative before election
Robert A. Roe
Democratic
Elected U.S. Representative
Herb Klein
Democratic

Incumbent Robert Roe, the dean of the congressional delegation and a two-time candidate for governor, surprised observers by announcing his retirement. This district included parts of Essex and Passaic counties.

=== Democratic primary ===
==== Candidates ====
- Roger P. Ham
- Joseph C. Iozia
- Herb Klein, former assemblyman from Clifton
- Claire I. Lagermasini, former aide to Hugh Carey and staffer for Eugene McCarthy's 1968 presidential campaign
- Harry McEnroe, assemblyman from South Orange

==== Declined ====
- Richard Codey, state senator from West Orange
- Bill Pascrell, assemblyman and mayor of Paterson
- Robert A. Roe, incumbent Representative from Wayne since 1969

==== Campaign ====
In the Essex County portion of the district, the campaign was connected to an ongoing feud between county party chair Raymond Durkin and county executive Thomas D'Alessio; McEnroe, a late entry to the race, was allied with Durkin.

==== Endorsements ====
Claire Lagermasini

Organizations

- National Organization for Women

Individuals

- Gloria Steinem

==== Results ====
1992 Democratic primary
Party	Candidate	Votes	%
Democratic	Herb Klein	9,456	38.78%
Democratic	Harry A. McEnroe	6,786	27.83%
Democratic	Claire I. Lagermasini	6,510	26.70%
Democratic	Joseph C. Iozia	1,127	4.62%
Democratic	Roger P. Ham	527	2.16%
Total votes		24,381	100.00%

=== Republican primary ===
==== Candidates ====
- Joseph Bubba, state senator from Wayne
- Bob Davis
- Bernard George
- Norman M. Robertson, Passaic County Freeholder and nominee for this district in 1982

==== Results ====
1992 Republican primary
Party	Candidate	Votes	%
Republican	Joseph Bubba	10,584	63.24%
Republican	Norman M. Robertson	4,184	25.00%
Republican	Bob Davis	1,690	10.10%
Republican	Bernard George	278	1.66%
Total votes		16,736	100.00%

=== General election ===
==== Candidates ====
- Joseph Bubba, state senator from Wayne (Republican)
- Thomas Caslander (Independents for Change)
- Rob Dominianni (Restore Public Trust)
- Gregory E. Dzula (America First Populist)
- Neal A. Gorfinkle (New Jersey Independents)
- Herb Klein, incumbent Representative since 1993 (Democratic)
- Gloria Kolodziej, former mayor of Clifton (Independent for Change)
- Carmine O. Pelossie (Independent People's Network)
- Jason Redrup (Socialist Workers)
- Louis M. Stefanelli (Libertarian)

==== Campaign ====
Entering the general election, Bubba was considered the favorite over Klein, who had not held elected office since 1978.

==== Endorsements ====
Herb Klein (D)

Newspaper editorial boards

- The New York Times

==== Results ====
1992 U.S. House election
Party	Candidate	Votes	%	±%
Democratic	Herb Klein (incumbent)	96,742	47.00%	▼29.92
Republican	Joseph Bubba	84,674	41.14%	N/A
Independent	Gloria J. Kolodziej	16,170	7.86%	N/A
Independent	Thomas Caslander	2,916	1.42%	N/A
Independent	Carmine O. Pellosie	2,135	1.04%	N/A
Libertarian	Louis M. Stefanelli	1,109	0.54%	N/A
Independent	Rob Dominianni	1,099	0.53%	N/A
Socialist Workers	Jason Redrup	392	0.19%	N/A
Populist	Gregory E. Dzula	316	0.15%	▼4.86
Independent	Neal A. Gorfinkle	275	0.13%	N/A
Total votes		205,828	100.00%	
Democratic hold		Swing	{{{swing}}}	

== District 9 ==
1992 New Jersey's 9th congressional district election
- November 3, 1992
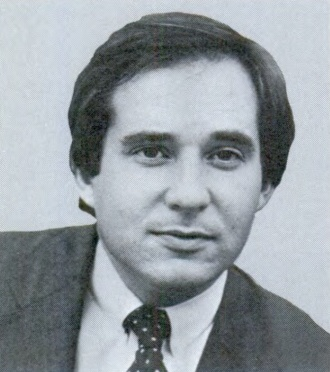

Nominee	Bob Torricelli	Patrick J. Roma
Party	Democratic	Republican
Popular vote	139,188	88,179
Percentage	58.3%	36.9%
U.S. Representative before election
Bob Torricelli
Democratic
Elected U.S. Representative
Bob Torricelli
Democratic

Incumbent Democrat Bob Torricelli won.

=== Democratic primary ===
==== Candidates ====
- Matt Guice
- Nany Harrigan
- Bob Torricelli, incumbent Representative from Englewood since 1983

==== Results ====
1992 Democratic primary
Party	Candidate	Votes	%
Democratic	Robert G. Torricelli (incumbent)	24,010	79.58%
Democratic	Nancy Harrigan	4,733	15.69%
Democratic	Matt Guice	1,429	4.74%
Total votes		30,172	100.00%

=== Republican primary ===
==== Candidates ====
- Patrick J. Roma, assemblyman from Palisades Park

==== Results ====
1992 Republican primary
Party	Candidate	Votes	%
Republican	Patrick J. Roma	12,336	100.00%
Total votes		12,336	100.00%

=== General election ===
==== Candidates ====
- Joseph D'Alessio (America First Populist)
- Shel Haas (An Independent Voice)
- Daniel M. Karlan (Libertarian)
- Gary Novosielski (New Jersey Independents)
- Patrick J. Roma, assemblyman from Palisades Park (Republican)
- Peter J. Russo, former assemblyman from Lyndhurst and candidate for this district in 1990 (Clean Up Congress)
- Herbert Shaw (Politicians are Crooks)
- Bob Torricelli, incumbent Representative from Englewood since 1983 (Democratic)

==== Campaign ====
During the campaign, Roma attacked Torricelli for his implication in the House banking scandal, in which he had personally written 27 overdraft checks, as well as his abuse of Congressional mailing privileges.

==== Results ====
1992 U.S. House election
Party	Candidate	Votes	%	±%
Democratic	Bob Torricelli (incumbent)	139,188	58.31%	▲4.98
Republican	Patrick J. Roma	88,179	36.94%	▼8.07
Independent	Peter J. Russo	4,491	1.88%	N/A
Independent	Gary Novosielski	2,257	0.95%	N/A
Populist	Joseph D'Alessio	1,606	0.67%	▼0.99
Independent	Herbert Shaw	1,369	0.57%	N/A
Libertarian	Daniel M. Karlan	1,099	0.46%	N/A
Independent	Shel Haas	515	0.22%	N/A
Total votes		238,704	100.00%	
Democratic hold		Swing	{{{swing}}}	

== District 10 ==
1992 New Jersey's 10th congressional district election
- November 3, 1992
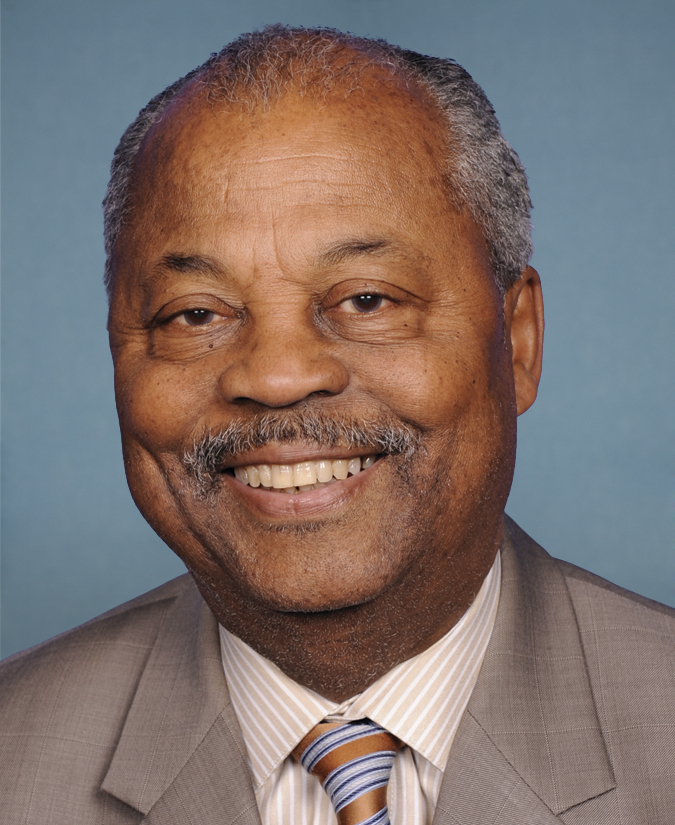

Nominee	Donald M. Payne	Alfred D. Palermo
Party	Democratic	Republican
Popular vote	117,287	30,160
Percentage	78.4%	20.2%
U.S. Representative before election
Donald M. Payne
Democratic
Elected U.S. Representative
Donald M. Payne
Democratic

Incumbent Democrat Donald M. Payne won. The district included parts of Essex, Hudson, and Union counties.

=== Democratic primary ===
==== Candidates ====
- Brian Connors
- Willie L. Flood, former member of the Jersey City Council
- Stanley J. Moskal
- Donald M. Payne, incumbent Representative from Newark since 1989

==== Results ====
1992 Democratic primary
Party	Candidate	Votes	%
Democratic	Donald M. Payne (incumbent)	31,846	73.86%
Democratic	Willie L. Flood	4,167	9.66%
Democratic	Brian Connors	3,601	8.35%
Democratic	Stanley J. Moskal	3,502	8.12%
Total votes		43,116	100.00%

=== Republican primary ===
==== Candidates ====
- Alfred D. Palermo

==== Results ====
1992 Republican primary
Party	Candidate	Votes	%
Republican	Alfred D. Palermo	3,972	100.00%
Total votes		3,972	100.00%

=== General election ===
==== Candidates ====
- Roberto Caraballo (Libertarian)
- William T. Leonard (Socialist Workers)
- Alfred D. Palermo (Republican)
- Donald M. Payne, incumbent Representative from Newark since 1989 (Democratic)

==== Results ====
1992 U.S. House election
Party	Candidate	Votes	%	±%
Democratic	Donald M. Payne (incumbent)	117,287	78.38%	▼3.06
Republican	Alfred D. Palermo	30,160	20.16%	▲2.84
Libertarian	Roberto Caraballo	1,272	0.85%	N/A
Socialist Workers	William T. Leonard	913	0.61%	▼0.63
Total votes		149,632	100.00%	
Democratic hold		Swing	{{{swing}}}	

== District 11 ==
1992 New Jersey's 11th congressional district election
- November 3, 1992
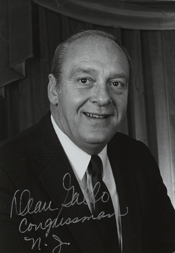

Nominee	Dean Gallo	Ona Spiridellis
Party	Republican	Democratic
Popular vote	188,165	68,871
Percentage	70.1%	25.7%
U.S. Representative before election
Dean Gallo
Republican
Elected U.S. Representative
Dean Gallo
Republican

Incumbent Republican Dean Gallo won. This district consisted of all of Morris County and parts of Essex, Passaic, Somerset, and Sussex counties.

=== Republican primary ===
==== Candidates ====
- Dean Gallo, incumbent Representative since 1985

==== Results ====
1992 Republican primary
Party	Candidate	Votes	%
Republican	Dean Gallo (incumbent)	33,319	100.00%
Total votes		33,319	100.00%

=== Democratic primary ===
==== Candidates ====
- Mary Frueholz
- Ona Spiridellis

==== Results ====
1992 Democratic primary
Party	Candidate	Votes	%
Democratic	Ona Spiridellis	7,237	60.29%
Democratic	Mary Frueholz	4,767	39.71%
Total votes		12,004	100.00%

=== General election ===
==== Candidates ====
- Barry J. Fitzpatrick (Time for Change)
- Dean Gallo, incumbent Representative since 1985 (Republican)
- Richard E. Hrazanek (America First Populist)
- David C. Karlen (Independent)
- Richard S. Roth (Libertarian)
- Howard Safier (Independent)
- Ona Spiridellis (Democratic)

==== Results ====
1992 U.S. House election
Party	Candidate	Votes	%	±%
Republican	Dean Gallo (incumbent)	188,165	70.10%	▲5.60
Democratic	Ona Spiridellis	68,871	25.66%	▼7.34
Libertarian	Richard S. Roth	3,538	1.32%	N/A
Independent	Barry J. Fitzpatrick	3,127	1.16%	N/A
Independent	David C. Karlen	1,882	0.70%	N/A
Independent	Howard Safier	1,711	0.64%	N/A
Populist	Richard E. Hrazanek	1,142	0.43%	▼2.07
Total votes		268,436	100.00%	
Republican hold		Swing	{{{swing}}}	

== District 12 ==
1992 New Jersey's 12th congressional district election
- November 3, 1992
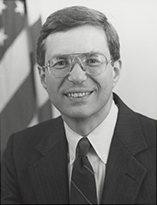

Nominee	Dick Zimmer	Frank Abate
Party	Republican	Democratic
Popular vote	174,216	83,035
Percentage	63.9%	30.4%
U.S. Representative before election
Dick Zimmer
Republican
Elected U.S. Representative
Dick Zimmer
Republican

Incumbent Republican Dick Zimmer won. This district, based in Central Jersey, included all of Hunterdon County and parts of Mercer, Middlesex, Monmouth and Somerset counties.

=== Republican primary ===
==== Candidates ====
- Dick Zimmer, incumbent Representative since 1991

==== Results ====
1992 Republican primary
Party	Candidate	Votes	%
Republican	Dick Zimmer (incumbent)	24,150	100.00%
Total votes		24,150	100.00%

=== Democratic primary ===
==== Candidates ====
- Frank G. Abate

==== Results ====
1992 Democratic primary
Party	Candidate	Votes	%
Democratic	Frank G. Abate	14,216	100.00%
Total votes		14,216	100.00%

=== General election ===
==== Candidates ====
- Frank G. Abate (Democratic)
- Edward F. Eggert (Independent)
- Carl J. Mayer, consumer advocate (Independent)
- Compton C. Pakenham (America First Populist)
- Carl Peters (Libertarian)
- Dick Zimmer, incumbent Representative since 1991 (Republican)

==== Results ====
1992 U.S. House election
Party	Candidate	Votes	%	±%
Republican	Dick Zimmer	174,216	63.87%	▼0.18
Democratic	Frank G. Abate	83,035	30.44%	▼0.59
Independent	Carl J. Mayer	11,051	4.05%	N/A
Libertarian	Carl Peters	1,906	0.70%	N/A
Independent	Edward F. Eggert	1,804	0.66%	N/A
Populist	Compton C. Pakenham	745	0.27%	▼0.57
Total votes		272,757	100.00%	
Republican hold		Swing	{{{swing}}}	

== District 13 ==
1992 New Jersey's 13th congressional district election
- November 3, 1992
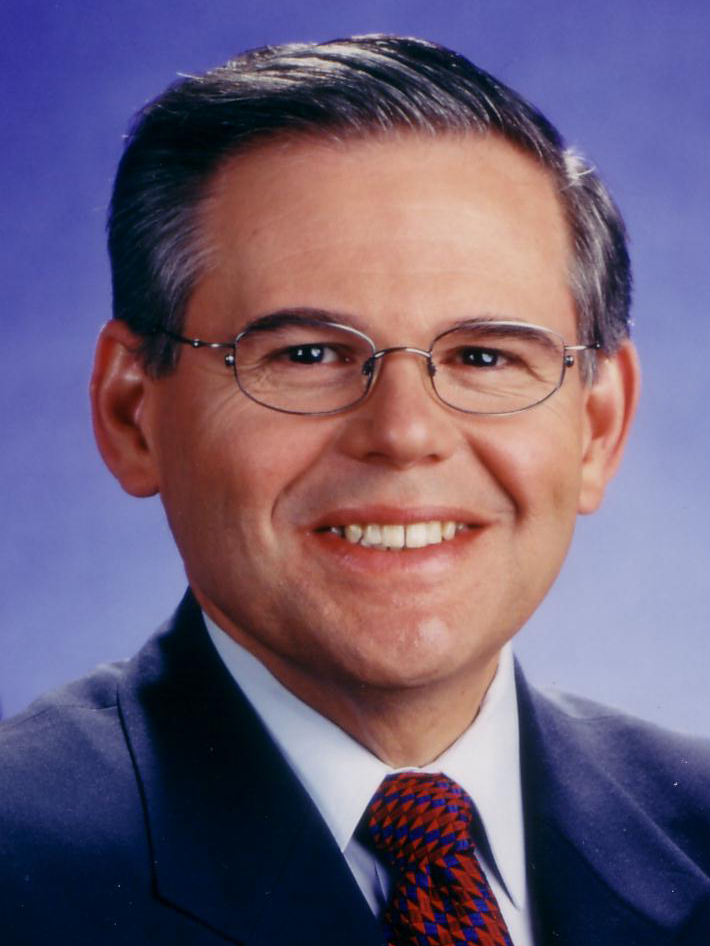

Nominee	Bob Menendez	Fred Theemling Jr.
Party	Democratic	Republican
Popular vote	67,688	24,071
Percentage	64.3%	30.6%
U.S. Representative before election
Frank J. Guarini
Democratic
Elected U.S. Representative
Bob Menendez
Democratic

Incumbent Democrat Frank J. Guarini retired; Bob Menendez won the open seat. This district, previously numbered as the fourteenth district, included parts of Essex, Hudson, Middlesex, and Union counties and was redrawn specifically to provide representation for the area's large Hispanic population. Menendez became the first Hispanic elected to represent New Jersey in Congress.

=== Democratic primary ===
==== Candidates ====
- Robert P. Haney Jr., Jersey City lawyer and candidate for this district in 1988
- Bob Menendez, state senator and mayor of Union City

===== Declined =====
- Frank J. Guarini, incumbent Representative since 1979

==== Campaign ====
Even before Guarini announced his retirement, Menendez was seen as the natural heir to this district. Nevertheless, Robert Haney, who had challenged Guarini in 1988, ran a competitive campaign with support from numerous Jersey City politicians and reformist critics of the declining Hudson County political machine.

==== Endorsements ====
Robert P. Haney Jr.

Local officials

- Marilyn Roman, acting mayor of Jersey City
- Jaime Vazquez, member of the Jersey City Council

Party officials

- Raymond Durkin, chair of the Essex County Democratic Party
- Allen Manzo, chair of the Jersey City Democratic Party
Bob Menendez

State legislators

- Raymond Lesniak, state senator from Elizabeth and chair of the New Jersey Democratic Party

Local officials

- Sharpe James, mayor of Newark
- Robert C. Janiszewski, Hudson County Executive

==== Results ====
1992 Democratic primary
Party	Candidate	Votes	%
Democratic	Bob Menendez	24,245	68.00%
Democratic	Robert P. Haney Jr.	11,409	32.00%
Total votes		35,654	100.00%

=== Republican primary ===
==== Candidates ====
- Fred J. Theemling Jr., former Hudson County assistant prosecutor and candidate for this district in 1988 and 1990

==== Results ====
1992 Republican primary
Party	Candidate	Votes	%
Republican	Fred J. Theemling Jr.	5,416	100.00%
Total votes		5,416	100.00%

=== General election ===
==== Candidates ====
- Joseph D. Bonacci (Stop Tax Increases)
- Jane Harris (Socialist Workers)
- Len Flynn (Libertarian)
- Bob Menendez, state senator and mayor of Union City (Democratic)
- John E. Rummel (Communist)
- Donald K. Stoveken (America First Populist)
- Fred J. Theemling Jr., former Hudson County assistant prosecutor and candidate for this district in 1988 and 1990 (Republican)

==== Campaign ====
Menendez, seeking to become the first Hispanic to represent New Jersey in Congress, waged an aggressive and anxious campaign for the general election. Despite the district's firm Democratic lean, he pointed to the fact that a disproportionate number of the Hispanic residents were not registered to vote and began aggressively reaching out to blue-collar and middle-class voters. He claimed to campaign eighteen hours per day to reach voters in areas where his name was less recognized.

Although Menendez was well-connected within Hudson County and Cuban American political circles, he rejected the label of "insider" and embraced the Bill Clinton presidential campaign, hoping to deliver his Cuban constituents, who were usually Republican, to Clinton in November. Both candidates endorsed a bill by Bob Torricelli to strengthen the United States embargo on Cuba.

Theemling, who had received around 31 percent of the vote in his prior campaigns, ran an active campaign against Menendez, arguing that voters would hold the New Jersey legislature responsible for the state's economic decline and anti-incumbency would redound to his benefit. He favored urban enterprise zones, corporate tax credits for job creation and penalties for layoffs, and President Bush's proposal for school choice. Menendez also proposed tax incentives for new business in areas of high unemployment and improved federal job training programs.

By the end of the election, Menendez estimated that he would spend $200,000 on his campaign.

==== Endorsements ====
Bob Menendez (D)

Newspaper editorial boards

- The New York Times

==== Results ====
1992 U.S. House election
Party	Candidate	Votes	%	±%
Democratic	Bob Menendez (incumbent)	93,670	64.28%	▼1.92
Republican	Fred J. Theemling Jr.	44,529	30.56%	▲0.60
Independent	Joseph D. Bonnaci	2,363	1.62%	N/A
Libertarian	Len Flynn	1,539	1.06%	N/A
Communist	John E. Rummel	1,525	1.05%	N/A
Socialist Workers	Jane Harris	1,406	0.96%	▼0.59
Populist	Donald K. Stoveken	682	0.47%	▼0.12
Total votes		145,714	100.00%	
Democratic hold		Swing	{{{swing}}}	
