= 1997 New Jersey Senate election =

1997 New Jersey Senate elections
- November 4, 1997

All 40 seats in the New Jersey State Senate 21 seats needed for a majority
- Turnout: 56% (▼11pp)

	Majority party	Minority party
Leader	Donald DiFrancesco	John A. Lynch Jr. (retired)
Party	Republican	Democratic
Leader since	January 14, 1992	January 9, 1990
Leader's seat	22nd (Warren Township)	17th (New Brunsick)
Last election	24	16
Seats won	24	16
Seat change	Steady	Steady
- Results by district Democratic hold Democratic gain Republican hold Republican gain
Senate President before election
Donald DiFrancesco
Republican
Elected Senate President
Donald DiFrancesco
Republican

The 1993 New Jersey Senate election was held on November 4.

The election took place alongside Christine Todd Whitman's re-election as Governor over Senator Jim McGreevey. Republicans defended the large majority they gained in the 1991 landslide elections.

Four seats changed hands with no impact on the overall balance of power. Republicans Anthony R. Bucco and Diane Allen unseated incumbent Gordon MacInnes in the 25th district and gained the seat of retiring Senator Jack Casey in the 7th, respectively. Democrats Shirley Turner and Garry Furnari unseated incumbent Republicans Dick LaRossa in the 15th and John P. Scott in the 36th, respectively. One Senator, Republican Joseph Bubba, lost a primary. His challenger, Norman M. Robertson, held the 34th district for the Republicans. This remains the last time that Republicans won a Senate majority.

Contents
Incumbents not running • Summary of results
By District: 1 • 2 • 3 • 4 • 5 • 6 • 7 • 8 • 9 • 10 • 11 • 12 • 13 • 14 • 15 • 16 • 17 • 18 • 19 • 20 • 21 • 22 • 23 • 24 • 25 • 26 • 27 • 28 • 29 • 30 • 31 • 32 • 33 • 34 • 35 • 36 • 37 • 38 • 39 • 40

== Incumbents not running for re-election ==
=== Democratic ===
- Jack Casey (District 7)
- Jim McGreevey (District 17) (ran for Governor)

=== Republican ===
- John H. Ewing (District 16)

== Summary of results by State Senate district ==
District	Incumbent	Party	Elected Senator	Party
1st Legislative District	James Cafiero	Rep	James Cafiero	Rep
2nd Legislative District	William Gormley	Rep	William Gormley	Rep
3rd Legislative District	Raymond Zane	Dem	Raymond Zane	Dem
4th Legislative District	John Matheussen	Rep	John Matheussen	Rep
5th Legislative District	Wayne R. Bryant (Note: Bryant was appointed to complete the unexpired term of Senator Walter Rand, who died on January 6, 1995.)	Dem	Wayne R. Bryant	Dem
6th Legislative District	John Adler	Dem	John Adler	Dem
7th Legislative District	Jack Casey	Dem	Diane Allen	Rep
8th Legislative District	Martha W. Bark (Note: Bark was appointed to complete the unexpired term of Senator C. William Haines, who died on December 18, 1996.)	Rep	Martha W. Bark	Rep
9th Legislative District	Leonard T. Connors	Rep	Leonard T. Connors	Rep
10th Legislative District	Andrew R. Ciesla	Rep	Andrew R. Ciesla	Rep
11th Legislative District	Joseph A. Palaia	Rep	Joseph A. Palaia	Rep
12th Legislative District	John O. Bennett	Rep	John O. Bennett	Rep
13th Legislative District	Joe Kyrillos	Rep	Joe Kyrillos	Rep
14th Legislative District	Peter Inverso	Rep	Peter Inverso	Rep
15th Legislative District	Dick LaRossa	Rep	Shirley Turner	Dem
16th Legislative District	John H. Ewing	Rep	Walter J. Kavanaugh	Rep
17th Legislative District	John A. Lynch Jr.	Dem	John A. Lynch Jr.	Dem
18th Legislative District	Jack Sinagra	Rep	Jack Sinagra	Rep
19th Legislative District	Jim McGreevey	Dem	Joe Vitale	Dem
20th Legislative District	Raymond Lesniak	Dem	Raymond Lesniak	Dem
21st Legislative District	C. Louis Bassano	Rep	C. Louis Bassano	Rep
22nd Legislative District	Donald DiFrancesco	Rep	Donald DiFrancesco	Rep
23rd Legislative District	William E. Schluter	Rep	William E. Schluter	Rep
24th Legislative District	Robert Littell	Rep	Robert Littell	Rep
25th Legislative District	Gordon MacInnes	Dem	Anthony Bucco	Rep
26th Legislative District	Robert Martin	Rep	Robert Martin	Rep
27th Legislative District	Richard Codey	Dem	Richard Codey	Dem
28th Legislative District	Ronald Rice	Dem	Ronald Rice	Dem
29th Legislative District	Wynona Lipman	Dem	Wynona Lipman	Dem
30th Legislative District	Robert W. Singer	Rep	Robert W. Singer	Rep
31st Legislative District	Edward T. O'Connor Jr.	Dem	Edward T. O'Connor Jr.	Dem
32nd Legislative District	Nicholas Sacco	Dem	Nicholas Sacco	Dem
33rd Legislative District	Bernard Kenny	Dem	Bernard Kenny	Dem
34th Legislative District	Joseph Bubba	Rep	Norman M. Robertson	Rep
35th Legislative District	John Girgenti	Dem	John Girgenti	Dem
36th Legislative District	John P. Scott	Rep	Garry Furnari	Dem
37th Legislative District	Byron Baer	Dem	Byron Baer	Dem
38th Legislative District	Louis F. Kosco	Rep	Louis F. Kosco	Rep
39th Legislative District	Gerald Cardinale	Rep	Gerald Cardinale	Rep
40th Legislative District	Henry McNamara	Rep	Henry McNamara	Rep

=== Close races ===
Seats where the margin of victory was under 10%:

1. Legislative District 4, 4.6%
2. Legislative District 6, 8.0%
3. Legislative District 7, 9.3% gain
4. Legislative District 8, 9.8%
5. Legislative District 15, 7.8% gain
6. Legislative District 36, 6.2% gain

== District 1 ==
1997 general election
Party	Candidate	Votes	%	±%
Republican	James Cafiero (incumbent)	35,573	60.8%	▼1.2
Democratic	John Rauh	21,340	36.5%	Steady
Conservative	Geraldine Caiafa	1,579	2.7%	N/A
Total votes		58,492	100.00%	

== District 2 ==
1997 general election
Party	Candidate	Votes	%	±%
Republican	William Gormley (incumbent)	34,814	65.2%	▲3.6
Democratic	John R. Piatt	18,569	34.8%	▼3.6
Total votes		53,383	100.00%	

== District 3 ==
1997 general election
Party	Candidate	Votes	%	±%
Democratic	Raymond Zane (incumbent)	46,551	84.5%	▲16.9
Conservative	Mary A. Whittam	8,121	14.7%	N/A
Republican	N/A	415	0.8%	▼31.6
Total votes		55,087	100.00%	

== District 4 ==
1997 general election
Party	Candidate	Votes	%	±%
Republican	John J. Matheussen (incumbent)	29,429	50.7%	▼3.6
Democratic	Sean F. Dalton	26,780	46.1%	▲0.4
Conservative	Jim Barber	1,872	3.2%	N/A
Total votes		58,081	100.00%	

== District 5 ==
1997 general election
Party	Candidate	Votes	%	±%
Democratic	Wayne R. Bryant (incumbent)	29,809	71.9	▲3.1
Republican	Mel Suplee	11,624	28.1	▼3.1
Total votes		41,433	100.00%	

== District 6 ==
1997 general election
Party	Candidate	Votes	%	±%
Democratic	John Adler (incumbent)	34,073	53.0%	▼6.8
Republican	John A. Rocco	28,938	45.0%	▲4.8
Conservative	Kenneth L. Mayo	1,257	2.0%	N/A
Total votes		64,268	100.00%	

== District 7 ==
1997 general election
Party	Candidate	Votes	%	±%
Republican	Diane Allen	30,875	53.7	▲5.5
Democratic	Robert P. Broderick	25,501	44.4	▼6.0
Conservative	Norman E. Wahner	1,121	1.9	N/A
Total votes		57,497	100.00%	

== District 8 ==
1997 general election
Party	Candidate	Votes	%	±%
Republican	Martha W. Bark (incumbent)	34,597	54.9	▼6.1
Democratic	Marie Hall	28,401	45.1	▲6.1
Total votes		62,998	100.00%	

== District 9 ==
1997 general election
Party	Candidate	Votes	%	±%
Republican	Leonard T. Connors (incumbent)	45,880	60.0	▼5.2
Democratic	Bill Zimmermann, Jr.	28,508	37.3	▲2.5
Conservative	Leonard P. Marshall	2,139	2.8	N/A
Total votes		76,527	100.00%	

== District 10 ==
1997 general election
Party	Candidate	Votes	%	±%
Republican	Andrew R. Ciesla (incumbent)	41,409	60.6	▼1.1
Democratic	Judith G. Leone	24,217	35.5	▼0.3
Libertarian	Steve Nagle	1,381	2.0	N/A
Conservative	Agnes A. James	1,015	1.5	▼1.0
Green	Edith Gbur	278	0.4	N/A
Total votes		68,300	100.00%	

== District 11 ==
1997 general election
Party	Candidate	Votes	%	±%
Republican	Joseph A. Palaia (incumbent)	39,579	66.2	▲0.6
Democratic	Eugene M. LaVergne	18,981	31.7	▲0.8
Conservative	Christian P. Olsen	1,228	2.1	0.0
Total votes		59,788	100.00%	

== District 12 ==
1997 general election
Party	Candidate	Votes	%	±%
Republican	John O. Bennett (incumbent)	41,171	62.8	▼2.2
Democratic	George E. Ball	20,289	30.9	▼0.4
Conservative	John P. Desmond	2,780	4.2	▲1.8
Natural Law	Mary Jo Christian	1,354	2.1	N/A
Total votes		65,594	100.00%	

== District 13 ==
1997 general election
Party	Candidate	Votes	%	±%
Republican	Joe Kyrillos (incumbent)	36,047	63.2	▼0.8
Democratic	Mike Caffrey	19,733	34.6	▼1.4
Conservative	Jerome Bowe	1,299	2.3	N/A
Total votes		57,079	100.00%	

== District 14 ==
1997 general election
Party	Candidate	Votes	%	±%
Republican	Peter Inverso (incumbent)	38,195	55.3	▼4.5
Democratic	Gilbert W. Lugossy	28,866	41.8	▲1.6
Conservative	Joseph Fabrizi	1,997	2.9	N/A
Total votes		69,058	100.00%	

== District 15 ==
1997 general election
Party	Candidate	Votes	%	±%
Democratic	Shirley Turner	29,995	53.9	▲6.2
Republican	Dick LaRossa (incumbent)	25,630	46.1	▼6.2
Total votes		55,625	100.00%	

== District 16 ==
1997 general election
Party	Candidate	Votes	%	±%
Republican	Walter J. Kavanaugh	44,171	63.8	▲2.2
Democratic	Mitchell E. Ignatoff	22,545	32.6	▼5.8
Conservative	Richard C. Martin	2,541	3.7	N/A
Total votes		69,257	100.00%	

== District 17 ==
1997 general election
Party	Candidate	Votes	%	±%
Democratic	John A. Lynch Jr. (incumbent)	27,748	68.0	▲11.3
Republican	Timothy J. O’Brien	13,061	32.0	▼2.2
Total votes		40,809	100.00%	

== District 18 ==
1997 general election
Party	Candidate	Votes	%	±%
Republican	Jack Sinagra (incumbent)	35,400	58.5	▲0.3
Democratic	Thomas H. Paterniti	25,110	41.5	▲1.7
Total votes		60,510	100.00%	

== District 19 ==
1997 general election
Party	Candidate	Votes	%	±%
Democratic	Joe Vitale	32,454	60.2	▲12.6
Republican	Stephen A. Mikulak	21,445	39.8	▼5.3
Total votes		53,899	100.00%	

== District 20 ==
1997 general election
Party	Candidate	Votes	%	±%
Democratic	Raymond Lesniak (incumbent)	26,699	69.1	▲9.2
Republican	Gene Andre	11,928	30.9	▼9.2
Total votes		38,627	100.00%	

== District 21 ==
1997 general election
Party	Candidate	Votes	%	±%
Republican	C. Louis Bassano (incumbent)	43,997	100.00%	▲35.7
Total votes		43,997	100.00%	

== District 22 ==
1997 general election
Party	Candidate	Votes	%	±%
Republican	Donald DiFrancesco (incumbent)	46,249	67.0	▼2.2
Democratic	Margaret Ault	20,962	30.4	▼0.4
Conservative	Frank J. Festa, Jr.	1,778	2.6	N/A
Total votes		68,989	100.00%	

== District 23 ==
1997 general election
Party	Candidate	Votes	%	±%
Republican	William E. Schluter (incumbent)	42,221	61.3	▼30.4
Democratic	Austin “Ken” Kutscher, M.D.	23,094	33.5	N/A
Conservative	Michael P. Kelly	2,770	4.0	N/A
Independent	Daniel Z. Seyler	762	1.1	N/A
Total votes		68,847	100.00%	

== District 24 ==
1997 general election
Party	Candidate	Votes	%	±%
Republican	Robert Littell (incumbent)	44,342	73.0	▼10.3
Democratic	John G. Wingler	13,551	22.3	N/A
Conservative	Ron Pondiscio	2,868	4.7	N/A
Total votes		60,761	100.00%	

== District 25 ==
1997 general election
Party	Candidate	Votes	%	±%
Republican	Anthony R. Bucco	37,048	54.8	▲5.1
Democratic	Gordon MacInnes (incumbent)	29,515	43.7	▼6.6
Conservative	Joseph Long	1,033	1.5	N/A
Total votes		67,596	100.00%	

== District 26 ==
1997 general election
Party	Candidate	Votes	%	±%
Republican	Robert Martin (incumbent)	43,994	92.6	▲23.2
Conservative	Virginia P. Bauer	3,505	7.4	N/A
Total votes		47,499	100.00%	

== District 27 ==
1997 general election
Party	Candidate	Votes	%	±%
Democratic	Richard Codey (incumbent)	35,770	79.5	▲4.4
Republican	Richard R. Klattenberg	9,250	20.5	▼4.4
Total votes		45,020	100.00%	

== District 28 ==
1997 general election
Party	Candidate	Votes	%	±%
Democratic	Ronald Rice (incumbent)	31,069	100.00%	0.0
Total votes		31,069	100.00%	

== District 29 ==
1997 general election
Party	Candidate	Votes	%	±%
Democratic	Wynona Lipman (incumbent)	27,480	86.7	▼13.3
Republican	Elaine L. Guarino	4,226	13.3	N/A
Total votes		31,706	100.00%	

== District 30 ==
1997 general election
Party	Candidate	Votes	%	±%
Republican	Robert Singer (incumbent)	27,837	53.7	▼12.0
Democratic	Kenneth A. Kurtz	20,815	40.2	▲5.9
Libertarian	Bob Mondgock	1,932	3.7	N/A
Conservative	Fred Rasiewicz	1,208	2.3	N/A
Total votes		51,792	100.00%	

== District 31 ==
1997 general election
Party	Candidate	Votes	%	±%
Democratic	Edward T. O'Connor Jr. (incumbent)	30,993	77.6	▲9.2
Republican	Richard Freda	8,935	22.4	▼9.2
Total votes		39,928	100.00%	

== District 32 ==
1997 general election
Party	Candidate	Votes	%	±%
Democratic	Nicholas Sacco (incumbent)	29,386	66.7	▲7.4
Republican	John Pluchino	12,541	28.5	▼8.2
Politicians Are Crooks	Herbert H. Shaw	1,569	3.6	▲0.8
Conservative	Pat Armstrong	532	1.2	0.0
Total votes		44,028	100.00%	

== District 33 ==
1997 general election
Party	Candidate	Votes	%	±%
Democratic	Bernard Kenny (incumbent)	27,914	72.6%	▲9.3
Republican	Gerald Spike	10,517	27.4%	▼8.2
Total votes		38,431	100.00%	

== District 34 ==
=== Republican primary ===
1997 Republican primary
Party	Candidate	Votes	%
Republican	Norman M. Robertson	6,203	66.0%
Republican	Joseph Bubba (incumbent)	3,202	34.0%
Total votes		56,451	100.00%

=== General election ===
1997 general election
Party	Candidate	Votes	%	±%
Republican	Norman M. Robertson	30,450	53.9%	▲1.6
Democratic	Joan Waks	26,001	46.1%	▼1.6
Total votes		56,451	100.00%	

== District 35 ==
1997 general election
Party	Candidate	Votes	%	±%
Democratic	John Girgenti (incumbent)	24,552	69.8	▲3.3
Republican	Brian A. Duncan	10,644	30.2	▼1.9
Total votes		35,196	100.00%	

== District 36 ==
1997 general election
Party	Candidate	Votes	%	±%
Democratic	Garry Furnari	25,844	53.1%	▲6.0
Republican	John P. Scott (incumbent)	22,806	46.9%	▼6.0
Total votes		48,650	100.00%	

== District 37 ==
1997 general election
Party	Candidate	Votes	%	±%
Democratic	Byron Baer (incumbent)	30,844	59.0	▼1.5
Republican	Steve Lonegan	20,543	39.3	▲1.7
Natural Law	Helen Hamilton	855	1.6	N/A
Total votes		52,242	100.00%	

== District 38 ==
1997 general election
Party	Candidate	Votes	%	±%
Republican	Louis F. Kosco (incumbent)	30,538	55.2%	▼8.1
Democratic	Valerie Huttle	23,350	42.2%	▲5.5
Conservative	Denise A. Richardson	1,390	2.5%	N/A
Total votes		55,278	100.00%	

== District 39 ==
1997 general election
Party	Candidate	Votes	%	±%
Republican	Gerald Cardinale (incumbent)	46,424	66.3	▲3.8
Democratic	Ilan Plawker	22,466	32.1	▼5.4
Conservative	Michael W. Koontz	1,166	1.7	N/A
Total votes		70,056	100.00%	

== District 40 ==
1997 general election
Party	Candidate	Votes	%	±%
Republican	Henry McNamara (incumbent)	42,751	67.5%	▼0.2
Democratic	Michael Greenspan	20,537	32.5%	▲0.2
Total votes		63,288	100.00%	

== See also ==
- 1997 New Jersey General Assembly election
