= Joseph Hirkala =

American politician (1923–1987)

- Hirkala in 1981

President pro tempore of the New Jersey Senate
- In office January 10, 1984 – 1986
- Preceded by: Matthew Feldman
- Succeeded by: Carmen A. Orechio

Member of the New Jersey Senate
- In office January 11, 1972 – January 1, 1987
- Succeeded by: Gabriel M. Ambrosio
- Constituency: 14th district (1972–1974); 34th district (1974–1982); 36th district (1982–1987)

Member of the New Jersey General Assembly
- In office 1968 – January 11, 1972
- Constituency: District 14A (1968–1970); District 14B (1970–1972)

Personal details
- Born: November 16, 1923 Passaic, New Jersey, U.S.
- Died: January 1, 1987 (aged 63) Passaic, New Jersey, U.S.
- Party: Democratic
- Spouse: Josephine Chorazy
- Children: 2

Military service
- Allegiance: United States
- Branch/service: United States Navy
- Years of service: 1940-1945

Joseph Hirkala (November 16, 1923 – January 1, 1987) was an American politician who served in the New Jersey General Assembly from 1968 to 1972 and New Jersey State Senate from 1972 until 1987, as a member of the Democratic Party. He was also heavily active in the local politics of Passaic, New Jersey.

Hirkala was born in Passaic and dropped out of high school to join the United States Navy. He became a clerk for Passaic's tax collector in 1948, and held a multitude of local offices before retiring as city clerk in 1986. He served as chair of the Passaic County Democratic Party from 1972 to 1973.

Hirkala was elected to the state legislature in 1967, and served until his death. He served as assistant minority and majority leader, whip, majority leader, and president pro tempore during his tenure.

== Early life and education ==
Joseph Hirkala was born in Passaic, New Jersey, on November 16, 1923, to Julia and Andrew Hirkala. His family was of Slovak Americans descent. He married Josephine Chorazy, with whom he had two children, on February 9, 1952.

Hirkala dropped out of Passaic High School at the age of 17 in order to join the United States Navy on November 26, 1940. He conducted his training in Rhode Island and San Diego, California. He worked as a signalman and received the Philippine Liberation Medal before being discharged on December 1, 1945. He suffered a disability as a result of his service and was hospitalized for over 13 months.

== Career ==
=== Local politics ===
Hirkala was elected as a Republican Passaic county committeeman from the 4th ward in 1948. He ran for commissioner in 1963 with Leonard Simon as his campaign manager, and placed seventh.

Hirkala was appointed as a clerk in the Passaic tax collector's office on April 26, 1948, and assistant city clerk on November 17, 1951. He became assistant city clerk of Clifton, New Jersey, on May 2, 1960, but resigned on June 24, and returned to his post as assistant city clerk of Passaic citing his "sentimental attachment" to Passaic. He was appointed as acting registrar of vital statistics on March 2, 1965. He became acting city manager on March 3, 1971, after Paul McCauley was removed by a city council vote of 5 to 2 and served for one day before Albert R. Galik was appointed.

Anthony Martini, who served as city clerk of Passaic for 28 years, left office on January 1, 1977, and was replaced by Hirkala. He stated in 1984 that he would retire as clerk within the next two years and was succeeded by assistant clerk Sabatina Fiorellino on January 1, 1986.

=== Party politics ===
Hirkala supported Paul L. Troast during the 1953 gubernatorial election and Robert A. Roe in the 1969 election. He worked as Roe's campaign manager during the 1970 U.S. House election. He endorsed J. Edward Crabiel for the Democratic nomination during the 1973 gubernatorial election, but stated that he would have endorsed Roe had he ran. He endorsed Brendan Byrne after Crabiel withdrew. He endorsed Roe during the 1977 gubernatorial election.

Anthony J. Grossi, chair of the Passaic County Democratic Party since 1959, retired on June 7, 1972, and Hirkala was selected by acclamation to succeed him on June 13. He supported removing Thomas Eagleton from the Democratic ticket during the 1972 presidential election due to allegations that Eagleton had been arrested for drunk driving in the past. Hirkala declined to seek reelection as chair in 1973, and Grossi was elected to succeed him on June 12.

=== Legislature ===
==== Elections ====
In 1967, Hirkala ran for a seat in the New Jersey General Assembly from district 14A as the Democratic nominee. Simon was his campaign manager. He defeated Republican nominee Mervyn Montgomery. For the 1969 election, he was redistricted into the two-member district 14B and was elected alongside Republican nominee Joseph F. Scancarella.

Hirkala ran for one of three seats in the New Jersey Senate from the 14th district in the 1971 election. Hirkala, William J. Bate, and Joseph A. Lazzara were the Democratic nominees and all three won in the general election. He was redistricted into the single-member 34th district and defeated Republican nominee Louise Friedman in the 1973 election. He defeated Republican nominee Herman Schmidt in the 1977 election. He was redistricted into the 36th district for the 1981 election and defeated Republican nominee Philip Gervato. He defeated Republican nominee Joseph Job in the 1983 election after spending $129,176 (equivalent to $457,459 in 2025) compared to Job's $102,086 (equivalent to $361,523 in 2025).

==== Tenure ====
During Hirkala's tenure in the general assembly he served on the Labor committee. During his tenure in the state senate, he served on the State Government and Federal and Interstate Relations committee, was vice-chair of the Energy and Environment committee, and chaired the Institutions, Health and Welfare committee.

Hirkala was selected as assistant minority leader in 1972 after being nominated by Bate and Majority Whip in 1973. The Democrats selected three assistant majority leaders in 1975, with Hirkala selected to serve alongside Joseph A. Maressa and Joseph McGahn. Majority Leader Steven P. Perskie resigned on June 17, 1982, as he was being appointed as a superior court judge and Hirkala was selected to replace him. In 1983, he was selected to replace Matthew Feldman as president pro tempore.

In 1975, Senator John J. Fay Jr. accused Hirkala of improper conduct by delaying a bill that would create a legislative commission to study allegations in the nursing home industry. He stated that two of Hirkala's unpaid advisers were nursing home operators. Hirkala requested an investigation into himself and Matthew Boylan, the director of criminal justice, determined that no improper conduct was discovered.

Hirkala underwent surgery to remove his kidney in 1978. In 1985, he announced that he would not seek reelection in 1987 due to poor health. He was hospitalized on July 14, 1986, to treat phlebitis. He announced that he would seek reelection on November 23, but died of a heart attack on January 1, 1987. He was the third state senator, after John P. Caufield and Walter E. Foran, to die in office within the previous year. Gabriel M. Ambrosio won the special election to fill the vacancy created by Hirkala's death.

== Political positions ==
Hirkala opposed the use of desegregation busing. He and Augustus Capers proposed an amendment to the Constitution of New Jersey to lower the voting age to 18 in 1968. He supported legislation to freeze the price of tuition at state colleges. He voted in favor of restoring capital punishment in 1972 and 1980. He opposed efforts to abolish the New Jersey State Commission of Investigation in 1975. He voted in favor of legislation to remove the blue laws for the six Sundays before Christmas.

Hirkala supported an amendment to the state constitution to prohibit an income tax. He called for Treasurer Richard Leone to resign on June 25, 1975, stating that he was responsible for New Jersey's poor financial status and his support for an income tax. He voted against raising the sales tax by 1% in 1982. In 1983, he voted in favor of raising the income tax on those earning more than $50,000 a year by 1%. In 1982, he authored legislation that regulated ticket resale, with public facilities requiring licensed ticket sellers.

Hirkala wrote a resolution honoring József Mindszenty following his death. He opposed President Jimmy Carter returning the Holy Crown of Hungary to Hungary, citing its human rights record.

== Electoral history ==
1967 New Jersey General Assembly district 14A election
Primary election
Party	Candidate	Votes	%
Democratic	Joseph Hirkala	2,102	100.00%
Total votes		2,102	100.00%
General election
Democratic	Joseph Hirkala	18,730	50.93%
Republican	Mervyn Montgomery	18,044	49.07%
Total votes		36,774	100.00%

1969 New Jersey General Assembly district 14B election
Primary election
Party	Candidate	Votes	%
Democratic	Joseph Hirkala (incumbent)	7,228	50.85%
Democratic	Robert J. Jablonski	6,986	49.15%
Total votes		14,214	100.00%
General election
Democratic	Joseph Hirkala (incumbent)	41,671	26.95%
Republican	Joseph F. Scancarella	41,301	26.71%
Republican	Joseph J. Bender	35,375	22.88%
Democratic	Robert J. Jablonski	34,806	22.51%
Independent	James P. Raftery	1,490	0.96%
Total votes		154,643	100.00%

1971 New Jersey Senate 14th district election
Primary election
Party	Candidate	Votes	%
Democratic	Joseph Hirkala	7,454	33.78%
Democratic	William J. Bate	7,366	33.38%
Democratic	Joseph A. Lazzara	7,249	32.85%
Total votes		22,069	100.00%
General election
Democratic	Joseph Hirkala	64,725	21.16%
Democratic	Joseph A. Lazzara	54,426	17.79%
Democratic	William J. Bate	54,149	17.70%
Republican	Alfred Fontanella	46,478	15.20%
Republican	Thomas W.E. Bowdler	39,545	12.93%
Republican	Henry Fette	39,406	12.88%
Socialist Labor	Robert Clement	3,645	1.19%
Socialist Labor	Josephine Clement	3,485	1.14%
Total votes		305,859	100.00%

1973 New Jersey Senate 34th district election
Primary election
Party	Candidate	Votes	%
Democratic	Joseph Hirkala (incumbent)	5,605	100.00%
Total votes		5,605	100.00%
General election
Democratic	Joseph Hirkala (incumbent)	33,047	63.88%
Republican	Louise Friedman	18,682	36.12%
Total votes		51,729	100.00%

1977 New Jersey Senate 34th district election
Primary election
Party	Candidate	Votes	%
Democratic	Joseph Hirkala (incumbent)	12,412	100.00%
Total votes		12,412	100.00%
General election
Democratic	Joseph Hirkala (incumbent)	28,628	69.63%
Republican	Herman Schmidt	12,484	30.37%
Total votes		41,112	100.00%

1981 New Jersey Senate 36th district election
Primary election
Party	Candidate	Votes	%
Democratic	Joseph Hirkala (incumbent)	7,915	80.52%
Democratic	Michael Carlucci	1,915	19.48%
Total votes		9,830	100.00%
General election
Democratic	Joseph Hirkala (incumbent)	30,422	55.45%
Republican	Philip Gervato	23,049	42.01%
Bergen Home Rule	Edna Perrotta	1,395	2.54%
Total votes		54,866	100.00%

1983 New Jersey Senate 36th district election
Primary election
Party	Candidate	Votes	%
Democratic	Joseph Hirkala (incumbent)	4,397	100.00%
Total votes		4,397	100.00%
General election
Democratic	Joseph Hirkala (incumbent)	28,325	58.35%
Republican	Joseph Job	20,222	41.65%
Total votes		48,547	100.00%

== Works cited ==
- Bershad, Lawrence; Ensor, Richard (1985). Ticket Scalping Legislation - A New Jersey Case Study. Seton Hall Legislative Journal.
- Results of the Primary Election Held September 12, 1967 (PDF). Secretary of State of New Jersey. 1967.
- Results of the General Election Held November 7, 1967 (PDF). Secretary of State of New Jersey. 1967.
- Results of the Primary Election Held June 3, 1969 (PDF). Secretary of State of New Jersey. 1969.
- Results of the General Election Held November 4, 1969 (PDF). Secretary of State of New Jersey. 1969.
- Results of the Primary Election Held June 8, 1971 (PDF). Secretary of State of New Jersey. 1971.
- Results of the General Election Held November 2, 1971 (PDF). Secretary of State of New Jersey. 1971.
- Results of the Primary Election Held June 5, 1973 (PDF). Secretary of State of New Jersey. 1973.
- Results of the General Election Held November 6, 1973 (PDF). Secretary of State of New Jersey. 1973.
- Results of the Primary Election Held June 7, 1977 (PDF). Secretary of State of New Jersey. 1977.
- Results of the General Election Held November 8, 1977 (PDF). Secretary of State of New Jersey. 1977.
- Candidates For The Offices Of State Senate And General Assembly (PDF). Secretary of State of New Jersey. 1981.
- Candidates For The Offices Of State Senate And General Assembly (PDF). Secretary of State of New Jersey. 1981.
- Official Results Candidates For The Offices Of State Senate And General Assembly Primary Election - June 7, 1983 (PDF). Secretary of State of New Jersey. 1983.
- Candidates For The Offices Of State Senate And General Assembly (PDF). Secretary of State of New Jersey. 1983.
