= Gerald H. Zecker =

American politician (born 1942)

Member of the New Jersey General Assembly from the 34th Legislative District
- In office 1984–2002 Serving with Newton Miller. Joseph A. Mecca, Marion Crecco
- Preceded by: Terry LaCorte
- Succeeded by: Peter C. Eagler, Willis Edwards

Personal details
- Born: April 12, 1942 (age 84)
- Party: Republican
- Education: Fairleigh Dickinson University
- Occupation: Legislator

Gerald H. Zecker (born April 12, 1942) is an American Republican Party politician who served 18 years in the New Jersey General Assembly, from 1984 to 2002, where he represented the 34th Legislative District, losing office after several heavily Democratic communities were added to his district in the 2001 apportionment following the 2000 United States census. He served as mayor of Clifton, New Jersey from 1978 to 1982.

An insurance executive by profession, Zecker earned an undergraduate degree in business and accounting from Fairleigh Dickinson University. He served on Clifton's City Council from 1974 to 1986, on its planning board from 1976 to 1985 and was the city's mayor from 1978 to 1982.

Zecker was first elected to the Assembly in 1983, filling the seat occupied by Terry LaCorte, a one-term Republican incumbent who gave up his seat to mount an unsuccessful primary challenge to State Senator Joseph L. Bubba. He served in the Assembly as Assistant Minority Leader in 1990, as Deputy Minority Leader in 1991, as Speaker Pro Tempore from 1992 to 1995 and as Deputy Speaker starting in 1996. Zecker served on the Education Committee and the Policy and Regulatory Oversight Committee.

In 1990, Zecker questioned the viability of the construction of the 20-mile long Passaic River Flood Tunnel, saying that it could "be the biggest mistake we've ever made".

The Assembly overrode Governor of New Jersey James Florio's veto of legislation that would prevent insurance companies to use age, marital status, place of residence as sex as criteria in setting insurance rates, with Zecker arguing that the reason rural and suburban drivers pay lower rates than those in the Garden State's large cities because "cars in Newark are stolen and wrecked in far greater numbers".

Zecker planned in August 1996 to introduce legislation that would allow Clifton to become the first city in the State of New Jersey to charge inmates for the costs of their incarceration.

The New Jersey Apportionment Commission's 2001 redistricting map placed several heavily Democratic municipalities in District 34, Zecker was not reelected to his Assembly seat in the 2001 election as the Democrats took his seat, the seat that had been held by Marion Crecco for the previous ten years; she was unable to run for reelection to the seat because she instead decided to run for State Senate and her hometown of Bloomfield had been moved out of District 34, and Norman M. Robertson's State Senate seat in landslides.
