= New Jersey's 34th legislative district =

American legislative district

- Senator: Britnee Timberlake (D)
- Assembly members: Michael Venezia(D); Carmen Morales (D)
- Registration: 56.0% Democratic; 9.2% Republican; 33.6% unaffiliated
- Demographics: 30.5% White; 39.1% Black/African American; 0.7% Native American; 4.9% Asian; 0.0% Hawaiian/Pacific Islander; 14.2% Other race; 10.6% Two or more races; 25.3% Hispanic
- Population: 235,276
- Voting-age population: 182,601
- Registered voters: 161,643

New Jersey's 34th legislative district is one of 40 districts that make up the map for the New Jersey Legislature. It encompasses the Essex County municipalities of Belleville, Bloomfield, East Orange, Glen Ridge Township, Nutley, and Orange.

== Demographic information ==
As of the 2020 United States census, the district had a population of 235,276, of whom 182,601 (77.6%) were of voting age. The racial makeup of the district was 71,652 (30.5%) White, 91,979 (39.1%) African American, 1,662 (0.7%) Native American, 11,466 (4.9%) Asian, 85 (0.0%) Pacific Islander, 33,481 (14.2%) from some other race, and 24,951 (10.6%) from two or more races. Hispanic or Latino of any race were 59,478 (25.3%) of the population.

The district had 161,643 registered voters as of December 1, 2023, of whom 83,411 (51.6%) were registered as Democrats, 59,397 (36.7%) were registered as unaffiliated, 17,219 (10.7%) were registered as Republicans, and 1,616 (1.0%) were registered to other parties.

== Political representation ==
For the 2026–2027 session, the 34th legislative district of the New Jersey Legislature is represented in the State Senate by Britnee Timberlake (D, East Orange) and in the General Assembly by Carmen Morales (D, Belleville) and Michael Venezia (D, Bloomfield).

The legislative district overlaps with 10th and 11th congressional districts.

== Apportionment history ==
When the 40-district legislative map was created in 1973, the 34th district was originally located in southern Passaic County containing the municipalities of Passaic, Clifton, Little Falls, West Paterson, Totowa, and Haledon. After the 1981 redistricting, the 34th lost Passaic and Haledon picked up the large township of Wayne and Essex County municipalities of North Caldwell, West Caldwell, and Fairfield. Following the 1991 redistricting, West Paterson was removed and the western Essex County municipalities were swapped with Glen Ridge and Bloomfield.

In 2001, as a result of that year's redistricting, Bloomfield and almost all of Passaic County was removed from the district, leaving Clifton and West Paterson (renamed Woodland Park in 2007), and picking up East Orange and Montclair, municipalities formerly in the 27th district.

The 34th had previously been Republican-leaning but after the 2001 redistricting, with the addition of large minority populations in East Orange and Montclair, the 34th became Democratic-leaning. 27th district Democratic assemblywoman Nia Gill defeated incumbent Republican senator Norman M. Robertson in 2001, while Democratic newcomers Peter C. Eagler and Willis Edwards defeated incumbent Republican Gerald H. Zecker and his running mate Natalie R. Esposito to win the two Assembly seats.

Then a resident of Montclair and capitalizing on his connections with Rudy Giuliani, Ken Kurson ran in 2003 for election to the General Assembly in the 34th district as a moderate Republican, hoping to capitalize on divisions within the Democratic Party following a bitter primary battle. In a district that was reapportioned to be "so overwhelmingly Democratic that general elections would be nothing more than a formality", Kurson received 17.6% of the vote and ran a distant third behind Democratic incumbent Peter C. Eagler (with 33.2%) and his running mate Sheila Oliver (31.0%).

In 2017, Oliver was selected by Phil Murphy to be his running mate for Lieutenant Governor of New Jersey. While state law prohibits running for two offices on the same ballot, Democrats claimed a loophole by the fact that Lieutenant Governor is not a position where candidates are nominated by petition. Oliver won both re-election to the Assembly and election on Murphy's ticket in November, and resigned her Assembly seat on January 9, 2018 to accept the statewide position. Democratic committee members in Essex and Passaic Counties selected Essex County Freeholder Britnee Timberlake as her replacement in the Assembly; she was sworn in on January 29.

The 2021 legislative reapportionment removed Clifton for the first time under the current set of legislative maps, while essentially combining parts of the 28th district (Bloomfield; Glen Ridge; Nutley) with the old 34th district (East Orange/Orange), along with Belleville (29th, 2001/2011; 28th district prior).

== Election history ==
Session	Senate	General Assembly	
1974–1975	Joseph Hirkala (D)	William J. Bate (D)	Herb Klein (D)
1976–1977	Joseph Hirkala (D)	William J. Bate (D)	Emil Olszowy (R)
1978–1979	Joseph Hirkala (D)	William J. Bate (D)	Emil Olszowy (R)
1980–1981	Joseph Hirkala (D)	William J. Bate (D)	Emil Olszowy (R) (Note: Died April 18, 1980)
1980–1981	Joseph Hirkala (D)	William J. Bate (D)	S.M. Terry LaCorte (R) (Note: Elected in November 1980 special election, sworn in on November 24, 1980)
1982–1983	Joseph Bubba (R)	Newton Edward Miller (R)	S.M. Terry LaCorte (R)
1984–1985	Joseph Bubba (R)	Newton Edward Miller (R)	Gerald H. Zecker (R)
1986–1987	Joseph Bubba (R)	Newton Edward Miller (R)	Gerald H. Zecker (R)
1988–1989	Joseph Bubba (R)	Newton Edward Miller (R)	Gerald H. Zecker (R)
1990–1991	Joseph Bubba (R)	Joseph A. Mecca (D)	Gerald H. Zecker (R)
1992–1993	Joseph Bubba (R)	Marion Crecco (R)	Gerald H. Zecker (R)
1994–1995	Joseph Bubba (R)	Marion Crecco (R)	Gerald H. Zecker (R)
1996–1997	Joseph Bubba (R)	Marion Crecco (R)	Gerald H. Zecker (R)
1998–1999	Norman M. Robertson (R)	Marion Crecco (R)	Gerald H. Zecker (R)
2000–2001	Norman M. Robertson (R)	Marion Crecco (R)	Gerald H. Zecker (R)
2002–2003	Nia Gill (D)	Peter C. Eagler (D)	Willis Edwards (D)
2004–2005	Nia Gill (D)	Peter C. Eagler (D)	Sheila Oliver (D)
2006–2007	Nia Gill (D)	Thomas P. Giblin (D)	Sheila Oliver (D)
2008–2009	Nia Gill (D)	Thomas P. Giblin (D)	Sheila Oliver (D)
2010–2011	Nia Gill (D)	Thomas P. Giblin (D)	Sheila Oliver (D)
2012–2013	Nia Gill (D)	Thomas P. Giblin (D)	Sheila Oliver (D)
2014–2015	Nia Gill (D)	Thomas P. Giblin (D)	Sheila Oliver (D)
2016–2017	Nia Gill (D)	Thomas P. Giblin (D)	Sheila Oliver (D)
2018–2019	Nia Gill (D)	Thomas P. Giblin (D)	Sheila Oliver (D) (Note: Resigned January 9, 2018 to become Lieutenant Governor)
2018–2019	Nia Gill (D)	Thomas P. Giblin (D)	Britnee Timberlake (D) (Note: Appointed to the Assembly on January 29, 2018, won a November 6, 2018 special election to complete unexpired term)
2020–2021	Nia Gill (D)	Thomas P. Giblin (D)	Britnee Timberlake (D)
2022–2023	Nia Gill (D)	Thomas P. Giblin (D)	Britnee Timberlake (D)
2024–2025	Britnee Timberlake (D)	Carmen Morales (D)	Michael Venezia (D)
2026–2027	Britnee Timberlake (D)	Carmen Morales (D)	Michael Venezia (D)

== Election results ==
=== Senate ===
2021 New Jersey general election
Party	Candidate	Votes	%	±%
Democratic	Nia H. Gill	37,239	78.7	▼6.2
Republican	Scott Pollack	10,060	21.3	▲6.2
Total votes		47,299	100.0	

New Jersey general election, 2017
Party	Candidate	Votes	%	±%
Democratic	Nia H. Gill	34,565	84.9	▲11.8
Republican	Mahir Saleh	6,136	15.1	▼11.8
Total votes		40,701	100.0	

New Jersey general election, 2013
Party	Candidate	Votes	%	±%
Democratic	Nia H Gill	27,132	73.1	▼6.5
Republican	Joseph S. Cupoli	9,972	26.9	▲6.5
Total votes		37,104	100.0	

2011 New Jersey general election
Party	Candidate	Votes	%
Democratic	Nia H. Gill	17,118	79.6
Republican	Ralph Bartnik	4,386	20.4
Total votes		21,504	100.0

2007 New Jersey general election
Party	Candidate	Votes	%	±%
Democratic	Nia H. Gill	17,178	100.0	▲30.3
Total votes		17,178	100.0	

2003 New Jersey general election
Party	Candidate	Votes	%	±%
Democratic	Nia H. Gill	19,161	69.7	▲4.8
Republican	Frank C. Fusco	8,325	30.3	▼4.1
Total votes		27,486	100.0	

2001 New Jersey general election
Party	Candidate	Votes	%
Democratic	Nia H. Gill	30,453	64.9
Republican	Norman M. Robertson	16,135	34.4
Social Economic Empowerment	Marie Yvrose Celestin	368	0.8
Total votes		46,956	100.0

1997 New Jersey general election
Party	Candidate	Votes	%	±%
Republican	Norman M. Robertson	30,450	53.9	▲1.6
Democratic	Joan Waks	26,001	46.1	▼1.6
Total votes		56,451	100.0	

1993 New Jersey general election
Party	Candidate	Votes	%	±%
Republican	Joseph L. Bubba	32,681	52.3	▼0.2
Democratic	Patricia A. Royer	29,845	47.7	▲12.7
Total votes		62,526	100.0	

1991 New Jersey general election
Party	Candidate	Votes	%
Republican	Joseph L. Bubba	25,885	52.5
Democratic	Joseph A. Mecca	17,237	35.0
Unbossed, Unbiased, Unbought	Newton E. Miller	6,193	12.6
Total votes		49,315	100.0

1987 New Jersey general election
Party	Candidate	Votes	%	±%
Republican	Joseph L. Bubba	24,622	53.9	▲2.9
Democratic	Donald P. Hetchka	21,053	46.1	▼2.9
Total votes		45,675	100.0	

1983 New Jersey general election
Party	Candidate	Votes	%	±%
Republican	Joseph L. Bubba	23,993	51.0	▼1.7
Democratic	James W. Roe	23,019	49.0	▲1.7
Total votes		47,012	100.0	

1981 New Jersey general election
Party	Candidate	Votes	%
Republican	Joseph Bubba	31,044	52.7
Democratic	William J. Bate	27,843	47.3
Total votes		58,887	100.0

1977 New Jersey general election
Party	Candidate	Votes	%	±%
Democratic	Joseph Hirkala	28,628	69.6	▲5.7
Republican	Herman Schmidt	12,484	30.4	▼5.7
Total votes		41,112	100.0	

1973 New Jersey general election
Party	Candidate	Votes	%
Democratic	Joseph Hirkala	33,047	63.9
Republican	Louise Friedman	18,682	36.1
Total votes		51,729	100.0

=== General Assembly ===
2021 New Jersey general election
Party	Candidate	Votes	%	±%
Democratic	Thomas P. Giblin	36,717	39.3	▼2.6
Democratic	Britnee N. Timberlake	36,392	38.9	▼2.1
Republican	Irene DeVita	10,107	10.8	▲3.0
Republican	Tafari K. Anderson	9,830	10.5	▲2.6
Stop the Insanity	Clenard H. Childress Jr.	401	0.4	▼1.0
Total votes		93,447	100.0	

2019 New Jersey general election
Party	Candidate	Votes	%	±%
Democratic	Thomas P. Giblin	19,012	41.9	▲0.9
Democratic	Britnee N. Timberlake	18,593	41.0	▼2.0
Republican	Bharat T. Rana	3,596	7.9	▼0.4
Republican	Irene DeVita	3,527	7.8	▲0.1
Stop the Insanity!	Clenard Howard Childress Jr.	658	1.4	N/A
Total votes		45,386	100.0	

Special election, November 6, 2018
Party	Candidate	Votes	%
Democratic	Britnee N. Timberlake	53,837	81.9
Republican	Irene DeVita	10,920	16.6
Stop the Insanity	Clenard Howard Childress Jr.	983	1.5
Total votes		65,740	100.0

New Jersey general election, 2017
Party	Candidate	Votes	%	±%
Democratic	Sheila Oliver	34,340	43.0	▲1.1
Democratic	Thomas P. Giblin	32,751	41.0	▼1.3
Republican	Nicholas G. Surgent	6,637	8.3	▼4.4
Republican	Tafari Anderson	6,110	7.7	N/A
Total votes		79,838	100.0	

New Jersey general election, 2015
Party	Candidate	Votes	%	±%
Democratic	Thomas P. Giblin	13,436	42.3	▲4.7
Democratic	Sheila Y. Oliver	13,294	41.9	▲3.9
Republican	John M. Traier	4,025	12.7	▲0.5
A Better Tomorrow	Clenard H. Childress Jr.	977	3.1	N/A
Total votes		31,732	100.0	

New Jersey general election, 2013
Party	Candidate	Votes	%	±%
Democratic	Sheila Y. Oliver	27,095	38.0	▲0.9
Democratic	Thomas P. Giblin	26,802	37.6	▼1.5
Republican	Michael C. Urciouli	8,663	12.2	▲2.0
Republican	David Rios	8,654	12.2	▲2.0
Total votes		71,214	100.0	

New Jersey general election, 2011
Party	Candidate	Votes	%
Democratic	Thomas P. Giblin	16,285	39.1
Democratic	Sheila Y. Oliver	15,462	37.1
Republican	Steve Farrell	4,270	10.2
Republican	Joan Salensky	4,251	10.2
A Better Tomorrow	Clenard Childress	813	2.0
A Better Tomorrow	David Taylor	586	1.4
Total votes		41,667	100.0

New Jersey general election, 2009
Party	Candidate	Votes	%	±%
Democratic	Sheila Y. Oliver	30,379	34.9	▲0.3
Democratic	Thomas P. Giblin	29,695	34.2	▼1.5
Republican	Michael G. Mecca, III	12,867	14.8	▼0.3
Republican	Matthew Tyahla	11,889	13.7	▼0.9
A Better Tomorrow	David L. Taylor, Jr.	1,100	1.3	N/A
A BetterTomorrow	Clenard H. Childress, Jr.	1,023	1.2	▼13.4
Total votes		86,953	100.0	

New Jersey general election, 2007
Party	Candidate	Votes	%	±%
Democratic	Thomas P. Giblin	15,198	35.7	▼13.4
Democratic	Sheila Y. Oliver	14,755	34.6	▼16.3
Republican	Robert C. Bianco	6,432	15.1	N/A
Republican	Clenard H. Childress Jr.	6,210	14.6	N/A
Total votes		42,595	100.0	

New Jersey general election, 2005
Party	Candidate	Votes	%	±%
Democratic	Sheila Y. Oliver	32,501	50.9	▲19.9
Democratic	Thomas P. Giblin	31,372	49.1	▲15.9
Total votes		63,873	100.0	

New Jersey general election, 2003
Party	Candidate	Votes	%	±%
Democratic	Peter C. Eagler	17,637	33.2	▼1.2
Democratic	Sheila Y. Oliver	16,504	31.0	▼1.1
Republican	Kenneth Kurson	9,337	17.6	▼0.1
Republican	Keith E. Krebs	7,949	15.0	▼0.8
Green	Timothy A. Gaylord Jr	866	1.6	N/A
Green	Thomas Robert Gregg	864	1.6	N/A
Total votes		53,157	100.0	

New Jersey general election, 2001
Party	Candidate	Votes	%
Democratic	Peter C. Eagler	31,623	34.4
Democratic	Willis Edwards III	29,538	32.1
Republican	Gerald H. Zecker	16,306	17.7
Republican	Natalie R. Esposito	14,484	15.8
Total votes		91,951	100.0

New Jersey general election, 1999
Party	Candidate	Votes	%	±%
Republican	Gerald Zecker	20,578	30.3	▲1.6
Republican	Marion Crecco	19,953	29.4	▲1.9
Democratic	Gerard J. "Gerry" DiStefano	14,544	21.4	▼2.0
Democratic	Robert M. Ruane	12,812	18.9	▼0.9
Total votes		67,887	100.0	

New Jersey general election, 1997
Party	Candidate	Votes	%	±%
Republican	Gerald H. Zecker	32,584	28.7	▲1.7
Republican	Marion Crecco	31,125	27.5	▲2.0
Democratic	Joseph A. Mecca	26,507	23.4	▼1.1
Democratic	J. Martin Comey	22,454	19.8	▲0.4
Conservative	Joe Bukowski	710	0.6	▼1.7
Total votes		113,380	100.0	

New Jersey general election, 1995
Party	Candidate	Votes	%	±%
Republican	Gerald Zecker	18,424	27.0	▼2.4
Republican	Marion Crecco	17,400	25.5	▼4.3
Democratic	Joan Waks	16,729	24.5	▲4.5
Democratic	Anthony T.V. Petrillo	13,232	19.4	▲0.3
Conservative	Tim Feeney	1,593	2.3	N/A
Conservative	Richard Arlaus	923	1.4	N/A
Total votes		68,301	100.0	

New Jersey general election, 1993
Party	Candidate	Votes	%	±%
Republican	Marion Crecco	36,577	29.8	▼4.3
Republican	Gerald H. Zecker	36,129	29.4	▼4.9
Democratic	Steven Gerber	24,561	20.0	▲4.1
Democratic	George Tosi	23,526	19.1	▲3.3
We the People	S. Patricia Comstock	1,090	0.9	N/A
We the People	Michael Cheski	1,044	0.8	N/A
Total votes		122,927	100.0	

1991 New Jersey general election
Party	Candidate	Votes	%
Republican	Gerald H. Zecker	32,153	34.3
Republican	Marion Crecco	32,014	34.1
Democratic	Sabina O’Brien	14,914	15.9
Democratic	Victor Rabbat	14,791	15.8
Total votes		93,872	100.0

1989 New Jersey general election
Party	Candidate	Votes	%	±%
Democratic	Joseph A. Mecca	28,564	26.1	▲2.9
Republican	Gerald H. Zecker	28,003	25.6	▼2.0
Republican	Newton Miller	26,782	24.5	▼2.5
Democratic	Robert J. Baran	24,534	22.4	▲0.3
Auto Insurance Reform	Edward Schumacher	1,505	1.4	N/A
Total votes		109,388	100.0	

1987 New Jersey general election
Party	Candidate	Votes	%	±%
Republican	Gerald Zecker	24,618	27.6	▼4.7
Republican	Newton E. Miller	24,106	27.0	▼5.1
Democratic	Gloria J. Kolodziej	20,726	23.2	▲5.2
Democratic	William L. Kattak	19,696	22.1	▲4.5
Total votes		89,146	100.0	

1985 New Jersey general election
Party	Candidate	Votes	%	±%
Republican	Gerald H. Zecker	32,025	32.3	▲6.1
Republican	Newton E. Miller	31,791	32.1	▲5.4
Democratic	Joseph F. Palumbo	17,784	18.0	▼5.5
Democratic	Elisa Leib	17,411	17.6	▼4.1
Total votes		99,011	100.0	

New Jersey general election, 1983
Party	Candidate	Votes	%	±%
Republican	Newton E. Miller	23,875	26.7	▼1.4
Republican	Gerald Zecker	23,447	26.2	▼5.6
Democratic	Gerald G. Friend	21,000	23.5	▲1.8
Democratic	Bert Tucker	19,388	21.7	▲3.3
Independent Peoples Choice	Robert J. Baran	1,761	2.0	N/A
Total votes		89,471	100.0	

New Jersey general election, 1981
Party	Candidate	Votes	%
Republican	S. M. Terry LaCorte	36,776	31.8
Republican	Newton E. Miller	32,539	28.1
Democratic	Joseph Grecco	25,063	21.7
Democratic	Lawrence M. Sinsimer	21,312	18.4
Total votes		115,690	100.0

Special election, 1980
Party	Candidate	Votes	%
Republican	S.M. Terry LaCorte	30,615	55.1
Democratic	Herbert M. Sorkin	24,959	44.9
Total votes		55,574	100.0

New Jersey general election, 1979
Party	Candidate	Votes	%	±%
Republican	Emil Olszowy	15,048	25.1	▼0.6
Democratic	William J. Bate	14,893	24.8	▼5.9
Democratic	Herbert M. Sorkin	13,378	22.3	▲0.5
Republican	Frederick De Furia	12,663	21.1	▲2.4
Independent	Frank Sylvester	4,000	6.7	N/A
Total votes		59,982	100.0	

New Jersey general election, 1977
Party	Candidate	Votes	%	±%
Democratic	William J. Bate	25,138	30.7	▼1.0
Republican	Emil Olszowy	21,055	25.7	▲1.9
Democratic	Anthony M. Barbieri	17,852	21.8	▼1.4
Republican	Anthony De Pasquale	15,324	18.7	▲2.0
Tax Revolt Independent	John L. Salek	1,281	1.6	N/A
No Income Tax	Philip Martini	1,131	1.4	N/A
Total votes		81,781	100.0	

New Jersey general election, 1975
Party	Candidate	Votes	%	±%
Democratic	William J. Bate	25,930	31.7	▲0.4
Republican	Emil Olszowy	19,484	23.8	▲4.2
Democratic	Herbert C. Klein	19,011	23.2	▼6.8
Republican	Robert Steffy	13,672	16.7	▼2.4
Tax Revolt	Thomas Caslander	1,772	2.2	N/A
Tax Revolt	Valerie Mazzeo	1,188	1.5	N/A
U.S. Labor	Robert Bowen	491	0.6	N/A
Socialist Labor	Robert Clement	367	0.4	N/A
Total votes		81,915	100.0	

New Jersey general election, 1973
Party	Candidate	Votes	%
Democratic	William J. Bate	31,087	31.3
Democratic	Herbert C. Klein	29,862	30.0
Republican	Joseph F. Scancarella	19,485	19.6
Republican	Thomas A. Cupo	18,976	19.1
Total votes		99,410	100.0
