= Joseph Bubba =

American politician (born 1938)

Joseph L. Bubba

Member of the New Jersey Senate from the 34th district
- In office January 12, 1982 – January 13, 1998
- Preceded by: James Wallwork
- Succeeded by: Norman M. Robertson

Personal details
- Born: February 28, 1938 (age 88) Easton, Pennsylvania
- Party: Republican
- Spouse: Patricia Bubba
- Education: Seton Hall University (BS)

Joseph L. Bubba (born February 28, 1938) is an American Republican Party politician who served for five terms in the New Jersey Senate.

Bubba served in the United States Navy Reserves from 1959 to 1961 and served on the aircraft carrier USS Forrestal (CV-59) with the rank of seaman. He got a degree in marketing from Seton Hall University and was a manager for New Jersey Bell Telephone Company. He served on the Board of Education of the Wayne Public Schools from 1971 to 1975, and was elected to the Passaic County Board of Chosen Freeholders in 1975. He lost a bid for re-election in 1978, and was elected Passaic County Republican Chairman in 1979.

Bubba was first elected to the Senate in 1981, when redistricting reconfigured the 34th Legislative District, which included Wayne and Clifton in Passaic County, and parts of Western Essex County. He defeated Democrat William J. Bate, an Assemblyman and ex-Senator, by a 53-47% margin. Two years later, Bubba faced a GOP primary challenge from Assemblyman S.M. Terry LaCorte, which he won 57%-43%. He survived a tough general election campaign against Passaic County Freeholder James Roe, the brother of U.S. Rep. Robert Roe by just 974 votes. He won re-election in 1987, 1991 and 1993 against Democrats Donald Hetchka, Assemblyman Joseph Mecca and ex-State Consumer Affairs Director Patricia Royer, respectively.

When Roe retired in 1992, Bubba ran for the Republican nomination for the seat. He was defeated in the general election by former Assemblyman Herb Klein by a wide margin. In 1997, Bubba was challenged by Passaic County Freeholder Norman M. Robertson in the primary. Robertson gained the backing of the Republicans in the district and easily defeated Bubba by a count of 66%-34%.

In the Senate, Bubba served as Assistant Minority Whip from 1985 to 1986, as Minority Whip from 1987 to 1988, and as Assistant Minority Leader from 1988 to 1991. He lost his leadership post after the 1991 election after Donald DiFrancesco defeated Bubba's ally, John H. Dorsey, for Senate President.

Bubba retired to Florida after a career with the phone company, and in 2004 made a bid for Pompano Beach, Florida City Commissioner. He received 235 votes—just 8% -- in his fourth-place finish. (The candidate who finished third lost by 27 percentage points and Bubba got less than half the number of votes she did.)
