= Emil Olszowy =

American politician

Member of the New Jersey General Assembly from the 34th district
- In office January 13, 1976 – April 18, 1980
- Preceded by: Herb Klein
- Succeeded by: S.M. Terry LaCorte

Personal details
- Born: October 18, 1921 Passaic, New Jersey
- Died: April 18, 1980 (aged 58) Passaic, New Jersey
- Party: Republican
- Spouse: Anne D. Niewaroski
- Children: 1
- Education: New York University

Emil Olszowy (October 18, 1921 – April 18, 1980) was an American Republican Party politician from Passaic, New Jersey. He served on the city council there and for four years in the New Jersey General Assembly.

== Biography ==
Olszowy was born in Passaic in 1921. He married Anne D. Niewaroski and had one son, Ronald, born in 1945. He served in the United States Navy during World War II and from 1947 to 1968 was in the United States Army Reserve attaining the rank of Major. A graduate from New York University, he worked as an insurance broker and was vice president of the Manhattan Rubber Workers Union. He also was a part of the American Legion.

In January 1973, Olszowy was appointed to the Passaic city council and was elected to the council in November. He served on the council until taking his seat in the Assembly. In 1975, Olszowy ran for the Assembly from the 34th district consisting of southern Passaic County municipalities. Though Democratic incumbent William J. Bate came overwhelmingly in first place in the general election, Olszowy defeated another incumbent Democrat Herb Klein by just under 500 votes. Klein's backing of Governor Brendan Byrne's state income tax proposal was a factor in his defeat. During a late night 1976 session in the sweltering Assembly chambers during a debate on the creation of the income tax, Olszowy stood up. Speaker Joseph A. LeFante called on Olszowy to ask for the reason of his rising. Olszowy responded, "Mr. Speaker, I rise to aerate my shorts." He was reelected in 1977 and 1979, both times with Democrat Bate.

Olszowy died on April 18, 1980, of a heart attack at Passaic General Hospital. Following his death, The Record of Bergen County published an obituary which mentioned his arrest at 16 years of age for robbery. Assembly Speaker Christopher Jackman decried the newspaper for referencing it in his obituary. The newspaper publisher responded that as the arrest was brought up by a former political opponent that it was germane to publish.
