= Willis Edwards =

Willis Edwards may refer to:

- Willis Edwards (footballer)
- Willis Edwards (politician)
