= Newton Edward Miller =

American politician (1919–2012)

Member of the New Jersey General Assembly from the 34th district
- In office November 24, 1980 – January 10, 1984 Serving with S.M. Terry LaCorte and Gerald H. Zecker
- Preceded by: William J. Bate
- Succeeded by: Joseph A. Mecca

Personal details
- Born: March 1, 1919 East Orange, New Jersey
- Died: December 13, 2012 (aged 93) Venice, Florida
- Party: Republican

Newton Edward Miller (March 1, 1919 – December 13, 2012) was an American Republican Party politician who served in the New Jersey General Assembly, where he represented the 34th Legislative District.

Born in East Orange, New Jersey, Miller graduated from Clifton High School and earned undergraduate and graduate business degrees from Rutgers University.

Miller served as Mayor of Wayne, New Jersey from 1969 until 1982. He also served in the New Jersey General Assembly from 1982 until 1990.

Miller died in Venice, Florida on December 13, 2012.
