= Willis Edwards (politician) =

American politician

Member of the New Jersey General Assembly from the 34th district
- In office January 10, 2002 – January 14, 2004 Serving with Peter C. Eagler
- Preceded by: Marion Crecco; Gerald H. Zecker
- Succeeded by: Sheila Oliver

Personal details
- Born: October 4, 1970 (age 55) Elizabeth, New Jersey, U.S.
- Party: Democratic
- Education: William Paterson University

Willis Edwards III (born October 4, 1970) is an American Democratic Party politician who represented the 34th Legislative District in the New Jersey General Assembly from 2002 to 2004.

Born in Elizabeth, New Jersey, Edwards graduated from Clifford Scott High School in East Orange, New Jersey, and earned his undergraduate degree at William Paterson University.

In 2020, Edwards faced charges that he as deputy business administrator for Orange, New Jersey, he defrauded the city by obtaining $20,000 in kickbacks from a vendor who was awarded a $350,000 no-bid contract for a computer network.

== Elected office ==
In the 2001 general election, with the district reconfigured as part of the 2001 apportionment to add East Orange and Montclair, the Democratic slate won a strong victory, with Nia Gill defeating Republican incumbent Norman M. Robertson, and Edwards and fellow newcomer Peter C. Eagler defeating incumbent Republican Gerald H. Zecker and his running mate Natalie R. Esposito.
