= Herb Klein (politician) =

American businessman, attorney and politician (1930–2023)

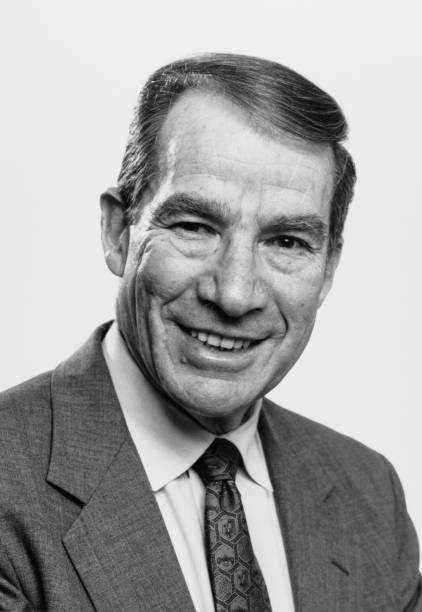
- Klein in 1993

Member of the U.S. House of Representatives from New Jersey's 8th district
- In office January 3, 1993 – January 3, 1995
- Preceded by: Robert A. Roe
- Succeeded by: Bill Martini

Member of the New Jersey General Assembly
- In office January 9, 1972 – January 9, 1976
- Preceded by: Alfred Fontanella; James White
- Succeeded by: Emil Olszowy
- Constituency: District 14A (1972–1974); 34th District (1974–1976)

Personal details
- Born: June 24, 1930 Newark, New Jersey, U.S.
- Died: November 24, 2023 (aged 93)
- Resting place: King Solomon Memorial Park in Clifton, New Jersey
- Party: Democratic
- Spouse: Jaqueline Krieger (m. 1952; died 2017)
- Children: 2
- Education: Rutgers University (BA); Harvard University (JD); New York University (LLM)
- Profession: Businessman, attorney, politician

Military service
- Allegiance: United States
- Branch/service: United States Air Force
- Years of service: 1954–1956
- Rank: First Lieutenant

Herbert C. Klein (June 24, 1930 – November 24, 2023) was an American businessman, attorney, and politician who represented New Jersey in the United States House of Representatives for one term from 1993 to 1995.

== Early life and education ==
Klein was born in Newark, New Jersey on June 24, 1930, the son of Fae (Sackin) and Alfred Klein, an accountant. His family were Jewish emigrants from Hungary and Russia. He received his BA from Rutgers University in 1950 and a JD from Harvard Law School in 1952, as well as an LLM from New York University in 1958.

Klein served in the United States Air Force from 1954 to 1956, where he was assigned to the Wright-Patterson Air Force Base near Dayton, Ohio. Admitted to the bar in 1953, he commenced the practice of law in Passaic, New Jersey, and in 1961 founded the First Real Estate Investment Trust of New Jersey.

== Political career ==
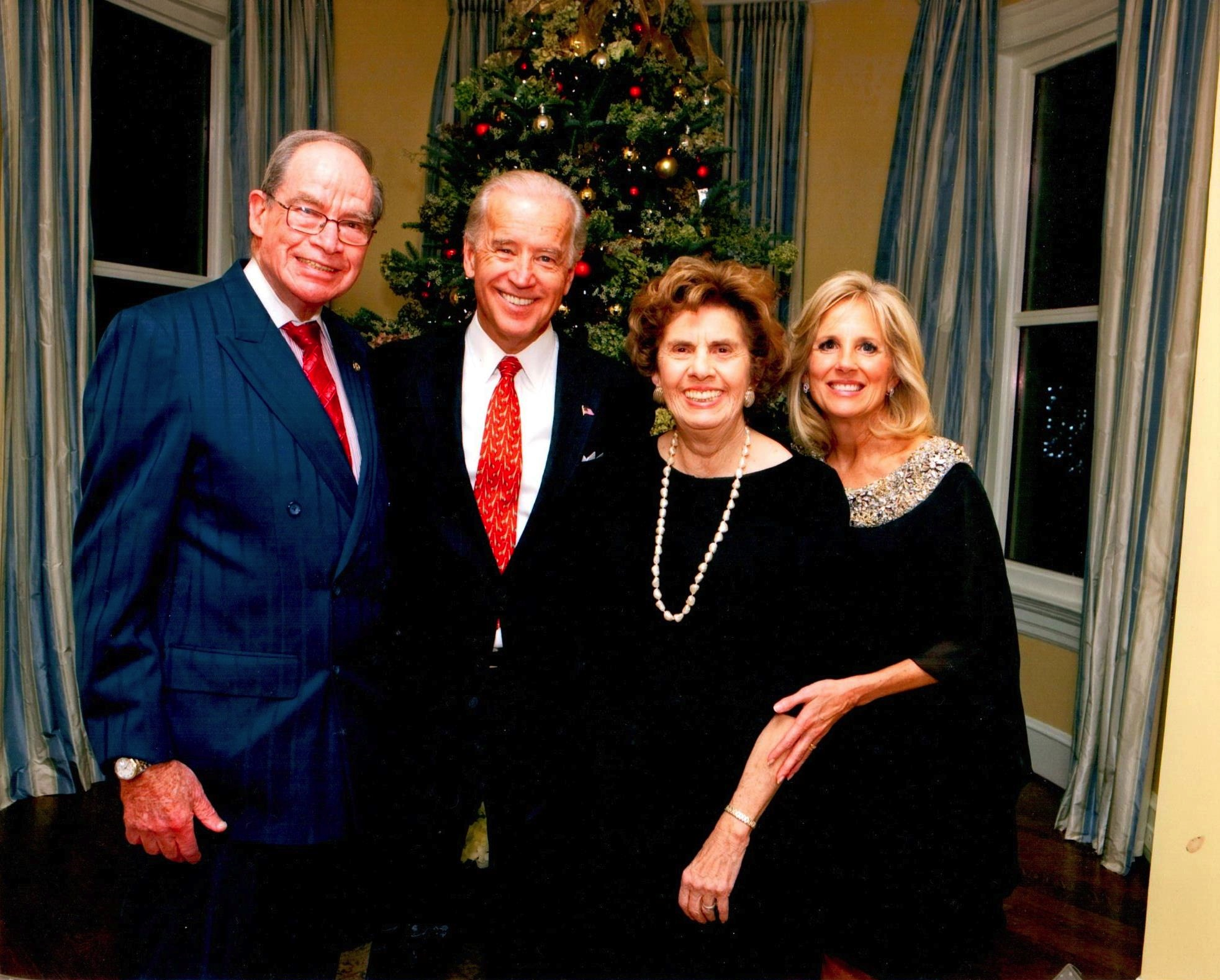
Klein and wife Jacqueline with Vice President Joe Biden and Second Lady Jill Biden

After defeating incumbent Joseph Scancarella in 1971, Klein served as a member of the New Jersey General Assembly from 1972 to 1976. There, he authored the law that created the New Jersey Economic Development Authority. In the Assembly, was co-counsel on a bond issue for New Jersey Sports and Exposition Authority, and worked for the introduction of the state income tax. He also served as Executive Director of the Passaic County Democratic Committee from 1977 to 1981. He was elected as a Democrat to the 103rd United States Congress in 1992 to succeed retiring eleven-term incumbent Robert Roe in the historically Democratic eighth district.

== Tenure in Congress ==
During his tenure in the United States House of Representatives, Klein was a leader on the House Banking Committee, where he was responsible for several legislative initiatives. He co-authored the bills that authorized interstate branch banking and was the architect of the provision which sparked passage of the legislation that ended the problems in the savings and loan industry.

Klein also served on the House Science Committee, where he co-authored the National Competitiveness Act which helped to strengthen American industry. Klein was defeated for re-election by Clifton city councilman and Passaic County freeholder Bill Martini, making him one of 54 Democrats to lose their seats in the 1994 Congressional Elections.

== Business and legal career ==
Klein obtained one of the largest civil verdicts on behalf of a plaintiff in New Jersey in Laganella v. Braen.

== Affiliations ==
Klein served continuously as a Trustee of the First Real Estate Investment Trust of New Jersey from 1961 onwards, leading the Trust as President from 1991 to 1993. He was once a member of the Board of Trustees of Rutgers University, likewise once President of the Board of Trustees of Beth Israel Hospital, as well as a member of the Governor's Committee for the New Jersey Development Council, a member of the Board of Overseers of the Rutgers University Foundation, a member of the Executive Committee of the board of directors of the Rutgers University Foundation, Chairman of the President's Council of the Rutgers University Foundation, a member of the Board of Trustees of the Montclair Art Museum, and a member of the board of directors of multiple philanthropic organizations.

== Personal life and death ==
Klein married Jacqueline Krieger in 1952, and had a son and a daughter. His wife died in 2017. Herb Klein died on November 24, 2023, at the age of 93, and was buried in King Solomon Memorial Park in Clifton, New Jersey on November 26. Eulogies were delivered by New Jersey Governor Phil Murphy and Congressman Bill Pascrell among others.

On November 28, 2023, the United States House of Representatives held a moment of silence in honor of Klein.

== See also ==
- List of Jewish members of the United States Congress

U.S. House of Representatives
Preceded by Robert A. Roe	Member of the U.S. House of Representatives from New Jersey's 8th congressional district 1993–1995	Succeeded by William J. Martini
New Jersey General Assembly
Preceded by District created	Member of the New Jersey General Assembly from the 34th Legislative District; 1974–1976; Served alongside: William J. Bate	Succeeded by Emil Olszowy
Preceded by Alfred Fontanella; James White	Member of the New Jersey General Assembly from District 14A; 1972–1974	Succeeded by District eliminated
