= S.M. Terry LaCorte =

American politician (born 1937)

Member of the New Jersey General Assembly from the 34th district
- In office November 24, 1980 – January 10, 1984 Serving with William J. Bate and Newton Edward Miller
- Preceded by: Emil Olszowy
- Succeeded by: Gerald H. Zecker

Personal details
- Born: March 2, 1937 (age 89) Passaic, New Jersey
- Party: Republican

S.M. Terry LaCorte (born March 2, 1937) is an American politician born in Passaic, New Jersey, and raised in neighboring Clifton, who served in the New Jersey General Assembly from the 34th Legislative District from 1980 to 1984, coincidentally being replaced by the then-most recent mayor of his hometown, Gerald Zecker. Along with his political service, LaCorte also served as one of the operators of his family's local real estate firm, LaCorte Agency, LLC.
