= Joseph A. Mecca =

American politician

Member of the New Jersey General Assembly from the 34th district
- In office January 9, 1990 – January 14, 1992 Serving with Gerald H. Zecker
- Preceded by: Newton Edward Miller
- Succeeded by: Marion Crecco

Personal details
- Born: June 7, 1956 (age 70) Brooklyn, New York City, New York
- Party: Democratic

Joseph A. Mecca (born June 7, 1956) is an American politician who served in the New Jersey General Assembly from the 34th Legislative District from 1990 to 1992.
