= Norman M. Robertson =

American lawyer (born 1951)

Member of the New Jersey Senate from the 34th district
- In office January 13, 1998 – January 8, 2002
- Preceded by: Joseph Bubba
- Succeeded by: Nia Gill

Personal details
- Born: April 12, 1951 (age 75) Paterson, New Jersey, U.S.
- Party: Republican
- Spouse: Peggy Robertson
- Education: Rutgers University (BA); Fordham University (JD)

Norman M. "Norm" Robertson (born April 12, 1951) is an American Republican Party politician and attorney who served a single term in the New Jersey Senate, from 1998 to 2002.

Born in Paterson, New Jersey, he earned his undergraduate degree from Rutgers University with a major in Political Science and was awarded his J.D. degree from the Fordham University School of Law. An attorney by profession, Robertson served on the Passaic County Board of Chosen Freeholders, where he was the Chairman of the Freeholder Finance and Administration Committee. He was also Chairman of the Passaic County Utilities Authority and served on the Urban Economic Development Task Force.

In 1982, Robertson was the Republican nominee for Congress in the 8th district against Democratic incumbent Robert Roe, but won only 29% of the vote. He ran again for Congress again in 1992 when Roe retired, but lost the Republican primary to State Senator Joseph Bubba by a 63%-25% margin.

In 1997, Robertson announced he was going to seek the Republican nomination for Bubba's seat in the State Senate. Benefitting from support that put him on the primary line with the incumbent Assembly members in the district, Robertson handily defeated Bubba in the election that followed. Robertson won the general election in 1997 with 53.9% of the vote, defeating Democrat Joan Waks, who had garnered 46.1% of the vote. While in the Senate, Robertson served as Vice Chair of the Senior Citizens, Veterans' Affairs and Human Services Committee, on the Judiciary Committee and on the State Government, Banking and Financial Institutions Committee.

Robertson, a white Republican, sharply criticized the Apportionment Commission's 2001 redistricting map, stating that his "belief is that the map is racist" because it reduced the voting strength of African-American voters in Essex County calling it "the result of a manipulation of the African-American community to serve the white political establishment".

Robertson lost his bid for re-election in 2001 to then-District 27 Assemblywoman Nia Gill, after heavily Democratic communities (including Gill's) had been added to the 34th District as part of the 2001 redistricting. District 34 had long been a Republican stronghold; the redistricting also cost nine-term incumbent Assemblyman Gerald H. Zecker to lose his seat. In a three-way race, Gill took the seat with 64.9% of the votes cast, Robertson receiving 34.4% and Marie Yvrose Celestin receiving under one percent of the vote.

Robertson is a native of Clifton, New Jersey. He has since moved to Wayne, New Jersey.

Sixteen years after his defeat, Robertson announced he would be running for the state legislature once again. Robertson and former District 36 Assemblyman Paul DiGaetano announced a combined effort to win the Republican nominations for all three seats in New Jersey Legislative District 40, which was just about tantamount to an overall victory as District 40 has been a reliably Republican district since its formation in 1973.

At its March 2017 convention, Bergen County Republicans selected DiGaetano as their nominee for Senate, with Robertson as a nominee for General Assembly. The county endorsed Wyckoff mayor Christopher DePhillips for the second assembly seat; DiGaetano and Robertson had attempted to get Joseph Bubba, Jr., on their line but the Bergen County GOP would not agree. Due to the expansive nature of District 40, Bergen County's slate competed against two other tickets. The Passaic County Republican slate also backed DePhillips, along with the incumbent Assemblyman David Russo and the then-interim Senator, former county clerk Kristin Corrado. The Essex County slate was the same except they nominated Edward Buttimore for Senate. Robertson and Bubba were defeated in their primary race, as was DiGaetano, as the Passaic County slate won.
