= Alfred Fontanella =

American lawyer (1923-2002)

Alfred E. Fontanella (July 27, 1923 – October 12, 2002) was an American Republican Party politician who served in the New Jersey General Assembly. Born in Paterson, New Jersey, he was a graduate of Seton Hall University Law School and served as an Assistant Passaic County Prosecutor from 1966 to 1967. He was elected to the State Assembly in 1967, and was re-elected in 1969. He was the Republican nominee for the U.S. House of Representatives in 1970, but lost to freshman Democratic incumbent Robert A. Roe by a 61%-39% margin. In 1971, he was an unsuccessful candidate for the New Jersey State Senate. He ran again for the State Senate in 1977 and was defeated.
