= William J. Bate =

American politician (1934–2011)

William J. Bate (April 10, 1934 – January 29, 2011) was an American Democratic Party politician who served as a state senator, assemblyman, and county judge.

Bate was born April 10, 1934, in Passaic, New Jersey, the son of William Warren Bate and Winifred Irene King Bate. He graduated from Public School No. 1 in Clifton, St. Peter's Prep in Jersey City in 1951, St. Peter's College in Jersey City in 1955, and Georgetown University Law School in 1958. Bate later enrolled and earned a master's degree in American Political Systems from Rutgers University while serving in the legislature.

He spent six years as a legislative assistant to Congressman Charles Samuel Joelson, a Democrat from New Jersey. He was elected to the Clifton City Council in 1966, albeit controversially being passed over for selection as his hometown's newest mayor, afterward, despite having won the most votes among the local council election voters that year, reportedly due to being the only registered Democrat elected to the council that year, alongside six other registered Republican council members, with councilman Joseph Vanecek instead serving the following term as mayor; Bate, nonetheless, won election to the Passaic County Board of Chosen Freeholders in 1968. He served as Freeholder Director in 1971.

In 1971, Bate was elected to the New Jersey State Senate. Passaic County had three Senate seats, all elected at-large, and none of the three Fourteenth District incumbent Republicans sought re-election. Bate finished third, defeating Republican Assemblyman Alfred Fontanella by nearly 8,000 votes.

Redistricting for the 1973 elections created single-member Senate districts and put Bate in the same district as another Democratic state senator, Joseph Hirkala. Rather than challenge Hirkala in the primary, Bate instead chose to run for the New Jersey General Assembly and was elected to represent the 34th district. He was re-elected in 1975, 1977 and 1979.

Following the 1981 redistricting, Bate was placed in the newly drawn 34th district, which included parts of Passaic and Essex counties. (Hirkala ran in the Passaic-Bergen 36th district.) He was unopposed for the Democratic nomination, but lost the general election to Passaic County Republican Chairman Joseph Bubba by a 53%-47% margin.

Bate was elected Passaic County Surrogate (Probate Court Judge) in 1982, and was re-elected in 1992, 1997, 2002 and 2007. He died in office in 2011.

A resident of Clifton, New Jersey, he was married for 48 years to Clara Estrella Bate, a native of the Dominican Republic, and had two sons, William E. Bate and Robert B. Bate.
