= Robert A. Roe =

American politician (1924–2014)

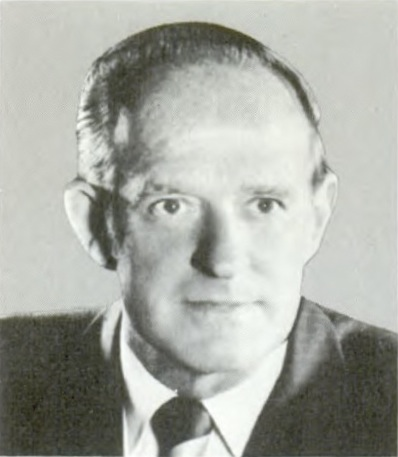
- Robert A. Roe in 1991

Member of the U.S. House of Representatives from New Jersey's 8th district
- In office November 4, 1969 – January 3, 1993
- Preceded by: Charles S. Joelson
- Succeeded by: Herb Klein

Chair of the House Transportation Committee
- In office January 3, 1991 – January 3, 1993
- Preceded by: Glenn M. Anderson
- Succeeded by: Norman Mineta

Chair of the House Science Committee
- In office January 3, 1987 – January 3, 1991
- Preceded by: Don Fuqua
- Succeeded by: George Brown Jr.

Personal details
- Born: Robert Aloysius Roe; February 28, 1924 Lyndhurst, New Jersey, U.S.
- Died: July 15, 2014 (aged 90) Green Pond, New Jersey, U.S.
- Party: Democratic
- Education: Oregon State University; Washington State University
- Robert A. Roe's voice Roe, as chair of the House Transportation Committee, speaks in support of airport and airway improvement legislation Recorded May 19, 1992

Robert Aloysius Roe (February 28, 1924 – July 15, 2014) was an American Democratic Party politician who represented New Jersey in the United States House of Representatives from November 4, 1969 to January 3, 1993.

== Early life and education ==
Roe was born in Lyndhurst, New Jersey on February 28, 1924, and raised in Wayne, New Jersey. He graduated from Pompton Lakes High School and attended college at Oregon State University in Corvallis and Washington State University in Pullman.

== Early career ==
During World War II, Roe served in the United States Army. Roe served as a committeeman of Wayne from 1955 to 1956 and became the Mayor of Wayne Township in 1956, serving in that capacity until 1961. He also served on the Passaic County Board of Chosen Freeholders from 1959 to 1963, and as Freeholder Director in 1962 and 1963.

In 1963, he was appointed as the Commissioner of the New Jersey Conservation and Economic Development Department and served until his 1969 resignation. In 1969, Charles S. Joelson resigned from Congress.

== Tenure in Congress ==
On November 4, Roe was elected as Democrat to the U.S. House of Representatives in a special election.

Roe had a mostly liberal voting record, but he was anti-abortion.

He was an unsuccessful candidate for the Democratic nomination for Governor in 1977 and 1981. In both races, Roe came in 2nd place for the nomination.

=== Committees ===
Roe served as Chairman of the Committee on Science, Space, and Technology (1987–1991) and the Committee on Public Works and Transportation, 1991–93.

Roe retired after the 1992 election and later worked as a consultant.

== Later life ==
The former lawmaker was convicted of driving drunk when he crashed into a minivan in Rockaway Township, New Jersey in 1993, seriously injuring a woman and her 15-year-old daughter.

In January 2008 a bill was passed to name Route 23 after the former Congressman. Mothers Against Drunk Driving protested the plan to name the highway after a man who seriously injured two people while driving drunk. A spokesman stated that Governor Jon Corzine did not know about the accident when he signed the bill and that a second bill would have to be passed by the New Jersey Legislature to overturn the naming. Roe himself then requested that lawmakers repeal the legislation.

== Death ==
Roe died of congestive heart failure at his home in the Green Pond section of Rockaway Township, New Jersey at the age of 90 on July 15, 2014.

U.S. House of Representatives
Preceded by Charles S. Joelson	Member of the U.S. House of Representatives from New Jersey's 8th congressional district 1969–1993	Succeeded by Herbert Klein
Political offices
Preceded by Don Fuqua; Florida	Chairman of House Science Committee; 1987–1991	Succeeded by George Brown Jr. California
Preceded by Glenn M. Anderson; California	Chairman of House Transportation Committee; 1991–1993	Succeeded by Norman Mineta; California
