= 2001 New Jersey General Assembly election =

- November 6, 2001

All 80 seats to the General Assembly 41 seats needed for a majority
- Turnout: 49% (▲18pp)
	Majority party	Minority party
Leader	Joseph J. Roberts (stepped down)	Jack Collins (retired)
Party	Democratic	Republican
Leader since	January 12, 1998	January 9, 1996
Leader's seat	5th (Bellmawr)	3rd (Gloucester City)
Last election	35	45
Seats won	44	35
Seat change	▲9	▼9
- Results: Democratic gain Democratic hold Republican hold
Speaker before election
Jack Collins
Republican
Elected Speaker
Albio Sires
Democratic

The 2001 New Jersey General Assembly elections were held on November 6, 2001, for all 80 seats in the lower house of the New Jersey Legislature. The election coincided with a gubernatorial election where Democrat Jim McGreevey won. Republicans held a 45-35 majority in the lower house prior to the election. The members of the New Jersey Legislature are chosen from 40 electoral districts. Each district elects one state senator and two State Assembly members. New Jersey uses coterminous legislative districts for both its State Senate and General Assembly. This was the first election under the maps from the 2000 census.

The Democratic Party flipped the chamber with a 44-36 majority. As of 2025, Democrats continue to hold a majority in the General Assembly. Democrats were able to flip one seat in the 1st, 36th, and 38th districts, and both seats in the 3rd, 22nd, and 34th.

== Background ==
=== Redistricting ===
1992–02

2002–2012

New Jersey Legislature before (left) and after (right) the 2001 redistricting

The new map was based on a revised Democratic map chosen by Professor Larry Bartels of Princeton University, the non-partisan member of the reapportionment commission. Republicans challenged the district map under the Voting Rights Act of 1965, arguing that by shifting some African-American and Hispanic voters out of three predominantly minority districts in and around Newark and spreading them to other, mostly white districts, the plan diluted minority voting strength. The case was rejected by the U.S. Court for the District of New Jersey. The Republican suit was dismissed partly under the influence of the near-unanimous support of New Jersey's incumbent minority legislators for the Democratic claim that their map would result in more minority representation, rather than less.

== Incumbents not seeking re-election ==
=== Democratic ===
- Bob Smith, District 17
- Barbara Buono, District 18
- Joseph Suliga, District 20
- Nia Gill, District 27
- LeRoy J. Jones Jr., District 27
- Joseph Charles, District 31
- Ken Zisa, District 37

=== Republican ===
- Kenneth LeFevre, District 2
- Jack Collins, District 3
- Gary Stuhltrager, District 3
- Joel Weingarten, District 21
- Richard Bagger, District 22
- Leonard Lance, District 23
- Marion Crecco, District 34
- John V. Kelly, District 36
- Guy Talarico, District 38
- Nicholas Felice, District 40

== Summary of results by district ==
Legislative District	Position	Incumbent	Party	Elected Assembly Member	Party
1st	1	Nicholas Asselta	Republican	Nicholas Asselta	Republican
1st	2	John C. Gibson	Republican	Jeff Van Drew	Democratic
2nd	1	Kenneth LeFevre	Republican	Paul R. D'Amato	Republican
2nd	2	Francis J. Blee	Republican	Francis J. Blee	Republican
3rd	1	Jack Collins	Republican	John J. Burzichelli	Democrat
3rd	2	Gary Stuhltrager	Republican	Douglas H. Fisher	Democrat
4th	1	Robert J. Smith II	Democrat	Robert J. Smith II	Democrat
4th	2	George Geist	Republican	George Geist	Republican
5th	1	Nilsa Cruz-Perez	Democrat	Nilsa Cruz-Perez	Democrat
5th	2	Joseph J. Roberts	Democrat	Joseph J. Roberts	Democrat
6th	1	Louis Greenwald	Democrat	Louis Greenwald	Democrat
6th	2	Mary Previte	Democrat	Mary Previte	Democrat
7th	1	Herb Conaway	Democrat	Herb Conaway	Democrat
7th	2	Jack Conners	Democrat	Jack Conners	Democrat
8th	1	Francis Bodine	Republican	Francis Bodine	Republican
8th	2	Larry Chatzidakis	Republican	Larry Chatzidakis	Republican
9th	1	Jeffrey Moran	Republican	Jeffrey Moran	Republican
9th	2	Christopher J. Connors	Republican	Christopher J. Connors	Republican
10th	1	James W. Holzapfel	Republican	James W. Holzapfel	Republican
10th	2	David W. Wolfe	Republican	David W. Wolfe	Republican
11th	1	Thomas S. Smith	Republican	Thomas S. Smith	Republican
11th	2	Steve Corodemus	Republican	Steve Corodemus	Republican
12th	1	Clare Farragher	Republican	Clare Farragher	Republican
12th	2	Michael Arnone	Republican	Michael Arnone	Republican
13th	1	Samuel D. Thompson	Republican	Samuel D. Thompson	Republican
13th	2	Joseph Azzolina	Republican	Joseph Azzolina	Republican
14th	1	Gary Guear	Democrat	Gary Guear	Democrat
14th	2	Linda Greenstein	Democrat	Linda Greenstein	Democrat
15th	1	Bonnie Watson Coleman	Democrat	Bonnie Watson Coleman	Democrat
15th	2	Reed Gusciora	Democrat	Reed Gusciora	Democrat
16th	1	Peter Biondi	Republican	Peter Biondi	Republican
16th	2	Christopher Bateman	Republican	Christopher Bateman	Republican
17th	1	Bob Smith	Democrat	Upendra Chivukula	Democrat
17th	2	Jerry Green	Democrat	Joseph V. Egan	Democrat
18th	1	Peter Barnes	Democrat	Peter Barnes	Democrat
18th	2	Barbara Buono	Democrat	Patrick J. Diegnan	Democrat
19th	1	Arline Friscia	Democrat	Arline Friscia	Democrat
19th	2	John Wisniewski	Democrat	John Wisniewski	Democrat
20th	1	Neil M. Cohen	Democrat	Neil M. Cohen	Democrat
20th	2	Joseph Suliga	Democrat	Joseph Cryan	Democrat
21st	1	Joel Weingarten	Republican	Thomas Kean Jr. (Note: Redistricted from the 22nd district.)	Republican
21st	2	Eric Munoz	Republican	Eric Munoz	Republican
22nd	1	Richard Bagger	Republican	Linda Stender	Democrat
22nd	2	Thomas Kean Jr.	Republican	Jerry Green (Note: Redistricted from the 17th district.)	Democrat
23rd	1	Leonard Lance	Republican	Michael J. Doherty	Republican
23rd	2	Connie Myers	Republican	Connie Myers	Republican
24th	1	Guy Gregg	Republican	Guy Gregg	Republican
24th	2	Scott Garrett	Republican	Scott Garrett	Republican
25th	1	Rick Merkt	Republican	Rick Merkt	Republican
25th	2	Michael Patrick Carroll	Republican	Michael Patrick Carroll	Republican
26th	1	Alex DeCroce	Republican	Alex DeCroce	Republican
26th	2	Joseph Pennacchio	Republican	Joseph Pennacchio	Republican
27th	1	LeRoy J. Jones Jr.	Democrat	John F. McKeon	Democrat
27th	2	Nia Gill	Democrat	Mims Hackett	Democrat
28th	1	Craig A. Stanley	Democrat	Craig A. Stanley	Democrat
28th	2	Wilfredo Caraballo	Democrat	Donald Kofi Tucker (Note: Redistricted from the 29th district.)	Democrat
29th	1	William D. Payne	Democrat	William D. Payne	Democrat
29th	2	Donald Kofi Tucker	Democrat	Wilfredo Caraballo (Note: Redistricted from the 28th district.)	Democrat
30th	1	Joseph Malone	Republican	Joseph Malone	Republican
30th	2	Melvin Cottrell	Republican	Melvin Cottrell	Republican
31st	1	Joseph Doria	Democrat	Joseph Doria	Democrat
31st	2	Joseph Charles	Democrat	Elba Perez-Cinciarelli	Democrat
32nd	1	Joan M. Quigley	Democrat	Joan Quigley	Democrat
32nd	2	Anthony Impreveduto	Democrat	Anthony Impreveduto	Democrat
33rd	1	Albio Sires	Democrat	Albio Sires	Democrat
33rd	2	Rafael Fraguela	Democrat	Rafael Fraguela	Democrat
34th	1	Marion Crecco	Republican	Peter C. Eagler	Democrat
34th	2	Gerald H. Zecker	Republican	Willis Edwards	Democrat
35th	1	Nellie Pou	Democrat	Nellie Pou	Democrat
35th	2	Alfred Steele	Democrat	Alfred Steele	Democrat
36th	1	Paul DiGaetano	Republican	Paul DiGaetano	Republican
36th	2	John V. Kelly	Republican	Paul Sarlo	Democrat
37th	1	Ken Zisa	Democrat	Gordon M. Johnson	Democrat
37th	2	Loretta Weinberg	Democrat	Loretta Weinberg	Democrat
38th	1	Guy Talarico	Republican	Matt Ahearn	Democrat
38th	2	Rose Marie Heck	Republican	Rose Marie Heck	Republican
39th	1	Charlotte Vandervalk	Republican	Charlotte Vandervalk	Republican
39th	2	John E. Rooney	Republican	John E. Rooney	Republican
40th	1	Nicholas Felice	Republican	Kevin J. O'Toole	Republican
40th	2	David C. Russo	Republican	David Russo	Republican

=== Close races ===
Districts where the difference of total votes between the top-two parties was under 10%:

1. District 1, 9.8% gain D
2. District 3, 9.4% gain
3. District 4, 1.4%
4. District 12, 7.7%
5. District 14, 7.6%
6. District 36, 1.8% gain D
7. District 38, 0.2% gain D

== List of races ==
=== District 1 ===
New Jersey general election, 2001
Party	Candidate	Votes	%
Republican	Nicholas Asselta	36,392	29.6
Democratic	Jeff Van Drew	32,271	26.3
Republican	John C. Gibson	31,067	25.3
Democratic	Douglas Jones-Romero	23,147	18.8
Total votes		122,877	100.0

=== District 2 ===
New Jersey general election, 2001
Party	Candidate	Votes	%
Republican	Paul R. D'Amato	29,427	28.1
Republican	Frank Blee	29,010	27.7
Democratic	Fred Scerni	22,833	21.8
Democratic	Dianna W. Fauntleroy	22,597	21.6
Green	Robert Paul Gabrielsky	941	0.9
Total votes		104,808	100.0

=== District 3 ===
New Jersey general election, 2001
Party	Candidate	Votes	%
Democratic	Douglas H. Fisher	31,886	28.1
Democratic	John J. Burzichelli	30,213	26.6
Republican	Michael H. Facemyer	25,823	22.8
Republican	Harold U. Johnson	25,509	22.5
Total votes		113,431	100.0

=== District 4 ===
New Jersey general election, 2001
Party	Candidate	Votes	%
Republican	George F. Geist	26,825	28.0
Democratic	Robert J. Smith	24,845	25.9
Democratic	David F. Carlamere	23,729	24.8
Republican	Sherie Y. Jenkins	20,428	21.3
Total votes		95,827	100.0

=== District 5 ===
New Jersey general election, 2001
Party	Candidate	Votes	%
Democratic	Joe Roberts	32,224	43.0
Democratic	Nilsa Cruz-Perez	30,087	40.1
Republican	Ella Hilton	12,659	16.9
Total votes		74,970	100.0

=== District 6 ===
New Jersey general election, 2001
Party	Candidate	Votes	%
Democratic	Louis D. Greenwald	38,327	32.7
Democratic	Mary T. Previte	37,895	32.3
Republican	Anthony "Tony" Clark	20,688	17.6
Republican	Lou Harvey	20,452	17.4
Total votes		117,362	100.0

=== District 7 ===
New Jersey general election, 2001
Party	Candidate	Votes	%
Democratic	Jack Conners	31,703	29.7
Democratic	Herb Conaway	31,547	29.5
Republican	Clara Ruvolo	21,740	20.3
Republican	Aubrey A. Fenton	21,066	19.7
Conservative	Hosey Best	850	0.8
Total votes		106,906	100.0

=== District 8 ===
New Jersey general election, 2001
Party	Candidate	Votes	%
Republican	Francis L. Bodine	34,972	30.4
Republican	Larry Chatzidakis	34,037	29.6
Democratic	Carol A. Murphy	23,496	20.4
Democratic	Thomas J. Price	22,622	19.6
Total votes		115,127	100.0

=== District 9 ===
New Jersey general election, 2001
Party	Candidate	Votes	%
Republican	Christopher J. Connors	44,004	30.1
Republican	Jeffrey W. Moran	43,178	29.6
Democratic	John F. Ryan	30,385	20.8
Democratic	Robert DiBella	28,521	19.5
Total votes		146,088	100.0

=== District 10 ===
New Jersey general election, 2001
Party	Candidate	Votes	%
Republican	David W. Wolfe	36,989	29.2
Republican	James W. Holzapfel	36,747	29.0
Democratic	John Furey	26,723	21.1
Democratic	Kimberley Casten	26,307	20.8
Total votes		126,766	100.0

=== District 11 ===
New Jersey general election, 2001
Party	Candidate	Votes	%
Republican	Steve Corodemus	34,002	29.0
Republican	Tom Smith	31,554	26.9
Democratic	Jim Reilly	25,674	21.9
Democratic	Warren Goode	24,267	20.7
Libertarian	Robert Hull	676	0.6
Libertarian	John M. Taylor	658	0.6
Lower Taxes Now	Karen Zaletel	592	0.5
Total votes		117,423	100.0

=== District 12 ===
New Jersey general election, 2001
Party	Candidate	Votes	%
Republican	Michael J. Arnone	31,794	27.3
Republican	Clare M. Farragher	30,476	26.2
Democratic	Gordon N. Gemma	26,823	23.0
Democratic	William I. Scherer	26,501	22.8
Natural Law	Mary Jo Christian	865	0.7
Total votes		116,459	100.0

=== District 13 ===
New Jersey general election, 2001
Party	Candidate	Votes	%
Republican	Joe Azzolina	33,777	28.9
Republican	Samuel D. Thompson	32,397	27.7
Democratic	Kevin Graham	25,851	22.1
Democratic	Steven T. Piech	23,741	20.3
Libertarian	Diane Hittner	874	0.7
We, The People	Mac Dara F.X. Lyden	422	0.4
Total votes		117,062	100.0

=== District 14 ===
New Jersey general election, 2001
Party	Candidate	Votes	%
Democratic	Linda R. Greenstein	32,878	27.5
Democratic	Gary L. Guear Sr	31,469	26.3
Republican	Barbara Wright	27,803	23.2
Republican	Paul R. Kramer	27,563	23.0
Total votes		119,713	100.0

=== District 15 ===
New Jersey general election, 2001
Party	Candidate	Votes	%
Democratic	Bonnie Watson Coleman	30,816	34.0
Democratic	Reed Gusciora	30,505	33.6
Republican	Thomas Dallessio	14,657	16.2
Republican	Rosanna Dovgala	14,076	15.5
Libertarian	Christopher C. Toto	616	0.7
Total votes		90,670	100.0

=== District 16 ===
New Jersey general election, 2001
Party	Candidate	Votes	%
Republican	Christopher “Kip” Bateman	39,136	33.8
Republican	Peter J. Biondi	37,788	32.6
Democratic	John P. Rooney	20,051	17.3
Democratic	James K. Foohey	18,948	16.3
Total votes		115,923	100.0

=== District 17 ===
New Jersey general election, 2001
Party	Candidate	Votes	%
Democratic	Joseph V. Egan	27,948	33.8
Democratic	Upendra J. Chivukula	26,374	31.9
Republican	Catherine Barrier	14,161	17.2
Republican	Anthony Mazzola	14,085	17.1
Total votes		82,568	100.0

=== District 18 ===
New Jersey general election, 2001
Party	Candidate	Votes	%
Democratic	Peter J. Barnes Jr	32,633	33.0
Democratic	Patrick Diegnan Jr	30,759	31.1
Republican	Norman J. Van Houten	18,152	18.3
Republican	Sylvester Fernandez	17,443	17.6
Total votes		98,987	100.0

=== District 19 ===
New Jersey general election, 2001
Party	Candidate	Votes	%
Democratic	John S. Wisniewski	35,090	37.4
Democratic	Arline Friscia	33,458	35.7
Republican	Billy E. Delgado	13,344	14.2
Republican	Christopher F. Struben	11,844	12.6
Total votes		93,736	100.0

=== District 20 ===
New Jersey general election, 2001
Party	Candidate	Votes	%
Democratic	Neil M. Cohen	22,457	41.3
Democratic	Joseph Cryan	22,162	40.8
Schundler for Governor	Dency J. Rivera	4,877	9.0
Schundler for Governor	Ralph J. Fabre	4,852	8.9
Total votes		54,348	100.0

=== District 21 ===
New Jersey general election, 2001
Party	Candidate	Votes	%
Republican	Thomas H. Kean, Jr.	44,223	31.8
Republican	Eric Munoz	39,457	28.4
Democratic	Tom Jardim	28,499	20.5
Democratic	J. Brooke Hern	26,896	19.3
Total votes		139,075	100.0

=== District 22 ===
New Jersey general election, 2001
Party	Candidate	Votes	%
Democratic	Linda Stender	29,169	30.5
Democratic	Jerry Green	28,258	29.6
Republican	Patricia Walsh	19,616	20.5
Republican	Gabe Spera	18,486	19.4
Total votes		95,529	100.0

=== District 23 ===
New Jersey general election, 2001
Party	Candidate	Votes	%
Republican	Connie Myers	39,313	32.4
Republican	Mike Doherty	35,345	29.2
Democratic	J. Rebecca Goff	19,995	16.5
Democratic	Thomas E. Palmieri	19,454	16.1
Warren/Hunterdon Independent	Mike King	7,060	5.8
Total votes		121,167	100.0

=== District 24 ===
New Jersey general election, 2001
Party	Candidate	Votes	%
Republican	Scott Garrett	38,242	36.3
Republican	Guy R. Gregg	36,121	34.2
Democratic	Suzanne Patnaude	15,754	14.9
Democratic	Margarita Cart	15,369	14.6
Total votes		105,486	100.0

=== District 25 ===
New Jersey general election, 2001
Party	Candidate	Votes	%
Republican	Michael Patrick Carroll	33,426	30.0
Republican	Rick Merkt	33,414	30.0
Democratic	Ann Huber	23,110	20.8
Democratic	Dick Tighe	21,408	19.2
Total votes		111,358	100.0

=== District 26 ===
New Jersey general election, 2001
Party	Candidate	Votes	%
Republican	Alex DeCroce	39,381	34.2
Republican	Joseph Pennacchio	37,251	32.4
Democratic	Joseph Raich	19,491	16.9
Democratic	Sergio Bio	18,870	16.4
Total votes		114,993	100.0

=== District 27 ===
New Jersey general election, 2001
Party	Candidate	Votes	%
Democratic	John F. McKeon	33,866	31.4
Democratic	Mims Hackett Jr	31,179	28.9
Republican	Muriel M. Shore	20,536	19.1
Republican	Joseph Tempesta	20,074	18.6
African-Americans For Justice	Natalie Heard	1,183	1.1
African-Americans For Justice	Tobi Moor	930	0.9
Total votes		107,768	100.0

=== District 28 ===
New Jersey general election, 2001
Party	Candidate	Votes	%
Democratic	Donald Tucker	27,949	37.0
Democratic	Craig A. Stanley	27,635	36.6
Republican	Charles Daglian	9,557	12.7
Republican	Michael Melham	9,042	12.0
Conservative	Vincent J. Frantantoni	866	1.1
Independent	William Coleman	474	0.6
Total votes		75,523	100.0

=== District 29 ===
New Jersey general election, 2001
Party	Candidate	Votes	%
Democratic	William D. Payne	25,422	44.6
Democratic	Wilfredo Caraballo	24,739	43.4
Republican	Elaine L. Guarino	3,572	6.3
Republican	Tharien Arnold	3,236	5.7
Total votes		56,969	100.0

=== District 30 ===
New Jersey general election, 2001
Party	Candidate	Votes	%
Republican	Joseph R. Malone III	30,903	30.6
Republican	Melvin Cottrell	29,963	29.6
Democratic	Michael L. Broderick	20,959	20.7
Democratic	Lyle M. (Peggi) Sturmfels	19,261	19.1
Total votes		101,086	100.0

=== District 31 ===
New Jersey general election, 2001
Party	Candidate	Votes	%
Democratic	Joseph V. Doria Jr	29,120	37.6
Democratic	Elba Perez-Cinciarelli	27,637	35.7
Republican	Ira F. Jersey	9,887	12.8
Republican	Ador L. Equipado	9,603	12.4
Together We'll Win	Juanita Lope'z	1,262	1.6
Total votes		77,509	100.0

=== District 32 ===
New Jersey general election, 2001
Party	Candidate	Votes	%
Democratic	Anthony Impreveduto	27,648	36.7
Democratic	Joan Quigley	27,484	36.4
Republican	Frances Cohen	10,188	13.5
Republican	Esther Gatria	10,087	13.4
Total votes		75,407	100.0

=== District 33 ===
New Jersey general election, 2001
Party	Candidate	Votes	%
Democratic	Albio Sires	28,130	37.8
Democratic	Rafael J. Fraguela	28,019	37.6
Republican	Sergio Alonso	9,229	12.4
Republican	Helen Pinoargotty	9,098	12.2
Total votes		74,476	100.0

=== District 34 ===
New Jersey general election, 2001
Party	Candidate	Votes	%
Democratic	Peter C. Eagler	31,623	34.4
Democratic	Willis Edwards III	29,538	32.1
Republican	Gerald H. Zecker	16,306	17.7
Republican	Natalie R. Esposito	14,484	15.8
Total votes		91,951	100.0

=== District 35 ===
New Jersey general election, 2001
Party	Candidate	Votes	%
Democratic	Alfred E. Steele	24,880	51.2
Democratic	Nellie Pou	23,728	48.8
Total votes		48,608	100.0

=== District 36 ===
New Jersey general election, 2001
Party	Candidate	Votes	%
Republican	Paul DiGaetano	23,563	26.8
Democratic	Paul Sarlo	21,811	24.8
Democratic	Walter G. Wargacki	20,554	23.4
Republican	James L. Cassella	20,394	23.2
Green Coalition	Nick Scardigno	602	0.7
Green Coalition	John Zazanis	497	0.6
Stop Vieques BOMBING	Rafael Sanchez	442	0.5
Total votes		87,863	100.0

=== District 37 ===
New Jersey general election, 2001
Party	Candidate	Votes	%
Democratic	Loretta Weinberg	34,443	34.4
Democratic	Gordon M. Johnson	32,687	32.6
Republican	Thomas F. Gaffney, Jr.	16,737	16.7
Republican	Sandi Cortazzo	16,270	16.2
Total votes		100,137	100.0

=== District 38 ===
New Jersey general election, 2001
Party	Candidate	Votes	%
Republican	Rose Marie Heck	27,055	25.3
Democratic	Matt Ahearn	26,919	25.2
Democratic	Kay Nest	26,587	24.9
Republican	Nicholas R. Felice	26,252	24.6
Total votes		106,813	100.0

=== District 39 ===
New Jersey general election, 2001
Party	Candidate	Votes	%
Republican	Charlotte Vandervalk	41,586	31.4
Republican	John E. Rooney	40,277	30.4
Democratic	Linda Mercurio	26,447	20.0
Democratic	Jim Carroll	24,037	18.2
Total votes		132,347	100.0

=== District 40 ===
New Jersey general election, 2001
Party	Candidate	Votes	%
Republican	David C. Russo	38,627	30.7
Republican	Kevin J. O'Toole	38,058	30.2
Democratic	Frank Delvecchio	25,027	19.9
Democratic	Donna Kurdock	24,201	19.2
Total votes		125,913	100.0

== See also ==
- 2001 New Jersey Senate election
