= 1999 New Jersey General Assembly election =

- November 2, 1999

All 80 seats to the General Assembly 41 seats needed for a majority
- Turnout: 31% (▼25pp)
	Majority party	Minority party
Leader	Jack Collins	Joseph J. Roberts
Party	Republican	Democratic
Leader since	January 9, 1996	January 12, 1998
Leader's seat	3rd (Gloucester City)	5th (Bellmawr)
Last election	48	32
Seats won	45	35
Seat change	▼3	▲3
- Results: Democratic gain Republican hold Democratic hold
Speaker before election
Jack Collins
Republican
Elected Speaker
Jack Collins
Republican

The 1999 New Jersey General Assembly elections were held on November 2, 1999, for all 80 seats in the lower house of the New Jersey Legislature. Republicans held a 48-32 majority in the lower house prior to the election. The members of the New Jersey Legislature are chosen from 40 electoral districts. Each district elects one state senator and two State Assembly members. New Jersey uses coterminous legislative districts for both its State Senate and General Assembly.

Democrats were able to flip one seat in the 4th and both in the 14th.

== Incumbents not seeking re-election ==
=== Democratic ===
- Louis Romano, District 33

== Summary of results by district ==
Legislative District	Position	Incumbent	Party	Elected Assembly Member	Party
1st	1	Nicholas Asselta	Republican	Nicholas Asselta	Republican
1st	2	John C. Gibson	Republican	John C. Gibson	Republican
2nd	1	Kenneth LeFevre	Republican	Kenneth LeFevre	Republican
2nd	2	Francis J. Blee	Republican	Francis J. Blee	Republican
3rd	1	Jack Collins	Republican	Jack Collins	Republican
3rd	2	Gary Stuhltrager	Republican	Gary Stuhltrager	Republican
4th	1	Gerald Luongo	Republican	Robert J. Smith II	Democrat
4th	2	George Geist	Republican	George Geist	Republican
5th	1	Nilsa Cruz-Perez	Democrat	Nilsa Cruz-Perez	Democrat
5th	2	Joseph J. Roberts	Democrat	Joseph J. Roberts	Democrat
6th	1	Louis Greenwald	Democrat	Louis Greenwald	Democrat
6th	2	Mary Previte	Democrat	Mary Previte	Democrat
7th	1	Herb Conaway	Democrat	Herb Conaway	Democrat
7th	2	Jack Conners	Democrat	Jack Conners	Democrat
8th	1	Francis Bodine	Republican	Francis Bodine	Republican
8th	2	Larry Chatzidakis	Republican	Larry Chatzidakis	Republican
9th	1	Jeffrey Moran	Republican	Jeffrey Moran	Republican
9th	2	Christopher J. Connors	Republican	Christopher J. Connors	Republican
10th	1	James W. Holzapfel	Republican	James W. Holzapfel	Republican
10th	2	David W. Wolfe	Republican	David W. Wolfe	Republican
11th	1	Thomas S. Smith	Republican	Thomas S. Smith	Republican
11th	2	Steve Corodemus	Republican	Steve Corodemus	Republican
12th	1	Clare Farragher	Republican	Clare Farragher	Republican
12th	2	Michael Arnone	Republican	Michael Arnone	Republican
13th	1	Samuel D. Thompson	Republican	Samuel D. Thompson	Republican
13th	2	Joseph Azzolina	Republican	Joseph Azzolina	Republican
14th	1	Paul Kramer	Republican	Gary Guear	Democrat
14th	2	Barbara W. Wright	Republican	Linda Greenstein	Democrat
15th	1	Bonnie Watson Coleman	Democrat	Bonnie Watson Coleman	Democrat
15th	2	Reed Gusciora	Democrat	Reed Gusciora	Democrat
16th	1	Peter Biondi	Republican	Peter Biondi	Republican
16th	2	Christopher Bateman	Republican	Christopher Bateman	Republican
17th	1	Bob Smith	Democrat	Bob Smith	Democrat
17th	2	Jerry Green	Democrat	Jerry Green	Democrat
18th	1	Peter Barnes	Democrat	Peter Barnes	Democrat
18th	2	Barbara Buono	Democrat	Barbara Buono	Democrat
19th	1	Arline Friscia	Democrat	Arline Friscia	Democrat
19th	2	John Wisniewski	Democrat	John Wisniewski	Democrat
20th	1	Neil M. Cohen	Democrat	Neil M. Cohen	Democrat
20th	2	Joseph Suliga	Democrat	Joseph Suliga	Democrat
21st	1	Joel Weingarten	Republican	Joel Weingarten	Republican
21st	2	Kevin J. O'Toole	Republican	Kevin J. O'Toole	Republican
22nd	1	Richard Bagger	Republican	Richard Bagger	Republican
22nd	2	Alan Augustine	Republican	Alan Augustine	Republican
23rd	1	Leonard Lance	Republican	Leonard Lance	Republican
23rd	2	Connie Myers	Republican	Connie Myers	Republican
24th	1	Guy Gregg	Republican	Guy Gregg	Republican
24th	2	Scott Garrett	Republican	Scott Garrett	Republican
25th	1	Rick Merkt	Republican	Rick Merkt	Republican
25th	2	Michael Patrick Carroll	Republican	Michael Patrick Carroll	Republican
26th	1	Alex DeCroce	Republican	Alex DeCroce	Republican
26th	2	Carol J. Murphy	Republican	Carol J. Murphy	Republican
27th	1	LeRoy J. Jones Jr.	Democrat	LeRoy J. Jones Jr.	Democrat
27th	2	Nia Gill	Democrat	Nia Gill	Democrat
28th	1	Craig A. Stanley	Democrat	Craig A. Stanley	Democrat
28th	2	Wilfredo Caraballo	Democrat	Wilfredo Caraballo	Democrat
29th	1	William D. Payne	Democrat	William D. Payne	Democrat
29th	2	Donald Kofi Tucker	Democrat	Donald Kofi Tucker	Democrat
30th	1	Joseph Malone	Republican	Joseph Malone	Republican
30th	2	Melvin Cottrell	Republican	Melvin Cottrell	Republican
31st	1	Joseph Doria	Democrat	Joseph Doria	Democrat
31st	2	Joseph Charles	Democrat	Joseph Charles	Democrat
32nd	1	Joan M. Quigley	Democrat	Joan Quigley	Democrat
32nd	2	Anthony Impreveduto	Democrat	Anthony Impreveduto	Democrat
33rd	1	Louis Romano	Democrat	Albio Sires	Democrat
33rd	2	Raul Garcia	Democrat	Raul Garcia	Democrat
34th	1	Marion Crecco	Republican	Marion Crecco	Republican
34th	2	Gerald H. Zecker	Republican	Gerald H. Zecker	Republican
35th	1	Nellie Pou	Democrat	Nellie Pou	Democrat
35th	2	Alfred Steele	Democrat	Alfred Steele	Democrat
36th	1	Paul DiGaetano	Republican	Paul DiGaetano	Republican
36th	2	John V. Kelly	Republican	John V. Kelly	Republican
37th	1	Ken Zisa	Democrat	Ken Zisa	Democrat
37th	2	Loretta Weinberg	Democrat	Loretta Weinberg	Democrat
38th	1	Guy Talarico	Republican	Guy Talarico	Republican
38th	2	Rose Marie Heck	Republican	Rose Marie Heck	Republican
39th	1	Charlotte Vandervalk	Republican	Charlotte Vandervalk	Republican
39th	2	John E. Rooney	Republican	John E. Rooney	Republican
40th	1	Nicholas Felice	Republican	Nicholas Felice	Republican
40th	2	David C. Russo	Republican	David Russo	Republican

=== Close races ===
Districts where the difference of total votes between the top-two parties was under 10%:

1. District 4, 0.01% gain D
2. District 14, 1.6% gain

== List of races ==
=== District 1 ===
New Jersey general election, 1999
Party	Candidate	Votes	%	±%
Republican	Nicholas Asselta	28,096	35.2	▲8.2
Republican	John C. Gibson	26,763	33.5	▲7.9
Democratic	Mary D'Arcy Bittner	12,146	15.2	▼10.3
Democratic	Maria A. Laboy	11,834	14.8	▼3.1
Conservative	Geraldine Caiafa	976	1.2	▲0.1
Total votes		79,815	100.0	

=== District 2 ===
New Jersey general election, 1999
Party	Candidate	Votes	%	±%
Republican	Kenneth C. LeFevre	23,414	32.8	▲0.6
Republican	Francis J. Blee	22,897	32.0	▲0.5
Democratic	John Piatt	12,797	17.9	▼0.5
Democratic	Milton Berkes	12,378	17.3	▼0.6
Total votes		71,486	100.0	

=== District 3 ===
New Jersey general election, 1999
Party	Candidate	Votes	%	±%
Republican	Jack Collins	28,609	31.0	▼5.3
Republican	Gary Stuhltrager	24,573	26.6	▼7.5
Democratic	John J. Burzichelli	20,658	22.4	▲1.6
Democratic	Ron Brittin	15,440	16.7	▲15.4
Conservative	Jan McFetridge	1,599	1.7	▼2.0
Conservative	Bob McFetridge	1,333	1.4	▼2.5
Total votes		92,212	100.0	

=== District 4 ===
New Jersey general election, 1999
Party	Candidate	Votes	%	±%
Republican	George F. Geist	19,694	27.2	▲1.4
Democratic	Robert J. Smith	18,823	26.0	▲2.8
Democratic	David Carlamere	17,422	24.0	▲2.4
Republican	Gerald J. Luongo	16,502	22.8	▼1.5
Total votes		72,441	100.0	

=== District 5 ===
New Jersey general election, 1999
Party	Candidate	Votes	%	±%
Democratic	Joe Roberts	18,429	43.6	▲0.1
Democratic	Nilsa Cruz-Perez	16,398	38.8	▼0.6
Republican	William E. Spencer	7,438	17.6	▲1.6
Total votes		42,265	100.0	

=== District 6 ===
New Jersey general election, 1999
Party	Candidate	Votes	%	±%
Democratic	Louis D. Greenwald	23,663	30.1	▲1.1
Democratic	Mary T. Previte	22,462	28.5	▲0.9
Republican	Robert J. Seltzer	15,505	19.7	▼2.3
Republican	Gerard M. Banmiller	15,293	19.4	▼2.0
Green	Jay Fox	947	1.2	N/A
Independent	Gerard "Gerry" Brigante	852	1.1	N/A
Total votes		78,722	100.0	

=== District 7 ===
New Jersey general election, 1999
Party	Candidate	Votes	%	±%
Democratic	Jack Conners	20,667	27.7	▲3.1
Democratic	Herb Conaway, MD	20,517	27.5	▲2.9
Republican	Gary Daniels	16,086	21.6	▼2.9
Republican	Clara Ruvolo	15,338	20.6	▼1.9
Conservative	Norman E. Wahner	1,025	1.4	▲0.4
Conservative	Hosey Best	896	1.2	▲0.1
Total votes		74,529	100.0	

=== District 8 ===
New Jersey general election, 1999
Party	Candidate	Votes	%	±%
Republican	Francis L. Bodine	23,094	30.0	▲1.2
Republican	Larry Chatzidakis	22,183	28.8	▲1.6
Democratic	Marie Hall	15,576	20.2	▼1.1
Democratic	George Fallon	15,143	19.7	▼1.1
Legalize Marijuana	Edward "NJWeedman" Forchion	947	1.2	N/A
Total votes		76,943	100.0	

=== District 9 ===
New Jersey general election, 1999
Party	Candidate	Votes	%	±%
Republican	Christopher J. Connors	31,492	30.6	▼1.3
Republican	Jeffrey W. Moran	31,182	30.3	▼1.6
Democratic	S. Karl Mohel	18,698	18.2	▲1.1
Democratic	Jack Ryan	18,640	18.1	▲1.7
Conservative	John N. Cardello	1,548	1.5	▲0.1
Conservative	James W. Eissing	1,335	1.3	▼0.1
Total votes		102,895	100.0	

=== District 10 ===
New Jersey general election, 1999
Party	Candidate	Votes	%	±%
Republican	James W. Holzapfel	23,227	29.3	▼1.5
Republican	David W. Wolfe	23,145	29.2	▼2.0
Democratic	Stephanie Wauters	15,895	20.1	▲2.5
Democratic	Samuel D. Kaye	14,764	18.6	▲2.0
Conservative	Morgan Strong	1,105	1.4	▲0.6
Conservative	Anthony Bertani	1,058	1.3	▲0.3
Total votes		79,194	100.0	

=== District 11 ===
New Jersey general election, 1999
Party	Candidate	Votes	%	±%
Republican	Steve Corodemus	20,858	30.1	▼1.3
Republican	Tom Smith	20,271	29.2	▼2.2
Democratic	Michael Beson	13,304	19.2	▲0.5
Democratic	Dwayne M. Harris	12,789	18.4	▲1.7
Libertarian	Barbara A. Jones	725	1.0	N/A
Conservative	Leonard P. Marshall	524	0.8	▼0.1
Conservative	Wayne E. May	511	0.7	▼0.2
Reform!	Jonathan Moschberger	372	0.5	N/A
Total votes		69,354	100.0	

=== District 12 ===
New Jersey general election, 1999
Party	Candidate	Votes	%	±%
Republican	Michael J. Arnone	19,236	28.4	▼2.3
Republican	Clare M. Farragher	18,564	27.4	▼2.7
Democratic	David M. Lerner	13,970	20.6	▲2.5
Democratic	Salvatore Vitale	12,991	19.2	▲1.9
Conservative	Frances H. Marshall	1,223	1.8	▲0.5
Conservative	Cornelius Van Sant	1,068	1.6	▲0.4
Natural Law	Mary Jo Christian	773	1.1	▲0.4
Total votes		67,825	100.0	

=== District 13 ===
New Jersey general election, 1999
Party	Candidate	Votes	%	±%
Republican	Joe Azzolina	18,758	28.1	▼2.5
Republican	Sam Thompson	17,307	25.9	▼1.2
Democratic	Patrick M. Gillespie	15,020	22.5	▲2.5
Democratic	Alex R. DeSevo	14,015	21.0	▲1.4
Conservative	Sylvia Kuzmak	820	1.2	▼0.1
Conservative	Louis A. Novellino	807	1.2	▼0.2
Total votes		66,727	100.0	

=== District 14 ===
New Jersey general election, 1999
Party	Candidate	Votes	%	±%
Democratic	Linda R. Greenstein	25,219	25.4	▲2.3
Democratic	Gary L. Guear, Sr.	25,214	25.4	▲2.6
Republican	Paul R. Kramer	24,769	25.0	▼1.2
Republican	Barbara W. Wright	23,981	24.2	▼1.8
Total votes		99,183	100.0	

=== District 15 ===
New Jersey general election, 1999
Party	Candidate	Votes	%	±%
Democratic	Bonnie Watson Coleman	21,465	32.7	▲0.5
Democratic	Reed Gusciora	21,309	32.5	▲2.0
Republican	Sidney Goldfarb, M.D.	11,505	17.5	▼2.3
Republican	Sheldon Leitner	10,422	15.9	▼1.6
Conservative	Len Grzywacz	948	1.4	N/A
Total votes		65,649	100.0	

=== District 16 ===
New Jersey general election, 1999
Party	Candidate	Votes	%	±%
Republican	Christopher “Kip” Bateman	24,646	31.2	▼0.6
Republican	Peter J. Biondi	23,789	30.2	▲0.2
Democratic	Mike Alper	15,393	19.5	▲2.0
Democratic	Donald Rudy	15,060	19.1	▲2.3
Total votes		78,888	100.0	

=== District 17 ===
New Jersey general election, 1999
Party	Candidate	Votes	%	±%
Democratic	Bob Smith	14,516	37.3	▲2.8
Democratic	Jerry Green	13,522	34.7	▲2.3
Republican	Tracy Ford	5,624	14.4	▼2.1
Republican	Daniel N. Epstein	5,275	13.5	▼1.1
Total votes		38,937	100.0	

=== District 18 ===
New Jersey general election, 1999
Party	Candidate	Votes	%	±%
Democratic	Barbara Buono	19,327	31.7	▲3.1
Democratic	Peter J. Barnes, Jr.	18,068	29.7	▲2.4
Republican	E. Martin Davidoff	11,853	19.5	▼2.6
Republican	Norman Van Houten	11,632	19.1	▼2.9
Total votes		60,880	100.0	

=== District 19 ===
New Jersey general election, 1999
Party	Candidate	Votes	%	±%
Democratic	John S. Wisniewski	23,795	39.7	▲5.3
Democratic	Arline M. Friscia	22,092	36.8	▲4.4
Republican	Frank Cottone	7,251	12.1	▼4.7
Republican	William Feingold	6,830	11.4	▼5.1
Total votes		59,968	100.0	

=== District 20 ===
New Jersey general election, 1999
Party	Candidate	Votes	%	±%
Democratic	Neil M. Cohen	14,532	38.4	▲3.6
Democratic	Joseph S. Suliga	14,195	37.5	▲2.5
Republican	Dirk Weber	4,606	12.2	▼2.9
Republican	Elvira Drzewinski	4,553	12.0	▼3.1
Total votes		37,886	100.0	

=== District 21 ===
New Jersey general election, 1999
Party	Candidate	Votes	%	±%
Republican	Kevin J. O'Toole	17,541	28.9	▼2.4
Republican	Joel M. Weingarten	17,107	28.2	▼2.9
Democratic	Michael P. Cohan	12,836	21.2	▲2.9
Democratic	Dennis M. Caufield	12,657	20.9	▲3.3
Unbossed	Robert Diamond	533	0.9	N/A
Total votes		60,674	100.0	

=== District 22 ===
New Jersey general election, 1999
Party	Candidate	Votes	%	±%
Republican	Richard H. Bagger	24,405	50.4	▲17.9
Republican	Alan M. Augustine	24,004	49.6	▲17.8
Total votes		48,409	100.0	

=== District 23 ===
New Jersey general election, 1999
Party	Candidate	Votes	%	±%
Republican	Leonard Lance	27,770	34.4	▲1.7
Republican	Connie Myers	25,499	31.6	▲2.0
Democratic	Thomas E. Palmieri	14,762	18.3	▼1.4
Democratic	J. Rebecca Goff	12,637	15.7	▲0.2
Total votes		80,668	100.0	

=== District 24 ===
New Jersey general election, 1999
Party	Candidate	Votes	%	±%
Republican	E. Scott Garrett	22,444	42.3	▲2.6
Republican	Guy R. Gregg	21,479	40.5	▲3.4
Democratic	Edwin C. Selby	9,119	17.2	▲3.5
Total votes		53,042	100.0	

=== District 25 ===
New Jersey general election, 1999
Party	Candidate	Votes	%	±%
Republican	Rick Merkt	17,259	30.5	▼0.2
Republican	Michael Patrick Carroll	17,204	30.4	▼1.4
Democratic	Ronald J. Pellegrino	10,607	18.7	▲1.1
Democratic	Gerald A. Nunan	10,018	17.7	▲0.1
Conservative	James Spinosa	772	1.4	0.0
Conservative	Stephen Spinosa	750	1.3	▲0.2
Total votes		56,610	100.0	

=== District 26 ===
New Jersey general election, 1999
Party	Candidate	Votes	%	±%
Republican	Carol J. Murphy	19,150	33.1	▼1.5
Republican	Alex DeCroce	19,054	33.0	▼1.1
Democratic	Robert Dombrowski	9,027	15.6	▲1.4
Democratic	Michael J. Butchko	8,964	15.5	▲1.4
Conservative	Stephen A. Bauer	793	1.4	▼0.1
Conservative	Martin J. McGrath	789	1.4	▼0.1
Total votes		57,777	100.0	

=== District 27 ===
New Jersey general election, 1999
Party	Candidate	Votes	%	±%
Democratic	LeRoy J. Jones, Jr.	13,001	39.4	▼9.6
Democratic	Nia H. Gill	12,962	39.3	▼9.4
Republican	Patricia Loreto	3,521	10.7	N/A
Republican	Charles Davies	3,506	10.6	N/A
Total votes		32,990	100.0	

=== District 28 ===
New Jersey general election, 1999
Party	Candidate	Votes	%	±%
Democratic	Craig A. Stanley	9,546	40.0	▲0.4
Democratic	Wilfredo Caraballo	9,278	38.9	▼1.2
Republican	Hillary Dow	2,157	9.0	▼1.9
Republican	Steven Johnson	2,125	8.9	▲0.4
Pro Life Conservative	Jim Riley	389	1.6	N/A
Pro Life Conservative	Dick Hester	370	1.6	▲1.1
Total votes		23,865	100.0	

=== District 29 ===
New Jersey general election, 1999
Party	Candidate	Votes	%	±%
Democratic	William D. Payne	10,302	42.3	▼0.5
Democratic	Donald Tucker	10,192	41.9	▼0.8
Republican	Elaine Guarino	1,686	6.9	▲0.4
Republican	Tharien Arnold	1,548	6.4	▲0.3 (▲5.9)
Socialist Workers	Kari J. Sachs	319	1.3	▲1.0
Socialist Workers	Brock Satter	287	1.2	▲1.0
Total votes		24,334	100.0	

=== District 30 ===
New Jersey general election, 1999
Party	Candidate	Votes	%	±%
Republican	Joseph R. Malone	20,735	29.7	▲1.1
Republican	Melvin Cottrell	19,310	27.6	▼0.7
Democratic	Edward G. Werner	14,441	20.7	▲0.3
Democratic	Edward J. Choquette	13,429	19.2	▲0.5
Conservative	Kal Madgyesy	988	1.4	▼0.6
Conservative	Fred A. Rasiewicz	941	1.3	▼0.7
Total votes		69,844	100.0	

=== District 31 ===
New Jersey general election, 1999
Party	Candidate	Votes	%	±%
Democratic	Joseph Charles, Jr.	13,274	38.9	▲0.1
Democratic	Joseph V. Doria, Jr.	12,946	37.9	▼1.7
Republican	Richard Freda	4,474	13.1	▲2.2
Republican	Mofalc Meinga	3,467	10.1	▼0.6
Total votes		34,161	100.0	

=== District 32 ===
New Jersey general election, 1999
Party	Candidate	Votes	%	±%
Democratic	Anthony Impreveduto	18,111	38.4	▲4.8
Democratic	Joan Quigley	17,732	37.6	▲4.3
Republican	Thomas F. Corcoran	4,893	10.4	▼4.7
Republican	Louis S. Lusquinos, Jr.	4,193	8.9	▼5.3
Politicians Are Crooks	Edith M. Shaw	1,187	2.5	▲0.8
Politicians Are Crooks	Herbert H. Shaw	1,093	2.3	N/A
Total votes		47,209	100.0	

=== District 33 ===
New Jersey general election, 1999
Party	Candidate	Votes	%	±%
Democratic	Raul “Rudy” Garcia	18,448	41.7	▲4.8
Democratic	Albio Sires	17,492	39.5	▲3.8
Republican	Manuel E. Fernandez	3,835	8.7	▼5.1
Republican	Francisco S. Arrojo	3,459	7.8	▼5.8
Taking The Future	Yadira J. Diaz-Castro	1,020	2.3	N/A
Total votes		44,254	100.0	

=== District 34 ===
New Jersey general election, 1999
Party	Candidate	Votes	%	±%
Republican	Gerald Zecker	20,578	30.3	▲1.6
Republican	Marion Crecco	19,953	29.4	▲1.9
Democratic	Gerard J. "Gerry" DiStefano	14,544	21.4	▼2.0
Democratic	Robert M. Ruane	12,812	18.9	▼0.9
Total votes		67,887	100.0	

=== District 35 ===
New Jersey general election, 1999
Party	Candidate	Votes	%	±%
Democratic	Alfred Steele	14,223	33.4	▲2.2
Democratic	Nellie Pou	13,902	32.6	▲3.0
Republican	William A. DeStefano	7,424	17.4	▼2.4
Republican	Belinda A. Lanier	7,032	16.5	▼2.9
Total votes		42,581	100.0	

=== District 36 ===
New Jersey general election, 1999
Party	Candidate	Votes	%	±%
Republican	Paul DiGaetano	16,682	29.1	▲3.3
Republican	John V. Kelly	16,281	28.4	▲2.5
Democratic	Rocco Mazza	12,172	21.2	▼3.5
Democratic	Kenneth M. Sorkin	12,162	21.2	▼2.4
Total votes		57,297	100.0	

=== District 37 ===
New Jersey general election, 1999
Party	Candidate	Votes	%	±%
Democratic	Loretta Weinberg	19,694	35.2	▲2.2
Democratic	Ken Zisa	18,971	33.9	▲2.6
Republican	Richard J. Bohan, Sr.	8,817	15.7	▼1.6
Republican	Sharon Hes	8,526	15.2	▼1.5
Total votes		56,008	100.0	

=== District 38 ===
New Jersey general election, 1999
Party	Candidate	Votes	%	±%
Republican	Rose Marie Heck	17,734	27.5	▼0.5
Republican	Guy F. Talarico	17,620	27.3	▲1.0
Democratic	Helene Herbert	14,307	22.2	▼0.2
Democratic	Robert Riccardella	13,972	21.7	▼0.5
Independent - Progressive	Michael Perrone, Jr.	899	1.4	N/A
Total votes		64,532	100.0	

=== District 39 ===
New Jersey general election, 1999
Party	Candidate	Votes	%	±%
Republican	Charlotte Vandervalk	26,659	30.6	▼2.2
Republican	John E. Rooney	25,991	29.8	▼2.1
Democratic	Michael Kasparian	16,202	18.6	▲1.7
Democratic	Ilan Plawker	15,931	18.3	▲1.7
Spirit of Service	Linda A. Mercurio	1,076	1.2	N/A
Conservative	Judith Klein	394	0.5	▼0.2
Conservative	Michael Koontz	349	0.4	▼0.3
"Sworn to Reform"	George E. Soroka	266	0.3	N/A
"Sworn to Reform"	Jeffrey C. Hogue	239	0.3	N/A
Total votes		87,107	100.0	

=== District 40 ===
New Jersey general election, 1999
Party	Candidate	Votes	%	±%
Republican	Nicholas R. Felice	21,175	30.6	▼3.1
Republican	David C. Russo	20,897	30.2	▼2.8
Democratic	Frank Del Vecchio	13,528	19.6	▲3.6
Democratic	Joshua Levine	12,820	18.5	▲2.8
Conservative	Robert I. Unanue	705	1.0	▲0.1
Total votes		69,125	100.0	
