= 2001 New Jersey Senate election =

2001 New Jersey Senate elections
- November 5, 2001

All 40 seats in the New Jersey State Senate 21 seats needed for a majority
- Turnout: 49% (▼7pp)

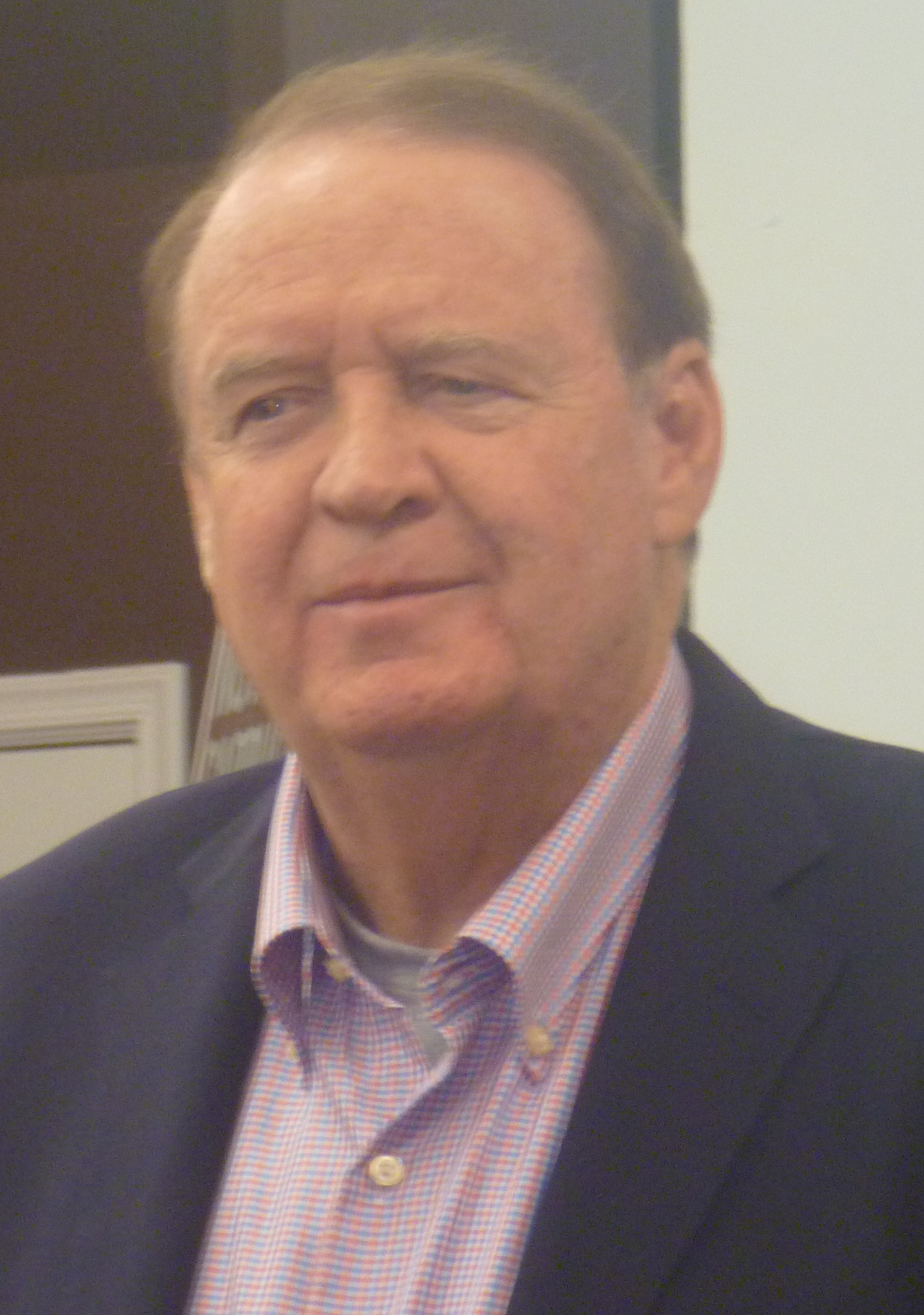
	Majority party	Minority party
Leader	Donald DiFrancesco (retired)	Richard Codey
Party	Republican	Democratic
Leader since	January 14, 1992	January 12, 1998
Leader's seat	22nd (Warren Township)	27th (West Orange)
Last election	24	16
Seats before	24	15
Seats won	20	20
Seat change	▼4	▲5
Popular vote	1,014,900	1,043,280
Percentage	48.9%	50.3%
- Results by district Democratic hold Democratic gain Republican hold
Senate President before election
Donald DiFrancesco
Republican
Elected Senate President
John O. Bennett and Richard Codey

The 2001 New Jersey Senate election was held on November 6. The election took place alongside Jim McGreevey's landslide election as Governor of New Jersey and were held in the immediate aftermath of the September 11 attacks, which killed 750 New Jerseyans and impacted many others. Under a newly redrawn map, Democrats gained five seats to split control of the Senate evenly. Democrats flipped districts 3 (after the incumbent switched parties earlier in the year), 18 (which was vacant), 22, 34, and 38.

A power-sharing agreement was reached with John O. Bennett and Richard Codey as co-presidents of the Senate. This is the last time Democrats did not win an outright majority of New Jersey State Senate seats, as well as the last time any Senate seats in North Jersey changed parties.

Contents
Incumbents not running • Summary of results
By District: 1 • 2 • 3 • 4 • 5 • 6 • 7 • 8 • 9 • 10 • 11 • 12 • 13 • 14 • 15 • 16 • 17 • 18 • 19 • 20 • 21 • 22 • 23 • 24 • 25 • 26 • 27 • 28 • 29 • 30 • 31 • 32 • 33 • 34 • 35 • 36 • 37 • 38 • 39 • 40

== Background ==
=== Redistricting ===
1992–02

2002–2012

New Jersey Legislature before (left) and after (right) the 2001 redistricting

As required, the New Jersey legislature redistricted its state legislative districts in advance of the 2001 election. Most Senators remained in their existing districts, though Senator Kevin J. O'Toole was redistricted to the 40th district and chose not to challenge.

The new map was based on a revised Democratic map chosen by Professor Larry Bartels of Princeton University, the non-partisan member of the reapportionment commission.

Republicans challenged the district map under the Voting Rights Act of 1965, arguing that by shifting some African-American and Hispanic voters out of three predominantly minority districts in and around Newark and spreading them to other, mostly white districts, the plan diluted minority voting strength. The case was rejected by the U.S. Court for the District of New Jersey. The Republican suit was dismissed partly under the influence of the near-unanimous support of New Jersey's incumbent minority legislators for the Democratic claim that their map would result in more minority representation, rather than less.

== Incumbents not running for re-election ==
=== Democratic ===
- John A. Lynch Jr. (District 17)

=== Republican ===
- Jack Sinagra (District 18) (resigned October 23)
- Kevin O'Toole (District 21) (redistricted into District 40; ran for Assembly)
- Donald DiFrancesco (District 22) (ran for Governor)
- William E. Schluter (District 23) (redistricted into District 15; ran for Governor as an independent)

== Summary of results by State Senate district ==
District	Incumbent	Party	Elected Senator	Party
1st Legislative District	James Cafiero	Rep	James Cafiero	Rep
2nd Legislative District	William Gormley	Rep	William Gormley	Rep
3rd Legislative District	Raymond Zane	Rep (Note: Senator Zane switched from the Democratic Party to the Republican Party in February 2001.)	Steve Sweeney	Dem
4th Legislative District	John Matheussen	Rep	John Matheussen	Rep
5th Legislative District	Wayne R. Bryant	Dem	Wayne R. Bryant	Dem
6th Legislative District	John Adler	Dem	John Adler	Dem
7th Legislative District	Diane Allen	Rep	Diane Allen	Rep
8th Legislative District	Martha W. Bark	Rep	Martha W. Bark	Rep
9th Legislative District	Leonard T. Connors	Rep	Leonard T. Connors	Rep
10th Legislative District	Andrew R. Ciesla	Rep	Andrew R. Ciesla	Rep
11th Legislative District	Joseph A. Palaia	Rep	Joseph A. Palaia	Rep
12th Legislative District	John O. Bennett	Rep	John O. Bennett	Rep
13th Legislative District	Joe Kyrillos	Rep	Joe Kyrillos	Rep
14th Legislative District	Peter Inverso	Rep	Peter Inverso	Rep
15th Legislative District	Shirley Turner	Dem	Shirley Turner	Dem
16th Legislative District	Walter J. Kavanaugh	Rep	Walter J. Kavanaugh	Rep
17th Legislative District	John A. Lynch Jr.	Dem	Bob Smith	Dem
18th Legislative District	Vacant (Note: Senator Jack Sinagra resigned on October 23, 2001, to become chairman of the Port Authority of New York and New Jersey.)		Barbara Buono	Dem
19th Legislative District	Joe Vitale	Dem	Joe Vitale	Dem
20th Legislative District	Raymond Lesniak	Dem	Raymond Lesniak	Dem
21st Legislative District	Kevin O'Toole (Note: O'Toole was appointed to the Senate after Senator C. Louis Bassano resigned to join the New Jersey Sports and Exposition Authority.) (Note: Redistricted to 40th district.)	Rep	Richard Bagger	Rep
22nd Legislative District	Donald DiFrancesco	Rep	Joseph Suliga	Dem
23rd Legislative District	William E. Schluter	Rep	Leonard Lance	Rep
24th Legislative District	Robert Littell	Rep	Robert Littell	Rep
25th Legislative District	Anthony Bucco	Rep	Anthony Bucco	Rep
26th Legislative District	Robert Martin	Rep	Robert Martin	Rep
27th Legislative District	Richard Codey	Dem	Richard Codey	Dem
28th Legislative District	Ronald Rice	Dem	Ronald Rice	Dem
29th Legislative District	Sharpe James (Note: James was appointed in June 1999 to complete the unexpired term of Senator Wynona Lipman. He won a special election for the seat in 1999.)	Dem	Sharpe James	Dem
30th Legislative District	Robert W. Singer	Rep	Robert W. Singer	Rep
31st Legislative District	Edward T. O'Connor Jr.	Dem	Joseph Charles	Dem
32nd Legislative District	Nicholas Sacco	Dem	Nicholas Sacco	Dem
33rd Legislative District	Bernard Kenny	Dem	Bernard Kenny	Dem
34th Legislative District	Norman M. Robertson	Rep	Nia Gill	Dem
35th Legislative District	John Girgenti	Dem	John Girgenti	Dem
36th Legislative District	Garry Furnari	Dem	Garry Furnari	Dem
37th Legislative District	Byron Baer	Dem	Byron Baer	Dem
38th Legislative District	Louis F. Kosco	Rep	Joseph Coniglio	Dem
39th Legislative District	Gerald Cardinale	Rep	Gerald Cardinale	Rep
40th Legislative District	Henry McNamara	Rep	Henry McNamara	Rep

=== Close races ===
Seats where the margin of victory was under 10%:

1. Legislative District 1, 0.8%
2. Legislative District 3, 3.0% gain
3. Legislative District 7, 8.2%
4. Legislative District 14, 4.2%
5. Legislative District 36, 3.0%
6. Legislative District 38, 6.2% gain

== District 1 ==
=== General election ===
==== Candidates ====
- James Cafiero, incumbent Senator since 1990 (Note: Cafiero had previously served a term in the Senate from 1972 to 1982.) (Republican)
- William J. Hughes Jr., federal antitrust prosecutor and son of former U.S. Representative William J. Hughes (Democratic)

==== Results ====
New Jersey general election, 2001
Party	Candidate	Votes	%
Republican	James Cafiero (incumbent)	31,150	50.4
Democratic	William J. Hughes, Jr.	30,709	49.6
Total votes		61,859	100.00%

== District 2 ==
=== General election ===
==== Candidates ====
- David Alcantara (Green)
- Bill Gormley, incumbent Senator since 1982 (Republican)

==== Results ====
New Jersey general election, 2001
Party	Candidate	Votes	%
Republican	William Gormley (incumbent)	34,786	86.5
Green	David Alcantara	5,411	13.5
Total votes		40,197	100.00%

== District 3 ==
=== General election ===
==== Candidates ====
- Stephen Sweeney, ironworker and Gloucester County Freeholder (Democratic)
- Raymond Zane, incumbent Senator since 1974 (Republican)

==== Results ====
New Jersey general election, 2001
Party	Candidate	Votes	%
Democratic	Stephen M. Sweeney	29,873	51.5
Republican	Raymond Zane (incumbent)	28,138	48.5
Total votes		58,011	100.00%

== District 4 ==
=== General election ===
==== Candidates ====
- Joseph L. Manganello (Democratic)
- John Matheussen, incumbent Senator since 1992 (Republican)

==== Results ====
New Jersey general election, 2001
Party	Candidate	Votes	%
Republican	John J. Matheussen (incumbent)	28,530	58.2
Democratic	Joseph L. Manganello	20,451	41.8
Total votes		48,981	100.00%

== District 5 ==
=== General election ===
==== Candidates ====
- Wayne R. Bryant, incumbent Senator since 1995 (Democratic)
- Maryann T. Callahan (Republican)

==== Results ====
New Jersey general election, 2001
Party	Candidate	Votes	%
Democratic	Wayne R. Bryant (incumbent)	29,568	69.3
Republican	Maryann T. Callahan	13,087	30.7
Total votes		42,655	100.00%

== District 6 ==
=== General election ===
==== Candidates ====
- John Adler, incumbent Senator since 1992 (Democratic)
- Jane A. Greenfogel (Republican)

==== Results ====
New Jersey general election, 2001
Party	Candidate	Votes	%
Democratic	John Adler (incumbent)	39,336	66.7
Republican	Jane A. Greenfogel	19,635	33.3
Total votes		58,971	100.00%

== District 7 ==
=== General election ===
==== Candidates ====
- Diane Allen, incumbent Senator since 1998 (Republican)
- Lou Gallagher, U.S. Navy SEAL (Democratic)

==== Results ====
New Jersey general election, 2001
Party	Candidate	Votes	%
Republican	Diane Allen (incumbent)	29,756	54.1
Democratic	Lou Gallagher	25,293	45.9
Total votes		55,049	100.00%

== District 8 ==
=== General election ===
==== Candidates ====
- Martha W. Bark, incumbent Senator since 1997 (Republican)
- Gary E. Haman (Democratic)

==== Results ====
New Jersey general election, 2001
Party	Candidate	Votes	%
Republican	Martha W. Bark (incumbent)	35,276	60.7
Democratic	Gary E. Haman	22,865	39.3
Total votes		58,141	100.00%

== District 9 ==
=== General election ===
==== Candidates ====
- Leonard T. Connors, incumbent Senator since 1982 and mayor of Surf City (Republican)
- Mark Schreckstein (Common Sense Independent)
- Peter A. Terranova (Democratic)

==== Results ====
New Jersey general election, 2001
Party	Candidate	Votes	%
Republican	Leonard T. Connors (incumbent)	43,303	58.7%
Democratic	Peter A. Terranova	29,885	40.5%
Common Sense Independent	Mark Schreckenstein	588	0.8%
Total votes		73,776	100.00%

== District 10 ==
=== General election ===
==== Candidates ====
- Andrew R. Ciesla, incumbent Senator since 1992 (Republican)
- Timothy E. Ryan (Democratic)

==== Results ====
New Jersey general election, 2001
Party	Candidate	Votes	%
Republican	Andrew R. Ciesla (incumbent)	36,329	56.8%
Democratic	Timothy E. Ryan	27,609	43.2%
Total votes		63,938	100.00%

== District 11 ==
=== General election ===
==== Candidates ====
- Maureen O'Rourke (Democratic)
- Joseph A. Palaia, incumbent Senator since 1989 and president pro tempore of the New Jersey Senate (Republican)

==== Results ====
New Jersey general election, 2001
Party	Candidate	Votes	%
Republican	Joseph A. Palaia (incumbent)	36,385	62.0%
Democratic	Maureen O'Rourke	22,261	38.0%
Total votes		58,646	100.00%

== District 12 ==
=== General election ===
==== Candidates ====
- John O. Bennett, incumbent Senator since 1989 and Senate Majority Leader (Republican)
- Amy I. Aughenbaugh (Democratic)

==== Results ====
New Jersey general election, 2001
Party	Candidate	Votes	%
Republican	John O. Bennett (incumbent)	34,464	58.8%
Democratic	Amy I. Aughenbaugh	24,189	41.2%
Total votes		58,653	100.00%

== District 13 ==
=== General election ===
==== Candidates ====
- Kiran Desai, Old Bridge accountant (Democratic)
- Joe Kyrillos, incumbent Senator since 1992 (Republican)

==== Results ====
New Jersey general election, 2001
Party	Candidate	Votes	%
Republican	Joe Kyrillos (incumbent)	38,089	64.4%
Democratic	Kiran Desai	21,066	35.6%
Total votes		59,155	100.00%

== District 14 ==
=== General election ===
==== Candidates ====
- Peter Inverso, incumbent Senator since 1992 (Republican)
- Samuel Plumeri Jr., Mercer County Freeholder (Democratic)

==== Results ====
New Jersey general election, 2001
Party	Candidate	Votes	%
Republican	Peter Inverso (incumbent)	32,034	52.1%
Democratic	Sam Plumeri Jr.	29,458	47.9%
Total votes		61,492	100.00%

== District 15 ==
=== General election ===
==== Candidates ====
- Thomas D. Abrams (Libertarian)
- Norbert E. Donelly (Republican)
- Shirley Turner, incumbent Senator since 1998 (Democratic)

==== Results ====
New Jersey general election, 2001
Party	Candidate	Votes	%
Democratic	Shirley Turner (incumbent)	32,289	69.1%
Republican	Norbert E. Donelly	13,871	29.7%
Libertarian	Thomas D. Abrams	563	1.2%
Total votes		46,723	100.00%

== District 16 ==
=== General election ===
==== Candidates ====
- Walter J. Kavanaugh, incumbent Senator since 1998 (Republican)
- Daniel Wartenberg (Democratic)

==== Results ====
New Jersey general election, 2001
Party	Candidate	Votes	%
Republican	Walter J. Kavanaugh (incumbent)	39,073	66.6%
Democratic	Daniel Wartenberg	19,589	33.4%
Total votes		58,662	100.00%

== District 17 ==
=== General election ===
==== Candidates ====
- Skip House (Republican)
- Bob Smith, member of the General Assembly and former mayor of Piscataway (Democratic)

==== Results ====
New Jersey general election, 2001
Party	Candidate	Votes	%
Democratic	Bob Smith	29,290	68.9
Republican	Matthew "Skip" House	13,216	31.1
Total votes		42,506	100.00%

== District 18 ==
=== General election ===
==== Candidates ====
- Barbara Buono, member of the General Assembly (Democratic)
- John G. Cito (Republican)

==== Results ====
New Jersey general election, 2001
Party	Candidate	Votes	%
Democratic	Barbara Buono	33,487	65.0
Republican	John G. Cito	18,064	35.0
Total votes		51,551	100.00%

== District 19 ==
=== General election ===
==== Candidates ====
- Naresh Gidwani (Republican)
- Joe Vitale, incumbent Senator since 1998 (Democratic)

==== Results ====
New Jersey general election, 2001
Party	Candidate	Votes	%
Democratic	Joe Vitale (incumbent)	37,322	77.4%
Republican	Naresh "Nick" Gidwani	10,928	22.6%
Total votes		48,250	100.00%

== District 20 ==
=== General election ===
==== Candidates ====
- Raymond Lesniak, incumbent Senator since 1983 (Democratic)
- Daniel M. Nozza (Schundler for Governor)

==== Results ====
New Jersey general election, 2001
Party	Candidate	Votes	%
Democratic	Raymond J. Lesniak	22,817	80.0%
Schundler for Governor	Daniel M. Nozza	5,698	20.0%
Total votes		28,515	100.0

== District 21 ==
=== General election ===
==== Candidates ====
- Richard Bagger, member of the General Assembly since 1992 (Republican)
- Ellen Steinberg (Democratic)

==== Results ====
New Jersey general election, 2001
Party	Candidate	Votes	%
Republican	Richard Bagger	41,539	58.6%
Democratic	Ellen Steinberg	29,342	41.4%
Total votes		70,881	100.00%

== District 22 ==
=== General election ===
==== Candidates ====
- Milt Campbell, former Olympic decathlete and professional football player (Republican)
- Joseph Suliga, member of the General Assembly since 1994 (Democratic)

==== Results ====
New Jersey general election, 2001
Party	Candidate	Votes	%
Democratic	Joseph S. Suliga	29,326	59.1
Republican	Milton Campbell	20,330	40.9
Total votes		49,656	100.00%

== District 23 ==
=== General election ===
==== Candidates ====
- Frederick P. Cook (Democratic)
- Leonard Lance, member of the General Assembly since 1991 and son of former Senator Wesley Lance (Republican)

==== Results ====
New Jersey general election, 2001
Party	Candidate	Votes	%
Republican	Leonard Lance	43,721	69.3
Democratic	Frederick P. Cook	19,407	30.7
Total votes		63,128	100.00%

== District 24 ==
=== General election ===
==== Candidates ====
- Robert Littell, incumbent Senator since 1990 (Republican)
- Edwin Selby (Democratic)

==== Results ====
New Jersey general election, 2001
Party	Candidate	Votes	%
Republican	Robert Littell (incumbent)	41,019	74.4%
Democratic	Edwin Selby	14,117	25.6%
Total votes		55,136	100.00%

== District 25 ==
=== General election ===
==== Candidates ====
- Anthony Bucco, incumbent Senator since 1998 (Republican)
- Horace Chamberlain (Democratic)

==== Results ====
New Jersey general election, 2001
Party	Candidate	Votes	%
Republican	Anthony R. Bucco (incumbent)	38,020	65.5%
Democratic	Horace Chamberlain	20,017	34.5%
Total votes		58,037	100.00%

== District 26 ==
=== General election ===
==== Candidates ====
- Robert Martin, incumbent Senator since 1993 (Republican)
- Paul E. Pinney (Democratic)

==== Results ====
New Jersey general election, 2001
Party	Candidate	Votes	%
Republican	Robert Martin (incumbent)	38,779	65.9%
Democratic	Paul E. Pinney	20,090	34.1%
Total votes		58,869	100.00%

== District 27 ==
=== General election ===
==== Candidates ====
- Richard Codey, incumbent Senator since 1982 (Democratic)
- Donald Page (African-Americans for Justice)
- Jared Silverman (Republican)

==== Results ====
New Jersey general election, 2001
Party	Candidate	Votes	%
Democratic	Richard J. Codey	35,237	64.7
Republican	Jared Silverman	17,871	32.8
African-Americans For Justice	Donald Page	1,359	2.5
Total votes		54,467	100.00%

== District 28 ==
=== General election ===
==== Candidates ====
- Brian E. Coleman (Independent)
- Marion Crecco, member of the General Assembly since 1986 (Republican)
- Ronald Rice, incumbent Senator since 1986 (Democratic)

==== Results ====
New Jersey general election, 2001
Party	Candidate	Votes	%
Democratic	Ronald Rice (incumbent)	27,294	69.4%
Republican	Marion Crecco	11,646	29.6%
Independent	Brian E. Coleman	403	1.0
Total votes		39,343	100.00%

== District 29 ==
=== General election ===
==== Candidates ====
- Sharpe James, incumbent Senator since 1999 and mayor of Newark (Democratic)

==== Results ====
New Jersey general election, 2001
Party	Candidate	Votes	%
Democratic	Sharpe James (incumbent)	25,510	100.0%
Total votes		25,510	100.00%

== District 30 ==
=== General election ===
==== Candidates ====
- Timothy J. Konopka (Democratic)
- Robert Singer, incumbent Senator since 1993 (Republican)

==== Results ====
New Jersey general election, 2001
Party	Candidate	Votes	%
Republican	Robert Singer (incumbent)	31,671	61.7%
Democratic	Timothy J. Konopka	19,690	38.3%
Total votes		51,361	100.00%

== District 31 ==
=== General election ===
==== Candidates ====
- Joseph Charles, member of the General Assembly since 1982 (Democratic)
- Martin J. McFadden (Republican)

==== Results ====
New Jersey general election, 2001
Party	Candidate	Votes	%
Democratic	Joseph Charles	29,401	74.1%
Republican	Martin J. McFadden	10,250	25.9%
Total votes		39,651	100.00%

== District 32 ==
=== General election ===
==== Candidates ====
- Martin J. McFadden (Republican)
- Nicholas Sacco, incumbent Senator since 1994 and mayor of North Bergen (Democratic)
- Herbert H. Shaw, perennial candidate (Politicians are Crooks)
- Louis Vernotico (Eliminate Primary Elections)

==== Results ====
New Jersey general election, 2001
Party	Candidate	Votes	%
Democratic	Nicholas Sacco (incumbent)	26,991	69.0%
Republican	Frank MacCormack	11,514	29.4%
Politicians Are Crooks	Herbert H. Shaw	396	1.0%
Eliminate Primary Elections	Louis Vernotico	196	0.5%
Total votes		39,097	100.00%

== District 33 ==
=== General election ===
==== Candidates ====
- Bernard Kenny, incumbent Senator since 1993 (Democratic)
- Nancy Gaynor (Republican)

==== Results ====
New Jersey general election, 2001
Party	Candidate	Votes	%
Democratic	Bernard Kenny (incumbent)	28,659	75.3%
Republican	Nancy Gaynor	9,378	24.7%
Total votes		38,037	100.00%

== District 34 ==
=== General election ===
==== Candidates ====
- Nia Gill, member of the General Assembly since 1994 (Democratic)
- Norman M. Robertson, incumbent Senator since 1998 (Republican)
- Marie Yvrose Celestin (Social Economic Empowerment)

==== Results ====
New Jersey general election, 2001
Party	Candidate	Votes	%
Democratic	Nia Gill	30,453	64.9%
Republican	Norman M. Robertson (incumbent)	16,135	34.4%
Social Economic Empowerment	Marie Yvrose Celestin	368	0.8
Total votes		46,956	100.00%

== District 35 ==
=== General election ===
==== Candidates ====
- John Girgenti, incumbent Senator since 1990 (Democratic)

==== Results ====
New Jersey general election, 2001
Party	Candidate	Votes	%
Democratic	John Girgenti (incumbent)	25,844	100.0%
Total votes		25,844	100.00%

== District 36 ==
=== General election ===
==== Candidates ====
- Joseph Farallo (Green Coalition)
- Garry Furnari, incumbent Senator since 1998 (Democratic)
- John V. Kelly, member of the General Assembly since 1986 (Note: Kelly previously served a term in the General Assembly from 1982 to 1984.) (Republican)

==== Results ====
New Jersey general election, 2001
Party	Candidate	Votes	%
Democratic	Garry Furnari (incumbent)	22,914	50.8%
Republican	John V. Kelly	21,571	47.8%
Green Coalition	Joseph Farallo	642	1.4
Total votes		45,127	100.00%

== District 37 ==
=== General election ===
==== Candidates ====
- Byron Baer, incumbent Senator since 1994 (Democratic)
- Jonathan L. Bender (Republican)

==== Results ====
New Jersey general election, 2001
Party	Candidate	Votes	%
Democratic	Byron Baer (incumbent)	33,650	66.4%
Republican	Jonathan L. Bender	17,037	33.6%
Total votes		50,687	100.00%

== District 38 ==
=== General election ===
==== Candidates ====
- Joseph Coniglio, former Paramus borough council president (Democratic)
- Louis F. Kosco, incumbent Senator since 1992 (Republican)

==== Results ====
New Jersey general election, 2001
Party	Candidate	Votes	%
Democratic	Joseph Coniglio	29,316	53.2%
Republican	Louis F. Kosco (incumbent)	25,773	46.8%
Total votes		55,089	100.00%

== District 39 ==
=== General election ===
==== Candidates ====
- Alan Baskin (Democratic)
- Gerald Cardinale, incumbent Senator since 1982 (Republican)
- George E. Soroka (Conservative)

==== Results ====
New Jersey general election, 2001
Party	Candidate	Votes	%
Republican	Gerald Cardinale (incumbent)	42,717	62.9%
Democratic	Alan Baskin	24,543	36.2%
Conservative	George E. Soroka	616	0.9%
Total votes		67,876	100.00%

== District 40 ==
=== General election ===
==== Candidates ====
- Henry McNamara, incumbent Senator since 1985 (Republican)
- Jack Nigro (Democratic)

==== Results ====
New Jersey general election, 2001
Party	Candidate	Votes	%
Republican	Henry McNamara (incumbent)	39,815	62.3%
Democratic	Jack Nigro	24,122	37.7%
Total votes		63,937	100.00%

== See also ==
- 2001 New Jersey General Assembly election
