= Robert Singer (American politician) =

Member of the New Jersey Senate

Robert W. Singer
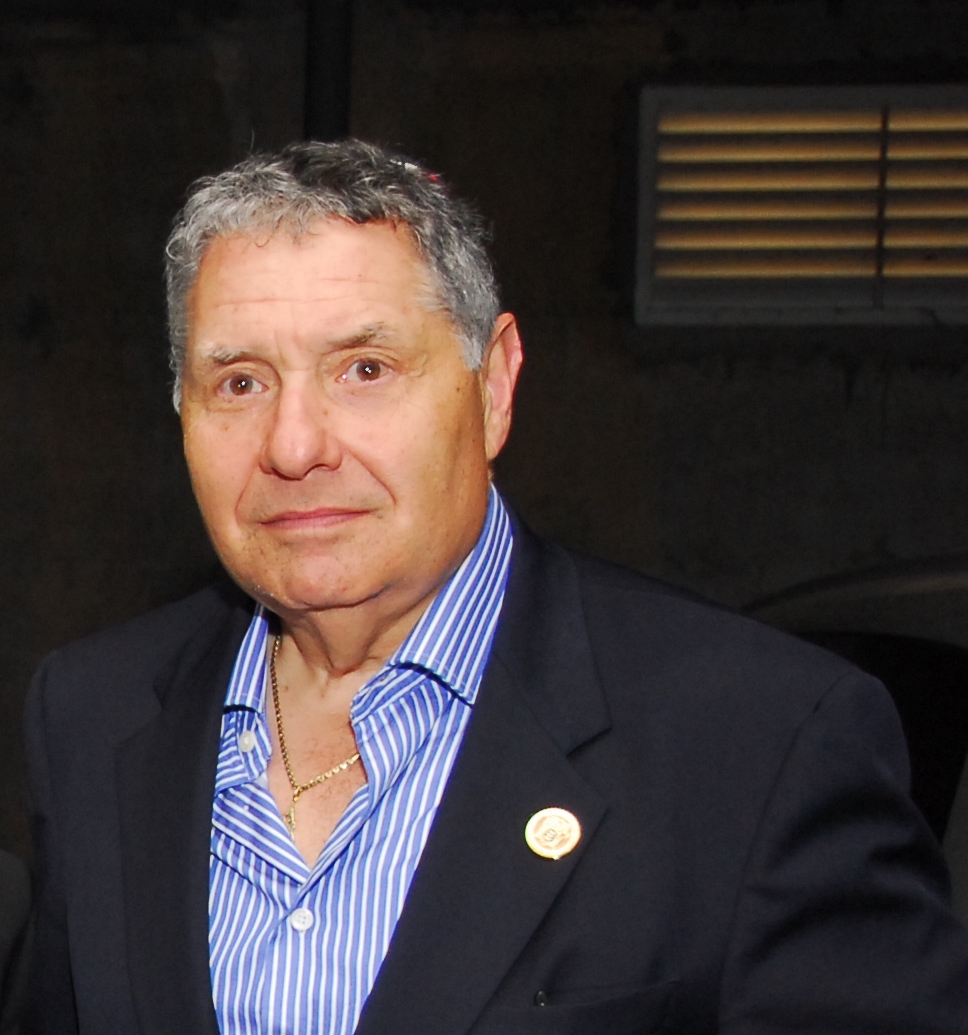

Member of the New Jersey Senate from the 30th district
- Incumbent
- Assumed office October 14, 1993
- Preceded by: John E. Dimon

Member of the New Jersey General Assembly
- In office January 14, 1986 – January 9, 1990 Serving with John Paul Doyle
- Preceded by: Marlene Lynch Ford
- Succeeded by: Marlene Lynch Ford
- Constituency: 10th district
- In office January 14, 1992 – October 14, 1993 Serving with Melvin Cottrell
- Preceded by: Marion Crecco; John V. Kelly
- Succeeded by: Joseph R. Malone
- Constituency: 30th district

Personal details
- Born: October 29, 1947 (age 78) New York City, U.S.
- Party: Republican
- Spouse: Caryl Singer
- Children: 4
- Website: Legislative web page

Robert W. Singer (born October 29, 1947) is an American Republican Party politician, who has represented the 30th Legislative District in the New Jersey Senate since 1993. He was the Mayor of Lakewood Township, New Jersey in 2009. He serves in the Senate as the Deputy Republican Leader (since 2018) and as the ranking member of the Health Committee. He is the most senior senator currently serving in the legislature.

== Personal life ==
Singer was born in New York City on October 29, 1947. He grew up in New York attending public schools there. From 1966 to 1972, he served in the U.S. Coast Guard Reserves. He married the former Caryl Lynn Russo and has four children, including Sarri Singer. He is a resident of Lakewood Township.

Robert Singer is Vice President of Corporate Relations, Community/Kimball Medical Center.

== Political career ==
Before entering New Jersey's Senate, Singer served in the lower house of the New Jersey Legislature, the General Assembly for two stints, once from 1986 to 1990 serving the Ocean County-based 10th district, and again from 1992 through 1993 in the 30th district which now stretched from Burlington County through Monmouth and Ocean counties. He sought re-election to his Assembly seat in 1989 but was defeated by incumbent Democrat John Paul Doyle and former Democratic Assemblywoman Marlene Lynch Ford (the latter of whom Singer defeated in the 1985 and 1987 elections). In the Assembly, Singer was the majority whip from 1992 to 1993. Senator Singer had served on the Lakewood Township Committee since 1981, and was its mayor in 1983, from 1985 to 1986, 1994, and again in 2009 until retiring in 2010. He has been on the Monmouth-Ocean Development Council board of directors since 2001 and from 1996 to 1999 and the Lakewood Municipal Utility Authority since 1999 as chair. He has served since 1999 on the Ocean County Board of Health as its vice chair. Singer serves on the board of trustees of Georgian Court University in Lakewood and is a member of the board of directors of the Monmouth-Ocean Development Council.

Incumbent 30th district State Senator John E. Dimon announced that he would not seek re-election in 1993 due to poor health. Singer ran in the primary unopposed and became the Republican nominee for the November general election. After Dimon died in September 1993, Singer was selected by Republican committee members of the district to serve Dimon’s unexpired Senate term ending January 11, 1994 and was sworn into office on October 14, 1993. Singer had simultaneously held a seat in the New Jersey Senate and served as Mayor until 2010 when he chose to not seek re-election to the Lakewood Township Committee. Singer had been a member of the Township Committee for nearly thirty years. Prior to retiring from the Lakewood Township Committee, dual office holding was allowed under a grandfather clause in the state law enacted by the New Jersey Legislature and signed into law by Governor of New Jersey Jon Corzine in September 2007 that prevents dual-office-holding but allows those who had held both positions as of February 1, 2008, to retain both posts.

In the Senate, Singer served as the Co-Republican Majority Leader from 2002 to 2003 and as the Assistant Majority Leader from 1997 to 2001. Singer serves on the Legislative Services Commission, the Commerce Committee and the Health, Human Services and Senior Citizens Committee. Singer currently serves on the New Jersey Commission on Aging, the New Jersey Commission on Science and Technology and the New Jersey Asian American Commission. Singer has been the sponsor of various economic development measures, including bills to assist biotechnology and computer software firms, and to authorize the creation of Urban Enterprise Zones in the district.

=== Committees ===
Committee assignments for the 2024—2025 Legislative Session are:

- Commerce
- Health, Human Services and Senior Citizens
- Higher Education
- Legislative Oversight

=== District 30 ===
Each of the 40 districts in the New Jersey Legislature has one representative in the New Jersey Senate and two members in the New Jersey General Assembly. The representatives from the 30th District for the 2024—2025 Legislative Session are:

- Senator Robert Singer (R)
- Assemblyman Sean T. Kean (R)
- Assemblyman Avi Schnall (D)

== Election history ==
30th Legislative District General Election, 2023
Party	Candidate	Votes	%
Republican	Robert W. Singer (incumbent)	37,998	80.6
Democratic	Stephen Dobbins	9,123	19.4
Total votes		47,121	100.0
Republican hold			

2021 New Jersey general election
Party	Candidate	Votes	%	±%
Republican	Robert W. Singer	53,130	71.2	▲11.0
Democratic	Dan Stinger	21,506	28.8	▼11.0
Total votes		74,636	100.0	

New Jersey general election, 2017
Party	Candidate	Votes	%	±%
Republican	Robert W. Singer	30,735	60.2	▼10.0
Democratic	Amy Sara Cores	20,343	39.8	▲10.0
Total votes		51,078	100.0	

New Jersey general election, 2013
Party	Candidate	Votes	%	±%
Republican	Robert W. Singer	36,563	70.2	▲4.3
Democratic	William H. Field	15,535	29.8	▼4.3
Total votes		52,098	100.0	

2011 New Jersey general election
Party	Candidate	Votes	%
Republican	Robert W. Singer	21,990	65.9
Democratic	Steve Morlino	11,376	34.1
Total votes		33,366	100.0

2007 New Jersey general election
Party	Candidate	Votes	%	±%
Republican	Robert W. Singer	23,072	61.6	▼1.0
Democratic	Steven Morlino	14,365	38.4	▲1.0
Total votes		37,437	100.0	

2003 New Jersey general election
Party	Candidate	Votes	%	±%
Republican	Robert W. Singer	24,637	62.6	▲0.9
Democratic	Steven Morlino	14,713	37.4	▼0.9
Total votes		39,350	100.0	

2001 New Jersey general election
Party	Candidate	Votes	%
Republican	Robert W. Singer	31,671	61.7
Democratic	Timothy J. Konopka	19,690	38.3
Total votes		51,361	100.0

1997 New Jersey general election
Party	Candidate	Votes	%	±%
Republican	Robert W. Singer	27,837	53.7	▼12.0
Democratic	Kenneth A. Kurtz	20,815	40.2	▲5.9
Libertarian	Bob Mondgock	1,932	3.7	N/A
Conservative	Fred Rasiewicz	1,208	2.3	N/A
Total votes		51,792	100.0	

1993 New Jersey general election
Party	Candidate	Votes	%	±%
Republican	Robert W. Singer	32,678	65.7	▲0.7
Democratic	Lyle M. (Peggi) Sturmfels	17,047	34.3	▼0.7
Total votes		49,725	100.0	

New Jersey Senate
Preceded by John E. Dimon	Member of the New Jersey Senate for the 30th District; October 14, 1993 – present	Succeeded by Incumbent
New Jersey General Assembly
Preceded by Marion Crecco; John V. Kelly	Member of the New Jersey General Assembly for the 30th District; January 14, 1992 – October 14, 1993; With: Melvin Cottrell	Succeeded by Joseph R. Malone
Preceded by Marlene Lynch Ford	Member of the New Jersey General Assembly for the 10th District; January 14, 1986 – January 9, 1990; With: John Paul Doyle	Succeeded by Marlene Lynch Ford
