= John Spoltore =

John Spoltore could refer to:

- John J. Spoltore (1921–1973), American politician
- John Spoltore (ice hockey) (1971–2010), American professional ice hockey player
