= John Cali =

John Cali may refer to:

- John J. Cali (1918–2014), American real estate developer
- John F. Cali (1928–1992), American politician in the New Jersey General Assembly
