= Buddy Fortunato =

American politician (born 1946)

A. Joseph "Buddy" Fortunato

Member of the New Jersey General Assembly from the 27th district
- In office January 10, 1978 – January 12, 1982
- Preceded by: John N. Dennis
- Succeeded by: Mildred Barry Garvin; Harry A. McEnroe

Member of the New Jersey General Assembly from the 30th district
- In office January 12, 1982 – January 13, 1986
- Preceded by: Michael F. Adubato; Anthony Imperiale
- Succeeded by: Marion Crecco; John V. Kelly

Personal details
- Born: March 19, 1946 (age 80) Orange, New Jersey
- Party: Democratic
- Education: Rider College
- Occupation: Newspaper publisher

Angelo Joseph Fortunato (born March 19, 1946), also known as Buddy Fortunato, is an American newspaper publisher and Democratic Party politician who served four terms in the New Jersey General Assembly.

== Biography ==
Fortunato was born in Orange, New Jersey in 1946. He graduated from Montclair High School where he received all-state high school honors in baseball and football. He then attended Rider College where he graduated in 1968. Since 1971, he has been executive of The Italian Tribune, a Newark-based publication focused primarily on Italian American culture.

In 1977, Fortunato, a resident of Glen Ridge, was elected to the General Assembly from the 27th district encompassing the northern suburbs of Essex County. He came in second place behind incumbent Republican Carl Orechio. In the next election in 1979, Fortunato placed first in the election ahead of Orechio. After redistricting in 1981, the northern Essex district was slightly reconfigured and renumbered the 30th district. Fortunato came in first in the 1981 election ahead of Republican John V. Kelly. He again was reelected in 1983 but for the first time his Democratic running mate, Steve Adubato Jr., was also elected. During the 1984–1985 Assembly session, he was chairman of the Committee on Independent Authorities and Commissions and vice chair of the Transportation and Communications Committee.

In April 1985, he was indicted on allegedly accepting a bribe of $2,000 in exchange for getting the sons of Clifton resident Vito Maglione jobs at the New Jersey Turnpike Authority. The indictment plus the strong coattails of Republican Thomas Kean in the gubernatorial election led to the defeat of Fortunato and Adubato by Republicans Kelly and Marion Crecco. Fortunato was later acquitted of the bribery charges in 1987 and attempted to stage a comeback to the Assembly in 1989. However, he was narrowly defeated in the general election by Kelly and Crecco.
