= Joseph R. Malone =

American politician (born 1949)

Joseph R. Malone III

Member of the New Jersey General Assembly from the 30th district
- In office October 14, 1993 – January 10, 2012
- Preceded by: Robert Singer
- Succeeded by: Dave Rible; Sean T. Kean

Mayor of Bordentown
- In office May 1973 – May 1993
- In office May 14, 2013 – May 14, 2017
- Preceded by: James E. Lynch Jr.
- Succeeded by: James E. Lynch Jr.

Personal details
- Born: October 1, 1949 (age 77) Trenton, New Jersey, U.S.
- Party: Republican (formerly Democratic)
- Spouse: Valerie Petranto
- Children: two
- Education: Trenton State College (B.S. and M.Ed.)

Joseph R. Malone III (born October 1, 1949) is an American Republican Party politician who served in the New Jersey General Assembly from 1993 until 2012, representing the 30th Legislative District and is a long-time mayor of the City of Bordentown.

== Biography ==
Malone received a B.S. from Trenton State College (now The College of New Jersey) and was awarded an M.Ed. from Trenton State College in Industrial Education. He was born in Trenton, and currently resides in Bordentown.

Malone has served on the Bordentown Sewerage Authority since 1986. He was the Bordentown City Director of Public Works from 1973 to 1997. Malone served as Mayor of Bordentown from 1973 to 1993 and was its Deputy Mayor from 1993 to 1997 following his appointment to the Assembly. At the time of his first election in 1973, he was the youngest mayor of Bordentown. Malone has served as the director of post-secondary and adult education and apprentice coordinator at Somerset County Technical Institute in Bridgewater.

Early in his political career, Malone was a Democrat and was one of the party's nominees for the General Assembly in 1979 in the 8th Legislative District. However, later he became a Republican and was selected by the 30th District's Republican county committees to fill the remainder of Robert Singer's unexpired 1992–93 term in the General Assembly after Singer resigned his seat to fill a State Senate vacancy created when John E. Dimon did not run for re-election and later died. Malone was the Assembly's Budget Officer from 2004 to January 2011, and was the Assistant Majority Whip from 2000 to 2001. He served in the Assembly on the Budget Committee, Education Committee, Higher Education Committee, Joint Budget Oversight Committee and the Joint Legislative Committee on Government Consolidation and Shared Services.

On June 12, 2011, Malone announced he would not seek reelection in the November 2011 elections after 18 years in the Assembly, but noted that "I want to stay involved in public service, and we'll see how that plays out in a couple years." He was succeeded by Sean T. Kean, who had previously served in the State Senate representing the 30th District prior to redistricting, and David Rible who had served from the 11th District (Bordentown had been moved into the 7th Legislative District after 2011). Following his retirement from the state legislature, Malone was elected to a single term as Mayor of Bordentown in 2013 before choosing to not seek another term in 2017.

New Jersey General Assembly
Preceded by Robert Singer	Member of the New Jersey General Assembly for the 30th District; October 14, 1993 – January 10, 2012; With: Melvin Cottrell, Ronald S. Dancer	Succeeded by Dave Rible; Sean T. Kean
