= Carmen A. Orechio =

American politician

Member of the New Jersey Senate
- In office January 8, 1974 – January 14, 1992
- Preceded by: District created
- Succeeded by: John E. Dimon
- Constituency: 27th district (1974–1982); 30th district (1982–1992)

107th President of the New Jersey Senate
- In office January 12, 1982 – January 14, 1986
- Preceded by: Joseph P. Merlino
- Succeeded by: John F. Russo

Personal details
- Born: November 4, 1926 Nutley, New Jersey, U.S.
- Died: February 26, 2018 (aged 91) Nutley, New Jersey, U.S.
- Party: Democratic
- Education: Rutgers University

Military service
- Branch/service: United States Army
- Battles/wars: World War II

Carmen Anthony Orechio (November 4, 1926 – February 26, 2018) was an American politician who served as President of the New Jersey Senate and as Commissioner and Mayor of Nutley, New Jersey.

== Early life and education ==
Orechio was born in 1926 in Nutley, New Jersey. He graduated from Nutley High School and Rutgers University. During World War II, he served in the United States Army with the European Occupational Forces.

== Career ==
Orechio was elected to the Nutley Board of Commissioners in 1968. During his tenure as commissioner he served as Director of the Department of Public Safety and as Director of the Department of Public Affairs. He served as Mayor of Nutley three times: 1972–1976, 1980–1984, and 1992–1996. He was the first Italian-American Mayor of Nutley, New Jersey.

He ran for the State Assembly in 1969, running in Essex County District 11C with fellow Democrat Joseph Iannuzzi. They were defeated by the Republican incumbents, C. Richard Fiore, and Ralph R. Caputo.

In 1973, Orechio was elected to the New Jersey Senate from Essex County. He defeated two-term incumbent Republican Michael Giuliano by 3,483 votes in the Democratic landslide of 1973, 29,878 (53%) to 26,395 (47%). He was re-elected to a second term in 1977 against Republican Assemblyman John N. Dennis by 918 votes, 25,773 (51%)to 24,855 (49.%). He was re-elected in 1981 by 1,060 votes against Republican John Crecco, a Bloomfield Councilman, 30,990 (49%) to 29,930 (48%). In 1983, he won his fourth term against Ralph J. Salerno, a Republican attorney from Bloomfield. Orechio received 28,613 (54%) to 23,523 (44%) for Salerno and 1,061 (2%) for Martin Scaturo, a former Democratic Essex County Freeholder who was running as an Independent. He was re-elected to a fifth term in the Senate in 1987, defeating Thomas Zampino (later a New Jersey Superior Court Judge), 20,949 (50%) to 18,455 (44%). John Kinder, who had served many years as the Republican Mayor of Bloomfield, received 2,371 (6%) of the vote as an Independent.

He served as Senate Majority Leader in 1981 and as Senate President from 1982 to 1985. In 1991, due to redistricting following the 1990 census, the 30th Legislative District represented by Orechio was moved to the south to form a new district. Rather than run in the 36th District against fellow Democratic incumbent Gabriel M. Ambrosio of Lyndhurst, Orechio announced that he would not seek re-election to the Senate.

In 2008, after 40 years of service on the Nutley Board of Commissioners, Orechio lost his 11th re-election bid by 29 votes.

== Death ==
Orechio died on February 26, 2018, in Nutley, New Jersey at the age of 91.

New Jersey Senate
Preceded by District created	Member of the New Jersey Senate from the 27th district 1974–1982	Succeeded by Richard Codey
Preceded by Frank E. Rodgers	Member of the New Jersey Senate from the 30th district 1982–1992	Succeeded by John E. Dimon
Political offices
Preceded by Harry W. Chenoweth	Mayor of Nutley, New Jersey; 1972–1976	Succeeded by Harry W. Chenoweth
Preceded by Harry W. Chenoweth	Mayor of Nutley, New Jersey; 1980–1984	Succeeded by Harry W. Chenoweth
Preceded by John V. Kelly	Mayor of Nutley, New Jersey; 1992–1996	Succeeded by Garry Furnari
Preceded by Joseph P. Merlino	President of the New Jersey Senate; 1982–1986	Succeeded by John F. Russo
