= John J. Spoltore =

American politician (1921–1973)

John Spoltore

Chair of the New Jersey Republican Party
- In office June 1973 – December 11, 1973
- Preceded by: John E. Dimon
- Succeeded by: Webster B. Todd

Mayor of Bridgeton, New Jersey
- In office 1953 – 1957

Personal details
- Born: January 21, 1921 Pennsylvania, U.S.
- Died: December 11, 1973 (aged 52) Trenton, New Jersey, U.S.
- Party: Republican

John J. Spoltore (January 21, 1921 – December 11, 1973) was an American Republican Party politician who served as chairman of the New Jersey Republican State Committee in 1973.

== Biography ==
He was born on January 21, 1921, in Pennsylvania. Before entering politics, Spoltore operated a dry-cleaning store in Bridgeton, New Jersey. He was Mayor of Bridgeton from 1953 to 1957. He served as chairman of the Bridgeton Republican Committee for fifteen years and the Cumberland County Republican Committee for six years.

After the U.S. Supreme Court, in Reynolds v. Sims (more commonly known as One Man, One Vote), required redistricting by state legislatures for congressional districts to keep represented populations equal, as well as requiring both houses of state legislatures to have districts drawn that contained roughly equal populations, and to perform redistricting when needed, Spoltore became a candidate for the New Jersey State Senate. He challenged three-term Democratic incumbent John A. Waddington. Because of its population, Salem and Cumberland counties were merged into one district with one Senator. Waddington won by 7,902 votes, 32,292 (56.92%)to 24,390 (42.99%). Spoltore lost in Salem County by a 2–1 margin, and lost Cumberland by a narrow 577 vote margin.

In June 1973, Spoltore replaced John E. Dimon as chairman of the New Jersey Republican State Committee. He was the selection of Charles W. Sandman, Jr., who was then the Republican candidate for Governor of New Jersey. Spoltore had served on Sandman's staff in the House of Representatives.

On December 11, 1973, Spoltore died of a heart attack at St. Francis Hospital in Trenton, New Jersey at the age of 52.

Party political offices
Preceded by John E. Dimon	Chairman of the New Jersey Republican State Committee; 1973	Succeeded by Webster B. Todd
