= John E. Dimon =

American politician (1916–1993)

Member of the New Jersey Senate from the 30th district
- In office January 14, 1992 – September 19, 1993
- Preceded by: Carmen Orechio (redistricting)
- Succeeded by: Robert W. Singer

Chair of the New Jersey Republican Party
- In office 1970–1973
- Preceded by: Nelson Gross
- Succeeded by: John J. Spoltore

Chair of the Burlington County Republican Party
- In office 1963–1970

Personal details
- Born: May 14, 1916 Roebling, New Jersey, U.S.
- Died: September 19, 1993 (aged 77)
- Party: Republican

John Edward Dimon (May 14, 1916 – September 19, 1993) was an American Republican Party politician who served in the New Jersey Senate and as chairman of the New Jersey Republican State Committee.

== Biography ==
Dimon was born in 1916 in the Roebling section of Florence Township, New Jersey. He enlisted in the United States Army in 1940 and served during the duration of American involvement in World War II. After the war, he worked as a lawyer, serving as Special Assistant Attorney General.

In 1963 he became chairman of the Burlington County Republican Committee. He was a contender to become chairman of the New Jersey Republican State Committee in 1969, but the post was won by Nelson G. Gross. After Gross resigned to run for the United States Senate in 1970, Dimon succeeded him, having been selected by Governor William T. Cahill.

After his term ended in 1973, Dimon continued to practice law in Mount Holly Township, New Jersey. In 1991 he was elected to the New Jersey Senate representing the 30th District, covering parts of Burlington, Ocean and Monmouth Counties. He was the New Jersey Legislature's oldest member. On September 19, 1993, he died after a brief illness at the age of 77. He was succeeded in the Senate by Robert W. Singer.

Party political offices
Preceded by Nelson G. Gross	Chairman of the New Jersey Republican State Committee; 1970–1973	Succeeded by John J. Spoltore
