= New Jersey's 30th legislative district =

American legislative district

- Senator: Robert Singer (R)
- Assembly members: Sean T. Kean (R); Avi Schnall (D)
- Registration: 37.6% Republican; 20.6% Democratic; 40.8% unaffiliated
- Demographics: 84.1% White; 2.5% Black/African American; 0.4% Native American; 1.6% Asian; 0.0% Hawaiian/Pacific Islander; 5.6% Other race; 5.9% Two or more races; 10.6% Hispanic
- Population: 269,949
- Voting-age population: 179,028
- Registered voters: 168,561

New Jersey's 30th legislative district is one of 40 districts that make up the map for the New Jersey Legislature. It covers the Monmouth County municipalities of Avon-by-the-Sea, Belmar, Farmingdale, Howell Township, Lake Como, and Wall Township and the Ocean County municipality of Lakewood Township.

== Demographic information ==
As of the 2020 United States census, the district had a population of 269,949, of whom 179,028 (66.3%) were of voting age. The racial makeup of the district was 226,943 (84.1%) White, 6,638 (2.5%) African American, 988 (0.4%) Native American, 4,395 (1.6%) Asian, 62 (0.0%) Pacific Islander, 15,059 (5.6%) from some other race, and 15,864 (5.9%) from two or more races. Hispanic or Latino of any race were 28,506 (10.6%) of the population.

The district had 168,561 registered voters as of December 1, 2021, of whom 68,776 (40.8%) were registered as unaffiliated, 63,444 (37.6%) were registered as Republicans, 34,659 (20.6%) were registered as Democrats, and 1,682 (1.0%) were registered to other parties.

== Political representation ==
For the 2026–2027 session, the 30th legislative district of the New Jersey Legislature is represented in the State Senate by Robert Singer (R, Lakewood Township) and in the General Assembly by Sean T. Kean (R, Wall Township) and Avi Schnall (D, Lakewood Township).

The legislative district is entirely within 4th congressional district.

== Apportionment history ==
When the 40-district legislative map was created in 1973, the 30th district was based in Essex and Hudson counties. It consisted of the Ironbound neighborhood and a part of the North Ward of Newark and Belleville in Essex County, and Harrison, East Newark, Kearny, and Secaucus in Hudson County. This district elected one of the few independents ever elected to the Legislature when in 1973, controversial Newark activist Anthony Imperiale won a term in the Senate in 1973, though he would later serve in the Assembly from the district as a Republican. In the 1980s, the 30th shifted slightly to the northwest when it encompassed Belleville, Bloomfield, Nutley, Glen Ridge, Montclair, Verona, and Cedar Grove, entirely in Essex County.

As the population began to shift away from the immediate suburbs of New Jersey cities in the 1980s, the 1991 Apportionment Commission using data collected from the 1990 census eliminated the 30th district as it existed in Essex County and shifted it to the fast-growing areas of Burlington, Monmouth, and Ocean counties. The new 30th district created in 1991 consisted of northern corner of Burlington County including Pemberton Borough and Township, Eastampton Township, Florence Township, Bordentown City and Township, the four panhandle municipalities of Monmouth County (Allentown, Upper Freehold Township, Roosevelt, and Millstone Township), and Ocean County's Plumsted, Jackson, and Lakewood townships. Though unaffiliated voters make up most of the district, they tended to vote for the Republican candidates in this area and no Democrat had been elected to the 30th since it was shifted to this area until 2023. In the 2001 redistricting, municipalities in the Burlington County portion of the district were removed leaving only the ones on the edge of the county from Bordentown Township and Fieldsboro to New Hanover; Millstone Township was also removed. Added in this redistricting were Washington Township in Mercer County (renamed Robbinsville Township in 2007) and Monmouth's Howell Township and Farmingdale. The 2011 redistricting compacted the district to Lakewood, Wall, and Howell townships, and other shoreline boroughs. As a result of the district shift, incumbent Assemblyman Joseph R. Malone announced his retirement and incumbent 11th district Senator Sean T. Kean dropped down to running for an Assembly seat to avoid a primary fight with Senator Robert Singer.

Assemblyman Dave Rible resigned his seat on July 17, 2017, to become Director of the New Jersey Division of Alcoholic Beverage Control. Former Wall Township Mayor Ned Thomson was selected by local Republican committee members as a replacement from a ballot of three candidates, and was sworn in on August 24. In 2023, Democrats won an Assembly seat for the first time since 1985 and marked the first time they held any seat from this district since it moved to Monmouth and Ocean counties in 1991.

== Election history ==
Session	Senate	General Assembly	
1974–1975	Anthony Imperiale (I)	Michael F. Adubato (D)	John F. Cali (D)
1976–1977	Anthony Imperiale (I)	Michael F. Adubato (D)	John F. Cali (D)
1978–1979	Frank E. Rodgers (D)	Michael F. Adubato (D)	John F. Cali (D)
1980–1981	Frank E. Rodgers (D)	Michael F. Adubato (D)	Anthony Imperiale (R)
1982–1983	Carmen A. Orechio (D)	Buddy Fortunato (D)	John V. Kelly (R)
1984–1985	Carmen A. Orechio (D)	Buddy Fortunato (D)	Steve Adubato Jr. (D)
1986–1987	Carmen A. Orechio (D)	Marion Crecco (R)	John V. Kelly (R)
1988–1989	Carmen A. Orechio (D)	Marion Crecco (R)	John V. Kelly (R)
1990–1991	Carmen A. Orechio (D)	Marion Crecco (R)	John V. Kelly (R)
1992–1993	John E. Dimon (R) (Note: Died September 19, 1993)	Robert Singer (R) (Note: Appointed to the Senate on October 13, 1993)	Melvin Cottrell (R)
1992–1993	Robert Singer (R)	Joseph R. Malone (R) (Note: Appointed to the Assembly on October 14, 1993)	Melvin Cottrell (R)
1994–1995	Robert Singer (R)	Joseph R. Malone (R)	Melvin Cottrell (R)
1996–1997	Robert Singer (R)	Joseph R. Malone (R)	Melvin Cottrell (R)
1998–1999	Robert Singer (R)	Joseph R. Malone (R)	Melvin Cottrell (R)
2000–2001	Robert Singer (R)	Joseph R. Malone (R)	Melvin Cottrell (R)
2002–2003	Robert Singer (R)	Joseph R. Malone (R)	Melvin Cottrell (R) (Note: Died October 10, 2002)
2002–2003	Robert Singer (R)	Joseph R. Malone (R)	Ronald S. Dancer (R) (Note: Appointed to the Assembly on November 18, 2002)
2004–2005	Robert Singer (R)	Joseph R. Malone (R)	Ronald S. Dancer (R)
2006–2007	Robert Singer (R)	Joseph R. Malone (R)	Ronald S. Dancer (R)
2008–2009	Robert Singer (R)	Joseph R. Malone (R)	Ronald S. Dancer (R)
2010–2011	Robert Singer (R)	Joseph R. Malone (R)	Ronald S. Dancer (R)
2012–2013	Robert Singer (R)	Sean T. Kean (R)	Dave Rible (R)
2014–2015	Robert Singer (R)	Sean T. Kean (R)	Dave Rible (R)
2016–2017	Robert Singer (R)	Sean T. Kean (R)	Dave Rible (R) (Note: Resigned July 17, 2017 to become Director of the Division of Alcoholic Beverage Control)
2016–2017	Robert Singer (R)	Sean T. Kean (R)	Ned Thomson (R) (Note: Appointed to the Assembly on August 24, 2017)
2018–2019	Robert Singer (R)	Sean T. Kean (R)	Ned Thomson (R)
2020–2021	Robert Singer (R)	Sean T. Kean (R)	Ned Thomson (R)
2022–2023	Robert Singer (R)	Sean T. Kean (R)	Ned Thomson (R)
2024–2025	Robert Singer (R)	Sean T. Kean (R)	Avi Schnall (D)
2026–2027	Robert Singer (R)	Sean T. Kean (R)	Avi Schnall (D)

== Election results ==
=== Senate ===
2021 New Jersey general election
Party	Candidate	Votes	%	±%
Republican	Robert W. Singer	53,130	71.2	▲11.0
Democratic	Dan Stinger	21,506	28.8	▼11.0
Total votes		74,636	100.0	

New Jersey general election, 2017
Party	Candidate	Votes	%	±%
Republican	Robert W. Singer	30,735	60.2	▼10.0
Democratic	Amy Sara Cores	20,343	39.8	▲10.0
Total votes		51,078	100.0	

New Jersey general election, 2013
Party	Candidate	Votes	%	±%
Republican	Robert W. Singer	36,563	70.2	▲4.3
Democratic	William H. Field	15,535	29.8	▼4.3
Total votes		52,098	100.0	

2011 New Jersey general election
Party	Candidate	Votes	%
Republican	Robert W. Singer	21,990	65.9
Democratic	Steve Morlino	11,376	34.1
Total votes		33,366	100.0

2007 New Jersey general election
Party	Candidate	Votes	%	±%
Republican	Robert W. Singer	23,072	61.6	▼1.0
Democratic	Steven Morlino	14,365	38.4	▲1.0
Total votes		37,437	100.0	

2003 New Jersey general election
Party	Candidate	Votes	%	±%
Republican	Robert W. Singer	24,637	62.6	▲0.9
Democratic	Steven Morlino	14,713	37.4	▼0.9
Total votes		39,350	100.0	

2001 New Jersey general election
Party	Candidate	Votes	%
Republican	Robert W. Singer	31,671	61.7
Democratic	Timothy J. Konopka	19,690	38.3
Total votes		51,361	100.0

1997 New Jersey general election
Party	Candidate	Votes	%	±%
Republican	Robert W. Singer	27,837	53.7	▼12.0
Democratic	Kenneth A. Kurtz	20,815	40.2	▲5.9
Libertarian	Bob Mondgock	1,932	3.7	N/A
Conservative	Fred Rasiewicz	1,208	2.3	N/A
Total votes		51,792	100.0	

1993 New Jersey general election
Party	Candidate	Votes	%	±%
Republican	Robert W. Singer	32,678	65.7	▲0.7
Democratic	Lyle M. (Peggi) Sturmfels	17,047	34.3	▼0.7
Total votes		49,725	100.0	

1991 New Jersey general election
Party	Candidate	Votes	%
Republican	John E. Dimon	26,651	65.0
Democratic	Neil J. O’Connell	14,345	35.0
Total votes		40,996	100.0

1987 New Jersey general election
Party	Candidate	Votes	%	±%
Democratic	Carmen A. Orechio	20,949	50.1	▼3.7
Republican	Thomas P. Zampino	18,455	44.2	0.0
Independent	John W. Kinder	2,371	5.7	N/A
Total votes		41,775	100.0	

1983 New Jersey general election
Party	Candidate	Votes	%	±%
Democratic	Carmen A. Orechio	28,613	53.8	▲4.4
Republican	Ralph J. Salerno	23,523	44.2	▼3.5
Regular Organization	Martin G. Scaturo	1,061	2.0	N/A
Total votes		53,197	100.0	

1981 New Jersey general election
Party	Candidate	Votes	%
Democratic	Carmen A. Orechio	30,990	49.4
Republican	John I. Crecco	29,930	47.7
Citizens	Arthur Kinoy	1,765	2.8
Total votes		62,685	100.0

1977 New Jersey general election
Party	Candidate	Votes	%	±%
Democratic	Francis E. Rodgers	20,081	48.0	▲11.6
Anti-Tax Candidate	Anthony Imperiale	14,771	35.3	▼14.0
Republican	Harry J. Romeo	6,946	16.6	▲2.4
Total votes		41,798	100.0	

1973 New Jersey general election
Party	Candidate	Votes	%
For the People	Anthony Imperiale	24,756	49.3
Democratic	Gregory J. Castano	18,286	36.4
Republican	C. Richard Fiore	7,131	14.2
Total votes		50,173	100.0

=== General Assembly ===
2021 New Jersey general election
Party	Candidate	Votes	%	±%
Republican	Sean T. Kean	54,541	36.8	▲0.5
Republican	Edward H. Thomson	52,678	35.5	▲1.7
Democratic	Stephen Dobbins	20,800	14.0	▼0.4
Democratic	Matthew Filosa	20,366	13.7	▼0.1
Total votes		148,385	100.0	

2019 New Jersey general election
Party	Candidate	Votes	%	±%
Republican	Sean T. Kean	25,426	36.3	▲3.0
Republican	Edward H. Thomson	23,662	33.8	▲3.5
Democratic	Steven Farkas	10,063	14.4	▼4.1
Democratic	Yasin “Jason” Celik	9,666	13.8	▼4.1
The Other Candidate	Hank Schroeder	1,213	1.7	N/A
Total votes		70,030	100.0	

New Jersey general election, 2017
Party	Candidate	Votes	%	±%
Republican	Sean T. Kean	33,672	33.3	▼1.2
Republican	Edward H. Thomson III	30,680	30.3	▼3.6
Democratic	Kevin Scott	18,737	18.5	▲2.6
Democratic	Eliot Arlo Colon	18,160	17.9	▲4.2
Total votes		101,249	100.0	

New Jersey general election, 2015
Party	Candidate	Votes	%	±%
Republican	Sean T. Kean	19,826	34.5	▼3.7
Republican	David P. Rible	19,459	33.9	▼2.0
Democratic	Jim Keady	9,148	15.9	▲2.5
Democratic	Lorna Phillipson	7,867	13.7	▲1.2
Economic Growth	Hank Schroeder	1,101	1.9	N/A
Total votes		57,401	100.0	

New Jersey general election, 2013
Party	Candidate	Votes	%	±%
Republican	Sean T. Kean	39,702	38.2	▲3.8
Republican	David P. Rible	37,252	35.9	▲4.7
Democratic	Jimmy Esposito	13,898	13.4	▼3.5
Democratic	Lorelei Rouvrais	12,967	12.5	▼3.5
Total votes		103,819	100.0	

New Jersey general election, 2011
Party	Candidate	Votes	%
Republican	Sean T. Kean	22,889	34.4
Republican	David P. Rible	20,728	31.2
Democratic	Shaun O'Rourke	11,256	16.9
Democratic	Howard Kleinhendler	10,639	16.0
Libertarian	David Schneck	986	1.5
Total votes		66,498	100.0

New Jersey general election, 2009
Party	Candidate	Votes	%	±%
Republican	Joseph R. Malone, III	47,325	36.6	▲5.0
Republican	Ronald S. Dancer	45,901	35.5	▲4.8
Democratic	John Kocubinski	18,400	14.2	▼4.8
Democratic	William "Bill" Spedding	17,836	13.8	▼4.9
Write-In	Personal choice	8	0.01	N/A
Total votes		129,470	100.0	

New Jersey general election, 2007
Party	Candidate	Votes	%	±%
Republican	Joseph R. Malone III	23,120	31.6	▼1.0
Republican	Ronald S. Dancer	22,477	30.7	▼1.4
Democratic	Sharon Atkinson	13,906	19.0	▲1.7
Democratic	Jeffrey Williamson	13,657	18.7	▲0.7
Total votes		73,160	100.0	

New Jersey general election, 2005
Party	Candidate	Votes	%	±%
Republican	Joseph R. Malone III	36,286	32.6	▼0.4
Republican	Ronald S. Dancer	35,794	32.1	▲0.6
Democratic	Jeffrey Williamson	20,053	18.0	▼0.6
Democratic	Marvin Krakower	19,235	17.3	▲0.4
Total votes		111,368	100.0	

New Jersey general election, 2003
Party	Candidate	Votes	%	±%
Republican	Joseph R. Malone	25,497	33.0	▲2.4
Republican	Ronald S. Dancer	24,355	31.5	▲1.9
Democratic	Joseph D. Grisanti	14,347	18.6	▼2.1
Democratic	Mitchel Dolobowsky	13,031	16.9	▼2.2
Total votes		77,230	100.0	

New Jersey general election, 2001
Party	Candidate	Votes	%
Republican	Joseph R. Malone III	30,903	30.6
Republican	Melvin Cottrell	29,963	29.6
Democratic	Michael L. Broderick	20,959	20.7
Democratic	Lyle M. (Peggi) Sturmfels	19,261	19.1
Total votes		101,086	100.0

New Jersey general election, 1999
Party	Candidate	Votes	%	±%
Republican	Joseph R. Malone	20,735	29.7	▲1.1
Republican	Melvin Cottrell	19,310	27.6	▼0.7
Democratic	Edward G. Werner	14,441	20.7	▲0.3
Democratic	Edward J. Choquette	13,429	19.2	▲0.5
Conservative	Kal Madgyesy	988	1.4	▼0.6
Conservative	Fred A. Rasiewicz	941	1.3	▼0.7
Total votes		69,844	100.0	

New Jersey general election, 1997
Party	Candidate	Votes	%	±%
Republican	Joseph R. Malone, III	28,550	28.6	▼5.0
Republican	Melvin Cottrell	28,236	28.3	▼3.5
Democratic	Arthur F. Conway	20,375	20.4	▲0.4
Democratic	Richard Borys	18,673	18.7	N/A
Conservative	Stephen Mognancki	2,028	2.0	▼4.7
Conservative	Sal Duscio	1,961	2.0	▼2.4
Total votes		99,823	100.0	

New Jersey general election, 1995
Party	Candidate	Votes	%	±%
Republican	Joseph R. Malone, III	19,068	33.6	▲2.8
Republican	Melvin Cottrell	18,061	31.8	▲1.7
Democratic	Lyle M. “Peggi” Sturmfels	11,387	20.0	▲0.3
Conservative	Cecilia A. Richel	3,823	6.7	N/A
Conservative	Joseph Stipick	2,528	4.4	N/A
U.S. Taxpayers	Angel A. Farley	1,963	3.5	N/A
Total votes		56,830	100.0	

New Jersey general election, 1993
Party	Candidate	Votes	%	±%
Republican	Joe Malone	30,457	30.8	▼3.8
Republican	Melvin Cottrell	29,809	30.1	▼3.0
Democratic	Michael Broderick	19,466	19.7	▲3.4
Democratic	Lou Gallagher	19,278	19.5	▲3.5
Total votes		99,010	100.0	

1991 New Jersey general election
Party	Candidate	Votes	%
Republican	Robert W. Singer	27,704	34.6
Republican	Melvin Cottrell	26,553	33.1
Democratic	Ralph Adinolfe	13,070	16.3
Democratic	Michael G. Tamn	12,804	16.0
Total votes		80,131	100.0

1989 New Jersey general election
Party	Candidate	Votes	%	±%
Republican	Marion Crecco	28,990	26.5	▼6.3
Republican	John V. Kelly	28,690	26.2	▼7.7
Democratic	Buddy Fortunato	28,050	25.6	▲8.4
Democratic	Ann C. Mega	23,787	21.7	▲5.5
Total votes		109,517	100.0	

1987 New Jersey general election
Party	Candidate	Votes	%	±%
Republican	John V. Kelly	26,681	33.9	▲5.6
Republican	Marion Crecco	25,827	32.8	▲6.8
Democratic	Cynthia A. DeBonis	13,537	17.2	▼6.2
Democratic	James A. Plaisted	12,768	16.2	▼6.1
Total votes		78,813	100.0	

1985 New Jersey general election
Party	Candidate	Votes	%	±%
Republican	John V. Kelly	30,820	28.3	▲3.1
Republican	Marion Crecco	28,268	26.0	▲8.4
Democratic	Stephen N. Adubato, Jr.	25,505	23.4	▼3.2
Democratic	Buddy Fortunato	24,290	22.3	▼6.0
Total votes		108,883	100.0	

New Jersey general election, 1983
Party	Candidate	Votes	%	±%
Democratic	A. J. Buddy Fortunato	29,408	28.3	▲1.9
Democratic	Stephen Adubato, Jr.	27,594	26.6	▲4.4
Republican	John V. Kelly	26,222	25.2	▼0.9
Republican	George Riepe	18,308	17.6	▼7.7
Regular Organization	Samuel J. Angelo	1,764	1.7	N/A
Beam the Bomb	Charles A. Grande	561	0.5	N/A
Total votes		103,857	100.0	

New Jersey general election, 1981
Party	Candidate	Votes	%
Democratic	A. J. “Buddy” Fortunato	31,902	26.4
Republican	John V. Kelly	31,591	26.1
Republican	Josephine M. Mongiello	30,624	25.3
Democratic	Mary V. Senatore	26,834	22.2
Total votes		120,951	100.0

New Jersey general election, 1979
Party	Candidate	Votes	%	±%
Republican	Anthony Imperiale	15,942	26.1	▲8.3
Democratic	Michael F. Adubato	15,312	25.1	▼1.3
Democratic	John F. Cali	14,972	24.5	▼1.2
Republican	Michael R. Bucco	12,233	20.0	▲3.5
Independent	Michael Giordano	2,593	4.2	N/A
Total votes		61,052	100.0	

New Jersey general election, 1977
Party	Candidate	Votes	%	±%
Democratic	Michael F. Adubato	19,678	26.4	▼1.7
Democratic	John F. Cali	19,141	25.7	▼1.2
Republican	Daniel R. Russo	13,283	17.8	▼4.6
Republican	George R. Riepe, Jr.	12,265	16.5	▼4.4
Independent Anti-Tax	Anthony Esposito	5,541	7.4	N/A
Independent	Theodore R. Murnick	4,643	6.2	N/A
Total votes		74,551	100.0	

New Jersey general election, 1975
Party	Candidate	Votes	%	±%
Democratic	Michael F. Adubato	21,109	28.1	▼5.3
Democratic	John F. Cali	20,143	26.9	▼5.8
Republican	Daniel R. Russo	16,816	22.4	▲6.3
Republican	Frederick R. Dunne, Jr.	15,661	20.9	▲7.4
U.S. Labor	Stuart Michael Bronn	1,269	1.7	N/A
Total votes		74,998	100.0	

New Jersey general election, 1973
Party	Candidate	Votes	%
Democratic	Michael F. Adubato	27,652	33.4
Democratic	John F. Cali	27,094	32.7
Republican	Joseph F. McGreevy	13,325	16.1
Republican	Rowland D. Johnston	11,160	13.5
American	Raymond C. Parker	1,015	1.2
Independent	Werner B. Knaak	1,014	1.2
American	Thomas Caslander	996	1.2
Independent	Theodore R. Murnick	571	0.7
Total votes		82,827	100.0
