= Peter C. Eagler =

American politician (1954–2024)

Member of the New Jersey General Assembly from the 34th district
- In office January 9, 2002 – January 10, 2006 Serving with Willis Edwards (2002-2004); Sheila Oliver (2004-2006)
- Preceded by: Marion Crecco; Gerald H. Zecker
- Succeeded by: Thomas P. Giblin

Personal details
- Born: November 23, 1954 Clifton, New Jersey, U.S.
- Died: May 11, 2024 (aged 69) Hackensack, New Jersey, U.S.
- Party: Democratic
- Education: Fairleigh Dickinson University

Peter C. Eagler (November 23, 1954 – May 11, 2024) was an American Democratic Party politician from New Jersey, who represented the 34th legislative district in the New Jersey General Assembly from 2002 to 2006. He served as a city councilman in Clifton, New Jersey, from 1990 to 2002, and again from 2006 to 2022.

Eagler served on the Assembly's Regulated Professions and Independent Authorities (as Chair), Telecommunications and Utilities (as Vice Chair) and Senior Issues Committees. He also served as a member of the Passaic County Board of Chosen Freeholders from 1996 until 2005.

== Biography ==
Born in Clifton, New Jersey, Eagler was raised in both Clifton and Garfield, and attended Paul VI High School in Clifton. Eagler graduated with a B.A. in 1976 from Fairleigh Dickinson University in Political Science and Russian Area Studies. In 1977 he began working as the Safety Inspector for the New Jersey Highway Authority, serving in that capacity for ten years until he was selected to head the directorship of the Heritage Festivals at the Garden State Arts Center. When the Arts Center was privatized, Eagler was assigned to the computer area of the Highway Authority.

In 1990, Eagler campaigned for, and won, a seat on Clifton's City Council. He was subsequently reelected in 1994 and 1998. While serving on the council, Eagler became a rising star in the county Democratic Party, and in 1995, was nominated with Harry Lashley to run against incumbent Republican Freeholders Walter Porter and Jack O'Brien, whom they were unsuccessful in unseating. However, in 1996, Eagler and Georgia Scott succeeded in their efforts, unseating incumbent Charles Delahanty, and picking up an open seat left when Richard DuHaime decided to run for the United States Senate. A year later, the Democrats gained a 4-3 majority on the board after picking up two formerly Republican seats, and Eagler became the Freeholder Director for one year. He was reelected in 1999 alongside Elease Evans.

In 2001, Eagler decided to run for state assembly as a Democrat alongside Willis Edwards. Thanks to redistricting from the 2000 census, Clifton, which had for years been linked with several Republican-leaning towns and cities, was paired with many Democratic strongholds in Essex County. Due in large part to that, Eagler, Edwards, and State Senator Nia Gill swept the incumbent Republicans out of office. This enabled Eagler, with his seat on the Clifton council and Passaic County Freeholder Board, to hold three offices simultaneously. Due to New Jersey's ban on multiple officeholding, he is the last person to have held three elected offices simultaneously. He did not, however, stand for reelection to the Clifton city council in May of that year, but was reelected in November to a third term as Freeholder.

Eagler stood for re-election with East Orange's Sheila Oliver replacing Edwards on the ticket in 2003. Despite a divided ticket, where Eagler and Oliver ran under separate Senate candidates, Eagler and Oliver were reelected along with Gill, for a second term. He did not run for re-election in 2005, though it was not certain whether Eagler decided not to run on his own, or if he had been bumped from the ticket in favor of current Assemblyman Thomas P. Giblin, and combined with his decision not to run for a fourth term as Freeholder Eagler left public office altogether.

After taking some time off, Eagler decided to attempt to regain a seat on the Clifton City Council. In May 2006, he was returned to the council, along with three other candidates who ousted four incumbents (including three who had served multiple terms). He later stood for re-election in 2010, 2014, and 2018.

In September 2022, Eagler announced his retirement from the Council after his six different full terms there, along with his terms in the General Assembly; that announcement came alongside Mayor James Anzaldi also announcing his retirement from the Council, after his nine consecutive terms as Mayor (1990-2022), with reported "infighting" among members of the Council over the direction of the City of Clifton in the early 2020s being their main reasons for suddenly wanting to retire from the Council.

Eagler died on May 11, 2024, at the age of 69.
