= John F. Cali =

American politician

Member of the New Jersey General Assembly from the 30th district
- In office January 8, 1974 – January 8, 1980
- Preceded by: District created
- Succeeded by: Anthony Imperiale

Personal details
- Born: May 9, 1928 Newark, New Jersey
- Died: January 15, 1992 (aged 63)
- Party: Democratic

John F. Cali (May 9, 1928 – January 15, 1992) was an American Democratic Party politician who served three terms in the New Jersey General Assembly, representing the 30th Legislative District from 1974 to 1980.

== Biography ==
Cali was born in Newark, New Jersey, on May 9, 1928, and graduated from Kearny High School. He then attended the Casey Jones School of Aeronautics (now Vaughn College of Aeronautics and Technology) before joining the United States Army and fighting during the Korean War from 1950 to 1952. After returning to New Jersey, he worked as an administrative assistant at the Hudson County Jail and was the secretary to the warden at the time of his service in the Assembly.

In 1973, he ran for the General Assembly from the new 30th district encompassing western Hudson County plus Belleville and the Ironbound and North Ward neighborhoods of Newark. He and running mate Michael F. Adubato received the most votes in the June primary narrowly defeating incumbent Assemblyman Frank Megaro and Fiorentino J. Alati by running larger margins in the Hudson portion of the district. The two Democratic primary winners were ultimately successful in the general election that year and were also reelected in 1975 and 1977. However, in 1979, Cali was defeated for a fourth term by Newark activist and former independent state legislator Anthony Imperiale running as a Republican; Adubato was reelected by coming in second place.

Cali later became the warden at the Hudson County Jail in the 1980s. He died on January 15, 1992, at the age of 63.
