= Marion Crecco =

American politician (1930–2015)

Member of the New Jersey General Assembly from the 34th District
- In office January 14, 1992 – January 8, 2002 Serving with Gerald H. Zecker
- Preceded by: Joseph A. Mecca
- Succeeded by: Peter C. Eagler; Willis Edwards

Member of the New Jersey General Assembly from the 30th District
- In office January 13, 1986 – January 14, 1992 Serving with John V. Kelly
- Preceded by: Steve Adubato; Buddy Fortunato
- Succeeded by: Robert Singer; Melvin Cottrell

Personal details
- Born: January 25, 1930
- Died: November 28, 2015 (aged 85)
- Party: Republican
- Spouse: John I. Crecco
- Children: two
- Education: Seton Hall University; Montclair State College

Marion Crecco (January 25, 1930 – November 28, 2015) was an American Republican Party politician, who served in the New Jersey General Assembly from 1986 to 2002, where she represented the 30th Legislative District (1986–1992) and then the 34th Legislative District (1992–2002) following redistricting in the wake of the 1990 United States census.

== Biography ==
Crecco was born on January 25, 1930, to Joan and Jasper LaBruzzo of Newark. She attended Newark Arts High School, Art Students League of New York, Seton Hall University majoring in Marketing and Montclair State College where she majored in Liberal Arts. She worked professionally as president and accounting executive of Marion Crecco Associates, an advertising agency in her residence of Bloomfield. At the agency, she became the first woman to represent the Thomas Publishing Company as an agent and later as sales manager. Crecco was married to John Crecco, a chemist who also served as a Bloomfield councilman and mayor.

Crecco had two daughters in addition to four grandchildren. Later in life, she and John moved to Verona. Crecco died on November 28, 2015.

== Political career ==
Crecco was a long-time chair of the Bloomfield Republican Party Committee. She served as an alternate delegate to the Republican National Conventions in 1984, and as a delegate to the 1988 and 1996 Republican National Conventions.

Crecco was first elected to the General Assembly from the 30th District with running mate John V. Kelly in the Kean landslide election of 1985 defeating both Democratic Party incumbents Steve Adubato and Buddy Fortunato. She and Kelly were easily re-elected in 1987 and 1989 in the district consisting of northern Essex County municipalities. After redistricting following the 1990 Census, Crecco won five elections in the 34th Legislative District in 1991, 1993, 1995, 1997 and 1999, serving together with Republican Gerald H. Zecker for all five terms in the Essex and Passaic county-based district.

While in the Assembly, Crecco served in the Republican leadership as Assistant Republican Whip from 1986 to 1989 and Assistant Majority Leader from 1992 to 1995. She was chair of the Law and Public Safety Committee and the Task Force on Catastrophic and Long-Term Health Care Committee while the Republicans held the chamber in the 1990s. She was also a co-chair of the Republican Task Force on Government Accountability and Efficiency, State Government and Independent Authorities Committees, the Advisory Council on Women and Children, and the Safe and Secure Communities Selection Panel. In addition, she served on the Assembly Budget, Consumer Affairs, and Transportation Committees and was the New Jersey State Director of the National Order of Women Legislators.

In 1988, Crecco proposed legislation in the Assembly to require schools to teach abstinence as the only reliable means of preventing the spread of AIDS, stating that without this approach "we are allowing our children to play Russian roulette". Building on an experience in which she was unable to connect with her niece following her sister's death, Crecco introduced legislation in September 1996 that would grant aunts and uncles visitation rights, in addition to the grandparents and siblings already covered for unsupervised visitations under previous law passed in 1993.

Following the 2001 apportionment which moved her residence of Bloomfield to the western Newark-centered 28th Legislative District, she ran for the New Jersey Senate in 2001 against incumbent Democrat Ronald Rice. A lawsuit filed by then-34th District Senator Norman M. Robertson alleged that the commission charged with drawing the Legislative districts worked to protect incumbent racial minority members of the New Jersey Legislature; the suit, in part, cited Crecco's hometown shift to the 28th District whose Senate seat was held by Rice, an African American. Ultimately, Crecco lost to Rice by a 69.4%-29.6% margin with an independent candidate taking 1.0% of the vote. Following her loss, she became the chair of the John I. Crecco Foundation, a non-profit organization named for her husband, which raises money for various local hospitals.

New Jersey General Assembly
Preceded by Steve Adubato; Buddy Fortunato	Member of the New Jersey General Assembly for the 30th District; January 13, 1986 – January 14, 1992; With: John V. Kelly	Succeeded by Robert Singer; Melvin Cottrell
Preceded by Joseph A. Mecca	Member of the New Jersey General Assembly for the 34th District; January 14, 1992 – January 8, 2002; With: Gerald H. Zecker	Succeeded by Peter C. Eagler; Willis Edwards
