= John V. Kelly =

American politician (1926–2009)

John Vincent Kelly Sr. (July 11, 1926 – October 30, 2009) was an American Republican Party politician who served as Mayor of Nutley, New Jersey, and served nine terms in the New Jersey General Assembly, before losing two electoral bids to win a seat in the New Jersey Senate.

== Early life and education ==
Kelly was born in Jersey City, New Jersey on July 11, 1926 of Irish and Italian descent. He attended St. Nicholas Grammar School and St. Peter's Preparatory School. He served in the United States Army during World War II as a demolitions expert in the Philippines. After completing his military service, he earned a degree in accounting and finance from Saint Peter's College (now Saint Peter's University) in 1951. While in college during the day, he worked at night at the Erie Railroad docks and for the Railway Express Agency.

He worked as an accountant for the firm of Peat, Marwick, and Mitchell (now part of KPMG), where one of his responsibilities was auditing Nutley Savings and Loan. He was hired in 1962, became comptroller and a board member the following year and executive vice president in 1971. He was named president and chairman after the death of John Dolan. Under his leadership, the savings and loan was ranked 13th among the 200 S&Ls statewide, with 22,000 customers and $212 million in assets, grown from the $60 million at the start if his tenure.

== Political career ==
He first won a seat in the New Jersey General Assembly in 1981 against Democrat Mary V. Senatore. He was unseated two years later by 26-year-old Democratic Party candidate Steve Adubato, though Kelly would take the seat back in 1985. In the Assembly, Kelly sponsored legislation in 1991 that established the first law in the state requiring children under 14 to wear a helmet while riding a bicycle, scooter or skateboard. In 1997, he sponsored legislation to set standards to license hospice programs. Other legislation among the 143 bills he authored that were signed into law include a bill requiring that all state insurance companies provide coverage for mammograms and pap smears. In May 1988, Kelly was elected mayor of Nutley, with the 6,179 cast for him being the most ever received by a commission candidate in that community.

Choosing to run for the New Jersey Senate in 2001, he left the Assembly to challenge incumbent Democrat Garry Furnari, losing a close race in a district that encompassed significant portions of Southern Bergen County, New Jersey. That year, he lost by a 52–48% margin. The seat was considered one of the few statewide that could have been a pickup for the Democrats.

In 2003, he challenged Furnari's successor Paul Sarlo of Wood-Ridge, who was elected to replace him in the Assembly in 2001 and who also outspent Kelly by a nearly three-to-one margin in a pivotal race at a time when the Senate was evenly split between the two major parties and a change in party for any one seat could tip control of the upper house. Democrats won full control of the Senate, and Kelly fell short, by a margin of 53–44%.

A longtime fixture at Nutley's St. Patrick's Day festivities, Kelly would wear a bright green suit that had been custom-made for him. He also played a pivotal role in creating that community's Columbus Day parade.

As president of Nutley Savings Bank, Kelly was known for going out of his way to find a justification to fund a mortgage for a prospective customer and was likened to Jimmy Stewart's character George Bailey in the holiday classic It's a Wonderful Life.

== Death ==
Kelly died at age 83 on October 30, 2009, in what was described as "a most peaceful manner" at Clara Maass Medical Center in Belleville, New Jersey He was survived by his wife, Elizabeth, as well as by two daughters, two sons and 11 grandchildren.

New Jersey General Assembly
Preceded by Anthony Imperiale; Michael F. Adubato	Member of the New Jersey General Assembly from the 30th district 1982–1984; Served alongside: Buddy Fortunato	Succeeded by Steve Adubato Jr.
Preceded by Buddy Fortunato; Steve Adubato Jr.	Member of the New Jersey General Assembly from the 30th district 1986–1992; Served alongside: Marion Crecco	Succeeded by Robert Singer; Melvin Cottrell
Preceded by Louis J. Gill; Thomas J. Duch	Member of the New Jersey General Assembly from the 36th district 1992–2002; Served alongside: Paul DiGaetano	Succeeded by Paul Sarlo
Political offices
Preceded by Harry W. Chenoweth	Mayor of Nutley, New Jersey; 1988–1992	Succeeded by Carmen A. Orechio
