= Melvin Cottrell =

American politician

Member of the New Jersey General Assembly from the 30th district
- In office January 14, 1992 – October 9, 2002
- Preceded by: Marion Crecco; John V. Kelly
- Succeeded by: Ronald S. Dancer

Personal details
- Born: March 31, 1929 Jackson Township, New Jersey
- Died: October 9, 2002 (aged 73) Philadelphia, Pennsylvania
- Party: Republican

Melvin Cottrell (March 31, 1929 – October 9, 2002) was an American Republican Party politician who served in the New Jersey General Assembly from 1992 until his death in 2002. He represented the 30th Legislative District, which included portions of Burlington, Monmouth, Mercer and Ocean counties.

Cottrell lived his entire life in Jackson Township, attending the local public schools and graduating from Lakewood High School. Cottrell was employed as the Assistant Superintendent of Public Property of Ocean County. He served as Chair of the Jackson Township Board of Health from 1980 to 1985, was elected and served on its Township Committee from 1986 to 1991 and was Jackson Township's mayor in 1988 and 1989.

In the Assembly, Cottrell served as the Chair of the Senior Issues and Community Services Committee and was a member of the Solid and Hazardous Waste Committee. Cottrell was an advocate for senior citizens and the disabled, and proposed legislation to require hearing aid coverage by health insurance companies. Together with Joseph J. Roberts and Robert Singer, Cottrell sponsored legislation that would allow sports betting in Atlantic City casinos on professional and college sports, but would exclude wagering on games played by New Jersey colleges.

Cottrell died on October 9, 2002, at Graduate University Hospital in Philadelphia. In November 2002, Republican County Committee representatives from the 30th District chose Ronald S. Dancer, mayor of Plumsted Township to fill the vacancy created by Cottrell's death; Dancer defeated Howell Township Councilmember Joseph DiBella by a 106–72 margin in voting by county committee heads.
