= New Jersey Conservative Party =

- Chairman: Dr. Steven Maness
- Founded: 1992
- Ideology: American exceptionalism States' rights Paleolibertarianism
- Political position: Center-right to right-wing

Website
- http://www.conservativepartynj.org/

The New Jersey Conservative Party, formerly abbreviated as the NJCP, now as CP-NJ, is a conservative political party in New Jersey, United States.

== Ideology ==
According to their website, the Conservative Party outlines its nine principles as follows:

- Reduction of the state government to the absolute minimum to allow local municipal and county governments greater control over New Jersyites political lives.
- The belief in American Exceptionalism, that "America is a country of a distinguished founding, historical experiences and a unique path to the future."
- Limiting the ability for new legislation to be passed, arguing that "government cannot legislate a perfect life for its citizens."
- Preserving the past through advocating for only laws that lead "to a better civil and social existence."
- Rejecting the Government's ability to "do" things, stating that governmental actions should be limited to ensuring "fair and just competition."
- Slashing the federal government and any policies towards taxpayer subsidized education, economics, food and housing.
- Reducing taxation to a minimum, arguing that taxation is "extortion" and a "means to create divisions."
- Rejecting avarice and consumerism, arguing that resources should be "shared in a voluntary manner."
- Rejecting wealth redistribution arguing that those who support redistribution "believe our natural resources are purely for present consumption."

== Membership ==
According to the New Jersey Division of Elections (part of the New Jersey Department of State), there were 154 registered Conservative Party members statewide on October 20, 2008. Membership in the party grew five-fold in 2015-2016; as of March 2016, there were 814 registered members, and by November 2016, there were 3,516. Membership grew again in 2018; in February there were 7,371 registered voters, and as of July 2018, there were 8,447.

In February 2019, there were 10,610 registered members.

On the voting day for the 2025 New Jersey gubernatorial election primary the Conservative Party had 11,448 registered members.

== History ==
=== 1963 New Jersey elections ===
In the 1963 election for New Jersey Assembly a number of candidates ran as "Conservative" in Essex and Bergen counties as part of a nationwide split in the Republican party which saw northeastern states, like New Jersey, have their state Republican party be dominated by the party's liberal faction. These Conservative candidates opposed the social liberal policies of the Dwight D. Eisenhower administration in favor of the more social conservative school of thought emerging with Senator Barry Goldwater. This party split would end following the 1964 United States presidential election and its 1964 Republican National Convention which effectively saw the Goldwater wing of the party dominate. These candidates have no relation to the party founded in 1992, but were listed under the same name on the ballot.

=== 1992 party ===
The New Jersey Conservative Party was created in 1992 by Tom Blomquist, who had run as candidate for Governor of New Jersey in the 1989 as a Republican getting 0.98% of the vote in the primary, and in 1993 gubernatorial elections as a Conservative getting 0.21% of the vote.

The party's initial platform was a rejection of bossism and promotion of the use of referendum for passing legislature. The party also sought the abolition of county governments as a way to cut taxes throughout the state. They also led a series of ballot questions which would dissolve wards in many New Jersey towns and cities, replacing them with at-large districts. The party's initial stronghold was Blomquist's hometown of Brick, but made its initial headquarters in Point Pleasant Beach. During the party's foundation Blomquist met with Michael R. Long, then chairman of the Conservative Party of New York State, who gave him his blessing to make a New Jersey Conservative Party, although besides this the two parties had no formal affiliation to each other.

The NJCP received the endorsement of United We Stand America, H. Ross Perot's citizen action organization in 1995. In 1995, the party ran approximately 60 candidates for the New Jersey General Assembly, none of whom won. the party broke the record for the most third party candidates during one election in the history of New Jersey. This helped lead the NJCP to receiving 117,219 votes. However, in order to earn official third-party status from the state, the party was required to bring in at least 10% of the total vote; a number it did not meet. The party considered changing its name in support of Perot's presidential candidacy.

In 1997, the Conservative Party and other members of the Council of Alternative Political Parties filed suit against the state regarding filing deadlines and the number of signatures needed to do so.

The party ran candidates in every district in New Jersey in the midterm 1998 United States House of Representatives elections.

In 1999, New Jersey Conservative Party and three of its individual members who were candidates for elective office filed a certified complaint to enjoin county clerks, from drawing separate political party columns for the Democratic and Republican parties on the official ballot. The party also brought an appeal to the Supreme Court of New Jersey regarding preferential ballot positions for the Republican and Democratic parties compared to the NJCP. Historically, the Republican and Democratic candidates were given top spots on the ballot, and the NJCP argued that low voter turn-out led to these parties not even receiving the 10% vote minimum (out of all registered voters for that cycle) to proceed to the general vote. However, the court ruled to reject the application.

In 2000, the New Jersey Conservative Party was involved in a lawsuit that permitted New Jersey voters to join third parties. Until 2001 New Jersey did not allow registering to vote as anything other than Democrat, Republican, or Independent. This was ruled unconstitutional in 2001 after a lawsuit was brought by a coalition of political parties, including the NJCP.

In 2009 the State Chairman Stephen Spinosa asked registered members to change their party affiliation to Republican so they could vote for Steve Lonegan for Governor. (Spinosa had run for office as NJCP candidate, twice for State and once for Congress between 1997 and 1999). By doing so he effectively called for the suspension, though not dissolution, of his third-party movement in order to boost Lonegan's chances.

On February 19, 2010, the New Jersey Conservative Party signed an affiliation agreement with the national Conservative Party USA. By February 20, the New Jersey affiliate turned over their party membership to the national party for management in accordance with the affiliation agreement. Dr. Steven Maness (who had run as Conservative Party candidate for Middlesex County Freeholder in 1998) assumed New Jersey party leadership on December 30.

After the election of Donald Trump during the 2016 United States presidential election, third parties across New Jersey saw a spike in registration. In 2018 the Conservative Party was the fourth largest party in the state, Behind the Democrats, Republicans and Libertarians respectively with 8,447 registered voters, slightly above the Constitution Party's 8,288. In 2016, prior to the election, the Conservative party had just 3,509 registered voters.

In January 2019, Martin Marks, former mayor of Scotch Plains, alongside Harris Pappas, announced their independent candidacy for the New Jersey's 21st Legislative District, under the banner of "Conservative" in the 2019 New Jersey elections. Both would go on to lose handily with 1.05% and 0.99% respectively.

== See also ==
- Conservatism in the United States
- Conservative Party of New York
- Political party strength in New Jersey
