= Louis J. Gill =

American politician (1940–2020)

Louis John Gill

Member of the New Jersey General Assembly from the 36th district
- In office January 12, 1988 – January 7, 1992
- Preceded by: Paul DiGaetano; Kathleen Donovan
- Succeeded by: Paul DiGaetano; John V. Kelly

Personal details
- Born: January 19, 1940 Passaic, New Jersey, U.S.
- Died: April 2, 2020 (aged 80)
- Party: Democratic
- Spouse: Mary Hutchison (m. 1963)
- Children: 4
- Education: Fairleigh Dickinson University; Montclair State College; William Paterson College; Jersey City State College
- Occupation: Special education teacher

Louis John Gill (January 19, 1940 – April 2, 2020) was an American Democratic Party politician who served on the Passaic, New Jersey city council and in the New Jersey General Assembly.

== Early life and education ==
Gill was born in Passaic, New Jersey in 1940. He attended Passaic High School and then attended Fairleigh Dickinson College where he graduated with a degree in accounting in 1961. He then continued his education at Montclair State College, William Paterson College, and Jersey City State College where he earned a master's degree in urban education.

== Career ==
Gill worked as a special education teacher in the Paterson school district.

Gill was appointed to the Passaic Alcoholic Beverage Commission in 1968 and eventually served as chairman. In 1977, he was elected to the Passaic city council eventually becoming president of the council. In 1987, with Democratic running mate Garfield mayor Thomas J. Duch, Gill defeated Republican candidates Frank B. Calandriello and Andrew E. Bertone for two seats in the New Jersey General Assembly from the 36th district after the two incumbent Republicans chose not to run for reelection. The two were reelected in 1989. In 1990, Gill cast one of the final votes in favor of Governor James Florio's unpopular income tax increases. As a result of this and redistricting that removed more Democratic towns like Garfield and Ridgefield and added more Republican towns like Nutley and Belleville, Gill and running mate Alfred R. Restaino were defeated by incumbent Republican Assemblyman John V. Kelly and former Republican Assemblyman Paul DiGaetano.

During his time in the Assembly, Gill continued to be re-elected to his Passaic city council seat. Following his defeat from the Assembly, he continued to serve on the Passaic council until he lost his seat there in 1995.

== Personal life ==
In 1963, Gill married the former Mary Hutchison and had four children together. He died on April 2, 2020.
