= List of mayors of Passaic, New Jersey =

Mayors of Passaic, New Jersey

Most recent first:

- Hector Carlos Lora, 2016 to present (interim mayor, November 17, 2016; elected to regular term May 9, 2017)
- Alex Blanco, November 2008 to the day he pleaded guilty and was convicted on federal bribery charges (November 17, 2016)
- Gary Schaer (acting mayor, unelected), May 2008 to November 2008
- Samuel Rivera (1946–2020), July 1, 2001 to the day he pleaded guilty and was convicted on federal bribery charges (May 9, 2008)
- Marge Semler (1923–2015), May 12, 1993 to June 30, 2001
- Joseph Lipari, 1983 to 1993 (federal tax and conspiracy conviction)
- Robert C. Hare (1914–2010), 1978 to 1983
- Gerald Goldman, 1971 to 1978
- Bernard E. Pinck (1917–1981), 1967 to 1971
- Paul G. DeMuro: 1960 to 1967; note: 2nd of 2 periods in office (see below, 1948)
- Gap between 1955 and 1960
- Morris Pashman (1912–1999), 1951 to 1955
- Paul G. DeMuro, 1948 to 1951; note: 1st of 2 periods in office (see above, 1960 )
- Nicholas Martini (1904–1991), 1943 to 1947
- Gap between 1930 and 1943
- Benjamin Franklin Turner, Sr., c. 1930
- Gap between 1919 and 1930
- George Nicholas Seger (1866–1940), September 26, 1911 (at noon) to 1919
- Bird W. Spencer, 1910 to 1911, when form of government changed; note: 2nd of 2 periods in office (see below, 1879)
- Frederick Low, 1908 to 1909
- David Greenlie, 1904 to 1907
- Gap between 1899 and 1904
- Charles Moffat Howe (1851–1920), c. 1887 (conflicting information with McLean)
- Andrew McLean, 1887 to November 1899 (conflicting information with Howe)
- John Willet, April 1885 to 1887
- Bird W. Spencer, 1879 to April, 1885; note: 1st of 2 periods in office (see above, 1910)
- Gap before 1879
