= Alex Blanco =

American politician (born 1972)

Mayor of Passaic, New Jersey
- In office November 2008 – November 2016
- Preceded by: Gary Schaer (as Acting Mayor)
- Succeeded by: Hector Lora

Member of the Passaic School Board

Personal details
- Born: 1972 (age 53–54) Dominican Republic
- Party: Democratic Party
- Spouse: Aurora Blanco
- Education: Kean University; New York College of Podiatric Medicine
- Profession: Mayor, Passaic, New Jersey

Alex Blanco (born 1972) is an American politician, who served as mayor of Passaic, New Jersey. A member of the Democratic Party, Blanco was the first elected and second serving Dominican-American mayor in the United States.

== Biography ==
Alex Blanco was born in the Dominican Republic in 1972. In 1984, when Alex was 12 years old, he emigrated from La Vega Province to Passaic, New Jersey, with his mother, stepfather, and two siblings. Two of his siblings have recently moved with him as well. Blanco's family struggled financially and received foodstamps for a time during Alex's childhood. He was paid by the Passaic School Board for taking the SAT's. Blanco graduated from Kean University and New York College of Podiatric Medicine.

Blanco was first elected in November 2008 in a special election to complete the unexpired term of former Mayor Samuel Rivera, who resigned after pleading guilty to attempted extortion. He received around twenty eight percent of the 13,769 votes.

In April 2009, Blanco announced he was running for a full-term, and was endorsed by Senator Bob Menendez. He won a full four-year term in the May election, defeating city supervisor Vincent Capuana. Blanco was sworn on July 1, 2009, when he began serving his four-year term.

Blanco was described as the "classic American success story" by Gary Schaer, whom Blanco replaced as acting mayor in the 2008 special election.

== Bribery case and resignation ==
In November 2016, Blanco pled guilty to a single federal count of bribery, agreeing to resign immediately. Blanco admitted in court to accepting $110,000 in bribes from two unnamed housing developers in exchange for directing more than $200,000 in HUD funds to a failed low-income housing development. He faced up to 10 years in federal prison upon sentencing, scheduled for February 2017. He was succeeded by Passaic County Freeholder Hector Lora, in an appointment made by the City Council.

Blanco is the second consecutive elected mayor of Passaic, and the third in two decades (following Joseph Lipari and Sammy Rivera), to be convicted of or plead guilty to official misconduct charges.

Political offices
| Preceded by Gary Schaer | Mayor of Passaic, New Jersey; 2009–2016 | Incumbent |
