= John P. Scott =

American politician (1933–2010)

Member of the New Jersey Senate from the 36th district
- In office January 14, 1992 – January 13, 1998
- Preceded by: Gabriel M. Ambrosio
- Succeeded by: Garry Furnari

Personal details
- Born: June 12, 1933 Wilkes-Barre, Pennsylvania, U.S.
- Died: May 21, 2010 (aged 76)
- Party: Republican
- Education: Montclair State University

John P. Scott (June 12, 1933 – May 21, 2010) was an American Republican Party politician who served in the New Jersey Senate from 1992 to 1998 where he represented the 36th Legislative District, which covered Passaic and portions of southern Bergen County.

Scott was born in Wilkes-Barre, Pennsylvania on June 12, 1933. He grew up in Jersey City and graduated from William L. Dickinson High School in June 1951. He graduated from Montclair State University before serving in the United States Army. During the 1980s, Scott served as chairman of the New Jersey Conservative Caucus. Scott was campaign manager for Arthur F. Jones in his 1986 bid to unseat Congressman Robert Torricelli.

A resident of Lyndhurst, Scott was elected to the State Senate in 1991, when he defeated incumbent Gabriel Ambrosio in the wake of widespread voter dissatisfaction with then-Governor of New Jersey James Florio. The feared loss of state aid to local communities under the 1990 Quality Education Act also played a role in Scott's win. The two faced off again in 1993, with Scott winning re-election by a 53-47% margin. While serving in the Senate, Scott pushed for the elimination of wasteful spending and was an advocate for smaller government.

In 1993, Scott and Senator Louis F. Kosco co-sponsored legislation to impose a commuter tax on New York residents who worked in New Jersey based on their total family income, which Kosco described as "retaliatory legislation" on behalf of the 230,000 New Jersey residents who worked in New York and were assessed taxes by that state on their income.

Scott lost his seat in November 1997 to Democrat Garry Furnari. Furnari won with 55% of the vote, taking the seat of what The New York Times described as "one of the most conservative Republicans in the Legislature".

He worked for New Jersey Transit after leaving elected office. Scott and his wife moved to Dingman Township, Pike County, Pennsylvania in August 2001. There he was a founder of the Dingman Township Republican Club and served on the Pike County Republican Committee. He ran in May 2007 in the Republican Party primary for the part-time position of Pike County Auditor. While in Pennsylvania, he served as an advisor to the political campaigns of several Republican candidates.

Scott died at age 76 on May 21, 2010.
