= Robert P. Hollenbeck =

American politician (1931–2021)

Member of the New Jersey General Assembly from the 36th district
- In office January 8, 1974 – January 7, 1986
- Preceded by: District created
- Succeeded by: Paul DiGaetano; Kathleen Donovan

Personal details
- Born: November 5, 1931 Carlstadt, New Jersey, U.S.
- Died: September 5, 2021 (aged 89)
- Party: Democratic
- Spouse: Rosalie Den Bleyker
- Children: three

Robert P. Hollenbeck Sr. (November 5, 1931 – September 5, 2021) was an American Democratic Party politician who served six terms in the New Jersey General Assembly from the 36th Legislative District.

== Biography ==
Hollenbeck was born in Carlstadt and graduated from East Rutherford High School. A veteran of the Korean War, he attended Albright College in Reading, Pennsylvania and technical trade schools before becoming a supervisor for Public Service Electric and Gas. He is a cousin of Congressman Harold C. Hollenbeck.

He was elected to the Carlstadt Borough Council for two separate terms— from 1965 to 1968 and from 1970 to 1973. He also served on the board of the Carlstadt Sewer Authority including being chairman. In 1973, Hollenbeck and Richard F. Visotcky were elected to the General Assembly from the newly created 36th district defeating incumbent Republican Assemblyman Peter J. Russo and East Rutherford mayor James L. Plosia. Hollenbeck and Visotcky would be reelected five more times on the Democratic ticket. Hollenbeck was appointed chair of the Assembly Energy and Natural Resources Committee in 1980 and would eventually chair the Assembly Agriculture and Environment Committee. While in the Assembly, he sponsored legislation regarding the state's water supply master plan (which helped create the Manasquan Reservoir) and allowing for right turns at red traffic lights.

In 1985, both Hollenbeck and Visotcky were defeated by Republicans Paul DiGaetano and Kathleen Donovan in the general election. In addition to the coattails from Thomas Kean's landslide victory in the gubernatorial election, DiGaetano and Donovan also criticized the Assembly's policy of allowing a free buffet lunch to legislators while in session which the two incumbents had partaken.

Hollenbeck moved to Barnegat Township later in life. He died on September 5, 2021.
