= Thomas J. Duch =

American public servant and politician

Member of the New Jersey General Assembly from the 36th district
- In office January 12, 1988 – January 7, 1992
- Preceded by: Paul DiGaetano; Kathleen Donovan
- Succeeded by: Paul DiGaetano; John V. Kelly

Mayor of Garfield
- In office 1980–1988

Personal details
- Born: September 3, 1956 (age 70) Passaic, New Jersey, U.S.
- Party: Democratic
- Spouse: Cheryl
- Children: Nicole, Thomas, Michael, and Timothy
- Education: Lehigh University; Seton Hall University School of Law
- Occupation: City manager; attorney

Thomas J. Duch (born September 3, 1956) is an American public servant and Democratic Party politician from Bergen County, New Jersey.

== Biography ==
Duch was born in 1956 in Passaic to Thomas and Helen O. Duch. His brother John Gregory Duch (1960–2017) would follow Thomas in serving in Garfield city government. He graduated from Garfield High School, received a B.A. in government from Lehigh University in 1978, and a J.D. from Seton Hall University School of Law in 1981; he was admitted to the bar that same year. He practices law at a firm in Elmwood Park, New Jersey. In 1980, at the age of 23, Duch was elected mayor of Garfield; he was reelected in 1984.

In 1987, Duch and running mate Passaic Council President Louis J. Gill defeated Republican candidates Frank B. Calandriello and Andrew E. Bertone for two seats in the New Jersey General Assembly from the 36th district after the two incumbent Republicans chose not to run for reelection. The two were reelected in 1989. In 1990, Duch cast one of the final votes in favor of Governor James Florio's unpopular income tax increases. In the 1991 elections, following a redistricting which moved Garfield into the 38th district, Duch and his new running mate Frank Biasco were defeated by incumbent Republican Assembly members Patrick J. Roma and Rose Marie Heck.

Duch would later move to Wyckoff. In 2003, he was hired as the city manager for Garfield. In 2017, he was the Democratic nominee for the New Jersey Senate from the 40th district. However, he was defeated in the general election by appointed Republican incumbent Kristin Corrado. A park along the Dundee Dam in Garfield, land which began to be acquired by the city during Duch's mayoralty, was renamed for Duch in 2016.

In 2017, Duch was named in a racial discrimination lawsuit by two DPW employees who alleged severe mistreatment by Garfield officials. Regarding Duch, the suit claims that he failed to carry out the required investigation into their initial complaints then denied their attempts to follow up on the matter by filing a grievance. In denying their grievance, Duch wrote “I do not know your nationality nor do I need to know. Everyone is treated the same. To imply some type of discrimination is simply outrageous. Your grievance is denied.” The two workers accepted a settlement from the city of Garfield, preventing the matter from being heard in court.

Duch took the position as Bergen County Administrator in June 2021, succeeding Julien X. Neals who had been appointed as a federal judge.
