= Paul Sarlo =

Member of the New Jersey Senate

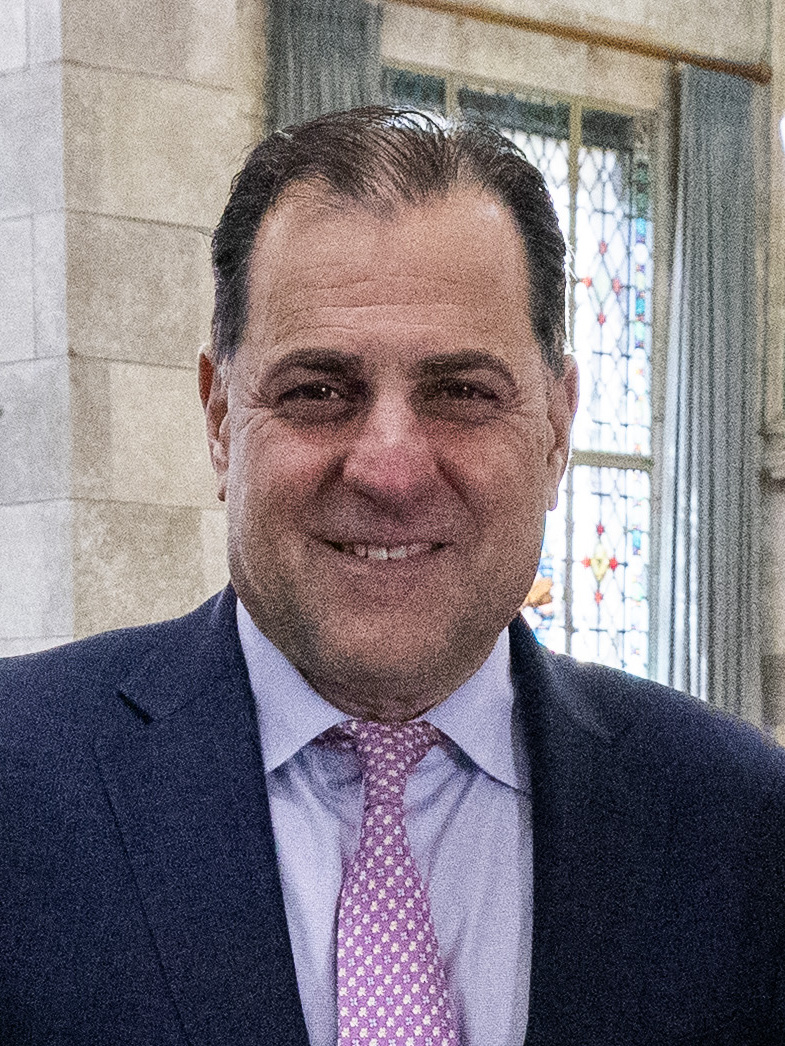
- Sarlo in 2025

Member of the New Jersey Senate from the 36th district
- Incumbent
- Assumed office May 19, 2003
- Preceded by: Garry Furnari

Member of the New Jersey General Assembly from the 36th district
- In office January 8, 2002 – May 19, 2003 Serving with Paul DiGaetano
- Preceded by: John V. Kelly
- Succeeded by: Frederick Scalera

Personal details
- Born: August 31, 1968 (age 58) Passaic, New Jersey, U.S.
- Party: Democratic
- Spouse: Concetta Maria (m. 1997)
- Children: 2
- Education: New Jersey Institute of Technology (BS, MS)
- Website: Official website

Paul Anthony Sarlo (born August 31, 1968) is an Italian-American construction industry executive and Democratic Party politician who has served in the New Jersey Senate since 2003, where he represents the 36th legislative district. Sarlo is a former assistant majority leader of the Senate, a position held from 2004 until 2007. He has been the deputy majority leader of the Senate since 2008 and is also mayor of the borough of Wood-Ridge, New Jersey.

== Personal life ==
Sarlo was born in Passaic on August 31, 1968, at St. Mary's General Hospital to pipefitter and construction supervisor Anthony Sarlo and Providence Munofo, along with his siblings, Diane, Charles and Tom. He grew up in Wood-Ridge, New Jersey, and graduated from Wood-Ridge High School in 1986, where he was a scholar-athlete, earning varsity letters in football, basketball and baseball. He was named First Team All-Division and All-County in baseball and was inducted into the Wood-Ridge High School Athletic Hall of Fame in 2014.

Sarlo studied civil engineering at the New Jersey Institute of Technology, earning both a B.S. in 1991 and an M.S. in 1993.

He is chief operating officer of Joseph M. Sanzari, Inc., a general contractor specializing in heavy construction, site work and utilities located in Hackensack near Interstate 80. Sarlo has overseen more than $150 million in projects and has worked with a skilled workforce of more than 200 employees. He worked on the Route 4 and Route 17 interchange near Westfield Garden State Plaza in Paramus, which was completed two years ahead of schedule. He has been a supporter of the construction of LG Electronics USA's headquarters in Englewood Cliffs, abutting The Palisades near the George Washington Bridge.

He married Concetta Maria Sarlo in 1997. Three years later, she became the First Lady of Wood-Ridge on January 1, 2000 following the swearing in of her husband as mayor. Additionally he has two sons named Michael Paul Sarlo and Anthony Joesph Sarlo. Both of Sarlo's sons attended Wood-Ridge Public Schools and participated in the town’s recreation programs. Anthony graduated Lafayette College in 2022 with a bachelor’s degree in civil engineering. Currently Anthony works as a Project Engineer along with his dad at Joesph M Sanzari, Inc. Michael is currently at U.S. Naval Academy as a member of the Class of 2027. Sarlo serves as an Executive Board Member on the NJSIAA as an ex officio member. His brother Thomas has been a councilman in Little Ferry and was appointed to the New Jersey Superior Court in January 2024.

== Mayor of Wood-Ridge ==
Sarlo has served as Mayor of the Borough of Wood-Ridge since January 1, 2000. He was re-elected in 2003, 2007, 2011, 2015, 2019, and most recently 2023. He was a Councilman from 1995 to 2000 and served as Fire Commissioner.

As Mayor, Sarlo has overseen the redevelopment of the former Curtiss-Wright aircraft manufacturing site in Wood-Ridge, which is now known as Wesmont Station. The project includes a new train station called Wesmont station that opened on May 15, 2016. Nearly 500 units have already been built with an additional 300 units planned to start construction in 2015. The area includes softball and baseball fields as well as a new indoor complex known as the Wood-Ridge Athletic Complex slated to open in 2022.

During Sarlo's tenure as Mayor over 50% of the town's roads have been resurfaced, over 1,000 new trees have been planted, 14th Street Field was built, Donna Ricker Field at Wood-Ridge High School was upgraded with artificial turf, the Robert I. Stoesser The senior center and civic center were renovated and completed in 2012–2013 and Historic Bianchi House was preserved and improved. Additionally, Bowman Park on Jocelyn Avenue, Veterans Park on Valley Boulevard and Bianchi House Park on 2nd Street were all rehabilitated. In 2013 the former Assumption parochial school was transformed into the Wood-Ridge Intermediate School for grades 4 to 6. Plans were in place to upgrade 14th Street Playground, Kohr's Park on 13th Street and the Little League Field on 6th Street in 2014–2015.

On January 1, 2024, Sarlo was sworn into his seventh term as Wood-Ridge Mayor.

Sarlo is a licensed professional engineer and a licensed Professional Planner. He and his wife, Concetta First Lady of Wood-Ridge, have two sons, Anthony (born in 2000), and Michael (born in 2004). Sarlo coaches Little League and Babe Ruth League baseball, Junior football and Junior basketball. He is a parishioner at the Catholic Church of Our Lady of the Assumption Church, is a member of the Lions Club International and the Knights of Columbus and is an honorary member of the New Jersey Policemen's Benevolent Association.

== Political career ==
Before his service as State Senator, Sarlo spent one term in the General Assembly, the lower house of the New Jersey Legislature, from 2002 to 2003. He and then-Wallington, New Jersey, mayor Walter Wargacki sought to unseat Republican incumbent Paul DiGaetano and take the second seat that was vacated when John V. Kelly decided to challenge for the State Senate (which he lost). Although the Democrats did not gain both seats, Sarlo finished second in the voting and won a seat.

As an Assemblyman, he served as Vice Chairman of the Labor Committee and as a member of the Appropriations Committee. He was a member of the Assembly Light Rail Panel and the Assembly Task Force on Fiscal Responsibility. While in the Assembly, Sarlo was the prime sponsor of the bill creating a $29 million grant to establish a statewide bio-terrorism response plan. He also sponsored legislation to restore the Office of Public Advocate and to provide benefits and incentives for members of volunteer fire departments and rescue squads. He has also taken leading roles on legislation related to the health and welfare of women and children.

Sarlo was appointed as state senator when former District 36 Senator Garry Furnari, an attorney, and mayor of Nutley, was appointed to the New Jersey Superior Court. Sarlo had been the choice of Bergen County, New Jersey Democratic Organization Chairman Joe Ferriero to succeed Furnari. After he was appointed to the State Senate, Frederick Scalera was appointed to fill his vacant seat in the Assembly.

In the 2003 general election, Sarlo was challenged by former New Jersey General Assembly member John V. Kelly. Sarlo outspent Kelly by a nearly three-to-one margin in a pivotal race at a time when the Senate was evenly split between the two major parties and a change in party for any one seat could tip control of the upper house. Democrats won full control of the Senate and Sarlo won election to a full term in office by a margin of 53–44%. Exactly one year after being elected to the state senate Sarlo would serve as Assistant Majority Leader from 2004 to 2007 under Majority Leader Bernard Kenny from Jersey City, New Jersey. Sarlo was re-elected in 2007 by defeating Michael Guarino and in 2011 by defeating Donald DiOrio.

In the Senate for the 2018–19 session, Sarlo serves on the Budget and Appropriations Committee (as Chair), the Higher Education Committee, the Judiciary Committee and the Legislative Oversight Committee. On November 23, 2009, the New Jersey Senate Democrats chose Sarlo to replace Barbara Buono, who was chosen to be Majority Leader, replacing Stephen Sweeney, who became President of the New Jersey Senate, on January 12, 2010. Sarlo was Chairman-designate of the Senate Budget and Appropriations Committee and began his chairmanship on January 12, 2010. He was also on the 2011 New Jersey Apportionment Commission, the committee delegated to redraw the state legislative districts following the 2010 Census.

Sarlo has been a long-time proponent of the EnCap proposal to build golf courses and homes on remediated landfills in the New Jersey Meadowlands. He sponsored a bill in 2004 that enabled three Meadowlands communities -- Lyndhurst, North Arlington, and Rutherford—to negotiate their own deals with EnCap under which the impacted area municipalities would receive 40% - 50% of all future tax revenues.

A judge knocked Sarlo's 2007 GOP opponent, Michael Guarino, off the ballot, ruling that the outspoken critic of the EnCap project had not collected enough valid signatures to qualify for a ballot position. Even though Guarino was knocked off the ballot because of a lack of signatures, he received enough write-in votes to win the GOP nomination.

Sarlo served five years on the Wood-Ridge Borough Council (1995–2000). Since 2000, Sarlo has served as the mayor of Wood-Ridge Borough. He was Borough Engineer for the Borough of Carlstadt from 1998 to 2009 but had to step down due to a conflict of interest and is currently serving in the New Jersey State Senate as Assistant Deputy Majority Leader to Senator Majority Leader Teresa Ruiz since January 11, 2022, and from 2012 to 2022 under Loretta Weinberg. Sarlo is also the chief operating officer of Joseph M. Sanzari, Inc.

He simultaneously holds a seat in the New Jersey Senate and as Mayor. This dual position, often called double dipping, is allowed under a grandfather clause in a 2007 state law that prevents dual officeholding, but allows those who had held both positions as of February 1, 2008, to retain both posts.

In 2009, Sarlo said he remained opposed to gay marriage, despite also saying the "tide has turned" on the issue.

In February 2019, Sarlo recommended that Mark Musella, a 56-year-old attorney also from Wood-Ridge, should be chosen to replace outgoing Bergen County Prosecutor Gurbir Grewal. Musella became Bergen Country Prosecutor on May 20, 2019, four months after Sarlo had made the recommendation.

In April 2019, Sarlo had made a statement on the Newark water crisis by saying, "The United States of America is not a Third World developing country. In America, people should never, ever have to live in fear that the water they drink could sicken them or cause disabilities in their young children."

On February 24, 2022, Sarlo announced that he would introduce legislation that would bar public entities in New Jersey from doing business with Russia or Russia-tied companies in response to the 2022 Russian invasion of Ukraine. In the statement he said, "Russia's unjustified attack of Ukraine is an assault on democracy that demands a response that sends a clear message that these actions will have consequences," Sarlo said in a statement. "They violated the sovereignty of another country with complete disregard for the lives of innocent people. This demands a response by everyone who respects freedom and values human rights."

On August 20, 2024, Sarlo was inducted into the National Academy of Construction, an organization headquartered at the University of Texas at Austin in Austin, Texas. Just one day later Sarlo's long-time friend and political ally Congressman Bill Pascrell Jr died at the age of 87 after losing a battle with a respiratory illness. The following statement that Mr. Sarlo put out following the death was, "We have lost one of our strongest, most impassioned leaders – and one of my best friends in public service. Bill Pascrell represented my hometown of Wood-Ridge and southern Bergen County in Congress, fighting for the needs of our communities and all our residents. I will always value the memory of Congressman Pascrell swearing me in when I first took the oath of office as Mayor of Wood-Ridge in 2000. Bill and I proudly shared our Italian-American heritage, and we both recognized the strength of diversity in New Jersey and our country. He made a lasting impact in a life of service. My sympathies to his wife Elsie, their sons, and the Pascrell family in this time of loss."

On November 25, 2024 Governor Phil Murphy signed Mr. Sarlo's sponsored bill S-3608, that allows for the continuation of an expansion in operations that proved successful during the COVID-19 pandemic in the United States. This passed with unanimous bipartisanship in both The New Jersey Assembly and The New Jersey State Senate. Following the signing of the bill Sarlo commented, "The outdoor service initiated during the pandemic proved to be a real success for restaurants and the communities they serve. It was good for the economy, beneficial for downtown business districts and very popular with patrons and residents. It put people to work, generated economic activity and brought new life to local communities. It is a success story that is well worth continuing."

In January 2025, Sarlo referred to transgender women as "men" and voiced support for banning transgender women from women's sports.

On July 30, 2026, Sarlo issued a statement regarding the tragedy at Passaic River that claimed the life of a 10-year old boy: "My sincere condolences are with the families, friends, and communities affected by this tragedy along the Passaic River. We mourn the heartbreaking loss of a brave young boy whose selfless actions helped save his sister's life. No family should ever have to endure such an unimaginable heartbreak. As the search continues, we pray for the safe return of the young girl who remains missing and for strength and comfort for everyone impacted.

"I am deeply grateful to our state and local first responders, including the firefighters, police officers, Bergen and Passaic County OEM, New Jersey State Police, and every volunteer working tirelessly through difficult conditions in their search efforts. Their courage, professionalism, and unwavering commitment to serving others and getting answers for the families represent the very best of New Jersey public service."

=== Committees ===
Committee assignments for the 2024—2025 Legislative Session are:

- Budget and Appropriations (as chair)
- Judiciary

=== District 36 ===
Each of the 40 districts in the New Jersey Legislature has one representative in the New Jersey Senate and two members in the New Jersey General Assembly. The representatives from the 36th District for the 2024—2025 Legislative Session are:

- Senator Paul Sarlo (D)
- Assemblyman Clinton Calabrese (D)
- Assemblyman Gary Schaer (D)

== Election history ==
36th Legislative District General Election, 2023
Party	Candidate	Votes	%
Democratic	Paul A. Sarlo (incumbent)	18,885	61.7
Republican	Chris Auriemma	11,744	38.3
Total votes		30,629	100.0
Democratic hold			

36th Legislative District general election, 2021
Party	Candidate	Votes	%
Democratic	Paul A. Sarlo (incumbent)	25,373	56.86
Republican	Chris Auriemma	19,252	43.14
Total votes		44,625	100.0
Democratic hold			

36th Legislative District general election, 2017
Party	Candidate	Votes	%	±%
Democratic	Paul A. Sarlo (incumbent)	24,044	65.8	▲6.1
Republican	Jeanine Ferrara	12,482	34.2	▼6.1
Total votes		36,526	100.0	
Democratic hold				

New Jersey State Senate elections, 2013
Party	Candidate	Votes	%
Democratic	Paul Sarlo (incumbent)	22,677	59.7
Republican	Brian A. Fitzhenry	15,293	40.3
Democratic hold			

New Jersey State Senate elections, 2011
Party	Candidate	Votes	%
Democratic	Paul A. Sarlo (incumbent)	18,582	62.7
Republican	Donald D. DiOrio	11,055	37.3
Democratic hold			

New Jersey State Senate elections, 2007
Party	Candidate	Votes	%
Democratic	Paul A. Sarlo (incumbent)	14,895	56.8
Republican	Michael A. Guarino	11,317	43.2
Democratic hold			

New Jersey State Senate elections, 2003
Party	Candidate	Votes	%
Democratic	Paul A. Sarlo (incumbent)	18,035	53.2
Republican	John V. Kelly	14,964	44.2
Independent	Richard Delaosa	496	1.5
Independent	Maximo Moscoso	348	1.2
Democratic hold			

== Honors and distinctions ==
While playing baseball as a NJIT student-athlete from 1989 to 1991, Sarlo earned NCAA Division III All-American honors. As a senior, he was named the Independent Athletic Conference Player of the Year. In 2005, he was inducted into the NJIT Athletic Hall of Fame in 2005 for his accomplishments on the field, which include holding the program's highest single-season batting average.

NJIT awarded Sarlo an honorary degree of Doctor of Science at its May 17, 2022 Commencement Ceremony.

New Jersey General Assembly
Preceded by John V. Kelly	Member of the New Jersey General Assembly from the 36th district 2002–2003; Served alongside: Paul DiGaetano	Succeeded by Frederick Scalera
New Jersey Senate
Preceded by Garry Furnari	Member of the New Jersey Senate from the 36th district 2003–present	Incumbent
