= Richard F. Visotcky =

American politician

Member of the New Jersey General Assembly from the 36th district
- In office January 8, 1974 – January 7, 1986
- Preceded by: District created
- Succeeded by: Paul DiGaetano; Kathleen Donovan

Personal details
- Born: October 3, 1929 Garfield, New Jersey, U.S.
- Died: November 2, 2002 (aged 73)
- Party: Democratic
- Spouse: Lois Jean Pantess
- Children: 2

Richard F. Visotcky (October 3, 1929 – November 2, 2002) was an American Democratic Party politician who served as mayor of Garfield, New Jersey for six terms was a member of the New Jersey General Assembly.

== Biography ==
Visotcky was born in Garfield in 1929 and attended Garfield High School. He worked as an office representative for Public Service Electric & Gas Company. He also served as city treasurer for Garfield, was elected to the city council there, and eventually became mayor of the city from 1970 to 1972.

In 1973, Visotcky and Robert P. Hollenbeck were elected to the General Assembly from the newly created 36th district, defeating incumbent Republican Assemblyman Peter J. Russo and East Rutherford mayor James L. Plosia. Visotcky and Hollenbeck would be reelected five more times on the Democratic ticket. Visotcky introduced legislation that would provide pharmaceutical assistance to elderly and disabled people. In 1980, he introduced a resolution that would make Bruce Springsteen's song "Born to Run" the unofficial anthem of the New Jersey's youth.

In 1985, both Visotcky and Hollenbeck were defeated by Republicans Paul DiGaetano and Kathleen Donovan in the general election. In addition to the coattails from Thomas Kean's landslide victory in the gubernatorial election, DiGaetano and Donovan also criticized the Assembly's policy of allowing a free buffet lunch to legislators while in session which the two incumbents had partaken. Visotcky and his wife, the former Lois Jean Pantess, moved to the Manahawkin section of Stafford Township, New Jersey in the early 1990s. His son, Richard P. Visotkcy, would run unsuccessfully for the Assembly in the 9th district in 2009.

He died on November 2, 2002, survived by his wife and their two sons, Richard P. and Robert John.
