= New Jersey's 36th legislative district =

American legislative district

- Senator: Paul Sarlo (D)
- Assembly members: Clinton Calabrese (D); Gary Schaer (D)
- Registration: 40.6% Democratic; 18.2% Republican; 39.8% unaffiliated
- Demographics: 45.6% White; 4.8% Black/African American; 1.4% Native American; 10.6% Asian; 0.0% Hawaiian/Pacific Islander; 24.0% Other race; 13.6% Two or more races; 42.2% Hispanic
- Population: 234,046
- Voting-age population: 182,166
- Registered voters: 131,357

New Jersey's 36th legislative district is one of 40 districts that make up the map for the New Jersey Legislature. It encompasses the Bergen County municipalities of Carlstadt, Cliffside Park, East Rutherford, Edgewater, Fairview, Lyndhurst, North Arlington, Ridgefield, Rutherford, Wallington, and Wood-Ridge and the city of Passaic in Passaic County.

== Demographic information ==
As of the 2020 United States census, the district had a population of 234,046, of whom 182,166 (77.8%) were of voting age. The racial makeup of the district was 106,691 (45.6%) White, 11,210 (4.8%) African American, 3,203 (1.4%) Native American, 24,777 (10.6%) Asian, 91 (0.0%) Pacific Islander, 56,173 (24.0%) from some other race, and 31,901 (13.6%) from two or more races. Hispanic or Latino of any race were 98,871 (42.2%) of the population.

The district had 131,357 registered voters as of December 1, 2023, of whom 52,504 (40.0%) were registered as Democrats, 51,911 (39.5%) were registered as unaffiliated, 25,221 (19.2%) were registered as Republicans, and 1,721 (1.3%) were registered to other parties.

== Political representation ==
For the 2026–2027 session, the 36th legislative district of the New Jersey Legislature is represented in the State Senate by Paul Sarlo (D, Wood-Ridge) and in the General Assembly by Clinton Calabrese (D, Cliffside Park) and Gary Schaer (D, Passaic).

The legislative district overlaps with the New Jersey's 5th and 9th congressional districts.

== Apportionment history ==
When the 40-district legislative map was created in 1973, the 36th district consisted of southern Bergen County starting at the south end in North Arlington then north along the Passaic River to Garfield and a spur to Bogota via Carlstadt, Moonachie, Ridgefield, Fairview, Palisades Park, and Ridgefield Park. In the 1981 redistricting, the city of Passaic joined the district as did Wood-Ridge, Teterboro, and South Hackensack; Fairview, Palisades Park, Ridgefield Park, and Bogota were moved to other districts during this time. The Bergen County portion of the district was reduced in the 1991 redistricting leaving only municipalities south of Wallington and Carlstadt in the district; in addition to Passaic remaining, Essex County's Nutley and Belleville were added to the district. Garfield, Wood-Ridge, and Moonachie were reintroduced to the district in the 2001 redistricting though Belleville was moved to the 28th district at this point.

In December 2017, Marlene Caride was nominated by incoming Governor Phil Murphy to head the New Jersey Department of Banking and Insurance, a cabinet-level position; she resigned January 16, 2018, to take the position on an acting basis and was confirmed to the post on June 7. Democratic committee members in Bergen and Passaic Counties unanimously selected Clinton Calabrese as her replacement; he was sworn in on February 8.

== Election history ==
Session	Senate	General Assembly	
1974–1975	Anthony Scardino (D)	Robert P. Hollenbeck (D)	Richard F. Visotcky (D)
1976–1977	Anthony Scardino (D)	Robert P. Hollenbeck (D)	Richard F. Visotcky (D)
1978–1979	Anthony Scardino (D) (Note: Resigned on December 31, 1980, to become executive director of the Hackensack Meadowlands Development Commission)	Robert P. Hollenbeck (D)	Richard F. Visotcky (D)
1980–1981	Anthony Scardino (D)	Robert P. Hollenbeck (D)	Richard F. Visotcky (D)
1980–1981	Seat vacant	Robert P. Hollenbeck (D)	Richard F. Visotcky (D)
1982–1983	Joseph Hirkala (D)	Robert P. Hollenbeck (D)	Richard F. Visotcky (D)
1984–1985	Joseph Hirkala (D) (Note: Died January 1, 1987)	Robert P. Hollenbeck (D)	Richard F. Visotcky (D)
1986–1987	Joseph Hirkala (D)	Kathleen Donovan (R)	Paul DiGaetano (R)
1986–1987	Gabriel M. Ambrosio (D) (Note: Won March 1987 special election, sworn in on April 23, 1987)	Kathleen Donovan (R)	Paul DiGaetano (R)
1988–1989	Gabriel M. Ambrosio (D)	Louis J. Gill (D)	Thomas J. Duch (D)
1990–1991	Gabriel M. Ambrosio (D)	Louis J. Gill (D)	Thomas J. Duch (D)
1992–1993	John P. Scott (R)	John V. Kelly (R)	Paul DiGaetano (R)
1994–1995	John P. Scott (R)	John V. Kelly (R)	Paul DiGaetano (R)
1996–1997	John P. Scott (R)	John V. Kelly (R)	Paul DiGaetano (R)
1998–1999	Garry Furnari (D)	John V. Kelly (R)	Paul DiGaetano (R)
2000–2001	Garry Furnari (D)	John V. Kelly (R)	Paul DiGaetano (R)
2002–2003	Garry Furnari (D) (Note: Resigned on May 8, 2003 to become a Superior Court judge)	Paul Sarlo (D) (Note: Appointed to the Senate on May 19, 2003)	Paul DiGaetano (R)
2002–2003	Paul Sarlo (D)	Frederick Scalera (D) (Note: Appointed to the Assembly on May 22, 2003)	Paul DiGaetano (R)
2004–2005	Paul Sarlo (D)	Frederick Scalera (D)	Paul DiGaetano (R)
2006–2007	Paul Sarlo (D)	Frederick Scalera (D)	Gary Schaer (D)
2008–2009	Paul Sarlo (D)	Frederick Scalera (D)	Gary Schaer (D)
2010–2011	Paul Sarlo (D)	Frederick Scalera (D) (Note: Resigned November 29, 2010)	Gary Schaer (D)
2010–2011	Paul Sarlo (D)	Kevin J. Ryan (D) (Note: Appointed to the Assembly on January 6, 2011)	Gary Schaer (D)
2012–2013	Paul Sarlo (D)	Marlene Caride (D)	Gary Schaer (D)
2014–2015	Paul Sarlo (D)	Marlene Caride (D)	Gary Schaer (D)
2016–2017	Paul Sarlo (D)	Marlene Caride (D)	Gary Schaer (D)
2018–2019	Paul Sarlo (D)	Marlene Caride (D) (Note: Resigned on January 16, 2018, to become Commissioner of Banking and Insurance)	Gary Schaer (D)
2018–2019	Paul Sarlo (D)	Clinton Calabrese (D) (Note: Appointed to the Assembly on February 8, 2018, won a November 6, 2018 special election to complete unexpired term)	Gary Schaer (D)
2020–2021	Paul Sarlo (D)	Clinton Calabrese (D)	Gary Schaer (D)
2022–2023	Paul Sarlo (D)	Clinton Calabrese (D)	Gary Schaer (D)
2024–2025	Paul Sarlo (D)	Clinton Calabrese (D)	Gary Schaer (D)
2026–2027	Paul Sarlo (D)	Clinton Calabrese (D)	Gary Schaer (D)

== Election results ==
=== Senate ===
2021 New Jersey general election
Party	Candidate	Votes	%	±%
Democratic	Paul Sarlo	25,373	56.9	▼8.9
Republican	Chris Auriemma	19,252	43.1	▲8.9
Total votes		44,625	100.0	

New Jersey general election, 2017
Party	Candidate	Votes	%	±%
Democratic	Paul Sarlo	24,044	65.8	▲6.1
Republican	Jeanine Ferrara	12,482	34.2	▼6.1
Total votes		36,526	100.0	

New Jersey general election, 2013
Party	Candidate	Votes	%	±%
Democratic	Paul Sarlo	22,677	59.7	▼3.0
Republican	Brian A. Fitzhenry	15,293	40.3	▲3.0
Total votes		37,970	100.0	

2011 New Jersey general election
Party	Candidate	Votes	%
Democratic	Paul Sarlo	18,582	62.7
Republican	Donald E. DiOrio	11,055	37.3
Total votes		29,637	100.0

2007 New Jersey general election
Party	Candidate	Votes	%	±%
Democratic	Paul Sarlo	14,895	56.8	▲3.5
Republican	Michael A. Guarino	11,317	43.2	▼1.0
Total votes		26,212	100.0	

2003 New Jersey general election
Party	Candidate	Votes	%	±%
Democratic	Paul Sarlo	18,035	53.3	▲2.5
Republican	John V. Kelly	14,964	44.2	▼3.6
Tax the Rich	Richard DelaRosa	496	1.5	N/A
Real Pro-Choice	Maximo Moscoso	348	1.0	N/A
Total votes		33,843	100.0	

2001 New Jersey general election
Party	Candidate	Votes	%
Democratic	Garry J. Furnari	22,914	50.8
Republican	John V. Kelly	21,571	47.8
Green Coalition	Joseph Farallo	642	1.4
Total votes		45,127	100.0

1997 New Jersey general election
Party	Candidate	Votes	%	±%
Democratic	Garry J. Furnari	25,844	53.1	▲6.0
Republican	John P. Scott	22,806	46.9	▼6.0
Total votes		48,650	100.0	

1993 New Jersey general election
Party	Candidate	Votes	%	±%
Republican	John P. Scott	28,020	52.9	▲0.9
Democratic	Gabe Ambrosio	24,945	47.1	▼0.9
Total votes		52,965	100.0	

1991 New Jersey general election
Party	Candidate	Votes	%
Republican	John P. Scott	21,455	52.0
Democratic	Gabe Ambrosio	19,775	48.0
Total votes		41,230	100.0

1987 New Jersey general election
Party	Candidate	Votes	%	±%
Democratic	Gabriel M. Ambrosio	22,746	51.2	▼8.4
Republican	Kathleen A. Donovan	21,716	48.8	▲8.4
Total votes		44,462	100.0	

Special election, March 24, 1987
Party	Candidate	Votes	%	±%
Democratic	Gabriel M. Ambrosio	11,462	59.6	▲1.3
Republican	Paul DiGaetano	7,763	40.4	▼1.3
Total votes		19,225	100.0	

1983 New Jersey general election
Party	Candidate	Votes	%	±%
Democratic	Joseph Hirkala	28,325	58.3	▲2.9
Republican	Joseph F. Job	20,222	41.7	▼0.3
Total votes		48,547	100.0	

1981 New Jersey general election
Party	Candidate	Votes	%
Democratic	Joseph Hirkala	30,422	55.4
Republican	Philip R. Gervato	23,049	42.0
Bergen Home Rule	Edna M. Perrotta	1,395	2.5
Total votes		54,866	100.0

1977 New Jersey general election
Party	Candidate	Votes	%	±%
Democratic	Anthony Scardino, Jr.	31,466	63.9	▲1.9
Republican	Harold A. Pareti	17,805	36.1	▼0.7
Total votes		49,271	100.0	

1973 New Jersey general election
Party	Candidate	Votes	%
Democratic	Anthony Scardino, Jr.	35,953	62.0
Republican	Harold A. Pareti	21,332	36.8
Socialist Labor	Kenneth Kowalczyk	698	1.2
Total votes		57,983	100.0

=== General Assembly ===
2021 New Jersey general election
Party	Candidate	Votes	%	±%
Democratic	Gary S. Schaer	24,654	28.4	▼2.4
Democratic	Clinton Calabrese	24,137	27.8	▼2.7
Republican	Joseph Viso Jr.	19,025	21.9	▲2.5
Republican	Craig Auriemma	19,008	21.9	▲2.6
Total votes		86,824	100.0	

2019 New Jersey general election
Party	Candidate	Votes	%	±%
Democratic	Gary S. Schaer	16,747	30.8	▼1.1
Democratic	Clinton Calabrese	16,622	30.5	▼1.3
Republican	Foster Lowe	10,561	19.4	▲0.6
Republican	Khaldoun Androwis	10,496	19.3	▲1.8
Total votes		54,426	100.0	

Special election, November 6, 2018
Party	Candidate	Votes	%
Democratic	Clinton Calabrese	36,914	63.8
Republican	Marc Marsi	20,946	36.2
Total votes		57,860	100.0

New Jersey general election, 2017
Party	Candidate	Votes	%	±%
Democratic	Gary Schaer	22,527	31.9	▼1.2
Democratic	Marlene Caride	22,419	31.8	▼0.6
Republican	Paul Passamano Jr.	13,245	18.8	▲1.7
Republican	Marc Marsi	12,372	17.5	▲1.1
Total votes		70,563	100.0	

New Jersey general election, 2015
Party	Candidate	Votes	%	±%
Democratic	Gary Schaer	15,125	33.1	▲3.9
Democratic	Marlene Caride	14,788	32.4	▲4.0
Republican	Forrest Elliott Jr.	7,835	17.1	▼4.5
Republican	James A. Lenoy	7,510	16.4	▼4.4
NSA Did 911	Jeff Boss	430	0.9	N/A
Total votes		45,688	100.0	

New Jersey general election, 2013
Party	Candidate	Votes	%	±%
Democratic	Gary Schaer	21,131	29.2	▼1.3
Democratic	Marlene Caride	20,520	28.4	▼0.4
Republican	Rosina Romano	15,631	21.6	▲0.9
Republican	Foster Lowe	15,014	20.8	▲0.9
Total votes		72,296	100.0	

New Jersey general election, 2011
Party	Candidate	Votes	%
Democratic	Gary Schaer	17,262	30.5
Democratic	Marlene Caride	16,319	28.8
Republican	Sara Rosengarten	11,735	20.7
Republican	John C. Genovesi	11,256	19.9
Total votes		56,572	100.0

New Jersey general election, 2009
Party	Candidate	Votes	%	±%
Democratic	Frederick Scalera	23,353	29.5	▲0.7
Democratic	Gary S. Schaer	22,089	27.9	▲0.9
Republican	Carmen Pio Costa	17,035	21.5	▼0.5
Republican	Donald Diorio	16,691	21.1	▼1.1
Total votes		79,168	100.0	

New Jersey general election, 2007
Party	Candidate	Votes	%	±%
Democratic	Frederick Scalera	14,619	28.8	▼3.3
Democratic	Gary Schaer	13,687	27.0	▼2.7
Republican	Donald E. Diorio	11,263	22.2	▲3.6
Republican	Carmen Pio Costa	11,151	22.0	▲3.4
Total votes		50,720	100.0	

New Jersey general election, 2005
Party	Candidate	Votes	%	±%
Democratic	Frederick Scalera	26,606	32.1	▲7.3
Democratic	Gary Schaer	24,645	29.7	▲6.3
Republican	Jose M. Sandoval	15,414	18.6	▼7.5
Republican	Louis G. Aloia	15,399	18.6	▼4.2
Green	Stewart Kautsch	793	1.0	N/A
Total votes		82,857	100.0	

New Jersey general election, 2003
Party	Candidate	Votes	%	±%
Republican	Paul DiGaetano	17,144	26.1	▼0.7
Democratic	Frederick Scalera	16,244	24.8	0.0
Democratic	Imre Karaszegi Jr	15,386	23.4	0.0
Republican	Richard J. DiLascio	14,942	22.8	▼0.4
Real Pro-Choice	Geovanni Regalado	581	0.9	N/A
Tax the Rich	Crystal Delarosa	491	0.7	N/A
Tax the Rich	Rafael Sanchez	474	0.7	▲0.2
Real Pro-Choice	John Zazanis	368	0.6	0.0
Total votes		65,630	100.0	

New Jersey general election, 2001
Party	Candidate	Votes	%
Republican	Paul DiGaetano	23,563	26.8
Democratic	Paul Sarlo	21,811	24.8
Democratic	Walter G. Wargacki	20,554	23.4
Republican	James L. Cassella	20,394	23.2
Green Coalition	Nick Scardigno	602	0.7
Green Coalition	John Zazanis	497	0.6
Stop Vieques BOMBING	Rafael Sanchez	442	0.5
Total votes		87,863	100.0

New Jersey general election, 1999
Party	Candidate	Votes	%	±%
Republican	Paul DiGaetano	16,682	29.1	▲3.3
Republican	John V. Kelly	16,281	28.4	▲2.5
Democratic	Rocco Mazza	12,172	21.2	▼3.5
Democratic	Kenneth M. Sorkin	12,162	21.2	▼2.4
Total votes		57,297	100.0	

New Jersey general election, 1997
Party	Candidate	Votes	%	±%
Republican	John V. Kelly	24,140	25.9	▼1.0
Republican	Paul DiGaetano	24,037	25.8	▼1.9
Democratic	David Sivella	23,009	24.7	▲4.1
Democratic	Kenneth M. Sorkin	21,992	23.6	▲3.4
Total votes		93,178	100.0	

New Jersey general election, 1995
Party	Candidate	Votes	%	±%
Republican	Paul DiGaetano	16,337	27.7	▼2.7
Republican	John V. Kelly	15,854	26.9	▼4.1
Democratic	John W. Kelly	12,156	20.6	▲0.8
Democratic	Richard Potter	11,918	20.2	▲1.4
Conservative	Vincent J. Frantantoni	1,502	2.5	N/A
Conservative	Andrew M. Bloschak	1,150	2.0	N/A
Total votes		58,917	100.0	

New Jersey general election, 1993
Party	Candidate	Votes	%	±%
Republican	John V. Kelly	31,127	31.0	▲0.9
Republican	Paul DiGaetano	30,560	30.4	▲0.9
Democratic	Marina C. Perna	19,870	19.8	▼0.4
Democratic	Ozzie Maldonado	18,873	18.8	▼1.4
Total votes		100,430	100.0	

1991 New Jersey general election
Party	Candidate	Votes	%
Republican	John V. Kelly	24,356	30.1
Republican	Paul DiGaetano	23,819	29.5
Democratic	Alfred R. Restaino	16,366	20.2
Democratic	Louis J. Gill	16,310	20.2
Total votes		80,851	100.0

1989 New Jersey general election
Party	Candidate	Votes	%	±%
Democratic	Louis J. Gill	26,871	28.1	▲0.4
Democratic	Thomas J. Duch	26,853	28.1	▲1.0
Republican	Paul Di Gaetano	22,105	23.1	▼0.4
Republican	William Kogut	19,764	20.7	▼1.0
Total votes		95,593	100.0	

1987 New Jersey general election
Party	Candidate	Votes	%	±%
Democratic	Louis J. Gill	23,103	27.7	▲4.1
Democratic	Thomas J. Duch	22,667	27.1	▲5.2
Republican	Frank B. Calandriello	19,659	23.5	▼3.9
Republican	Andrew E. Bertone	18,085	21.7	▼5.5
Total votes		83,514	100.0	

1985 New Jersey general election
Party	Candidate	Votes	%	±%
Republican	Kathleen A. Donovan	24,775	27.4	▲7.4
Republican	Paul DiGaetano	24,555	27.2	▲7.5
Democratic	Robert P. Hollenbeck	21,295	23.6	▼7.5
Democratic	Richard F. Visotcky	19,764	21.9	▼7.2
Total votes		90,389	100.0	

New Jersey general election, 1983
Party	Candidate	Votes	%	±%
Democratic	Robert P. Hollenbeck	27,923	31.1	▲2.5
Democratic	Richard F. Visotcky	26,131	29.1	▲3.0
Republican	Richard DeLauro	17,990	20.0	▼2.9
Republican	Alfred L. Genton	17,682	19.7	▼2.7
Total votes		89,726	100.0	

New Jersey general election, 1981
Party	Candidate	Votes	%
Democratic	Robert P. Hollenbeck	30,047	28.6
Democratic	Richard F. Visotcky	27,375	26.1
Republican	James L. Plosia	24,055	22.9
Republican	Dante V. Mecca	23,490	22.4
Total votes		104,967	100.0

New Jersey general election, 1979
Party	Candidate	Votes	%	±%
Democratic	Robert P. Hollenbeck	24,394	28.0	▼2.0
Democratic	Richard F. Visotcky	22,496	25.8	▼1.0
Republican	Ronald W. Bogle	20,180	23.1	▲0.2
Republican	Bart Talamini	20,114	23.1	▲3.4
Total votes		87,184	100.0	

New Jersey general election, 1977
Party	Candidate	Votes	%	±%
Democratic	Robert P. Hollenbeck	28,639	30.0	▲2.9
Democratic	Richard F. Visotcky	25,562	26.8	▲0.8
Republican	Peter J. Russo	21,847	22.9	▲0.2
Republican	William P. Schuber	18,840	19.7	▼0.8
Libertarian	Robert Shapiro	527	0.6	N/A
Total votes		95,415	100.0	

New Jersey general election, 1975
Party	Candidate	Votes	%	±%
Democratic	Robert P. Hollenbeck	28,754	27.1	▼3.5
Democratic	Richard F. Visotcky	27,550	26.0	▼2.8
Republican	Peter J. Russo	24,117	22.7	▲2.2
Republican	Julius Capozzi	21,688	20.5	▲0.5
Tax Revolt Independent	Massimo Chierico	2,105	2.0	N/A
Tax Revolt Independent	Michael Carlucci	1,795	1.7	N/A
Total votes		106,009	100.0	

New Jersey general election, 1973
Party	Candidate	Votes	%
Democratic	Robert P. Hollenbeck	34,675	30.6
Democratic	Richard Visotcky	32,594	28.8
Republican	Peter J. Russo	23,221	20.5
Republican	James L. Plosia	22,669	20.0
Total votes		113,159	100.0
