= Kevin J. Ryan =

American politician (1969–2018)

Member of the New Jersey General Assembly from the 36th legislative district district
- In office January 6, 2011 – January 10, 2012 Serving with Gary Schaer
- Preceded by: Frederick Scalera
- Succeeded by: Marlene Caride

Personal details
- Born: May 6, 1969 Glen Ridge, New Jersey, U.S.
- Died: June 20, 2018 (aged 49)
- Party: Democratic

Kevin J. Ryan (May 6, 1969 – June 20, 2018) was a U.S. Democratic Party politician who served in the New Jersey General Assembly representing the 36th legislative district. Ryan was sworn in on January 6, 2011, to fill the remainder of the term of Frederick Scalera, who retired from the Assembly to accept a job in the private sector. He did not run in the 2011 election after redistricting moved his hometown of Nutley into the 28th District.

== Biography ==
Born in Glen Ridge, he graduated from Nutley High School and from the Essex County College Police Academy. He served 18 years in the Essex County Sheriff's Office, rising to the position of undersheriff in charge of field operations. He also served as an aide to former New Jersey Senate President Carmen A. Orechio.

On November 29, 2010, Frederick Scalera resigned from his Assembly seat for a job in the private sector. The Essex County Democratic Committee supported Ryan as Scalera's successor. He was sworn in on January 6, 2011.

In the 2011 legislative redistricting, portions of the 36th district, including Nutley, joined the new 28th district. When 28th district Assemblyman Ralph Caputo announced he would move to Nutley to continue representing the district, Ryan announced he would not seek re-election to make way for Caputo. He served in the Assembly until January 10, 2012, when he was succeeded in the 36th district by Marlene Caride.

Ryan died on June 20, 2018, at the age of 49.

New Jersey General Assembly
Preceded by Frederick Scalera	New Jersey State Assemblyman - District 36; January 6, 2011 - January 10, 2012	Succeeded by Marlene Caride
