= Kathleen Donovan =

American politician

Kathleen A. Donovan

4th County Executive of Bergen County
- In office January 1, 2011 – January 1, 2015
- Preceded by: Dennis McNerney
- Succeeded by: James J. Tedesco III

County Clerk of Bergen County
- In office January 1989 – January 2011
- Preceded by: Carl Hartmann
- Succeeded by: Elizabeth Randall

Chair of the New Jersey Republican Party
- In office June 1989 – February 1990
- Preceded by: Bob Franks
- Succeeded by: Bob Franks

Member of the New Jersey General Assembly from the 36th district
- In office January 3, 1986 – January 3, 1988 Serving with Paul DiGaetano
- Preceded by: Robert P. Hollenbeck; Richard F. Visotcky
- Succeeded by: Thomas J. Duch; Louis J. Gill

Personal details
- Born: 1952 (age 73–74) Queens, New York, U.S.
- Party: Republican
- Education: Queen of Peace High School
- Alma mater: Rutgers University–Newark (BA); Cleveland State University College of Law (JD)
- Website: www.co.bergen.nj.us

Kathleen A. Donovan (born 1952) is an American politician who from 2011 to 2015 served as County Executive of Bergen County, New Jersey, and is currently the last Republican to hold that office. She was previously the Bergen County Clerk from 1989 to 2011, and served in the New Jersey General Assembly from 1986 to 1988.

== Early life and education ==
Donovan, a graduate of Queen of Peace High School, earned a Bachelor of Arts in Political Science from Rutgers University-Newark and was awarded a Juris Doctor from the Cleveland State University College of Law. She is a resident of Rutherford, New Jersey.

== Public service ==
Donovan was a part-time public defender of Lyndhurst, New Jersey (her hometown), from 1983 to 1988. From 1986 to 1988, she represented the 36th Legislative District in the New Jersey General Assembly. In the Assembly, Donovan served on the State Regulatory Efficiency Committee (as Vice-Chair) and as a member of the Environmental Quality Committee. She served as chairman of the New Jersey Republican State Committee from June 1989 to February 1990, before being replaced by her predecessor, Union County Assemblyman Bob Franks.

She was first elected County Clerk in 1988 and was reelected in 1993, 1998, 2003 and 2008. As County Clerk, Donovan was in charge of maintaining land use records in the county, including deeds and mortgages, preserving county records, handling certain election functions including counting ballots, receiving petitions, handling absentee ballots and designing ballots, serving as the local passport office for Bergen County and handling other services including identification cards for veterans. As County Clerk she also functioned as a Recorder of Deeds for Bergen County.

In 1994 Donovan was appointed by Gov. Christine Todd Whitman as a member of the Board of Commissioners of the Port Authority of New York and New Jersey with the designation of Chairwoman of the Port Authority. As Port Authority Chairwoman, Donovan was a part-time official overseeing a bi-state agency governing all of the New York area ports, including LaGuardia Airport, Newark Liberty International Airport and John F. Kennedy International Airport, along with the World Trade Center and the PATH mass transit system between New York and New Jersey. Donovan stepped down as Port Authority Chairwoman in December 1995 in order to unsuccessfully run for Congress in the 1996 election, but she retained her seat on the agency's Board of Commissioners. Donovan remained a Port Authority Commissioner until 2002 when she was replaced by Gov. James McGreevey when her term expired. She was a commissioner when the September 11 terrorist attacks destroyed the World Trade Center. Seats on the Port Authority Board are considered one of the top political appointments that can be awarded by the Governor of New Jersey or the Governor of New York.

== Bergen County Executive ==
Donovan unsuccessfully sought support to run for Bergen County Executive in the 2002 Republican primary, and lost a campaign for the 2006 Republican nomination for that office.

Donovan ran again for County Executive in 2010, where she advanced to the general election, defeated incumbent Democrat Dennis McNerney, and swept into office with her three Freeholder running mates, in an election in which perceived corruption by the Democratic incumbents, and rising spending and taxes were the major issues. Donovan won with 52.9% of the vote (117,104), while McNerney received 47.1% (104,366).

In 2014, Donovan lost re-election to Democratic Freeholder James J. Tedesco III, in an election in which the major issues were the county budget, consolidation of the county police and sheriff, and issues regarding lawsuits filed between the different branches of government. Election results showed her garnering 45.8% (91,299) of the vote compared to Tedesco's 54.16% (107,958).

Donovan and two of her 2014 campaign aids were later fined $2500 total for six violations of New Jersey election law.

New Jersey General Assembly
Preceded by Robert P. Hollenbeck; Richard F. Visotcky	Member of the New Jersey General Assembly for the 36th District; 1986 – 1988; With: Paul DiGaetano	Succeeded by Thomas J. Duch; Louis J. Gill
Party political offices
Preceded by Bob Franks	Chair of the New Jersey Republican Party; 1989 – 1990	Succeeded by Bob Franks
Political offices
Preceded by Richard Leone	Chair of the Port Authority of New York and New Jersey; 1994 – 1995	Succeeded by Lewis Eisenberg
Preceded by Dennis McNerney	County Executive of Bergen County, New Jersey; 2011 – 2015	Succeeded by James J. Tedesco III
