= Anthony Scardino =

American politician

Anthony Scardino Jr.

Member of the New Jersey Senate from the 36th district
- In office January 8, 1974 – December 31, 1980
- Preceded by: District created
- Succeeded by: Joseph Hirkala

Personal details
- Born: August 24, 1936 (age 90) Hoboken, New Jersey
- Party: Democratic
- Spouse: Madelyn Giammetta
- Children: 5

Anthony Scardino Jr. (born August 24, 1936) is an American Democratic Party politician and government official from New Jersey. He served in the New Jersey Senate from the 36th district from 1974 to 1981 and had served as Mayor of Lyndhurst, New Jersey.

Born in Hoboken in 1936, he attended public schools in Lyndhurst and served in the United States Air Force. He served on the Lyndhurst Board of Education from 1963 to 1972 and was Mayor of Lyndhurst at the time of his election to the Senate.

He was an unsuccessful candidate to the New Jersey General Assembly in 1971 running in District 13-A. However, two years later he was elected to the State Senate from the new 36th District encompassing southern Bergen County. He was reelected in 1977. During his second term in the Senate, he resigned to take a position on the Hackensack Meadowlands Development Commission, later known as the New Jersey Meadowlands Commission. He served as the agency's executive director for 18 years. In 2005 Governor Richard Codey appointed him Commissioner to New Jersey Sports and Exposition Authority (NJSEA) where he served till January 2025. Scardino also serves on the Felician University Board of Trustees and the board of the Hackensack Meridian Health system and Meadowlands Chamber of Commerce.

In April 2025 The Anthony Scardino Jr Overlook Trail was named after him by the NJSEA in De Korte State Park in Lyndhurst, NJ.

He is married to the former Madelyn Giammetta and has five children, 12 grandchildren and two greatgrandchildren.
