= Gary Schaer =

Member of the New Jersey General Assembly

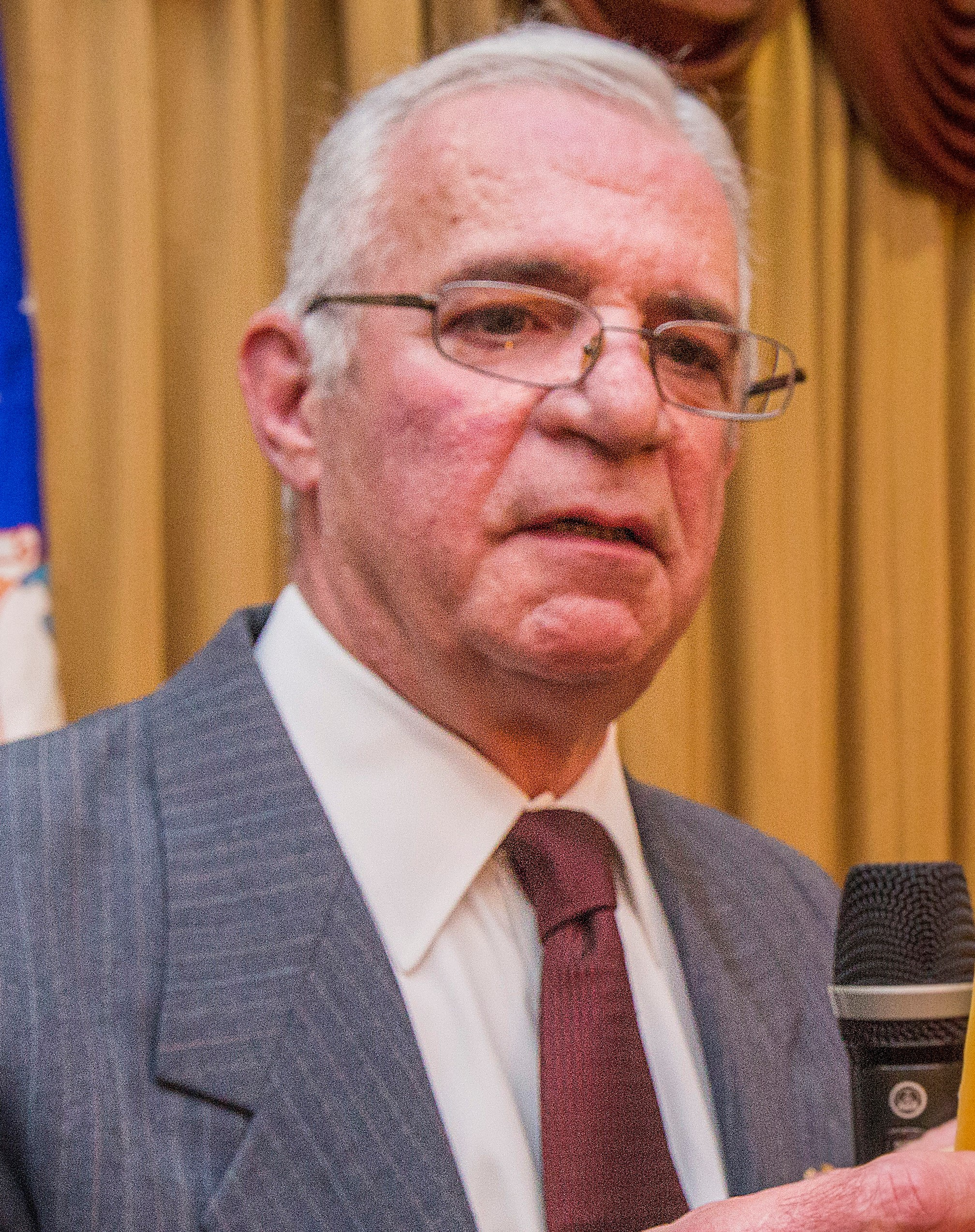
- Schaer in 2017

Member of the New Jersey General Assembly from the 36th district
- Incumbent
- Assumed office January 10, 2006 Serving with: Frederick Scalera (2006–2010); Kevin J. Ryan (2011–2012); Marlene Caride (2012–2018); Clinton Calabrese (2018-present)
- Preceded by: Paul DiGaetano

Acting Mayor of Passaic, New Jersey
- In office May 9, 2008 – November 2008
- Preceded by: Samuel Rivera
- Succeeded by: Alex Blanco

Member of Passaic City Council
- Incumbent
- Assumed office May 1995

Personal details
- Born: September 11, 1951 (age 75)
- Party: Democratic
- Spouse: Donna
- Children: 3
- Education: American University (BA)
- Website: Legislative web page

Gary Steven Schaer (born September 11, 1951) is an American Democratic Party politician who represents the 36th Legislative District in the New Jersey General Assembly since he took office on January 10, 2006. He also serves on the Passaic, New Jersey City Council where he is the council president. Schaer is the first Orthodox Jew in the New Jersey Legislature. In the Assembly, Schaer was Deputy Speaker from 2012 to 2023 and chair of the Budget Committee from 2014 to 2017, and has been the Assembly's Policy Chair since 2020.

== Biography ==
Schaer grew up in Pennsauken Township, New Jersey. He attended American University, majoring in political science.

Schaer has served on the Passaic City Council since 1995, including being the council president off-and-on since 1997. He has been a Director of Passaic's Urban Enterprise Zone since 2002. He served as a Commissioner on the Board of Education for the Passaic County Technical Institute from 1999 to 2003 and was a commissioner on the Passaic Housing Authority from 1992 to 1996. In March 2023, Schaer was hired as the executive director of the Passaic County Improvement Authority.

Schaer unsuccessfully ran for Mayor of Passaic in 1997 finishing behind incumbent Margie Semler and councilman Samuel Rivera. In May 2008, Schaer became the acting mayor of Passaic upon the resignation of Rivera, who had won election to the office in 2001, as a result of Rivera pleading guilty on corruption charges. Though he considered running for the remainder of the term, Schaer declined to seek election to the unexpired term and was succeeded by Alex Blanco.

He is a Trustee of St. Mary's Hospital. Schaer has worked in the financial services industry for over 20 years. He is an investment consultant and vice president at Ryan Beck & Company. A resident of Passaic, he is married to Donna and has three children.

== Legislative career ==
Schaer was elected to the Assembly on November 8, 2005, and took the seat of Republican Paul DiGaetano, who did not run for re-election and had held the seat in the Assembly continuously since 1992. Schaer represents the 36th District, a district consisting of only the City of Passaic in Passaic County in the 2001 and 2011 apportionments and Bergen County (Nutley in Essex County was a part of the district in the 2001 apportionment); his predecessor DiGaetano has also been a resident of Passaic. District leaders attempt to provide geographic balance when picking candidates.

Schaer is the first Orthodox Jew to serve in the New Jersey Legislature. In situations in which the legislature is in session on Saturday, the Jewish Sabbath, when the dictates of his Orthodox Jewish faith prohibit him from participating in forbidden forms of work, he has appointed an aide to formally cast a ballot on his behalf, a policy permitted by the Assembly's rules, as long as the legislator is in the building.

He held the Deputy Speaker position in the Assembly from 2012 to 2023 and was Chair of the Budget Committee from 2014 to 2017. He has been the Assembly's Policy Chair since 2020.

=== Committees ===
Committee assignments for the 2024—2025 Legislative Session are:

- Financial Institutions and Insurance (as vice-chair)
- Appropriations
- Budget

=== District 36 ===
Each of the 40 districts in the New Jersey Legislature has one representative in the New Jersey Senate and two members in the New Jersey General Assembly. The representatives from the 36th District for the 2024—2025 Legislative Session are:

- Senator Paul Sarlo (D)
- Assemblyman Clinton Calabrese (D)
- Assemblyman Gary Schaer (D)

== Electoral history ==
36th Legislative District General Election, 2023
Party	Candidate	Votes	%
Democratic	Clinton Calabrese (incumbent)	18,228	30.6
Democratic	Gary S. Schaer (incumbent)	18,072	30.3
Republican	Craig Auriemma	11,761	19.7
Republican	Joseph Viso Jr.	11,546	19.4
Total votes		59,607	100.0
Democratic hold			
Democratic hold			

36th legislative district general election, 2021
Party	Candidate	Votes	%
Democratic	Gary S. Schaer (incumbent)	24,654	28.40%
Democratic	Clinton Calabrese (incumbent)	24,137	27.80%
Republican	Joseph Viso Jr.	19,025	21.91%
Republican	Craig Auriemma	19,008	21.89%
Total votes		86,824	100.0
Democratic hold			

36th Legislative District General Election, 2019
Party	Candidate	Votes	%
Democratic	Gary Schaer (incumbent)	14,990	30.86%
Democratic	Clinton Calabrese (incumbent)	14,901	30.68%
Republican	Foster Lowe	9,350	19.25%
Republican	Khaldoun Androwis	9,336	19.22%
Total votes		47,346	100%
Democratic hold			

New Jersey General Assembly
Preceded by Paul DiGaetano	Member of the New Jersey General Assembly for the 36th District; January 10, 2006 – present With: Frederick Scalera, Kevin J. Ryan, Marlene Caride	Succeeded by Incumbent
Political offices
Preceded by Samuel Rivera	Acting Mayor of Passaic, New Jersey; May 5, 2008 – November 2008	Succeeded by Alex Blanco
