= Frederick Scalera =

American politician (born 1958)

Member of the New Jersey General Assembly from the 36th district
- In office May 22, 2003 – November 29, 2010 Serving with Gary Schaer
- Preceded by: Paul Sarlo
- Succeeded by: Kevin J. Ryan

Personal details
- Born: May 27, 1958 (age 68) Passaic, New Jersey, U.S.
- Party: Democratic

Frederick Scalera (born May 27, 1958) is an American Democratic Party politician who served in the New Jersey General Assembly from 2003 to 2011, representing the 36th Legislative District. Scalera resides in Nutley, New Jersey and has served as a member of the Board of Education of the Nutley Public Schools.

== Biography ==
Scalera graduated from Nutley High School and Essex County College (Fire Code Technology). Scalera received an Honorary Doctorate in Humanities from Essex County College. He is the Retired Deputy Fire Chief in Nutley.

In the Assembly, Scalera served on the Homeland Security and State Preparedness Committee (as Chair), Housing and Local Government Committee and the Labor Committee. Scalera has served on the Governor's Task Force on Community Emergency Response, Citizen Corps since 2003 and on the Essex County Local Emergency Planning Council since 1991.

Scalera resigned suddenly in January 2011, and was replaced by Essex County Democrats by Kevin J. Ryan, a Nutley native. Later that year, Scalera ran for a three-year term on the Nutley Board of Education and was elected. He was seeking election to the Nutley Board of Commissioners in 2012, which is the town's chief legislative body, but did not receive enough votes to be elected.

In 2014, he received a job with New Jersey Homeland Security out of the Newark office. He left his job with New Jersey Homeland Security in September 2016 for a position in the private sector.

Political offices
Preceded by Paul Sarlo	New Jersey State Assemblyman - District 36; 2003 - 2011	Succeeded by Kevin J. Ryan
