= Garry Furnari =

American politician (born 1954)

Garry J. Furnari

Member of the New Jersey Senate from the 36th district
- In office 1998–2003
- Preceded by: John P. Scott
- Succeeded by: Paul Sarlo

Mayor of Nutley, New Jersey
- In office 1996–2003

Nutley Township Municipal Prosecutor
- In office 1986–1988
- In office 1992–1995

Personal details
- Born: Garry Joseph Furnari; September 1, 1954 (age 71)
- Party: Democratic
- Education: Rutgers University (BA); Pace University (JD)

Garry J. Furnari (born September 1, 1954) is a judge and former American Democratic Party politician, who served in the New Jersey State Senate from 1998 to 2003, where he represented the 36th Legislative District.

== Biography ==
Furnari was elected to the State Senate in November 1997, when he defeated Republican incumbent John P. Scott. Furnari won with 55% of the vote, taking the seat of one of the Senate's most conservative members.

In 2001, Furnari was challenged by Republican Party Assemblyman John V. Kelly. The seat was considered one of the few statewide that could have been a pickup for the Republicans. Furnari went on to win by a 52–48% margin.

Furnari left the Senate in May 2003 after being nominated to serve on New Jersey Superior Court, and was succeeded by Paul Sarlo. Sarlo had been the choice of Bergen County Democratic Organization Chairman Joe Ferriero to succeed Furnari.

In the Senate, Furnari served on the State Government Committee (as Co-Chair), the Commerce Committee, the Judiciary Committee and the Law and Public Safety and Veterans' Affairs Committee.

Furnari served as a Commissioner and Mayor of Nutley, New Jersey from 1996 to 2003, was Nutley Township Attorney from 1995 to 1996, and was Nutley Township Municipal Prosecutor from 1986 to 1988, and again from 1992 to 1995.

Furnari attended Nutley High School, graduating in 1972. He received a B.A. from Rutgers University with a major in Political Science in 1976 and was awarded a J.D. from Pace University School of Law in 1980.

Political offices
Preceded by John P. Scott	Senator- 36th Legislative District; 1998 - 2003	Succeeded by Paul Sarlo
