= Marlene Caride =

American Democratic Party politician

Commissioner of the New Jersey Department of Banking and Insurance
- Incumbent
- Assumed office January 16, 2018
- Governor: Phil Murphy
- Preceded by: Richard J. Badolato

Member of the New Jersey General Assembly from the 36th district
- In office January 10, 2012 – January 16, 2018
- Preceded by: Kevin J. Ryan
- Succeeded by: Clinton Calabrese

Personal details
- Born: August 14, 1963 (age 63) Weehawken, New Jersey, U.S.
- Party: Democratic
- Education: Fairleigh Dickinson University (BA); California Western School of Law (JD)

Marlene Caride (born August 14, 1963) is an American politician who served in the New Jersey General Assembly from 2012 to 2018, where she represented the 36th Legislative District. Caride resigned from the Assembly in January 2018 pending her confirmation by the New Jersey Senate to serve as head of the New Jersey Department of Banking and Insurance.

== Early life and education ==
Caride was born in Weehawken to Cuban immigrant parents on August 14, 1963. She earned a bachelor's degree in Education from Fairleigh Dickinson University and a Juris Doctor from the California Western School of Law.

== Career ==
Caride is an attorney who is a partner in private practice with the firm of Gonzalez & Caride. She has served as prosecutor for the Board of Alcoholic Beverage Control of West New York from 2009 to 2012, as an attorney of the town's parking authority from 1995 to 2009, and has been the municipal prosecutor of the Borough of Ridgefield since 2011. In her hometown of Ridgefield, she was a library alternate trustee from 2005 to 2006 and was an alternate member of the board of health from 2005 to 2007.

Caride served in the Assembly on the Commerce and Economic Development Committee (as Vice-Chair), the Financial Institutions and Insurance Committee, the Transportation and Independent Authorities Committee, the New Jersey Legislative Select Committee on Investigation (investigating the Fort Lee lane closure scandal), and the Intergovernmental Relations Commission.

=== State Department of Banking and Insurance ===
In January 2018, she was nominated by incoming governor Phil Murphy to head the New Jersey Department of Banking and Insurance, a cabinet-level position. Confirmed on June 27, 2018, Caride is the first Hispanic commissioner to fill the position.

New Jersey General Assembly
Preceded by Kevin J. Ryan	Member of the New Jersey General Assembly for the 36th District; January 10, 2012 – January 16, 2018; With: Gary Schaer	Succeeded by Clinton Calabrese
