= Clinton Calabrese =

Member of the New Jersey General Assembly

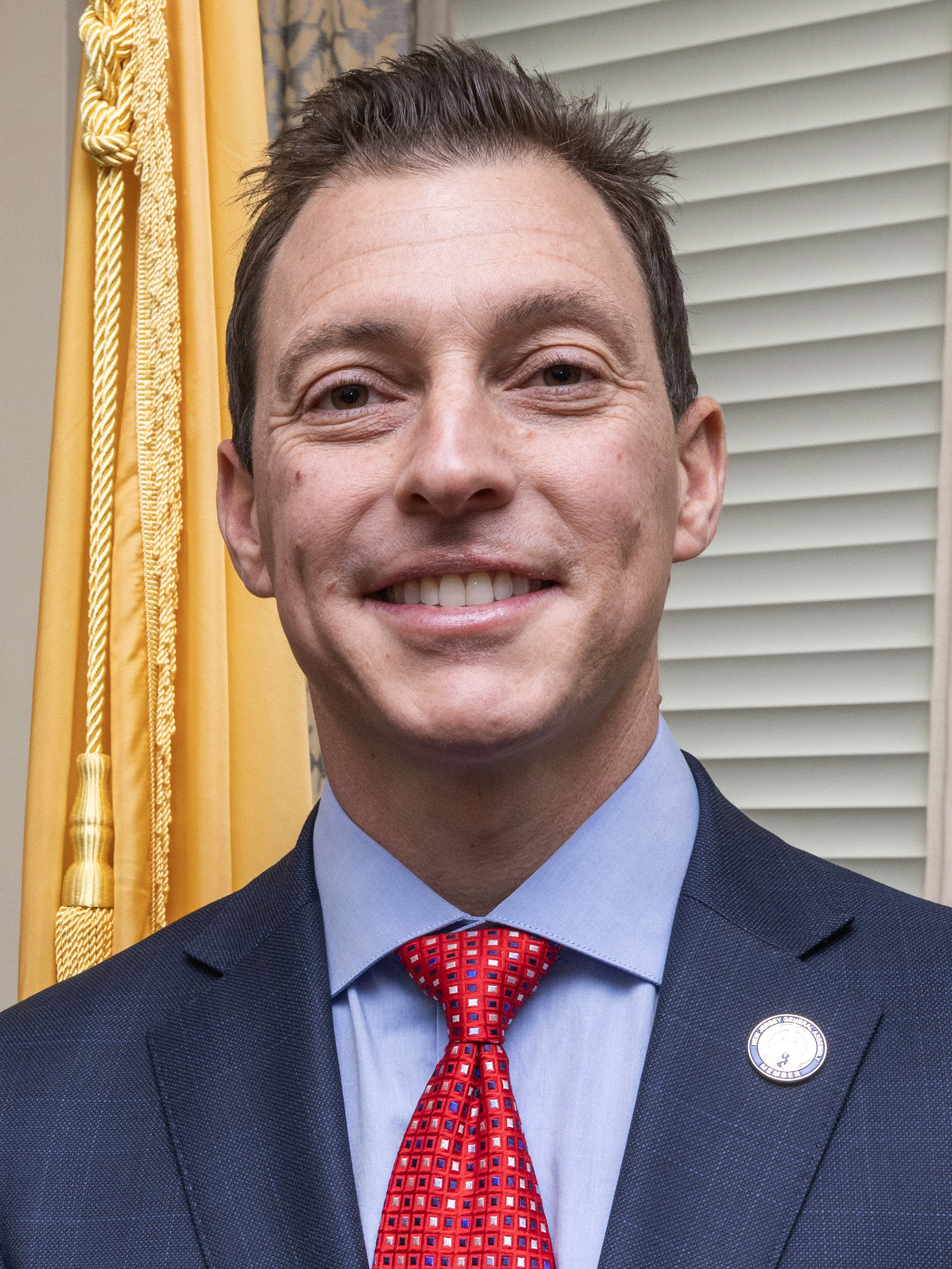
- Calabrese in 2026

Member of the New Jersey General Assembly from the 36th district
- Incumbent
- Assumed office February 8, 2018 Serving with Gary Schaer
- Preceded by: Marlene Caride

Personal details
- Born: March 4, 1986 (age 40)
- Party: Democratic
- Education: Saint Joseph's University and New York University
- Occupation: Principal, Alkova Companies
- Website: Legislative web page

Clinton Calabrese (born March 4, 1986) is an American Democratic Party politician who has represented the 36th Legislative District in the New Jersey General Assembly since February 10, 2018, when he was sworn in to replace Marlene Caride, who resigned from office after being nominated to serve as head of the New Jersey Department of Banking and Insurance. Calabrese had served on the Board of Education of the Cliffside Park School District. He has been the Assembly's Deputy Whip since 2022.

== Background ==
A resident of Cliffside Park, Calabrese graduated from Don Bosco Preparatory High School in 2004, attended Saint Joseph's University in Philadelphia where he earned a bachelor's degree in business administration, and New York University, where he received a master's degree in real estate finance. Calabrese had been an analyst for Deutsche Bank and works as a principal for Alkova Companies, a real estate investment firm. Calabrese is the son of Gerald Calabrese Jr., the chairman of the Cliffside Park Democratic Party, and the grandson of Gerald Calabrese, a former professional basketball player who served for 50 years as mayor of Cliffside Park.

== New Jersey Assembly ==
In December 2017, Marlene Caride was nominated by incoming governor Phil Murphy to head the New Jersey Department of Banking and Insurance, a cabinet-level position, and resigned from office in January 2018. After being chosen by Democratic county committee members from Bergen County and Passaic County to fill the vacancy, Calabrese was sworn in to office on February 8, 2018, to succeed Caride. When he first took office at 31-years-old, Calabrese was the youngest serving member in the General Assembly.

=== Committees ===
Committee assignments for the 2024—2025 Legislative Session are:

- Transportation and Independent Authorities (as chair)
- Tourism, Gaming and the Arts (as vice-chair)

=== District 36 ===
Each of the 40 districts in the New Jersey Legislature has one representative in the New Jersey Senate and two members in the New Jersey General Assembly. The representatives from the 36th District for the 2024—2025 Legislative Session are:

- Senator Paul Sarlo (D)
- Assemblyman Clinton Calabrese (D)
- Assemblyman Gary Schaer (D)

=== Legislation ===
In the 2018–2019 legislative session, Calabrese was primary sponsor on the following bills signed into law:

- A-4031 Requires display of identifying information on rear of school bus so public may report bus driver misconduct.
- A-4229 Applies Meadowlands regional hotel use assessment to all municipalities that participate in Meadowlands tax sharing program.
- A-4707 Directs Department of Agriculture to establish public awareness campaign for food waste.

== Electoral history ==
36th Legislative District General Election, 2023
Party	Candidate	Votes	%
Democratic	Clinton Calabrese (incumbent)	18,228	30.6
Democratic	Gary S. Schaer (incumbent)	18,072	30.3
Republican	Craig Auriemma	11,761	19.7
Republican	Joseph Viso Jr.	11,546	19.4
Total votes		59,607	100.0
Democratic hold			
Democratic hold			

36th legislative district general election, 2021
Party	Candidate	Votes	%
Democratic	Gary S. Schaer (incumbent)	24,654	28.40%
Democratic	Clinton Calabrese (incumbent)	24,137	27.80%
Republican	Joseph Viso Jr.	19,025	21.91%
Republican	Craig Auriemma	19,008	21.89%
Total votes		86,824	100.0
Democratic hold			

36th Legislative District General Election, 2019
Party	Candidate	Votes	%
Democratic	Gary Schaer (incumbent)	14,990	30.86%
Democratic	Clinton Calabrese (incumbent)	14,901	30.68%
Republican	Foster Lowe	9,350	19.25%
Republican	Khaldoun Androwis	9,336	19.22%
Total votes		47,346	100%
Democratic hold			

36th Legislative District Special Election, 2018
Party	Candidate	Votes	%
Democratic	Clinton Calabrese (incumbent)	36,914	63.8%
Republican	Marc Marsi	20,946	36.2%
Total votes		57,860	100%
Democratic hold			

New Jersey General Assembly
Preceded by Marlene Caride	Member of the New Jersey General Assembly for the 36th District; February 8, 2018–present With: Gary Schaer	Succeeded by Incumbent
