= Samuel Rivera =

American mayor (1946–2020)

Mayor of Passaic, New Jersey
- In office July 1, 2001 – May 9, 2008
- Preceded by: Marge Semler
- Succeeded by: Gary Schaer

Personal details
- Born: 1946 Cayey, Puerto Rico
- Died: May 1, 2020 (aged 73–74) Pennsylvania
- Party: Democratic

Samuel Rivera (1946 – May 1, 2020) was an American politician, the Democratic mayor of the U.S. city of Passaic, New Jersey, from 2001 until 2008. Rivera came to national attention on September 6, 2007, when he was indicted and arrested on charges of accepting bribes in exchange for agreeing to direct municipal contracts to an insurance broker acting as a cooperating witness. Rivera pleaded guilty to attempted extortion, stepped down as mayor, and was sentenced to 21 months in prison. He was succeeded in office by Gary Schaer.

== Early life ==
Rivera began his career by joining the Passaic Police Department in 1968. In 1970, Rivera was brought up on police brutality charges. He avoided trial by resigning and returning to Puerto Rico, where he became a police officer as well with the Puerto Rico Police Department. There, his law enforcement career ended when he was convicted of a felony and sentenced to either two or three years probation for offenses including admittedly slashing himself to simulate having been attacked in order to protect his partner, who killed a narcotics suspect. Rivera returned to Passaic in 1981 and became a private investigator.

== Political career ==
Rivera ran for Passaic City Council in 1993 and 1995, losing both times. Later in 1995 he won a special election to the Council by 11 votes. He then ran a losing campaign for mayor in 1997, and then again in 2001, winning the race. New Jersey Governor Donald DiFrancesco attempted to prevent Rivera from taking office due to his status as a Puerto Rican felon, but Superior Court judge Robert Passero allowed Rivera to be sworn in, finding that the state had failed to prove that Rivera's crime was a crime of "moral turpitude".

Rivera was a member of Mayors Against Illegal Guns Coalition and, when he served as mayor, was a member of Hillary Clinton's Mayors Council and National Hispanic Leadership Council. During the course of his tenure as mayor, Rivera had the City Council nearly triple his salary from $40,000 to $117,000.

== Indictment and felony conviction ==
On September 6, 2007, the FBI arrested 11 public officials and one civilian after a year-and-a-half long corruption investigation yielded grand jury indictments, against Rivera and other elected officials, including Assembly members Mims Hackett and Alfred E. Steele. Rivera was indicted for demanding and accepting money from John D'Angelo, an insurance broker acting as a cooperating witness for the FBI. D'Angelo pretended to be trying to get insurance coverage contracts from the City of Passaic. The indictment alleges that Rivera accepted a $5,000 bribe to steer insurance business with the City of Passaic and with the Passaic Valley Water Commission, bragging that "I can get four votes easy, easy, easy," to a witness about his ability to obtain approval from the Passaic City Council.

After appearing in front of a magistrate in Trenton and posting bail, Rivera resumed his duties the following day, Friday, September 7. State law permits elected officials to retain their offices even after they are convicted and sentenced; they can only be removed if they are formally impeached. Rivera had stated that he did not intend to resign. Nevertheless, he pleaded guilty to attempted extortion and resigned on May 9, 2008. In 2008, Rivera was sentenced to 21 months in prison.

After serving 16 months at a Federal prison in Ohio, Rivera was transferred to a halfway house in New York, to serve the remainder of his 21-month felony sentence.

== Personal ==
Rivera was born on a tobacco farm into a family of 14 children, where he lived until he moved to Passaic in 1963. Shortly thereafter, at age 17, he dropped out of 11th grade and married for the first time. Rivera suffered five strokes and married four times.

== Death ==
He died on May 1, 2020 at a nursing home in Pennsylvania the age of 73.

== Sources ==
- The criminal complaint against Rivera, United States Department of Justice, September 5, 2007.

== See also ==
- List of Puerto Ricans

Political offices
Preceded by Marge Semler	Mayor of Passaic, New Jersey; 2001–2008	Succeeded by Gary Schaer
