= Paul DiGaetano =

American politician (born 1953)

Minority Leader of the New Jersey General Assembly
- In office January 8, 2002 – January 13, 2004
- Preceded by: Joseph J. Roberts
- Succeeded by: Alex DeCroce

Majority Leader of the New Jersey General Assembly
- In office January 9, 1996 – January 8, 2002
- Preceded by: Jack Collins
- Succeeded by: Joseph J. Roberts

Member of the New Jersey General Assembly from the 36th district
- In office January 14, 1992 – January 10, 2006
- Preceded by: Thomas J. Duch
- Succeeded by: Gary Schaer
- In office January 14, 1986 – January 12, 1988
- Preceded by: Richard F. Visotcky
- Succeeded by: Thomas J. Duch

Personal details
- Born: October 28, 1953 (age 73)
- Party: Republican
- Education: University of Notre Dame (BS)

Paul DiGaetano (born October 28, 1953) is the current Bergen County Republican Organization Chairman. DiGaetano also served in the New Jersey General Assembly representing the 36th Legislative District from 1986 – 1987 and again from 1992 – 2006. DiGaetano also served as a member of the Vietnam Veterans Memorial Commission, the Legislative Service Commission and the New Jersey Commission on Science and Technology. DiGaetano originally represented Passaic, New Jersey, but moved to Nutley, New Jersey following his 1999 re-election (DiGaetano believed that, when the new legislative districts would be redrawn following the 2000 U.S. Census, Passaic would be split from District 36 and he wanted to ensure that he would keep his seat if it came to that). He served with John Kelly of Nutley for many years in the Assembly, but for his last two terms in office he served as part of a split ticket; Wood-Ridge, New Jersey mayor Paul Sarlo was elected to Kelly's seat in 2001 and after Sarlo moved to the State Senate Frederick Scalera of Nutley was elected in 2003 to replace him.

In 2005, DiGaetano did not run for re-election in the split 36th District, choosing instead to run for the Republican nomination for governor. DiGaetano came in a distant sixth in the primary election with 16,684 votes, well behind winner Doug Forrester who received 108,941. On Election Day, November 8, 2005, Democrat Frederick Scalera, who joined the Assembly in 2003, retained his seat and running mate Gary Schaer was victorious, picking up DiGaetano's open seat for the Democrats.

DiGaetano received a B.S. degree from the University of Notre Dame in Aerospace Engineering. He is President of J. DiGaetano and Sons Inc., a construction and development company.

== New Jersey Assembly ==
During his legislative career, DiGaetano pushed many measures that served the public’s interest, such as the HMO right-to-sue legislation, mandatory health insurance coverage for women’s cervical cancer tests, lightening the tax burden on New Jersey’s working poor and cutting taxes more than fifty times. DiGaetano worked on legislation to create Urban Enterprise Zones, protect children from sexual predators, toughen rape penalties, reform binding arbitration, create New Jersey’s first ever cord blood resource center, secure funding to purchase enhanced testing equipment for newborn infants. As Assemblyman, he sponsored the Senior Gold Prescription Discount Program, authored the Anti-Terrorism Act of 2001, sponsored the creation of a conservation trust fund to protect the New Jersey Meadowlands and Watershed, and authored the Brownfields Redevelopment Act.

Paul DiGaetano was a member of the Passaic City Council from 1981 – 1996, serving as its President from 1991 – 1993. He was the Assembly's Republican Leader from 2002 – 2003 and the Majority Leader from 1996 – 2001.

== Bergen County GOP ==
In 2016 DiGaetano challenged incumbent Bergen County Republican Organization chairman Robert Yudin in the race for chair. DiGaetano cited recent Republican losses in county elections and popular Bergen County Sheriff Michael Saudino switching affiliation to the Bergen Democrats as major reasons for new leadership being necessary. DiGaetano also had support from the local Young Republicans chapter, with Paul offering to make several members leaders in his administration. DiGaetano won with a near landslide victory in June 2016.

== 2017 Senate Campaign ==
In February 2017 DiGaetano declared his candidacy for New Jersey Senate in the New Jersey's 40th legislative district after incumbent Senator Kevin J. O'Toole announced that he will not seek reelection. At its March 2017 convention, Bergen County Republicans selected DiGaetano as its nominee for Senate, with former District 34 Senator Norm Robertson and Christopher Phillips as nominees for General Assembly. DiGaetano's main opponent for the nomination is Kristin Corrado, the current Passaic County Clerk who is expected to receive backing from the county committee there.

DiGaetano confirmed that should he be elected he will remain as the Bergen County Republican Chairman.

== District 36 ==
Each of the forty districts in the New Jersey Legislature has one representative in the New Jersey Senate and two members in the New Jersey General Assembly. The other representatives from the 36th Legislative District for the 2004–2006 legislative session were:

- Assemblyman Frederick Scalera, and
- Senator Paul Sarlo
