= Passaic, New Jersey =

City in Passaic County, New Jersey, US

- City
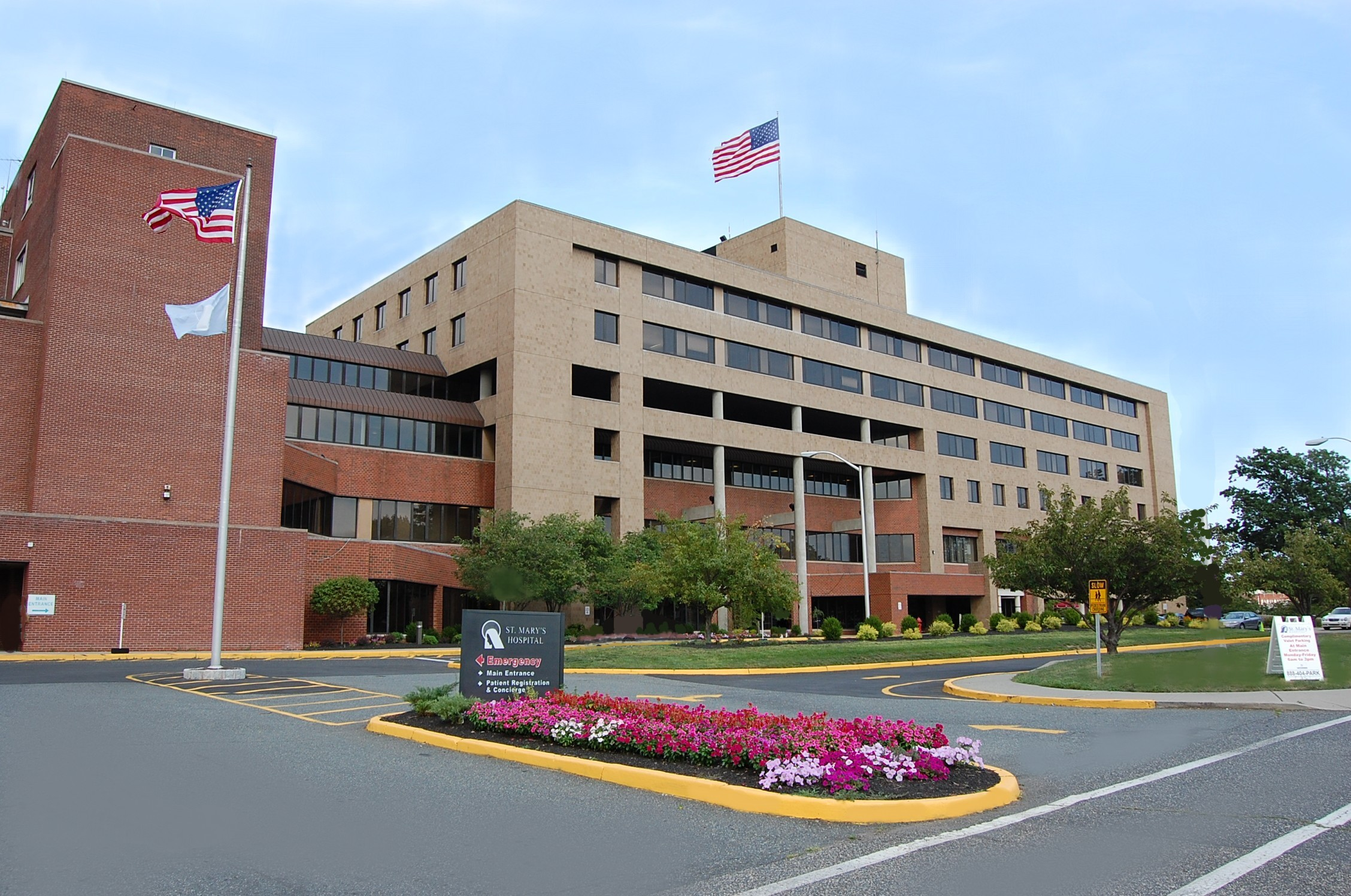
- St. Mary's General Hospital in Passaic, New Jersey

- Seal

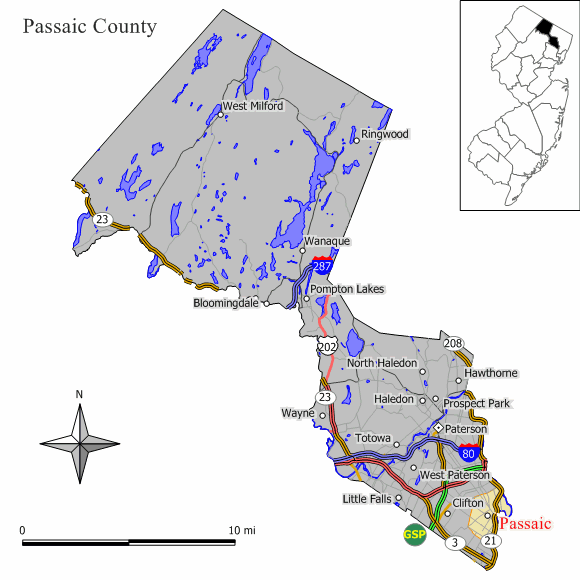
- Location of Passaic in Passaic County highlighted in yellow (left). Inset map: Location of Passaic County in New Jersey highlighted in black (right).

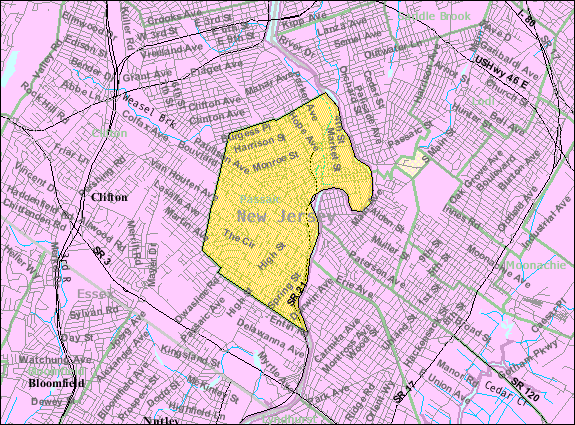
- Census Bureau map of Passaic, New Jersey

- Location in Passaic County Location in New Jersey Location in the United States
- Coordinates: 40.857552°N 74.129089°W
- Country: United States
- State: New Jersey
- County: Passaic
- Settled: 1679
- Incorporated: April 2, 1873

Government
  - Type: Faulkner Act (mayor-council)
  - Body: City Council
  - Mayor: Hector C. Lora (term ends June 30, 2029)
  - Administrator: Rick Fernandez
  - Municipal clerk: Weatherly Frias

Area
  - Total: 3.24 sq mi (8.39 km^{2})
  - Land: 3.13 sq mi (8.11 km^{2})
  - Water: 0.11 sq mi (0.28 km^{2}) 3.33%
  - Rank: 326th of 565 in state 11th of 16 in county
- Elevation: 98 ft (30 m)

Population (2020)
  - Total: 70,537
  - Estimate (2023): 68,903
  - Rank: 552nd in country (as of 2023); 16th of 565 in state 3rd of 16 in county
  - Density: 22,514.2/sq mi (8,692.8/km^{2})
  - Rank: 7th of 565 in state 1st of 16 in county
- Time zone: UTC−05:00 (Eastern (EST))
  - Summer (DST): UTC−04:00 (Eastern (EDT))
- ZIP Code: 07055
- Area code: 973
- FIPS code: 3403156550
- GNIS feature ID: 0885342
- Website: cityofpassaic.com

Passaic (/pəˈseɪ.ɪk/ pə-SAY-ik or locally /pəˈseɪk/ pə-SAYK) is a city in Passaic County, in the U.S. state of New Jersey. As of the 2020 United States census, the city was the state's 16th-most-populous municipality, with a population of 70,537, falling behind Bayonne (ranked 16th in 2010), an increase of 756 (+1.1%) from the 2010 census count of 69,781, which in turn reflected an increase of 1,920 residents (+2.8%) from the 2000 census population of 67,861. The Census Bureau's Population Estimates Program calculated a population of 68,903 for 2023, making it the 552nd-most populous municipality in the nation. Among cities with more than 50,000 people, Passaic was the fifth-most densely populated municipality in the United States, with more than 22,000 people per square mile.

Located north of Newark on the Passaic River, it was first settled in 1678 by Dutch traders, as Acquackanonk Township. The city and river get their name from the Lenape word "pahsayèk" which has been variously attributed to mean "valley" or "place where the land splits."

== History ==
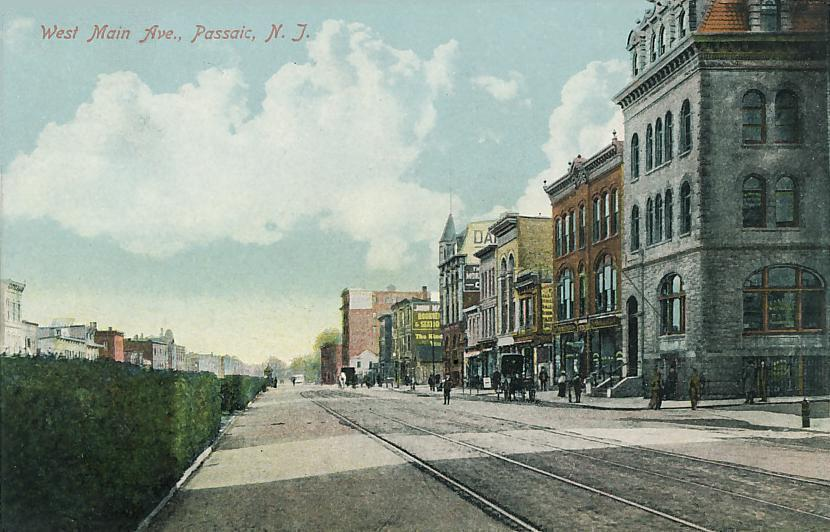
Main Avenue in 1911

The city originated from a Dutch settlement on the Passaic River established in 1679 which was called Acquackanonk. Industrial growth began in the 19th century, as Passaic became a textile and metalworking center.

A commercial center formed around a wharf at the foot of present-day Main Avenue. This came to be commonly known as Acquackanonk Landing, and the settlement that grew around it became known as the Village of Acquackanonk Landing or simply Acquackanonk Landing Settlement. In 1854 Alfred Speer (later owner of the city's first newspaper and public hall) and Judge Henry Simmons were the principals in a political battle over the naming of village. Simmons wished to keep the old name while Speer wanted to simplify it to Passaic Village. Speer was losing the battle however he convinced the U.S. Postmaster General to adopt the name, and hung a Passaic sign at the local railroad depot. The de facto name change was effective.

Passaic was formed as an unincorporated village within Acquackanonk Township (now Clifton) on March 10, 1869. It was incorporated as an independent village on March 21, 1871. Passaic was chartered as a city on April 2, 1873. The Okonite company owned an industrial site here from 1878 to 1993. It was the company's headquarters and primary manufacturing plant for most of the company's history. Early uses of the company's insulated wires include some of the earliest telegraph cables, and the wiring for Thomas Edison's first generating plant, Pearl Street Station in Lower Manhattan. The property was then turned into a furniture factory, whose owners have been attempting to redevelop the property into an upscale mall since 2015.

The 1926 Passaic Textile Strike led by union organizer Albert Weisbord saw 36,000 mill workers leave their jobs to oppose wage cuts demanded by the textile industry. The workers successfully fought to keep their wages unchanged but did not receive recognition of their union by the mill owners.

Passaic has been called "The Birthplace of Television". In 1931, experimental television station W2XCD began transmitting from DeForest Radio Corporation in Passaic. It has been called the first television station to transmit to the home, and was the first such station to broadcast a feature film. Allen B. DuMont, formerly DeForest's chief engineer, opened pioneering TV manufacturer DuMont Laboratories in Passaic in 1937, and started the DuMont Television Network, the world's first commercial television network, in 1946.

In 1992, the voters of Passaic Township in Morris County voted to change the name of their municipality to Long Hill Township, to avoid confusion between the City of Passaic and the largely rural community 22 miles (35 km) away, as well as association with the more urban city.

Passaic is served by two regional newspapers, The Record and Herald News which are both owned by the Gannett company and its predecessor North Jersey Media Group.

The city previously had many of its own newspaper companies, among them Speer's The Passaic Item (1870–1904), the Passaic City Herald (1872–1899), the Passaic Daily Times (1882–1887), the Passaic City Record (1890–1907), the Passaic Daily News (1891–1929), the Passaic Daily Herald (1899–1929), and the Passaic Herald News (1932–1987). The Passaic Herald News went through several mergers with other Passaic County newspapers to become the current Herald News.

== Geography ==
According to the U.S. Census Bureau, the city had a total area of 3.24 square miles (8.39 km^{2}), including 3.13 square miles (8.11 km^{2}) of land and 0.11 square miles (0.28 km^{2}) of water (3.33%).

Passaic's only land border is with neighboring Clifton, which borders Passaic to the north, south, and west. The namesake Passaic River forms the eastern border of Passaic. Four additional neighboring municipalities in southern Bergen County, immediately across the river from Passaic, are East Rutherford, Garfield, Rutherford, and Wallington.

Passaic and Wallington are connected via the Gregory Avenue, Market Street, and Eighth Street bridges. The city connects with Garfield at both the Monroe and Passaic Street Bridges. The road connection with Rutherford is via the Union Avenue Bridge, which is located on an extension off the northbound lanes of Route 21. One cannot cross from Passaic into East Rutherford by vehicle directly, however, as there is no bridge directly connecting the two municipalities. Drivers wanting to cross from Passaic to East Rutherford must use either the Gregory Avenue Bridge, which is located near Wallington's line with East Rutherford, or the Union Avenue Bridge, where East Rutherford can be accessed via surface streets briefly passing through Rutherford.

Passaic is located 10 miles (16 km) from New York City, and 12 miles (19 km) from Newark Airport.

=== The city ===
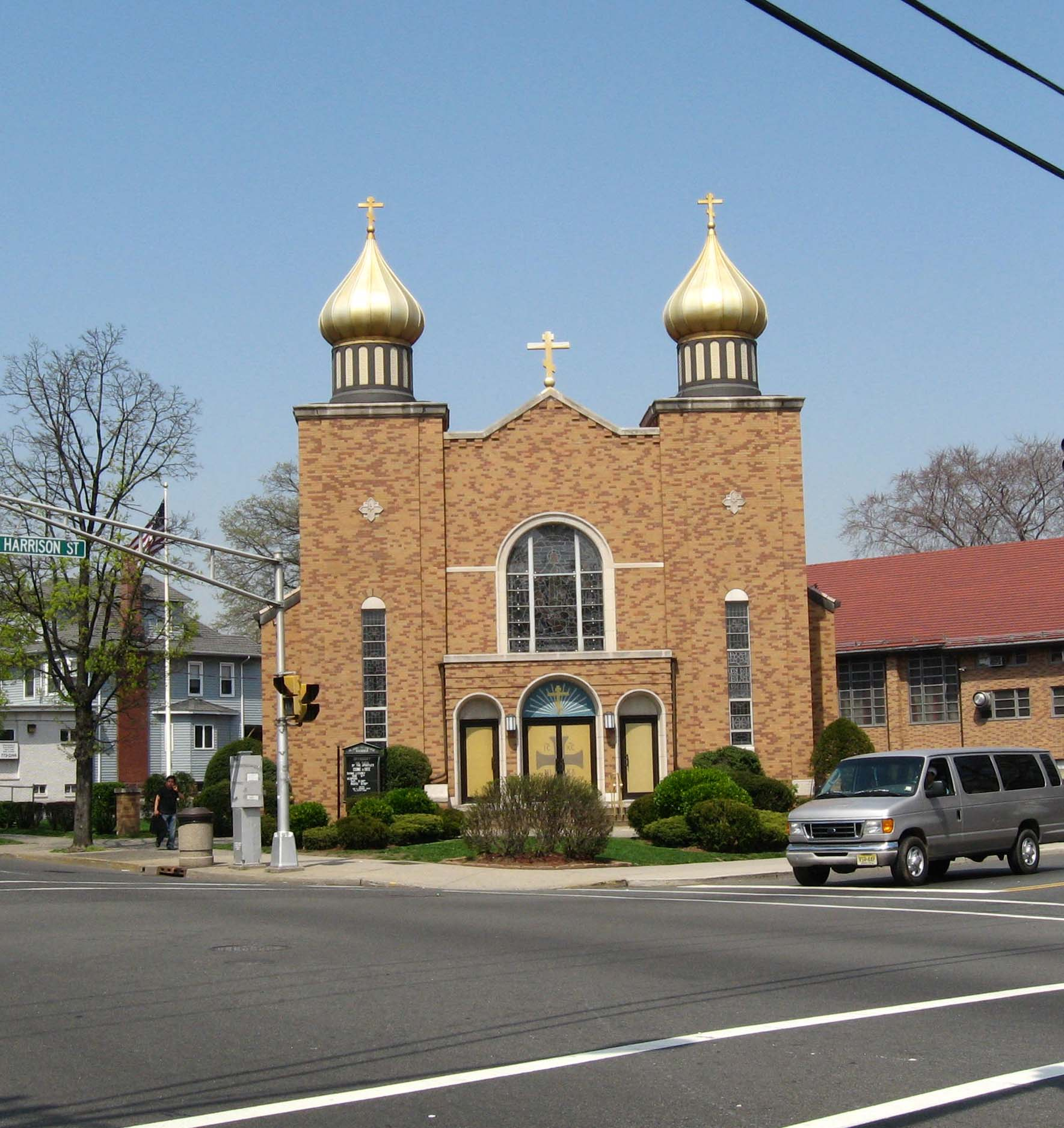
St. John the Baptist Russian Orthodox Church on Lexington Avenue, built in 1959–1960

Passaic has several business districts: Main Avenue begins in Passaic Park and follows the curve of the river to downtown. Broadway runs east–west through the center of the city, ending at Main Avenue in downtown. Main Avenue has many shops, restaurants, and businesses reflecting the city's growing Latino, and declining Eastern European populations in the city.

The city is home to several architecturally notable churches, including St. John's Lutheran Church, First Presbyterian of Passaic, and St. John's Episcopal Church.

==== Passaic Park ====
Many residents of the Passaic Park section of Passaic are part of Orthodox Jewish communities. With over 1,300 families, estimated at a total population of 15,000, Passaic is one of the state's fastest-growing Orthodox communities. It is home to over 20 yeshivas and other educational institutions, as well as many kosher food and other shopping establishments.

The Passaic Park section is noted for its large park and large homes of various architectural styles, especially Queen Anne and Tudor. Several condominium and cooperative apartment complexes are also located there including:

- Carlton Tower, a condominium of 21 floors, the city's tallest structure
- Passaic Towers Apartments, rental across the street from Carlton Tower
- Barry Gardens, co-operative garden apartments built following World War II on a portion of the former Barry Estate
- Presidential Towers, condominium at 180 Lafayette Ave.

=== Climate ===
The climate in this area is characterized by hot, humid summers and generally mild to cool winters. According to the Köppen Climate Classification system, Passaic has a humid subtropical climate, abbreviated "Cfa" on climate maps.

== Demographics ==
Historical population
Census	Pop.	Note	%±
1880	6,532		—
1890	13,028		99.4%
1900	27,777		113.2%
1910	54,773		97.2%
1920	63,841		16.6%
1930	62,959		−1.4%
1940	61,394		−2.5%
1950	57,702		−6.0%
1960	53,963		−6.5%
1970	55,124		2.2%
1980	52,463		−4.8%
1990	58,041		10.6%
2000	67,861		16.9%
2010	69,781		2.8%
2020	70,537		1.1%
2023 (est.)	68,903		−2.3%
Population sources: 1880–1920; 1880–1890 1880–1900 1890–1910; 1910 1880–1930 1940–2000; 2000 2010 2020

Among the speakers of Polish in Passaic are many Gorals.

With over 1,300 families, estimated at a total population of 15,000, Passaic has one of the state's fastest-growing Orthodox Jewish communities. It is home to over 20 yeshivas and other educational institutions, as well as many kosher food and other shopping establishments.

=== 2020 census ===
As of the 2020 census, Passaic had a population of 70,537. The median age was 31.7 years. 30.2% of residents were under the age of 18 and 9.8% of residents were 65 years of age or older. For every 100 females there were 96.6 males, and for every 100 females age 18 and over there were 94.5 males age 18 and over.

100.0% of residents lived in urban areas, while 0.0% lived in rural areas.

There were 20,595 households in Passaic, of which 46.6% had children under the age of 18 living in them. Of all households, 39.0% were married-couple households, 18.4% were households with a male householder and no spouse or partner present, and 33.8% were households with a female householder and no spouse or partner present. About 20.0% of all households were made up of individuals and 8.1% had someone living alone who was 65 years of age or older.

There were 21,513 housing units, of which 4.3% were vacant. The homeowner vacancy rate was 1.2% and the rental vacancy rate was 3.1%.

Racial composition as of the 2020 census
Race	Number	Percent
White	15,200	21.5%
Black or African American	5,316	7.5%
American Indian and Alaska Native	2,268	3.2%
Asian	2,721	3.9%
Native Hawaiian and Other Pacific Islander	50	0.1%
Some other race	34,262	48.6%
Two or more races	10,720	15.2%
Hispanic or Latino (of any race)	51,584	73.1%

=== 2010 census ===
The 2010 United States census counted 69,781 people, 19,411 households, and 14,597 families in the city. The population density was 22,179.6 per square mile (8,563.6/km^{2}). There were 20,432 housing units at an average density of 6,494.2 per square mile (2,507.4/km^{2}). The racial makeup was 45.06% (31,440) White, 10.64% (7,425) Black or African American, 1.07% (745) Native American, 4.36% (3,040) Asian, 0.04% (27) Pacific Islander, 33.37% (23,284) from other races, and 5.47% (3,820) from two or more races. Hispanic or Latino of any race were 71.02% (49,557) of the population. The city's Hispanic population represented the fourth-highest percentage among municipalities in New Jersey as of the 2010 Census.

Of the 19,411 households, 42.8% had children under the age of 18; 41.7% were married couples living together; 23.7% had a female householder with no husband present and 24.8% were non-families. Of all households, 19.5% were made up of individuals and 7.3% had someone living alone who was 65 years of age or older. The average household size was 3.57 and the average family size was 4.02.

31.5% of the population were under the age of 18, 11.4% from 18 to 24, 29.8% from 25 to 44, 19.6% from 45 to 64, and 7.7% who were 65 years of age or older. The median age was 29.2 years. For every 100 females, the population had 100.9 males. For every 100 females ages 18 and older there were 99.2 males.

The Census Bureau's 2006–2010 American Community Survey showed that (in 2010 inflation-adjusted dollars) median household income was $31,135 (with a margin of error of +/− $1,280) and the median family income was $34,934 (+/− $2,987). Males had a median income of $30,299 (+/− $1,883) versus $25,406 (+/− $2,456) for females. The per capita income for the city was $14,424 (+/− $581). About 25.0% of families and 27.5% of the population were below the poverty line, including 35.9% of those under age 18 and 25.5% of those age 65 or over.

Same-sex couples headed 107 households in 2010, a decline from the 142 counted in 2000.

=== 2000 census ===
As of the 2000 United States census, there were 67,861 people, 19,458 households, and 14,457 families residing in the city of Passaic, New Jersey. The population density was 21,804.7 inhabitants per square mile (8,418.8/km^{2}). There were 20,194 housing units at an average density of 6,488.6 per square mile (2,505.3/km^{2}). The racial makeup of the city was 35.43% White, 13.83% African American, 0.78% Native American, 5.51% Asian, 0.04% Pacific Islander, 39.36% from other races, and 5.04% from two or more races. The cultural groupings for Hispanic or Latino of any race were 62.46% of the population.

As of the 2000 census, 59.3% of residents spoke Spanish at home, while 28.9% of residents identified themselves as speaking only English at home. An additional 2.5% were speakers of Gujarati and 2.4% spoke Polish. There were 31,101 foreign-born residents of Passaic in 2000, of which 79.4% were from Latin America, with 31.3% of foreign-born residents from Mexico and 27.2% from the Dominican Republic.

There were 19,458 households, of which 42.0% had children under the age of 18, 43.7% were married couples living together, 21.7% had a female householder with no husband present, and 25.7% were non-families. 8.2% of Passaic households were same-sex partner households. 20.3% of all households were made up of individuals, and 8.4% had someone living alone who was 65 years of age or older. The average household size was 3.46 and the average family size was 3.93. The city population comprised 30.8% under the age of 18, 12.5% from 18 to 24, 31.6% from 25 to 44, 16.9% from 45 to 64, and 8.1% who were 65 years of age or older. The median age was 29 years. For every 100 females, there were 99.5 males. For every 100 females age 18 and over, there were 97.4 males. The median income for a household in the city was $33,594, and the median income for a family was $34,935. Males had a median income of $24,568 versus $21,352 for females. The per capita income for the city was $12,874. About 18.4% of families and 21.2% of the population were below the poverty line, including 27.6% of those under age 18 and 16.0% of those age 65 or over.

== Economy ==
Portions of the city are part of an Urban Enterprise Zone (UEZ), one of 32 zones covering 37 municipalities statewide. The city was selected in 1994 as one of a group of 10 zones added to participate in the program. In addition to other benefits to encourage employment within the UEZ, shoppers can take advantage of a reduced 3.3125% sales tax rate (half of the 6 5/8% rate charged statewide) at eligible merchants. Established in August 1994, the city Urban Enterprise Zone status expires in August 2025. Overseen by the Passaic Enterprise Zone Development Corporation, the program generates $1.2 million annually in tax revenues that are reinvested into the local zone.

== Government ==
=== Local government ===
Passaic is governed by the Faulkner Act system of municipal government, formally known as the Optional Municipal Charter Law, under the Mayor-Council (Plan B), enacted by direct petition as of July 1, 1973. The city is one of 71 municipalities (of the 564) statewide governed under this form. Under this form of government, the governing body is comprised of a mayor and a city council. The mayor is elected directly by the voters for a four-year term of office. The seven members of the city council serve four-year terms on a staggered basis, with either three seats (together with the mayoral seat) or four seats up for election in odd-numbered years. Elections are non-partisan, with all positions selected at-large in balloting held in May.

As of 2026, Passaic's mayor is Hector Carlos Lora. Lora was appointed in 2016 to fill a vacancy that followed the resignation of Democratic mayor Alex Blanco after he was indicted on federal corruption charges; Lora was the Director of the Passaic County Board of Chosen Freeholders at the time and chose to resign his position and accept an appointment to serve as Mayor and finish the remainder of Blanco's unexpired term. Lora was elected to a full term in 2017 and was re-elected in both 2021 and 2025.

Members of the Passaic City Council are Council President Gary Schaer (term ends 2027), Jose R. "Joe" Garcia (2029), Terrence L. Love (2029), Thania Melo (2027), Chaim M. Munk (2027), Daniel S. Mayer (2029), and Maritza Colon-Martinez (2027).

In addition to his role as council president, Schaer also holds a seat in the 36th Legislative District of the New Jersey General Assembly. This dual position, often called double dipping, is allowed under a grandfather clause in the state law enacted by the New Jersey Legislature and signed into law by Governor of New Jersey Jon Corzine in September 2007 that prevents dual-office-holding but allows those who had held both positions as of February 1, 2008, to retain both posts.

Corruption charges over the past decades have resulted in the federal convictions of two mayors, seven councilman and other public officials, all members of the Democratic Party. Passaic Business Administrator Anthony Ianoco was terminated in February 2011, after he was charged with cocaine possession, following his arrest in Hoboken, where police arrested him after he was caught driving the wrong way in a Passaic city vehicle.

Alex Blanco became the first Dominican-American elected as mayor in the United States winning a special election in November 2008 to succeed acting mayor Gary Schaer, who as City Council president automatically moved into the position upon the resignation by previous mayor Samuel Rivera, after Rivera pleaded guilty to corruption charges. Blanco was elected to serve the remainder of Rivera's term, and was re-elected to a full term on May 12, 2009, with 53.1% of votes cast. He won running against Passaic Board of Education member Vinny Capuana.

In November 2016, Blanco pled guilty to a single federal count of bribery, agreeing to resign immediately Blanco admitted in court to accepting $110,000 in bribes from two unnamed housing developers in exchange for directing more than $200,000 in HUD funds to a failed low-income housing development. He faced up to 10 years in federal prison upon sentencing, scheduled for February 2017. He was succeeded by Passaic County Freeholder Hector Lora, in an appointment made by the City Council. Blanco is the second consecutive elected mayor of Passaic, and the third in two decades (following Joseph Lipari and Sammy Rivera), to be convicted of or plead guilty to official misconduct charges.

=== Federal, state, and county representation ===
Passaic is located in the 9th Congressional District and is part of New Jersey's 36th state legislative district. Prior to the 2010 Census, Passaic had been part of the 8th Congressional District, a change made by the New Jersey Redistricting Commission that took effect in January 2013, based on the results of the November 2012 general elections.

For the 119th United States Congress, New Jersey's 9th congressional district is represented by Nellie Pou (D, North Haledon) New Jersey is represented in the United States Senate by Democrats Cory Booker (Newark, term ends 2027) and Andy Kim (Moorestown, term ends 2031).

For the 2026–2027 session, the 36th legislative district of the New Jersey Legislature is represented in the State Senate by Paul Sarlo (D, Wood-Ridge) and in the General Assembly by Clinton Calabrese (D, Cliffside Park) and Gary Schaer (D, Passaic).

Passaic County is governed by a Board of County Commissioners, comprised of seven members who are elected at-large to staggered three-year terms office on a partisan basis, with two or three seats coming up for election each year as part of the November general election in a three-year cycle. At a reorganization meeting held in January, the board selects a Director and Deputy Director from among its members to serve for a one-year term. As of 2026, Passaic County's Commissioners are: Director Cassandra "Sandi" Lazzara (D), Little Falls, term as commissioner ends December 31, 2027; term as director ends 2026), Deputy Director Orlando Cruz (D, Paterson, term as commissioner and as deputy director ends 2026), Rodney DeVore (D, Paterson, 2027), Bruce James (D, Clifton, 2026) Michael Ramaglia (D, West Milford, 2028), Christina Schratz (D, Passaic, 2028) and Nick Veliky (D, Clifton, appointed to a term ending in 2027).

Constitutional officers, elected on a countywide basis, are County Clerk Danielle Ireland-Imhof (D, Hawthorne, 2028), Sheriff Thomas Adamo (D, Wayne, 2027) and Surrogate Zoila S. Cassanova (D, Wayne, 2026).

=== Politics ===
As of March 2011, there were a total of 24,227 registered voters in Passaic, of which 8,753 (36.1% vs. 31.0% countywide) were registered as Democrats, 2,063 (8.5% vs. 18.7%) were registered as Republicans and 13,408 (55.3% vs. 50.3%) were registered as Unaffiliated. There were 3 voters registered to other parties. Among the city's 2010 Census population, 34.7% (vs. 53.2% in Passaic County) were registered to vote, including 50.7% of those ages 18 and over (vs. 70.8% countywide).

Gubernatorial election results for Passaic
Year	Republican		Democratic		Third party(ies)	
Year	No.	%	No.	%	No.	%
2025	4,290	35.97%	7,548	63.28%	89	0.75%
2021	2,178	30.45%	4,907	68.60%	68	0.95%
2017	1,284	20.60%	4,664	74.84%	284	4.56%
2013	2,697	39.12%	4,109	59.60%	88	1.28%
2009	2,319	27.43%	5,958	70.48%	176	2.08%
2005	1,987	23.32%	6,261	73.49%	272	3.19%

In the 2012 presidential election, Democrat Barack Obama received 77.1% of the vote (12,011 cast), ahead of Republican Mitt Romney with 22.1% (3,447 votes), and other candidates with 0.8% (119 votes), among the 15,755 ballots cast by the city's 27,433 registered voters (178 ballots were spoiled), for a turnout of 57.4%. In the 2008 presidential election, Democrat Barack Obama received 12,386 votes (72.7% vs. 58.8% countywide), ahead of Republican John McCain with 4,012 votes (23.6% vs. 37.7%) and other candidates with 93 votes (0.5% vs. 0.8%), among the 17,033 ballots cast by the city's 25,496 registered voters, for a turnout of 66.8% (vs. 70.4% in Passaic County). In the 2004 presidential election, Democrat John Kerry received 9,539 votes (66.3% vs. 53.9% countywide), ahead of Republican George W. Bush with 4,291 votes (29.8% vs. 42.7%) and other candidates with 62 votes (0.4% vs. 0.7%), among the 14,391 ballots cast by the city's 23,389 registered voters, for a turnout of 61.5% (vs. 69.3% in the whole county).

Presidential elections results
Year	Republican	Democratic	Third Parties
2024	52.3% 8,775	45.8% 7,679	1.9% 257
2020	36.1% 6,834	61.4% 11,638	2.5% 162
2016	22.8% 3,610	74.1% 11,738	2.1% 340
2012	22.1% 3,447	77.1% 12,011	0.8% 119
2008	23.6% 4,012	72.7% 12,386	0.5% 93
2004	29.8% 4,291	66.3% 9,539	0.4% 62

In the 2013 gubernatorial election, Democrat Barbara Buono received 59.6% of the vote (4,109 cast), ahead of Republican Chris Christie with 39.1% (2,697 votes), and other candidates with 1.3% (88 votes), among the 7,143 ballots cast by the city's 28,209 registered voters (249 ballots were spoiled), for a turnout of 25.3%. In the 2009 gubernatorial election, Democrat Jon Corzine received 5,958 ballots cast (68.7% vs. 50.8% countywide), ahead of Republican Chris Christie with 2,319 votes (26.7% vs. 43.2%), Independent Chris Daggett with 124 votes (1.4% vs. 3.8%) and other candidates with 52 votes (0.6% vs. 0.9%), among the 8,672 ballots cast by the city's 24,219 registered voters, yielding a 35.8% turnout (vs. 42.7% in the county).

United States Senate election results for Passaic1
Year	Republican		Democratic		Third party(ies)	
Year	No.	%	No.	%	No.	%
2024	6,665	45.32%	7,613	51.76%	430	2.92%
2018	2,636	23.47%	8,028	71.47%	568	5.06%
2012	2,400	17.73%	10,920	80.68%	215	1.59%
2006	1,850	23.71%	5,855	75.05%	96	1.23%

United States Senate election results for Passaic2
Year	Republican		Democratic		Third party(ies)	
Year	No.	%	No.	%	No.	%
2020	5,106	28.32%	12,289	68.16%	634	3.52%
2014	1,079	17.02%	5,164	81.45%	97	1.53%
2013	1,123	23.66%	3,553	74.86%	70	1.47%
2008	2,199	18.81%	8,882	75.97%	610	5.22%

== Education ==
=== Public ===
The Passaic City School District is a comprehensive community public school district serving students in pre-kindergarten through twelfth grade. The district is one of 31 former Abbott districts statewide that were established pursuant to the decision by the New Jersey Supreme Court in Abbott v. Burke which are now referred to as "SDA Districts" based on the requirement for the state to cover all costs for school building and renovation projects in these districts under the supervision of the New Jersey Schools Development Authority. As of the 2018–19 school year, the district, comprised of 17 schools, had an enrollment of 14,504 students and 839.8 classroom teachers (on an FTE basis), for a student–teacher ratio of 17.3:1.

Schools in the district (with 2018–19 enrollment data from the National Center for Education Statistics) are Vincent Capuana School No. 15 (277; Pre-K), Sallie D. Gamble School No. 16 (465; Pre-K), Thomas Jefferson School No. 1 (788; K–8), George Washington School No. 2 (172; K–1), Mario J. Drago School No. 3 (formerly Franklin School) (803; Pre-K–8), Benito Juárez School No. 5 (472; K–8), Martin Luther King Jr. School No. 6 (1,124; Pre-K–8), Ulysses S. Grant School No. 7 (391; Pre-K–1), Casimir Pulaski School No. 8 (%32; Pre-K–8), Etta Gero School No. 9 (690; 2–8), Theodore Roosevelt School No. 10 (905; Pre-K–8), William B. Cruise Veterans Memorial School No. 11 (1,253; K–8), Daniel F. Ryan School No. 19 (874; Pre-K/2–8), Passaic Gifted and Talented Academy School No. 20 (959; 2–8), Sonia Sotomayor School No. 21 (; Pre-K–5), Passaic Academy for Science and Engineering (702; 6–11), Passaic Preparatory Academy, (701; 6–11) and Passaic High School (2,618; 9–12).

Passaic County Community College opened a new campus in the city in September 2008, allowing the college to serve the 15% of students who are local residents of Passaic City. The college's nursing program was relocated to and expanded at the Passaic campus, providing a qualified program to help fill the longstanding nursing shortage.

=== Private / Religious ===
St. Nicholas Ukrainian Catholic School is an elementary school founded in 1943 that operates under the supervision of the Roman Catholic Diocese of Paterson and the Ukrainian Catholic Archeparchy of Philadelphia.

Established in 1895, the Collegiate School is a private coeducational day school located in Passaic which serves students in pre-kindergarten through twelfth grade.

The Yeshiva Gedola of Passaic is an institute of Talmudic learning for post-high-school-age men. It is led by Rosh Yeshiva Rabbi Meir Stern. Passaic has two primary Orthodox K–8 elementary schools, Yeshiva Ketana and YBH of Passaic; each of them has a boys and girls division.

Noble Leadership Academy is an Islamic school located downtown, serving students 320 students from pre-kindergarten to 12th grade.

== Emergency services ==
=== Police ===
In October 2016, Deputy Chief Luis Guzman became the first Dominican-American to be selected to lead the city's police department.

=== Fire ===
The Passaic Fire Department (PFD) is a paid fire department with over 100 firefighters. The PFD was organized in November 1869 and became a paid department in 1909. There are two fire houses equipped with four engines and two ladder trucks. Passaic also operates a large foam tanker truck, a Quick Attack Response Vehicle (QRV), a haz-mat decon trailer, a utility unit, a rehab unit, and a Zodiac rescue boat.

=== Ambulance ===
In October 2015, the city approved a contract under which ambulance service in the city is covered by Monmouth Ocean Hospital Service Corporation (MONOC), a non-profit consortium which also provides paramedic services to other municipalities in the area. Under the plan Passaic laid off 30 EMS workers who had been employed by the city.

Hatzolah of Passaic/Clifton EMS is a volunteer service that primarily covers the Passaic Park section of town and parts of Clifton, in addition to assisting Passaic Police and EMS when requested in other parts of the city. Hatzolah operates two ambulances strategically parked throughout the community with a third on standby and available to assist neighboring chapters.

=== Office of Emergency Management ===
The OEM coordinates emergency response by all of the city's agencies—Police, Fire, Ambulance, health, and public works—to disasters and other emergencies, including large storms. The city OEM is affiliated with the Passaic County and New Jersey State OEM agencies and with the state's Emergency Management Association.

OEM also manages street traffic at all large events in the city, including festivals and parades.

The office is run by representatives of the Police and Fire departments. In addition to city staff, it makes use of volunteers from Passaic's Community Emergency Response Team and other community organizations.

== Transportation ==
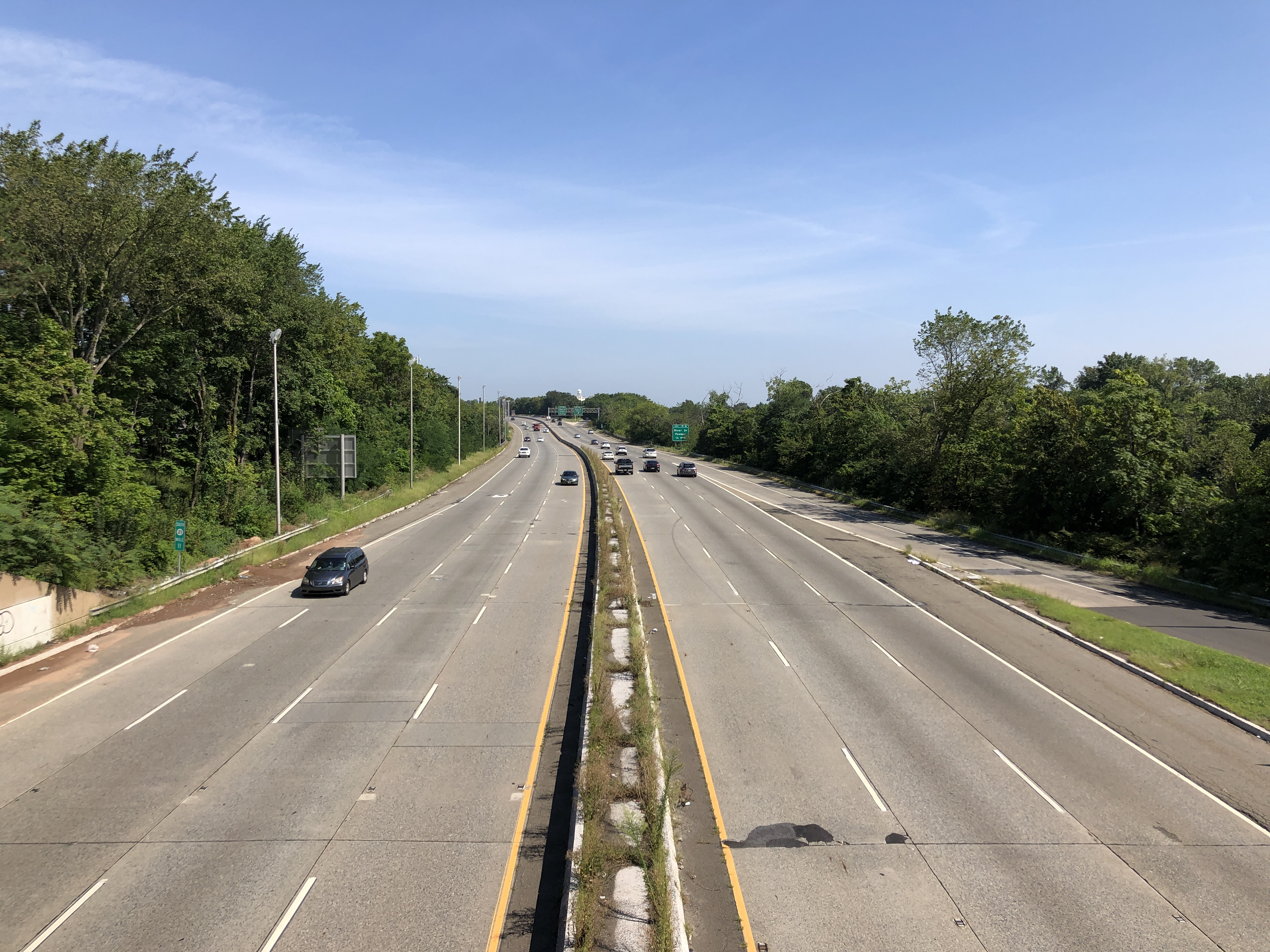
Route 21 northbound in Passaic

=== Roads and highways ===
As of May 2010, the city had a total of 70.14 miles (112.88 km) of roadways, of which 53.20 miles (85.62 km) were maintained by the municipality, 13.82 miles (22.24 km) by Passaic County and 3.12 miles (5.02 km) by the New Jersey Department of Transportation.

The main highway directly serving Passaic is Route 21. New Jersey Route 3, the Garden State Parkway and I-80 are nearby. The city has six bridges in use spanning the Passaic River. A seventh bridge serves railroad traffic but is not currently in use.

=== Public transportation ===
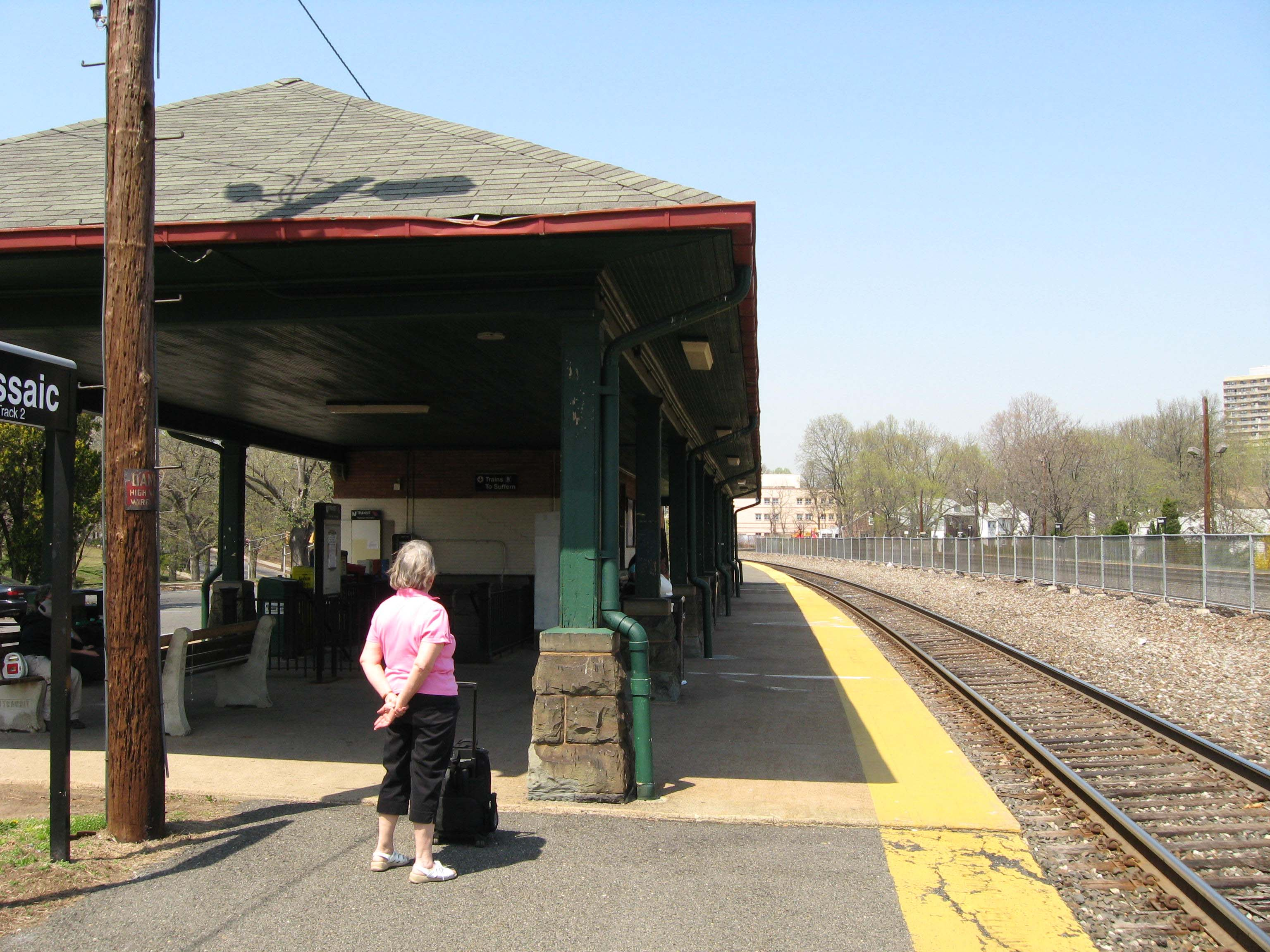
Passaic station

Local bus transportation, much passing through the Passaic Bus Terminal, is provided by NJ Transit and Community Coach with service to Paterson, Rutherford, Newark, Clifton, Garfield, and Wallington among other locations on the 74, 702, 703, 705, 707, 709, 744, 758, and 780 routes. NJ Transit bus routes 151, 161, and 190 provide local service and interstate service to the Port Authority Bus Terminal in New York City.

NJ Transit's Passaic rail station is located in the Passaic Park section, providing service on the Main Line southbound to Hoboken Terminal, and to Secaucus Junction for NJ Transit connections to New York Penn Station in New York City, Newark Airport and points north and south. Northbound service is provided to Paterson, Ridgewood and New York state stations in Suffern and Port Jervis.

Passaic formerly had four train stations (Passaic Park, Prospect Street, Passaic and Harrison Street) on the Erie Railroad main line. In 1963, these stations were abandoned and the main line was moved to the Boonton Branch.

Commuter jitney buses operate along Main Avenue providing frequent non-scheduled service to Paterson, Union City, the George Washington Bridge Bus Terminal in Washington Heights, Manhattan, the Port Authority Bus Terminal, and points between.

== Films shot in Passaic ==
- 2009: The NBC series Mercy was set at and filmed in the old St Mary's Hospital.
- 2006: Be Kind Rewind directed by Michel Gondry.
