= Electoral history of Chris Smith =

American political record

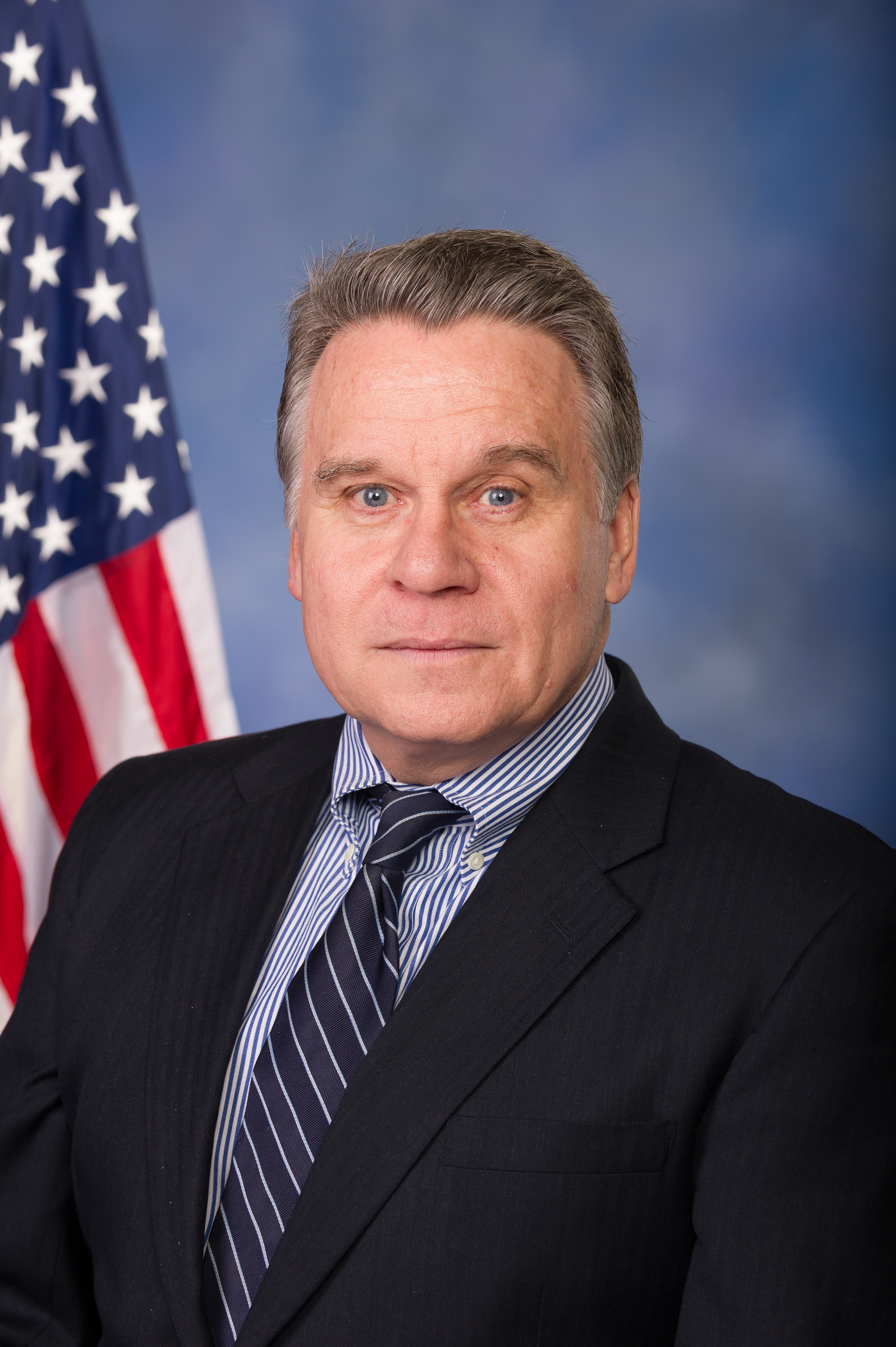
Official portrait, 2014.

Chris Smith is an American politician from New Jersey who is currently serving in the U.S. House of Representatives since 1981. Smith has solely represented New Jersey's 4th congressional district, which has been situated in central New Jersey since the start of his term. He is currently the dean of the New Jersey congressional delegation, and is one of the longest serving members of the House.

== U.S. House of Representatives ==
=== 1970s ===
1978 New Jersey's 4th congressional district election
Primary election
Party	Candidate	Votes	%
Republican	Chris Smith	6,549	100.0
Total votes		6,549	100.0
General election
Democratic	Frank Thompson (incumbent)	69,259	61.1
Republican	Chris Smith	41,833	36.9
Betsy Ross Party	John V. Mahalchik	1,145	1.0
Work With People	Paul B. Rizzo	827	0.7
God We Trust	Judson Carter, Sr.	318	0.3
Total votes		113,382	100.0
Democratic hold			

=== 1980s ===
1980 New Jersey's 4th congressional district election
Primary election
Party	Candidate	Votes	%
Republican	Chris Smith	8,121	82.9
Republican	John D. Scalamonti	1,676	17.1
Total votes		9,797	100.0
General election
Republican	Chris Smith	95,447	56.7
Democratic	Frank Thompson (incumbent)	68,480	40.7
Libertarian	Jack Moyers	2,801	1.7
No Slogan	Paul B. Rizzo	1,549	0.9
Total votes		168,277	100.0
Republican gain from Democratic			

1982 New Jersey's 4th congressional district election
Primary election
Party	Candidate	Votes	%
Republican	Chris Smith (incumbent)	15,295	100.0
Total votes		15,295	100.0
General election
Republican	Chris Smith (incumbent)	85,660	52.7
Democratic	Joseph P. Merlino	75,658	46.5
Libertarian	Bill Harris	662	0.4
No Slogan	Paul B. Rizzo	374	0.2
World Federalist	Eugene Allan Creech	241	0.1
Total votes		162,595	100.0
Republican hold			

1984 New Jersey's 4th congressional district election
Primary election
Party	Candidate	Votes	%
Republican	Chris Smith (incumbent)	13,049	100.0
Total votes		13,049	100.0
General election
Republican	Chris Smith (incumbent)	139,295	61.3
Democratic	James C. Hedden	87,908	38.7
Total votes		227,203	100.0
Republican hold			

1986 New Jersey's 4th congressional district election
Primary election
Party	Candidate	Votes	%
Republican	Chris Smith (incumbent)	8,008	100.0
Total votes		8,008	100.0
General election
Republican	Chris Smith (incumbent)	78,699	61.5
Democratic	Jeffrey Laurenti	49,290	38.5
Total votes		127,989	100.0
Republican hold			

1988 New Jersey's 4th congressional district election
Primary election
Party	Candidate	Votes	%
Republican	Chris Smith (incumbent)	12,974	100.0
Total votes		12,974	100.0
General election
Republican	Chris Smith (incumbent)	155,183	65.7
Democratic	Betty Holland	79,006	33.5
Independent	Judson M. Carter	1,114	0.5
Libertarian	Daniel A. Maiullo, Jr.	791	0.3
Total votes		236,094	100.0
Republican hold			

=== 1990s ===
1990 New Jersey's 4th congressional district election
Primary election
Party	Candidate	Votes	%
Republican	Chris Smith (incumbent)	10,704	100.0
Total votes		10,704	100.0
General election
Republican	Chris Smith (incumbent)	99,920	62.7
Democratic	Mark Setaro	54,961	34.5
Libertarian	Carl Peters	2,178	1.4
Populist Party	Joseph J. Notarangelo	1,206	0.8
God We Trust	J. M. Carter	1,034	0.6
Total votes		159,299	100.0
Republican hold			

1992 New Jersey's 4th congressional district election
Primary election
Party	Candidate	Votes	%
Republican	Chris Smith (incumbent)	19,085	100.0
Total votes		19,085	100.0
General election
Republican	Chris Smith (incumbent)	149,095	61.8
Democratic	Brian M. Hughes	84,514	35.0
Libertarian	Benjamin Grindlinder	2,984	1.2
Independent	Patrick C. Pasculli	2,137	0.9
Conservative	Agnes A. James	1,630	0.7
America First Populist	Joseph J. Notarangelo	865	0.4
Total votes		241,225	100.0
Republican hold			

1994 New Jersey's 4th congressional district election
Primary election
Party	Candidate	Votes	%
Republican	Chris Smith (incumbent)	15,358	100.0
Total votes		15,358	100.0
General election
Republican	Chris Smith (incumbent)	109,818	67.9
Democratic	Ralph Walsh	49,537	30.6
Conservative	Leonard P. Marshall	1,579	1.0
Natural Law	Arnold Kokans	833	0.5
Total votes		161,767	100.0
Republican hold			

1996 New Jersey's 4th congressional district election
Primary election
Party	Candidate	Votes	%
Republican	Chris Smith (incumbent)	17,080	100.0
Total votes		17,080	100.0
General election
Republican	Chris Smith (incumbent)	146,404	63.6
Democratic	Kevin John Meara	77,565	33.7
Independent	Robert Figueroa	3,000	1.3
Independent	J. Morgan Strong	2,034	0.9
Independent	Arnold Kokans	1,111	0.5
Total votes		230,114	100.0
Republican hold			

1998 New Jersey's 4th congressional district election
Primary election
Party	Candidate	Votes	%
Republican	Chris Smith (incumbent)	10,526	100.0
Total votes		10,526	100.0
General election
Republican	Chris Smith (incumbent)	92,991	62.2
Democratic	Larry Schneider	52,281	35.0
Independent	Keith Quarles	1,753	1.2
Independent	Morgan Strong	1,498	1.0
Independent	Nick Mellis	1,054	0.7
Total votes		149,577	100.0
Republican hold			

=== 2000s ===
2000 New Jersey's 4th congressional district election
Primary election
Party	Candidate	Votes	%
Republican	Chris Smith (incumbent)	20,062	100.0
Total votes		20,062	100.0
General election
Republican	Chris Smith (incumbent)	158,515	63.2
Democratic	Reed Gusciora	87,956	35.1
Green	Stuart Chaifetz	3,627	1.4
Unthinkable Courage	Paul D. Teel	712	0.3
Total votes		250,810	100.0
Republican hold			

2002 New Jersey's 4th congressional district election
Primary election
Party	Candidate	Votes	%
Republican	Chris Smith (incumbent)	19,667	100.0
Total votes		19,667	100.0
General election
Republican	Chris Smith (incumbent)	115,293	66.1
Democratic	Mary Brennan	55,967	32.1
Libertarian	Keith Quarles	1,211	0.7
Honesty, Humanity, Duty	Hermann Winkelmann	1,063	0.6
Conservative	Don Graham	767	0.4
Total votes		174,301	100.0
Republican hold			

2004 New Jersey's 4th congressional district election
Primary election
Party	Candidate	Votes	%
Republican	Chris Smith (incumbent)	14,350	100.0
Total votes		14,350	100.0
General election
Republican	Chris Smith (incumbent)	192,671	67.0
Democratic	Amy Vasquez	92,826	32.3
Libertarian	Richard Edgar	2,056	0.7
Total votes		287,553	100.0
Republican hold			

2006 New Jersey's 4th congressional district election
Primary election
Party	Candidate	Votes	%
Republican	Chris Smith (incumbent)	16,109	100.0
Total votes		16,109	100.0
General election
Republican	Chris Smith (incumbent)	124,482	65.7
Democratic	Carol E. Gay	62,905	33.2
Libertarian	Richard Edgar	1,539	0.8
Remove Medical Negligence	Louis B. Wary Jr	614	0.3
Total votes		189,540	100.0
Republican hold			

2008 New Jersey's 4th congressional district election
Primary election
Party	Candidate	Votes	%
Republican	Chris Smith (incumbent)	16,818	100.0
Total votes		16,818	100.0
General election
Republican	Chris Smith (incumbent)	202,972	66.2
Democratic	Joshua M. Zeitz	100,036	32.6
Green	Steven Welzer	3,543	1.2
Total votes		306,551	100.0
Republican hold			

=== 2010s ===
2010 New Jersey's 4th congressional district election
Primary election
Party	Candidate	Votes	%
Republican	Chris Smith (incumbent)	21,723	68.8
Republican	Alan Bateman	9,839	31.1
Total votes		31,562	100.0
General election
Republican	Chris Smith (incumbent)	129,752	69.4
Democratic	Howard Kleinhendler	52,118	27.9
Libertarian	Joe Siano	2,912	1.6
Green	Steven Welzer	1,574	0.8
American Renaissance Movement	David R. Meiswinkle	582	0.3
Total votes		186,938	100.0
Republican hold			

2012 New Jersey's 4th congressional district election
Primary election
Party	Candidate	Votes	%
Republican	Chris Smith (incumbent)	21,520	83.6
Republican	Terrence McGowan	4,209	16.4
Total votes		25,729	100.0
General election
Republican	Chris Smith (incumbent)	195,146	63.7
Democratic	Brian P. Froelich	107,992	35.3
No Slogan	Leonard P. Marshall	3,111	1.0
Total votes		306,249	100.0
Republican hold			

2014 New Jersey's 4th congressional district election
Primary election
Party	Candidate	Votes	%
Republican	Chris Smith (incumbent)	14,810	100.0
Total votes		14,810	100.0
General election
Republican	Chris Smith (incumbent)	118,826	68.0
Democratic	Ruben M. Scolavino	54,415	31.1
D-R Party	Scott Neuman	1,608	0.9
Total votes		174,849	100.0
Republican hold			

2016 New Jersey's 4th congressional district election
Primary election
Party	Candidate	Votes	%
Republican	Chris Smith (incumbent)	41,789	92.0
Republican	Bruce C. MacDonald	3,645	8.0
Total votes		45,434	100.0
General election
Republican	Chris Smith (incumbent)	211,992	63.7
Democratic	Lorna Phillipson	111,532	33.5
Economic Growth	Hank Schroeder	5,840	1.8
Libertarian	Scott Neuman	3,320	1.0
Total votes		332,684	100.0
Republican hold			

2018 New Jersey's 4th congressional district election
Primary election
Party	Candidate	Votes	%
Republican	Chris Smith (incumbent)	25,930	100.0
Total votes		25,930	100.0
General election
Republican	Chris Smith (incumbent)	163,065	55.4
Democratic	Joshua Welle	126,766	43.1
Libertarian	Michael Rufo	1,387	0.5
Ed the Barber	Edward C. Stackhouse, Jr.	1,065	0.4
Check This Column	Brian J. Reynolds	851	0.3
The Inclusion Candidate	Felicia Stoler	844	0.3
Time for Change	Allen Yusufov	371	0.1
Total votes		294,339	100.0
Republican hold			

=== 2020s ===
2020 New Jersey's 4th congressional district election
Primary election
Party	Candidate	Votes	%
Republican	Chris Smith (incumbent)	51,636	94.8
Republican	Alter Eliezer Richter	2,853	5.2
Total votes		54,489	100.0
General election
Republican	Chris Smith (incumbent)	254,103	59.9
Democratic	Joshua Welle	162,420	38.3
Make Change Happen	Hank Shroeder	3,195	0.8
Libertarian	Michael Rufo	2,583	0.6
Common Sense Party	Andrew Pachuta	2,067	0.5
Total votes		424,368	100.0
Republican hold			

2022 New Jersey's 4th congressional district election
Primary election
Party	Candidate	Votes	%
Republican	Chris Smith (incumbent)	33,136	57.8
Republican	Mike Crispi	21,115	36.8
Republican	Steve Gray	2,305	4.0
Republican	Mike Blasi	751	1.3
Total votes		57,307	100.0
General election
Republican	Chris Smith (incumbent)	173,288	66.9
Democratic	Matthew Jenkins	81,233	31.4
Libertarian	Jason Cullen	1,902	0.7
We The People	David Schmidt	1,197	0.5
No Slogan Filed	Hank Shroeder	905	0.3
Progress with Pam	Pam Daniels	437	0.2
Total votes		258,962	100.0
Republican hold			

2024 New Jersey's 4th congressional district election
Primary election
Party	Candidate	Votes	%
Republican	Chris Smith (incumbent)	36,897	84.9
Republican	David Schmidt	6,538	15.1
Total votes		43,435	100.0
General election
Republican	Chris Smith (incumbent)	265,652	67.4
Democratic	Matthew Jenkins	124,803	31.7
Libertarian	John Morrison	1,950	0.5
Green	Barry Bendar	1,823	0.5
Total votes		394,228	100.0
Republican hold			
