= New Jersey's 13th legislative district =

American legislative district

- Senator: Declan O'Scanlon (R)
- Assembly members: Gerard Scharfenberger (R); Vicky Flynn (R)
- Registration: 34.63% Republican; 26.36% Democratic; 38.03% unaffiliated
- Demographics: 79.9% White; 2.7% Black/African American; 0.2% Native American; 7.7% Asian; 0.0% Hawaiian/Pacific Islander; 2.6% Other race; 6.9% Two or more races; 8.7% Hispanic
- Population: 227,695
- Voting-age population: 178,696
- Registered voters: 183,388

New Jersey's 13th legislative district is one of 40 in the state, covering the Monmouth County municipalities of Aberdeen Township, Atlantic Highlands, Hazlet, Highlands, Holmdel Township, Keansburg, Keyport, Little Silver, Marlboro Township, Middletown Township, Monmouth Beach, Oceanport, Rumson, Sea Bright, Union Beach and West Long Branch.

== Demographic characteristics ==
As of the 2020 United States census, the district had a population of 227,695, of whom 178,696 (78.5%) were of voting age. The racial makeup of the district was 181,986 (79.9%) White, 6,158 (2.7%) African American, 355 (0.2%) Native American, 17,581 (7.7%) Asian, 40 (0.0%) Pacific Islander, 5,858 (2.6%) from some other race, and 15,717 (6.9%) from two or more races. Hispanic or Latino of any race were 19,915 (8.7%) of the population.

The district had 183,388 registered voters as of December 1, 2021, of whom 74,386 (40.6%) were registered as unaffiliated, 56,393 (30.8%) were registered as Republicans, 50,499 (27.5%) were registered as Democrats, and 2,110 (1.1%) were registered to other parties.

== Political representation ==
For the 2026–2027 session, the 13th legislative district of the New Jersey Legislature is represented in the New Jersey Senate by Declan O'Scanlon (R, Little Silver) and in the General Assembly by Vicky Flynn (R, Holmdel Township) and Gerard Scharfenberger (R, Middletown Township).

The legislative district overlaps with New Jersey's 4th and 6th congressional districts.

== 1965–1973 ==
In the interim period between the 1964 Supreme Court decision Reynolds v. Sims which required the creation of state legislature districts to be made as equal in population as possible and the 1973 creation of the 40-district map, the 13th district consisted of all of Bergen County. Senators were elected at-large from the entire county (four members in the 1965 election, five in the 1967 and 1971 elections) while the district was split into five Assembly districts that each elected two members.

The members elected to the Senate from this district are as follows:

Session	Senators elected					
1966–1967	4	Ned J. Parsekian (D)	Matthew Feldman (D)	Jeremiah F. O'Connor (D)	Alfred Kiefer (D)	
1968–1969	5	Fairleigh Dickinson Jr. (R)	Joseph C. Woodcock (R)	Alfred D. Schiaffo (R)	Garrett W. Hagedorn (R)	Willard B. Knowlton (R)
1970–1971	5	Fairleigh Dickinson Jr. (R)	Joseph C. Woodcock (R)	Alfred D. Schiaffo (R)	Garrett W. Hagedorn (R)	Willard B. Knowlton (R)
1972–1973	5	Harold C. Hollenbeck (R)	Joseph C. Woodcock (Note: Resigned November 29, 1973 to become a Bergen County Prosecutor) (R)	Garrett W. Hagedorn (R)	Alfred D. Schiaffo (R) (Note: Resigned November 29, 1973 to become a Bergen County judge)	Frederick E. Wendel (R)

The members elected to the Assembly from each district are as follows:

Session	District 13A	District 13B	District 13C	District 13D	District 13E
1968–1969	Harold C. Hollenbeck (R)	Thomas Costa (R)	William M. Crane (R)	Peter Moraites (R)	Richard Vander Plaat (R)
1968–1969	Peter J. Russo (R)	Austin Volk (R)	Michael J. Ferrara (R)	Harry Randall Jr. (R)	Richard W. DeKorte (R)
1970–1971	Harold C. Hollenbeck (R)	Thomas Costa (R)	Richard Vander Plaat (R)	Peter Moraites (R)	Austin Volk (R)
1970–1971	Peter J. Russo (R)	William J. Dorgan (R) (Note: Resigned September 1, 1971)	William M. Crane (R)	Richard W. DeKorte (R)	Edward A. Connell (R)
1972–1973	Peter J. Russo (R)	Byron Baer (D)	C. Gus Rys (R)	Charles E. Reid (R)	Robert C. Veit (R)
1972–1973	Harold A. Pareti (R)	Albert Burstein (D)	John A. Spizziri (R)	Richard W. DeKorte (R) (Note: Resigned April 30, 1973 to become personal counsel to Gov. William T. Cahill)	Edward H. Hynes (D)

== District composition since 1973 ==
When the 40-district legislative map was created in 1973, the 13th district was located in the capital region of the state, only including Trenton and Hamilton Township in Mercer County. In the 1981 redistricting, the 13th was moved to encompass the northern Monmouth County shoreline (including Middletown Township, Hazlet, Matawan) and Old Bridge Township in Middlesex County. Following the 1991 redistricting, Matawan was removed but Spotswood in Middlesex County was added to the 13th. The district reverted to its 1981 configuration in 2001 with the exception of the addition of Holmdel. In the 2011 redistricting, the 13th district was located entirely in Monmouth County by removing Old Bridge and adding some of boroughs in the northeast corner of the county including Atlantic Highlands, Highlands, Monmouth Beach, and Oceanport. West Long Branch was added in 2023, while Fair Haven, New Jersey was shifted to the 11th legislative district.

Helen Chiarello Szabo took office in a November 1976 special election to succeed S. Howard Woodson, who resigned in September 1976 to head the New Jersey Civil Service Commission. In turn, Szabo stepped down in September 1978 to become the superintendent of elections in Mercer County and was succeeded in a November 1978 special election by Gerald R. Stockman.

== Election history ==
Session	Senate	General Assembly	
1974–1975	Joseph P. Merlino (D)	Francis J. McManimon (D)	S. Howard Woodson (D)
1976–1977	Joseph P. Merlino (D)	Francis J. McManimon (D)	S. Howard Woodson (D) (Note: Resigned September 27, 1976 to become head of New Jersey Civil Service Commission)
1976–1977	Joseph P. Merlino (D)	Francis J. McManimon (D)	Helen Chiarello Szabo (D) (Note: Elected in November 1976 special election, sworn in on November 8, 1976)
1978–1979	Joseph P. Merlino (D)	Francis J. McManimon (D)	Helen Chiarello Szabo (D) (Note: Resigned September 25, 1978 to become Mercer County elections superintendent)
1978–1979	Joseph P. Merlino (D)	Francis J. McManimon (D)	Gerald R. Stockman (D) (Note: Elected in November 1978 special election, sworn in November 13, 1978)
1980–1981	Joseph P. Merlino (D)	Francis J. McManimon (D)	Gerald R. Stockman (D)
1982–1983	John P. Gallagher (R)	Richard Van Wagner (D)	Bill Flynn (D)
1984–1985	Richard Van Wagner (D)	Jacqueline Walker (D)	Bill Flynn (D)
1986–1987	Richard Van Wagner (D)	Joseph Azzolina (R)	Joann H. Smith (R)
1988–1989	Richard Van Wagner (D) (Note: Resigned July 19, 1991 to take a job at the Sports and Exposition Authority)	Joe Kyrillos (R)	Joann H. Smith (R)
1990–1991	Richard Van Wagner (D)	Joe Kyrillos (R)	Joann H. Smith (R)
1990–1991	James T. Phillips (D) (Note: Appointed to the Senate on July 29, 1991)	Joe Kyrillos (R)	Joann H. Smith (R)
1992–1993	Joe Kyrillos (R)	Joseph Azzolina (R)	Joann H. Smith (R)
1994–1995	Joe Kyrillos (R)	Joseph Azzolina (R)	Joann H. Smith (R)
1996–1997	Joe Kyrillos (R)	Joseph Azzolina (R)	Joann H. Smith (R)
1998–1999	Joe Kyrillos (R)	Joseph Azzolina (R)	Samuel D. Thompson (R)
2000–2001	Joe Kyrillos (R)	Joseph Azzolina (R)	Samuel D. Thompson (R)
2002–2003	Joe Kyrillos (R)	Joseph Azzolina (R)	Samuel D. Thompson (R)
2004–2005	Joe Kyrillos (R)	Joseph Azzolina (R)	Samuel D. Thompson (R)
2006–2007	Joe Kyrillos (R)	Amy Handlin (R)	Samuel D. Thompson (R)
2008–2009	Joe Kyrillos (R)	Amy Handlin (R)	Samuel D. Thompson (R)
2010–2011	Joe Kyrillos (R)	Amy Handlin (R)	Samuel D. Thompson (R)
2012–2013	Joe Kyrillos (R)	Amy Handlin (R)	Declan O'Scanlon (R)
2014–2015	Joe Kyrillos (R)	Amy Handlin (R)	Declan O'Scanlon (R)
2016–2017	Joe Kyrillos (R)	Amy Handlin (R)	Declan O'Scanlon (R)
2018–2019	Declan O'Scanlon (R)	Amy Handlin (R)	Serena DiMaso (R)
2020–2021	Declan O'Scanlon (R)	Gerard Scharfenberger (R)	Serena DiMaso (R)
2022–2023	Declan O'Scanlon (R)	Gerard Scharfenberger (R)	Vicky Flynn (R)
2024–2025	Declan O'Scanlon (R)	Gerard Scharfenberger (R)	Vicky Flynn (R)
2026–2027	Declan O'Scanlon (R)	Gerard Scharfenberger (R)	Vicky Flynn (R)

== Election results, 1973–present ==
=== Senate ===
2021 New Jersey general election
Party	Candidate	Votes	%	±%
Republican	Declan O'Scanlon	53,599	61.4	▲6.3
Democratic	Vincent Solomeno III	33,627	38.6	▼6.3
Total votes		87,226	100.0	

New Jersey general election, 2017
Party	Candidate	Votes	%	±%
Republican	Declan O'Scanlon	34,976	55.1	▼13.0
Democratic	Sean F. Byrnes	28,493	44.9	▲14.3
Total votes		63,469	100.0	

New Jersey general election, 2013
Party	Candidate	Votes	%	±%
Republican	Joe Kyrillos Jr.	40,762	68.1	▲8.2
Democratic	Joseph Marques	18,289	30.6	▼6.1
The People's Choice	Mac Dara F. Lyden	774	1.3	▲0.7
Total votes		59,825	100.0	

2011 New Jersey general election
Party	Candidate	Votes	%
Republican	Joe Kyrillos, Jr.	24,121	59.9
Democratic	Christopher G. Cullen	14,785	36.7
Constitution	Stephen J. Boracchia	556	1.4
Keep Monmouth Green	Karen Anne Zaletel	519	1.3
Jobs-Economy-Honesty	Mac Dara F. Lyden	260	0.6
Total votes		40,241	100.0

2007 New Jersey general election
Party	Candidate	Votes	%	±%
Republican	Joe Kyrillos Jr	25,119	60.7	▲6.6
Democratic	Leonard L. Inzerillo	16,267	39.3	▼1.8
Total votes		41,386	100.0	

2003 New Jersey general election
Party	Candidate	Votes	%	±%
Republican	Joe Kyrillos Jr	23,459	54.1	▼10.3
Democratic	William E. Flynn	17,828	41.1	▲5.5
Green	Greg Orr	1,419	3.3	N/A
Conservative	Mac Dara Lyden	649	1.5	N/A
Total votes		43,355	100.0	

2001 New Jersey general election
Party	Candidate	Votes	%
Republican	Joe Kyrillos, Jr.	38,089	64.4
Democratic	Kiran Desai	21,066	35.6
Total votes		59,155	100.0

1997 New Jersey general election
Party	Candidate	Votes	%	±%
Republican	Joe Kyrillos, Jr.	36,047	63.2	▼0.8
Democratic	Mike Caffrey	19,733	34.6	▼1.4
Conservative	Jerome Bowe	1,299	2.3	N/A
Total votes		57,079	100.0	

1993 New Jersey general election
Party	Candidate	Votes	%	±%
Republican	Joseph M. Kyrillos, Jr.	40,140	64.0	▼3.8
Democratic	Patrick D. Healy	22,603	36.0	▲3.8
Total votes		62,743	100.0	

1991 New Jersey general election
Party	Candidate	Votes	%
Republican	Joseph M. Kyrillos	34,547	67.8
Democratic	James T. Phillips	16,437	32.2
Total votes		50,984	100.0

1987 New Jersey general election
Party	Candidate	Votes	%	±%
Democratic	Richard Van Wagner	24,155	51.0	▼3.1
Republican	Joseph Azzolina	23,244	49.0	▲3.1
Total votes		47,399	100.0	

1983 New Jersey general election
Party	Candidate	Votes	%	±%
Democratic	Richard Van Wagner	26,522	54.1	▲5.7
Republican	John P. Gallagher	22,508	45.9	▼5.7
Total votes		49,030	100.0	

1981 New Jersey general election
Party	Candidate	Votes	%
Republican	John P. Gallagher	27,988	51.6
Democratic	Eugene J. Bedell	26,268	48.4
Total votes		54,256	100.0

1977 New Jersey general election
Party	Candidate	Votes	%	±%
Democratic	Joseph P. Merlino	33,757	69.6	▼4.8
Republican	Harry L. Dearden	14,776	30.4	▲4.8
Total votes		48,533	100.0	

1973 New Jersey general election
Party	Candidate	Votes	%
Democratic	Joseph P. Merlino	34,826	74.4
Republican	Patrick J. Wilder	11,953	25.6
Total votes		46,779	100.0

=== General Assembly ===
2023 New Jersey general election
Party	Candidate	Votes	%	±%
Republican	Gerard P. Scharfenberger	30,474	28.6	▼2.2
Republican	Vicky Flynn	30,744	28.9	▼1.6
Democratic	Danielle Mastropiero	22,440	21.1	▲1.6
Democratic	Paul Eschelbach	21,655	20.3	▲0.9
Libertarian	John Morrison	1,241	1.2	NA
Total votes		106,554	100.0	

2021 New Jersey general election
Party	Candidate	Votes	%	±%
Republican	Gerard P. Scharfenberger	53,055	30.8	▲1.0
Republican	Vicky Flynn	52,525	30.5	▲1.3
Democratic	Allison Friedman	33,509	19.4	▼1.1
Democratic	Erin Howard	33,396	19.4	▼1.2
Total votes		172,485	100.0	

2019 New Jersey general election
Party	Candidate	Votes	%	±%
Republican	Gerard Scharfenberger	25,828	29.8	▲0.9
Republican	Serena DiMaso	25,297	29.2	▲1.7
Democratic	Barbara Singer	17,835	20.6	▼1.3
Democratic	Allison Friedman	17,763	20.5	▼0.9
Total votes		86,723	100.0	

New Jersey general election, 2017
Party	Candidate	Votes	%	±%
Republican	Amy Handlin	35,990	28.9	▼1.5
Republican	Serena DiMaso	34,214	27.5	▼1.6
Democratic	Tom Giaimo	27,212	21.9	▲2.1
Democratic	Mariel DiDato	26,640	21.4	▲1.8
Libertarian	Eveline H. Brownstein	458	0.4	N/A
Total votes		124,514	100.0	

New Jersey general election, 2015
Party	Candidate	Votes	%	±%
Republican	Amy Handlin	19,829	30.4	▼3.1
Republican	Declan O'Scanlon	18,977	29.1	▼3.4
Democratic	Thomas Herman	12,934	19.8	▲2.8
Democratic	Jeanne Cullinane	12,779	19.6	▲3.3
Jobs, Sidewalks, Transit	Joshua Leinsdorf	770	1.2	N/A
Total votes		65,289	100.0	

New Jersey general election, 2013
Party	Candidate	Votes	%	±%
Republican	Amy Handlin	38,795	33.5	▲3.0
Republican	Declan O'Scanlon	37,577	32.5	▲3.7
Democratic	Allison Friedman	19,623	17.0	▼2.4
Democratic	Matthew Morehead	18,843	16.3	▼2.9
Vote Green 13	Anne Zaletel	796	0.7	N/A
Total votes		115,634	100.0	

New Jersey general election, 2011
Party	Candidate	Votes	%
Republican	Amy H. Handlin	24,073	30.5
Republican	Declan O'Scanlon	22,754	28.8
Democratic	Patrick Short	15,333	19.4
Democratic	Kevin M. Lavan	15,165	19.2
Constitution	Frank C. Cottone	834	1.1
Constitution	William H. Lawton	757	1.0
Total votes		78,916	100.0

New Jersey general election, 2009
Party	Candidate	Votes	%	±%
Republican	Amy H. Handlin	39,998	32.9	▲4.3
Republican	Samuel D. Thompson	38,967	32.1	▲3.6
Democratic	Robert "Bob" Brown	20,371	16.8	▼4.0
Democratic	James Grenafege	18,769	15.4	▼6.7
Fight Corruption	Sean Dunne	3,388	2.8	N/A
Total votes		121,493	100.0	

New Jersey general election, 2007
Party	Candidate	Votes	%	±%
Republican	Amy H. Handlin	22,705	28.6	▲2.7
Republican	Samuel Thompson	22,576	28.5	▲2.6
Democratic	Patricia Walsh	17,502	22.1	▼0.7
Democratic	Robert "Bob" Brown	16,505	20.8	▼1.1
Total votes		79,288	100.0	

New Jersey general election, 2005
Party	Candidate	Votes	%	±%
Republican	Amy Handlin	29,405	25.9	▲1.8
Republican	Samuel D. Thompson	29,326	25.9	▲1.5
Democratic	William E. Flynn	25,814	22.8	▼1.0
Democratic	Michael Dasaro	24,824	21.9	▼1.1
Green	Mike Hall	2,061	1.8	▼0.6
Green	Greg Orr	1,899	1.7	▼0.6
Total votes		113,329	100.0	

New Jersey general election, 2003
Party	Candidate	Votes	%	±%
Republican	Samuel D. Thompson	20,378	24.4	▼3.3
Republican	Joe Azzolina	20,125	24.1	▼4.8
Democratic	Leonard Inzerillo	19,881	23.8	▲1.7
Democratic	Thomas Perry	19,178	23.0	▲2.7
Green	Mike W. Hall	2,002	2.4	N/A
Green	Jaime Donnelly	1,896	2.3	N/A
Total votes		83,460	100.0	

New Jersey general election, 2001
Party	Candidate	Votes	%
Republican	Joe Azzolina	33,777	28.9
Republican	Samuel D. Thompson	32,397	27.7
Democratic	Kevin Graham	25,851	22.1
Democratic	Steven T. Piech	23,741	20.3
Libertarian	Diane Hittner	874	0.7
We, The People	Mac Dara F.X. Lyden	422	0.4
Total votes		117,062	100.0

New Jersey general election, 1999
Party	Candidate	Votes	%	±%
Republican	Joe Azzolina	18,758	28.1	▼2.5
Republican	Sam Thompson	17,307	25.9	▼1.2
Democratic	Patrick M. Gillespie	15,020	22.5	▲2.5
Democratic	Alex R. DeSevo	14,015	21.0	▲1.4
Conservative	Sylvia Kuzmak	820	1.2	▼0.1
Conservative	Louis A. Novellino	807	1.2	▼0.2
Total votes		66,727	100.0	

New Jersey general election, 1997
Party	Candidate	Votes	%	±%
Republican	Joe Azzolina	33,976	30.6	▲5.1
Republican	Sam Thompson	30,108	27.1	▲1.9
Democratic	Dennis M. Maher	22,162	20.0	▼3.1
Democratic	Nicholas Minutolo	21,712	19.6	▼1.8
Conservative	Leonard T. Skoblar	1,504	1.4	▼1.1
Conservative	Sylvia Kuzmak	1,456	1.3	▼1.0
Total votes		110,918	100.0	

New Jersey general election, 1995
Party	Candidate	Votes	%	±%
Republican	Joe Azzolina	20,103	25.5	▼4.3
Republican	Joann H. Smith	19,887	25.2	▼5.4
Democratic	Patrick M. Gillespie	18,178	23.1	▲3.4
Democratic	Mike Spaeth	16,885	21.4	▲2.3
Conservative	Nick Lombardi	1,947	2.5	N/A
Conservative	Jerome Bowe	1,812	2.3	N/A
Total votes		78,812	100.0	

New Jersey general election, 1993
Party	Candidate	Votes	%	±%
Republican	Joann H. Smith	37,489	30.6	▼2.3
Republican	Joseph Azzolina	36,497	29.8	▼1.3
Democratic	Sara B. Stewart	24,095	19.7	▲1.1
Democratic	Edward Testino	23,407	19.1	▲1.7
Independents 4 Change	Louis J. Barbarino	976	0.8	N/A
Total votes		122,464	100.0	

1991 New Jersey general election
Party	Candidate	Votes	%
Republican	Joann H. Smith	32,907	32.9
Republican	Joseph Azzolina	31,131	31.1
Democratic	Kathleen B. Olsen	18,576	18.6
Democratic	Robert H. Murray	17,447	17.4
Total votes		100,061	100.0

1989 New Jersey general election
Party	Candidate	Votes	%	±%
Republican	Joseph M. Kyrillos, Jr.	31,934	27.9	▲1.9
Republican	Joann H. Smith	30,259	26.4	▼0.2
Democratic	Richard A. Cooper	26,391	23.0	▼0.7
Democratic	Irvin B. Beaver	25,700	22.4	▼1.3
Libertarian	Claudia Montelione	345	0.3	N/A
Total votes		114,629	100.0	

1987 New Jersey general election
Party	Candidate	Votes	%	±%
Republican	Joann H. Smith	24,641	26.6	▲0.9
Republican	Joseph M. Kyrillos, Jr.	24,109	26.0	▼0.3
Democratic	William E. Flynn	22,013	23.7	▼0.5
Democratic	Jacqueline Walker	21,976	23.7	▼0.1
Total votes		92,739	100.0	

1985 New Jersey general election
Party	Candidate	Votes	%	±%
Republican	Joseph Azzolina	26,565	26.3	▲2.5
Republican	Joann H. Smith	25,970	25.7	▲4.1
Democratic	William E. Flynn	24,418	24.2	▼3.6
Democratic	Jacqueline Walker	24,058	23.8	▼3.0
Total votes		101,011	100.0	

New Jersey general election, 1983
Party	Candidate	Votes	%	±%
Democratic	William E. Flynn	26,125	27.8	▲1.4
Democratic	Jacqueline Walker	25,187	26.8	▼0.6
Republican	Thomas J. Powers	22,346	23.8	▲0.9
Republican	Herbert J. Kupfer	20,294	21.6	▼0.9
Total votes		93,952	100.0	

New Jersey general election, 1981
Party	Candidate	Votes	%
Democratic	Richard Van Wagner	29,294	27.4
Democratic	William E. Flynn	28,210	26.4
Republican	Rita M. Graham	24,430	22.9
Republican	Willard L. King	24,067	22.5
Citizens	David I. Thieke	405	0.4
Citizens	David G. Smullen	332	0.3
Total votes		106,738	100.0

New Jersey general election, 1979
Party	Candidate	Votes	%	±%
Democratic	Francis J. McManimon	29,275	37.6	▼0.6
Democratic	Gerald Stockman	24,788	31.8	▼1.0
Republican	Michael Angarone	12,173	15.6	▲1.6
Republican	Lee J. Millas	10,391	13.3	▲0.1
Dedicated Hard-Working	Paul B. Rizzo	726	0.9	N/A
U.S. Labor	Susan W. Bowen	526	0.7	0.0
Total votes		77,879	100.0	

Special election, November 7, 1978
Party	Candidate	Votes	%
Democratic	Gerald R. Stockman	23,842	62.4
Republican	Mario D. Rossetti	13,782	36.1
U.S. Labor	Susan W. Bowen	573	1.5
Total votes		38,197	100.0

New Jersey general election, 1977
Party	Candidate	Votes	%	±%
Democratic	Francis J. McManimon	35,831	38.2	▲3.8
Democratic	Helen Chiarello Szabo	30,809	32.8	▲3.1
Republican	David A. Wriggins	13,149	14.0	▼2.6
Republican	Robert E. Otto	12,369	13.2	▼3.3
Aid Mental Illness	Nellie Battaglia	663	0.7	N/A
U.S. Labor	Susan W. Bowen	660	0.7	▼0.1
U.S. Labor	Chris Schmid	426	0.5	N/A
Total votes		93,907	100.0	

Special election, November 2, 1976
Party	Candidate	Votes	%
Democratic	Helen Chiarello Szabo	33,535	55.6
Republican	Carmen J. Armenti	26,755	44.4
Total votes		60,290	100.0

New Jersey general election, 1975
Party	Candidate	Votes	%	±%
Democratic	Francis J. McManimon	31,302	34.4	▼3.6
Democratic	S. Howard Woodson, Jr.	27,025	29.7	▼2.7
Republican	Jay G. Destribats	15,113	16.6	▲0.2
Republican	Richard J. Harrison	14,981	16.5	▲3.3
Legalize Acupuncture Now	Philip L. Kaplan	1,739	1.9	N/A
U.S. Labor	Elliot Greenspan	728	0.8	N/A
Total votes		90,888	100.0	

New Jersey general election, 1973
Party	Candidate	Votes	%
Democratic	Francis J. McManimon	34,348	38.0
Democratic	S. Howard Woodson, Jr.	29,226	32.4
Republican	Harry L. Dearden	14,820	16.4
Republican	Russell L. Wilbert	11,945	13.2
Total votes		90,339	100.0

== Election results, 1965–1973 ==
=== Senate ===
1965 New Jersey general election
Party	Candidate	Votes	%
Democratic	Ned J. Parsekian	174,438	14.1
Democratic	Matthew Feldman	159,236	12.9
Democratic	Jeremiah F. O'Connor	156,888	12.7
Democratic	Alfred W. Kiefer	152,844	12.4
Republican	Peter Moraites	148,092	12.0
Republican	Marion West Higgins	148,035	12.0
Republican	Arthur W. Vervaet	144,890	11.7
Republican	Nelson G. Gross	143,532	11.6
Conservative	Thomas J. Moriarty	4,408	0.4
Fusion	Louis Berns	1,256	0.1
Total votes		1,233,619	100.0

1967 New Jersey general election
Party	Candidate	Votes	%
Republican	Fairleigh Dickinson, Jr.	191,260	13.1
Republican	Joseph C. Woodcock, Jr.	177,982	12.2
Republican	Alfred D. Schiaffo	172,420	11.8
Republican	Garrett W. Hagedorn	171,596	11.8
Republican	Willard B. Knowlton	167,379	11.5
Democratic	Ned J. Parsekian	117,609	8.1
Democratic	Matthew Feldman	114,760	7.9
Democratic	Jeremiah F. O'Connor	113,888	7.8
Democratic	Gerald A. Calabrese	105,450	7.2
Democratic	Alfred W. Kiefer	104,869	7.2
Conservative	William Craig Kennedy	4,950	0.3
Conservative	Thomas J. Moriarty	4,724	0.3
Conservative	John J. Murray	4,402	0.3
Conservative	Irving F. Kent	4,172	0.3
Conservative	Frank Monte	4,154	0.3
Total votes		1,459,615	100.0

1971 New Jersey general election
Party	Candidate	Votes	%
Republican	Harold C. Hollenbeck	158,615	11.3
Republican	Joseph C. Woodcock, Jr.	157,280	11.2
Republican	Garrett W. Hagedorn	153,203	10.9
Republican	Alfred D. Schiaffo	151,806	10.8
Republican	Frederick E. Wendel	150,962	10.8
Democratic	John J. McCarthy	128,109	9.1
Democratic	Raymond Garramone	125,154	8.9
Democratic	Alfred W. Kiefer	124,083	8.8
Democratic	Sidney Aglow	123,857	8.8
Democratic	Lee M. Carlton	119,262	8.5
Nobody’s Rubber Stamp	Willard B. Knowlton	11,668	0.8
Total votes		1,403,999	100.0

=== General Assembly ===
==== District 13A ====
New Jersey general election, 1967
Party	Candidate	Votes	%
Republican	Harold C. Hollenbeck	34,171	29.5
Republican	Peter J. Russo	33,763	29.1
Democratic	Doris Mahalick	24,059	20.8
Democratic	Vincent P. Rigolosi	23,859	20.6
Total votes		115,852	100.0

New Jersey general election, 1969
Party	Candidate	Votes	%
Republican	Harold C. Hollenbeck	35,650	28.9
Republican	Peter J. Russo	34,927	28.3
Democratic	James D. Checki, Jr.	26,928	21.9
Democratic	Carl Persak	25,725	20.9
Total votes		123,230	100.0

New Jersey general election, 1971
Party	Candidate	Votes	%
Republican	Peter J. Russo	31,906	26.4
Republican	Harold A. Pareti	30,789	25.5
Democratic	Anthony Scardino, Jr.	30,371	25.1
Democratic	Thomas J. Sherlock	27,892	23.1
Total votes		120,958	100.0

==== District 13B ====
New Jersey general election, 1967
Party	Candidate	Votes	%
Republican	Thomas Costa	35,439	29.5
Republican	Austin N. Volk	35,038	29.2
Democratic	Arnold E. Brown	25,295	21.1
Democratic	Vito A. Albanese	24,221	20.2
Total votes		119,993	100.0

New Jersey general election, 1969
Party	Candidate	Votes	%
Republican	Thomas Costa	39,338	28.9
Republican	William J. Dorgan	38,997	28.6
Democratic	Martin T. Durkin	29,443	21.6
Democratic	Ernest Allen Cohen	28,489	20.9
Total votes		136,267	100.0

New Jersey general election, 1971
Party	Candidate	Votes	%
Democratic	Byron M. Baer	33,174	26.3
Democratic	Albert Burstein	32,847	26.0
Republican	Charles J. O'Dowd, Jr.	30,512	24.2
Republican	Kenith D. Bloom	29,717	23.5
Total votes		126,250	100.0

==== District 13C ====
New Jersey general election, 1967
Party	Candidate	Votes	%
Republican	William M. Crane	30,170	29.9
Republican	Michael J. Ferrara	29,939	29.7
Democratic	John A. Conte	20,552	20.4
Democratic	John M. Skevin	20,242	20.1
Total votes		100,903	100.0

New Jersey general election, 1969
Party	Candidate	Votes	%
Republican	Richard J. Vander Plaat	36,155	29.0
Republican	William M. Crane	35,098	28.1
Democratic	John A. Conte	26,735	21.4
Democratic	Clifford G. Steele	26,002	20.9
National Conservative	Gertrude E. Unsel	713	0.6
Total votes		124,703	100.0

New Jersey general election, 1971
Party	Candidate	Votes	%
Republican	C. Gus Rys	30,714	29.1
Republican	John A. Spizziri	29,416	27.8
Democratic	Anthony Spataro	22,850	21.6
Democratic	Marjorie A. Wyngaarden	22,670	21.5
Total votes		105,650	100.0

==== District 13D ====
New Jersey general election, 1967
Party	Candidate	Votes	%
Republican	Peter Moraites	37,957	31.2
Republican	Harry Randall, Jr.	37,147	30.5
Democratic	Jerome L. Yesko	23,208	19.1
Democratic	Lee M. Carlton	22,375	18.4
Youth; Responsibility; Progress	Michael Ford Rehill	917	0.8
Total votes		121,604	100.0

New Jersey general election, 1969
Party	Candidate	Votes	%
Republican	Peter Moraites	51,528	35.8
Republican	Richard W. De Korte	51,273	35.7
Democratic	Angelo M. D'Alessandro	20,487	14.2
Democratic	Claire Edelman	19,744	13.7
National Conservative	Stanley Polak	748	0.5
Total votes		143,780	100.0

New Jersey general election, 1971
Party	Candidate	Votes	%
Republican	Charles E. Reid	33,453	31.9
Republican	Richard W. DeKorte	33,205	31.7
Democratic	Walter J. Coleman	19,422	18.5
Democratic	Leopold A. Monaco	18,672	17.8
Total votes		104,752	100.0

==== District 13E ====
New Jersey general election, 1967
Party	Candidate	Votes	%
Republican	Richard J. Vander Plaat	43,814	36.1
Republican	Richard W. DeKorte	42,606	35.1
Democratic	Robert E. Hamer	19,367	15.9
Democratic	John J. Coan	15,692	12.9
Total votes		121,479	100.0

New Jersey general election, 1969
Party	Candidate	Votes	%
Republican	Austin N. Volk	37,150	30.3
Republican	Edward A. Connell	36,871	30.0
Democratic	Lee M. Carlton	24,409	19.9
Democratic	Vincente K. Tibbs	23,631	19.3
National Conservative	Hannibal Cundari	671	0.5
Total votes		122,732	100.0

New Jersey general election, 1971
Party	Candidate	Votes	%
Republican	Robert C. Veit	25,720	25.4
Democratic	Edward H. Hynes	25,483	25.19
Republican	Franklin H. Cooper	25,424	25.13
Democratic	Joseph Ringelstein	24,553	24.3
Total votes		101,180	100.0
