= Garrett W. Hagedorn =

American politician

Member of the New Jersey Senate
- In office 1968 – August 9, 1985
- Preceded by: Ned Parkesian; Matthew Feldman; Jeremiah F. O'Connor; Alfred Kiefer
- Succeeded by: Henry McNamara
- Constituency: 13th district (1968–74); 40th district (1974–85)

Mayor of Midland Park, New Jersey
- In office 1958–1967

Member of the Midland Park Borough Council
- In office 1951–1957

Personal details
- Born: September 16, 1910 Midland Park, New Jersey
- Died: August 9, 1985 (aged 74) Belfast, Maine
- Party: Republican

Garrett W. Hagedorn (September 16, 1910 – August 9, 1985) was an American Republican Party politician who served in the New Jersey Senate, where he represented the 40th Legislative District from 1968 until his death.

Born and raised in Midland Park, Hagedorn attended the schools of the Eastern Christian School Association, then in Paterson, New Jersey.

== Elective office ==
Hagedorn served on the Midland Park Borough Council from 1951 to 1957. He was sworn in as mayor on January 5, 1958, and served in that position until 1967.

From 1968 through 1973, Hagorden was one of five senators elected at-large from the 13th Legislative District, which covered all of Bergen County.

In the wake of the 1964 Supreme Court decision Reynolds v. Sims, which required the creation of state legislature districts as equal in population as possible, the 1973 elections were the first with a 40-district map, in which Hagedorn became part of the 40th Legislative District.

In the State Senate, Hagedorn was an advocate for efforts to address child abuse. Hagedorn sponsored legislation that created the New Jersey Department of Corrections and the New Jersey Department of Human Services from the Department of Institutions and Agencies.

While in the State Senate, he served as Minority Leader during the Governorship of Brendan Byrne.

He died of a heart attack on August 9, 1985, while on vacation in Belfast, Maine.

In the November 1985 general election, Republican Henry McNamara was elected to serve the two years remaining on Hagedorn's term of office.

== Legacy ==
The New Jersey General Assembly and Senate passed bills in September 1985 which were signed into law in January 1986 renaming the Glen Gardner Center for Geriatrics, the state's primary facility for medical and psychiatric care for senior citizens, as the Senator Garrett W. Hagedorn Center for Geriatrics. In July 2011, Governor of New Jersey Chris Christie announced that the 310-bed facility in Glen Gardner, which had been renamed as the Senator Garrett W. Hagedorn Psychiatric Hospital, would be closed in 2012 as part of an effort to save $9 million a year in expenses.

New Jersey Senate
Preceded by Ned Parsekian; Matthew Feldman; Jeremiah F. O'Connor; Alfred Kiefer	Member of the New Jersey Senate from the 13th district 1968–1974; Served alongside: Fairleigh Dickinson Jr., Joseph C. Woodcock, Alfred D. Schiaffo, Willard B. Knowlton, Harold C. Hollenbeck, Frederick E. Wendel	Succeeded by Joseph P. Merlino
Preceded by Constituency established	Member of the New Jersey Senate from the 40th district 1974–1985	Succeeded by Henry McNamara
Preceded by James Cafiero	Minority Leader of the New Jersey Senate; 1978–1980	Succeeded by Barry T. Parker
