= Peter Moraites =

American politician

155th Speaker of the New Jersey General Assembly
- In office 1969–1969
- Preceded by: Albert S. Smith
- Succeeded by: William K. Dickey

Member of the New Jersey General Assembly
- In office 1962–1966
- Preceded by: Walter Jones
- Succeeded by: Arnold E. Brown
- Constituency: Bergen County
- In office 1968–1971
- Preceded by: Arnold E. Brown
- Succeeded by: Edward H. Hynes
- Constituency: District 13 (Bergen)

Personal details
- Born: Peter Moraites; June 8, 1922 North Carolina
- Died: January 7, 2014 (aged 91)
- Party: Republican
- Spouse: Helen Moraites
- Education: St. John's College

Peter Moraites (June 8, 1922 – January 7, 2014; pronounced mo-RAY-tees) was an American Republican Party politician who served as Speaker of the New Jersey General Assembly in 1969.

== Early life ==
Moraites was born June 8, 1922, in North Carolina. He was a graduate of St. John's College and St. John's University School of Law. He served as a Secretary to Congressman Jacob K. Javits (R-New York); after Javits was elected Attorney General of New York in 1954, Moraites became his Special Assistant. He later served as an assistant to Congressman Frank C. Osmers, Jr. (R-New Jersey). In the 1950s, before moving to New Jersey, he ran unsuccessfully for a seat in the New York State Senate.

== New Jersey General Assembly ==
Moraites was elected Assemblyman from Bergen County in 1961, He was re-elected in 1963.

== Candidate for State Senator ==
After the U.S. Supreme Court, in Reynolds v. Sims (more commonly known as One Man, One Vote), required redistricting by state legislatures for congressional districts to keep represented populations equal, as well as requiring both houses of state legislatures to have districts drawn that contained roughly equal populations, and to perform redistricting when needed. Because of its population, Bergen County gained a three Senate seats. Moriates chose to run for the State Senate.

A deep split among Bergen County Republicans intensified in 1963 when incumbent Senator, Pierce H. Deamer, Jr. and former State Senator Walter H. Jones faced off in an election for Bergen County Republican Chairman. Jones won, and by 1965, Deamer found himself dumped from the Bergen County Republican Organization line. Jones backed Moraites for Senate and put him on a ticket with Assembly Speaker Marion West Higgins, and former Assemblymen Nelson G. Gross and Arthur Vervaet. Deamer ran on an insurgent ticket with Assemblymen Richard Vander Plaat and Harry Randall, Jr., and former Assemblyman Carmine Savino. Jones' slate won decisively, with Moraites finishing second.

Candidate	Office	Votes
Marion West Higgins	Incumbent Assembly Speaker	33769
Peter Moraites	Incumbent Assemblyman	32,214
Nelson G. Gross	Former Assemblyman	31,220
Arthur Vervaet	Former Assemblyman	30,759
Pierce H. Deamer, Jr.	Incumbent State Senator	20,240
Richard Vander Plaat	Incumbent Assemblyman	20,211
Harry Randall, Jr.	Incumbent Assemblyman	17,971
John J. Breen	Attorney	3,195

With popular Democratic Governor Richard J. Hughes running for re-election, Democrats Ned Parsekian, Matthew Feldman, Jeremiah F. O'Connor, and Alfred Kiefer won the four Bergen County State Senate seats. Moraites was the top vote-getter among the Republicans, finishing 4,752 votes behind Kiefer.

== Return to the New Jersey General Assembly ==
He ran again for Assemblyman in 1967 and won. He was re-elected to a fourth term in the State Assembly in 1969.

== Candidate for Congress ==
In 1968, Moraites was the Republican candidate for the U.S. House of Representatives against three-term Democrat Henry Helstoski, but narrowly lost by 2,332 votes, 51%-49%.

== Indictments ==
In 1970, Moraites was indicted on bank fraud charges. He was later convicted, and served nine months of a 16-month sentence at the Federal Correctional Institution in Danbury, Connecticut. Moraites and Jones were indicted on bank fraud charges in 1971; he was acquitted of those charges three years later.

While he was in prison, he and another prominent Bergen County political figure associated with the bank, Walter H. Jones, were indicted on charges of trying to conceal unsecured loans made by the bank to shipping companies three years earlier. A judge acquitted them in February 1974 after a non-jury trial.

== Later life ==
After prison, Moraites regained his law license and practiced in New York City until retiring in 2002. He lived in Alpine. His wife, Helen, died in October, 2013.
