= Arnold E. Brown =

American politician (born 1932)

- Born: April 21, 1932 (age 93); Englewood, New Jersey, U.S.
- Education: Bowling Green University, Rutgers University Law School

Arnold E. Brown (born April 21, 1932) is an American Democratic Party politician who became the first African American elected to represent Bergen County, New Jersey in the New Jersey Legislature, when was elected in 1965 to serve in the New Jersey General Assembly.

== Early life and career ==
Brown was born in Englewood, New Jersey, on April 21, 1932, the son of John Scott Brown Jr. and Hortense Melle Stubbs. He graduated from Dwight Morrow High School in Englewood in 1949, and from Bowling Green University in 1954. He received a law degree from Rutgers University Law School in 1957. He practiced law in Englewood from 1957 to 1986. In 1985, Brown founded the Du Bois Book Center in Englewood, which specializes in African American Studies and Black Studies. He is the author of Black Loyalists in Bergen County and the Book of Negroes in the Revolutionary War in Bergen County, and the Co-Author of Images of America: Englewood and Englewood Cliffs. He married Lydia Barbara White in 1955; following her death, he married Gwendolyn Wertby. He has four children: Crystal L. Brown, Beverly M. Brown-Fitzhugh, Dale E. Brown-Davis and Arnold E. Brown II.

== New Jersey State Assemblyman ==
In 1961, at age 29, Brown made his first bid for public office as a candidate for the New Jersey General Assembly. He sought one of seven Bergen County seats, all elected countywide at-large. He faced Republicans Harry Randall Jr., Marion West Higgins, Carmine Savino Jr., Nelson G. Gross, Joseph C. Woodcock Jr., F. Walton Wanner, and Peter Moraites. Brown ran with Democrats Richard A. Kohler, Emil Starr, M. J. DiMaria, Marc Joseph, Arthur L. McHale, and Carmen Rusignola. Republicans swept all seven seats. Although he lost by more than 41,000 votes, Brown was the top vote getter among the Democratic candidates.

Brown made a second bid for the Legislature in 1965, a more favorable year for Democrats with popular Governor Richard J. Hughes heading the ticket. He ran with six other Democrats: Vito Albanese, Lee M. Carlton, Robert E. Hamer, Jerome L. Yesko, John Skevin, and Stephen J. Moses. Brown was elected, running more than 19,000 votes ahead of Republican R. Parker Birkins. Democrats won six of seven seats, with only Woodcock winning.

During his two years as an Assemblyman, Brown's legislative aide was Byron Baer, who later served more than 30 years in the legislature.

Brown sought re-election to a second term in 1967, which turned out to be a heavily Republican year statewide. Running in a newly created legislative district 13B, Brown and his running mate, Assemblyman Vito Albanese, were defeated by Teaneck Mayor Thomas Costa and Englewood Mayor Austin Volk. Costa received 35,439 votes, followed by Volk (35,038), Brown (25,295) and Albanese (24,221).
