= Senator Woodcock =

Senator Woodcock may refer to:

- Chandler Woodcock (fl. 2000s), Maine State Senate
- Joseph C. Woodcock (1925–1997), New Jersey State Senate
