= Arthur Vervaet =

American politician

Arthur W. (Bud) Vervaet, Jr. (July 10, 1913 – November 20, 1999) was an American Republican politician who served four terms in the New Jersey General Assembly.

Born in Pompton Lakes, New Jersey, Vervaet graduated from Butler High School in 1931 and from the University of Notre Dame in 1936. He served in the U.S. Army during World War II. He was employed by W.R. Grace and Company, and later worked for Vervaet Woven Label, a New Jersey–based family business.

He was elected councilman in Oakland, New Jersey, in 1950, and served as mayor of Oakland from 1952 to 1953. He was elected to the New Jersey General Assembly in 1951, and was re-elected in 1953, 1955 and 1957. He was elected to the Bergen County, New Jersey Board of Chosen Freeholders in 1958 and resigned his Assembly seat after taking office in 1959. He was re-elected as Freeholder in 1961. In 1965, Vervaet became a candidate for the New Jersey State Senate. Backed by the Republican County Chairman, Walter H. Jones, he won a hotly contested Republican Primary in which the incumbent Senator, Pierce H. Deamer Jr., was defeated for renomination. Vervaet received 10,519 more votes than Deamer. But Vervaet lost the General Election in what turned out to be a heavily Democratic year. He trailed Alfred Kiefer by nearly 8,000 votes. He was married to Dorothy Ryerson MacEvoy Vervaet (1921–1973) and had three children: Gay, Alden, and Karen.

== 1965 Republican Primary for State Senator - Bergen County - Four Seats ==
| Candidate | Office | Votes |
|---|---|---|
| Marion West Higgins | Incumbent Assembly Speaker | 33769 |
| Peter Moraites | Incumbent Assemblyman | 32,214 |
| Nelson G. Gross | Former Assemblyman | 31,220 |
| Arthur Vervaet | Former Assemblyman | 30,759 |
| Pierce H. Deamer, Jr. | Incumbent State Senator | 20,240 |
| Richard Vander Plaat | Incumbent Assemblyman | 20,211 |
| Harry Randall, Jr. | Incumbent Assemblyman | 17,971 |
| John J. Breen | Attorney | 3,195 |
