= Marion Higgins =

Marion Higgins may refer to:

- Marion Higgins (supercentenarian) (1893–2006), American supercentenarian
- Marion West Higgins (1915–1991), first female Speaker of the New Jersey General Assembly
