= Fairleigh Dickinson Jr. =

American politician and businessman

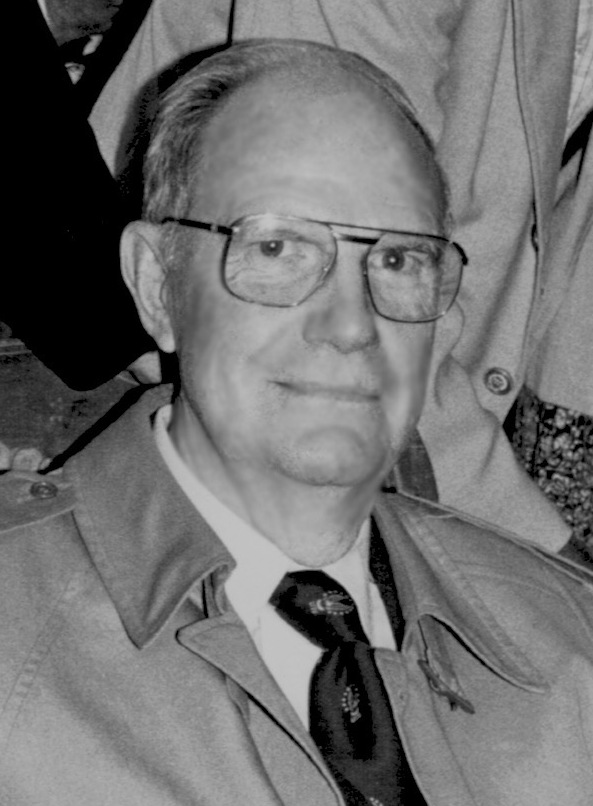
- F.S. Dickinson in 1993

Member of the New Jersey Senate from Bergen County
- In office 1968–1971 Serving with Joseph C. Woodcock, Alfred D. Schiaffo, Garrett W. Hagedorn, and Willard B. Knowlton
- Preceded by: Ned J. Parsekian; Matthew Feldman; Jeremiah F. O'Connor; Alfred W. Kiefer
- Succeeded by: Frederick Wendel

Personal details
- Born: December 9, 1919 Rutherford, New Jersey
- Died: October 12, 1996 (aged 76) Boston, Massachusetts
- Party: Republican
- Parents: Fairleigh S. Dickinson (father); Grace Smith Dickinson (mother)
- Education: Montclair Kimberley Academy; New York Military Academy; Williams College

Fairleigh Stanton Dickinson Jr. (December 9, 1919 – October 12, 1996) was an American Republican Party politician who served as a member of the New Jersey Senate from 1968 to 1971.

== Early life and education ==
He was born in Rutherford, the son of Fairleigh S. Dickinson and Grace Smith Dickinson (1887–1973). A 1937 graduate of Montclair Kimberley Academy, Dickinson was recognized by the school in 1965 with its Outstanding Alumnus Award. Dickinson graduated from New York Military Academy and from Williams College. He served as a lieutenant commander in the United States Coast Guard during World War II. He was able to draw upon his Coast Guard experience when he and his wife were forced into a lifeboat when the cruise liner Prinsendam caught fire and sank while traversing the Gulf of Alaska in October 1980.

Dickinson sponsored the 1969 legislation that created the Hackensack Meadowlands Development Commission.

== Career ==
Dickinson became a trustee of Fairleigh Dickinson University in 1948 and was named its chairman in 1968, following in the footsteps of his father, Fairleigh S. Dickinson, who was co-founder of Becton Dickinson, a manufacturer of medical products, and of Fairleigh Dickinson University. Dickinson also followed his father in commerce, as president of Becton Dickinson in 1948 and chairman in 1972.

He had homes on Martha's Vineyard and in Ridgewood, New Jersey and was at his home on Martha's Vineyard when he became sick and later died at Brigham and Women's Hospital in Boston.

As a founding board member of Vineyard Environmental Research, Institute (VERI), Dickinson played an active role in saving three Martha's Vineyard lighthouses (Gay Head Light, East Chop Light, and Edgartown Harbor Light) from being torn down in the early 1980s. The Edgartown Harbor Light, which is located near the Dickinsons' Martha's Vineyard home, is highly visible from the Dickinsons' living room and ocean-side deck, and always held a special interest to Dickinson and his family. In 1987 Dickinson became Lighthouse Keeper to the Edgartown Harbor Light. Dickinson was a co-founder of Vineyard Environmental Research, Inst.

He married Betty Harrington (1920–2010) in 1946, and they had one son and two daughters; Ann, of Ridgewood, New Jersey, and Tracy, of Park Ridge, New Jersey. In 1969, his son, Fairleigh S. Dickinson III, died of a drug overdose in his room at Columbia University, where he was a freshman. Ann's son is the Broadway actor David Turner (b. 1974).
