= Ned J. Parsekian =

Politician from New Jersey, US (1921-2028)

Ned J. Parsekian (August 29, 1921 – June 9, 2008) was an American lawyer and politician who headed the New Jersey Motor Vehicle Commission and served in the New Jersey Senate, representing Bergen County, New Jersey.

The son of immigrants who escaped the Armenian Genocide, Parsekian was born in Springfield, Massachusetts, on August 29, 1921. He attended New York University and then served as a pilot in the United States Army Air Force before using the GI Bill to earn degrees at Columbia University and Columbia Law School.

In January 1959, he was sworn in on an acting basis and nominated to head the New Jersey Motor Vehicle Commission by Governor of New Jersey Robert B. Meyner. For years, Walter H. Jones of Bergen County blocked the nomination. Parsekian served as acting director for three years until Pierce H. Deamer Jr. consented to the nomination. Senators had objected to his confirmation because he vigorously opposed the widespread practice of state senators fixing motor vehicle tickets. Then a resident of Flemington, New Jersey, Parsekian resigned from his position in May 1964.

Governor Richard J. Hughes nominated Parsekian to the New Jersey Superior Court in August 1964, but Deamer refused to sign off and the nomination was withdrawn.

A resident of Ridgewood, New Jersey, Parsekian was one of four Democrats elected in 1965 to represent the 13th Senatorial District in the New Jersey Senate, alongside Matthew Feldman, Alfred Kiefer and Jeremiah F. O'Connor. Parsekian and Assemblyman Vito Albanese introduced legislation in June 1966 that would eliminate the Borough of Teterboro and divide it up into four adjacent municipalities. Parsekian lost his re-election bid in 1967, as Republicans swept all five seats.

He died in Sarasota, Florida, on June 8, 2008.
