= Joann H. Smith =

American politician (1934–1998)

Member of the New Jersey General Assembly from the 13th district
- In office January 14, 1986 – January 13, 1998 Serving with Joseph Azzolina; Joe Kyrillos
- Preceded by: Bill Flynn; Jacqueline Walker
- Succeeded by: Samuel D. Thompson

Personal details
- Born: Joann H. Belkowski; May 12, 1934 Perth Amboy, New Jersey
- Died: May 18, 1998 (aged 64) Old Bridge Township, New Jersey
- Party: Republican
- Spouse: James D. Smith Sr.
- Children: 3

Joann H. Smith (May 12, 1934 - May 18, 1998) was an American politician who served in the New Jersey General Assembly from the 13th Legislative District from 1986 to 1998.

== Early life ==
Born and raised in Perth Amboy, as Joann H. Belkowski, she was a 1952 graduate of Perth Amboy High School, and attended McDowell School of Design and Douglass College.

She married James D. Smith Sr. in 1955.

She was a teacher at the Middlesex County Vocational and Technical Schools for twelve years. In 1972, Smith entered the banking field, and was a community reinvestment officer with Amboy Madison National Bank.

An Old Bridge Township member of the Middlesex County Republican Executive Committee from 1961 until her death, Joann Smith had also served as vice chair and recording secretary of the Old Bridge Republican Organization.

Smith served on the Old Bridge Township Zoning Board, and was a founder of the Old Bridge Economic development Corporation. In 1981 she was elected as a Republican to a four-year term on the Old Bridge Township Council, however this term was cut short as a result of the township's change from council–manager government to mayor–council government. Forced in 1983 to run for a new, four-year term under the new form of government, Smith was narrowly defeated for one of three at-large seats.

== New Jersey General Assembly ==
In the 1985 general election, Joann H. Smith and Joseph Azzolina were elected to the New Jersey General Assembly, defeating incumbent Democrats Bill Flynn and Jacqueline Walker. Smith served six, two-year terms in the General Assembly. She had served as a Deputy Speaker, and was a member of the Appropriations Committee.

In the Assembly, Smith opposed Governor James Florio's $2.8 billion tax increase, as well as the governor's ban on assault weapons. She was instrumental in obtaining funds for the redesign and reconstruction of the intersection of U. S. Route 9 and Ernston Road in Middlesex County.

Having served six consecutive terms, Smith announced that she would not seek reelection in 1997. Samuel D. Thompson was nominated as her successor. Prior to the end of her term, Smith was taken ill, and was unable to attend any remaining legislative sessions.

Smith died on May 18, 1998. Interment was in Rosedale Memorial Park, Linden, New Jersey.

=== Committees ===
- Appropriations
- Housing

== Joann H. Smith Memorial Highway ==
By Joint Resolution No. 4, approved September 14, 1998, the New Jersey Legislature designated "that portion of State Highway Route No. 9, which is situated in the Township of Old Bridge, Middlesex County, as the 'Joann H. Smith Memorial Highway.'"
