= Amy Handlin =

American politician

Member of the New Jersey General Assembly from the 13th district
- In office January 10, 2006 – January 14, 2020 Serving with Samuel D. Thompson; Declan O'Scanlon; Serena DiMaso
- Preceded by: Joseph Azzolina
- Succeeded by: Gerard Scharfenberger

Deputy Minority Leader of the New Jersey General Assembly
- In office 2007 – January 14, 2020
- Leader: Alex DeCroce; Jon Bramnick
- Preceded by: Office Established

Member of the Monmouth County Board of Chosen Freeholders
- In office January 1, 1990 – January 10, 2006
- Succeeded by: Anna C. Little

Personal details
- Born: January 28, 1956 (age 70)
- Party: Republican
- Spouse: David Handlin
- Children: Two
- Education: Harvard University (BA); Columbia University (MBA); New York University (PhD)
- Website: Legislative Website

Amy H. Handlin (born January 28, 1956) is an American Republican Party politician who served in the General Assembly, where she represented the 13th Legislative District from 2006 to 2020.

== Education and career ==
Handlin earned a B.A. in 1977 from Harvard University, an MBA from Columbia University in 1979, and a Ph.D. in Marketing from New York University in 1991. She was an associate professor of marketing at Monmouth University until her retirement in 2019 and was also a senior fellow at the Center for the Study of Public Issues.

== Monmouth County Politics ==
Handlin was elected to the Monmouth County Board of Chosen Freeholders in 1989 and re-elected in 1992, 1995, 1998, 2001 and 2004. Previously, she served as deputy mayor and township committeewoman in Middletown Township. Handlin is a former commissioner on the New Jersey State Commission on Higher Education and chair of Monmouth County's Communities Against Tobacco Coalition. Named 2003 Elected Official of the Year by the Northern Monmouth Chamber of Commerce, she has also been honored by the American Cancer Society of New Jersey, Prevention First, 180:Turning Lives Around and many other public health organizations for her work to reduce teen smoking. Handlin has also served on the boards of the New Jersey League of Women Voters and the American Association of University Women, among others. She is a past recipient of the Legislative Award of the New Jersey Environmental Federation, the Humanitarian Award of Brandeis University Women, the Rose and Scroll Award of the New Jersey Association of Women Business Owners, and numerous other citations for civic leadership. Handlin, the author of the 1998 book Whatever Happened to the Year of the Woman? Why Women Still Aren't Making It to the Top in Politics, and the books Be Your Own Lobbyist, (Praeger, 2010) and Government Grief (Praeger 2011). She has also been a columnist for the New Jersey Reporter, a public-affairs magazine. A founding member and former chair of the Monmouth County Advisory Commission on Women, Handlin is a member of the national board of the Jewish Council for Public Affairs and vice president of community relations for the Jewish Federation of Greater Monmouth County. A past chair of the Central Jersey Israel EXPO, she has also co-chaired the United Jewish Communities' Northeast Leadership Conference.

== New Jersey Assembly ==
Handlin ran against fellow Republican Joseph Azzolina whom she defeated in the June 2005 GOP primary. Handlin was one of the main proponents of the ban enacted in 2007 on consumption of alcohol in the PNC Bank Arts Center parking lots. After incumbent 13th District Senator Joe Kyrillos announced he would not seek re-election in 2017, Handlin initially intended to run for his seat, putting her into a contested primary with fellow Assembly member Declan O'Scanlon. However, Handlin ultimately dropped her Senate bid, and instead ran for re-election to her Assembly seat, which she retained in the general election.

For the 2019 general election, Handlin announced she would not run for another term and was retiring from the Assembly. Her current term concluded in 2020 and she was succeeded by Republican Gerard Scharfenberger.

=== Committees ===
- Higher Education
- Regulated Professions

== Personal life ==
Handlin resides in Middletown Township, where she lives with husband David, son Daniel and daughter Rebecca.

== Electoral history ==
=== Assembly ===
New Jersey general election, 2017
Party	Candidate	Votes	%	±%
Republican	Amy Handlin	35,990	28.9	▼1.5
Republican	Serena DiMaso	34,214	27.5	▼1.6
Democratic	Tom Giaimo	27,212	21.9	▲2.1
Democratic	Mariel DiDato	26,640	21.4	▲1.8
Libertarian	Eveline H. Brownstein	458	0.4	N/A
Total votes		'124,514'	'100.0'	

New Jersey general election, 2015
Party	Candidate	Votes	%	±%
Republican	Amy Handlin	19,829	30.4	▼3.1
Republican	Declan O'Scanlon	18,977	29.1	▼3.4
Democratic	Thomas Herman	12,934	19.8	▲2.8
Democratic	Jeanne Cullinane	12,779	19.6	▲3.3
Jobs, Sidewalks, Transit	Joshua Leinsdorf	770	1.2	N/A
Total votes		'65,289'	'100.0'	

New Jersey general election, 2013
Party	Candidate	Votes	%	±%
Republican	Amy Handlin	38,795	33.5	▲3.0
Republican	Declan O'Scanlon	37,577	32.5	▲3.7
Democratic	Allison Friedman	19,623	17.0	▼2.4
Democratic	Matthew Morehead	18,843	16.3	▼2.9
Vote Green 13	Anne Zaletel	796	0.7	N/A
Total votes		'115,634'	'100.0'	

New Jersey general election, 2011
Party	Candidate	Votes	%
Republican	Amy Handlin	24,073	30.5
Republican	Declan O'Scanlon	22,754	28.8
Democratic	Patrick Short	15,333	19.4
Democratic	Kevin M. Lavan	15,165	19.2
Constitution	Frank C. Cottone	834	1.1
Constitution	William H. Lawton	757	1.0
Total votes		78,916	100.0

New Jersey general election, 2009
Party	Candidate	Votes	%	±%
Republican	Amy H. Handlin	39,998	32.9	▲4.3
Republican	Samuel D. Thompson	38,967	32.1	▲3.6
Democratic	Robert "Bob" Brown	20,371	16.8	▼4.0
Democratic	James Grenafege	18,769	15.4	▼6.7
Fight Corruption	Sean Dunne	3,388	2.8	N/A
Total votes		'121,493'	'100.0'	

New Jersey general election, 2007
Party	Candidate	Votes	%	±%
Republican	Amy H. Handlin	22,705	28.6	▲2.7
Republican	Samuel Thompson	22,576	28.5	▲2.6
Democratic	Patricia Walsh	17,502	22.1	▼0.7
Democratic	Robert "Bob" Brown	16,505	20.8	▼1.1
Total votes		'79,288'	'100.0'	

New Jersey general election, 2005
Party	Candidate	Votes	%	±%
Republican	Amy Handlin	29,405	25.9	▲1.8
Republican	Samuel D. Thompson	29,326	25.9	▲1.5
Democratic	William E. Flynn	25,814	22.8	▼1.0
Democratic	Michael Dasaro	24,824	21.9	▼1.1
Green	Mike Hall	2,061	1.8	▼0.6
Green	Greg Orr	1,899	1.7	▼0.6
Total votes		'113,329'	'100.0'	

New Jersey General Assembly
Preceded by Joseph Azzolina	Member of the New Jersey General Assembly for the 13th District; January 10, 2006 – January 14, 2020; With: Samuel D. Thompson, Declan O'Scanlon	Succeeded by Gerard Scharfenberger
Political offices
Preceded by ?	Monmouth County at-large Freeholder; January 1, 1990 – January 10, 2006	Succeeded by Anna C. Little
