= New Jersey Election Law Revision Commission =

Former 1960s and 1970s governmental panel

The New Jersey Election Law Revision Commission (ELRC) was a bipartisan panel established in 1964 to review all of the state's election laws and recommend ways to modernize them. New Jersey's election laws had not been overhauled since 1930. The ELRC eventually produced (1) an Initial Report in 1965 recommending the elimination of paper ballots, (2) an Interim Report in 1970 recommending reforms for campaign finance laws, and (3) a Final Report in 1975 recommending a comprehensive set of reforms to curb corruption by reducing complexity and centralizing oversight under an independent, bipartisan agency. Faced with political fallout from Watergate in 1974 and the conviction of several officials in NJ Governor William T. Cahill's administration in 1973, lawmakers reformed NJ's campaign finance laws, drawing on the 1970 Interim Report recommendations. However, when the Final Report's broader recommendations for modernizing the state's election laws were introduced in the General Assembly on April 21, 1975; lawmakers took no action. The bill failed to clear committee.

Former state senator William E. Schluter (Republican, former ELRC member) wrote in 2017, "Despite recommendations made by the Election Law Revision Commission in its 1975 report, and by numerous good government groups over the years, almost no serious measures for reform have been adopted into law....The New Jersey legislature seems intent on maintaining the status quo so that the system will continue to produce for the benefit of those who manage it."

Nearly 60 years earlier, the Courier-Post Editorial Board made a similar observation, "Adoption of a modern and workable election code is improbable unless the public demands it. Current practices and procedure serve the purposes of politicians too well to be altered without a struggle."

== Milestones ==
- 1953 - The NJ Legislature passes Joint Resolution No. 14, creating an "Election Laws Study Commission" to determine how the state's election laws could be "simplified, correlated, and revised". The non-partisan panel produces a "Preliminary Report" calling for mandatory voting machines in all counties and the establishment of an elections enforcement board.
- 1961 - Assemblyman Raymond Bateman (Republican) introduces a bill calling for an overhaul of NJ election laws and establishing the ELRC. Governor Richard Hughes (Democrat) signs the Election Law Revision Commission Act (The Act - Chapter 81) into law. However, by 1963 the ELRC has no members and has made no recommendations.
- 1964 - Assembly Majority Leader Marion West Higgins (Republican) and Assemblyman Raymond Bateman (now Assistant Majority Leader) sponsor a bill to repeal and replace the 1961 Act. Signed into law, the Election Law Revision Commission Act (The Act - Chapter 29) restructures the ELRC.
- 1965 - The ELRC delivers its first recommendation, urging the legislature to mandate voting machines in all counties. The Assembly passes a voting-machine bill in 1965, but the Senate fails to approve it.
- 1966 and 1967 -The ELRC repeats its call for mandatory voting machines. Once again, the Legislature fails to act. Since the ELRC views mandatory voting machines as essential to any future reform measures, they produce no further recommendations.
- 1970 - Raymond Bateman (now State Senate President) introduces a bill to reorganize the ELRC, but called for an "Interim Report" on campaign finance reform. Governor William T. Cahill signs the bill into law but resulting legislation dies in committee.
- 1973 - William E. Schluter (State Senator and ELRC member, Republican) introduces a revised bill (S-1124). The New Jersey Campaign Contributions and Expenditures Act (The Act - Chapter 83) revises NJ's campaign finance laws and establishes the NJ Election Law Enforcement Commission for independent oversight.
- 1975 - ELRC Chairman William J. Dorgan (former Assemblyman, Republican) delivers the Final Report. A bill to implement the commission's recommendations (A.3334) is introduced in the Assembly but fails to clear committee. The report covers 10 areas:
  1. Electoral Supervision and Control (centralizing elections under the NJ Election Law Enforcement Commission, the independent agency established in 1973)
  2. Financial Disclosures (aligning with prior campaign reform measures enacted in 1973)
  3. Party Organization
  4. The Right of Franchise
  5. Voting Systems and the Problems of Paper Ballots
  6. Election Recounts
  7. Expenses (for the administration of elections)
  8. Presidential Ballot Law (aligning with the Federal Voting Rights Act)
  9. Absentee Ballot Law
  10. Penalties (for violation of election laws)
- 1978 - Governor Brenden Byrne (Democrat) disbands the ELRC.

== History ==
1953 - Preceding the ELRC. In August 1953, the NJ Legislature issued Joint Resolution No.14, establishing the New Jersey Election Laws Study Commission (ELSC). The resolution specified that a nine-member panel would review NJ's election laws — many of which "are contradictory, repetitious, and some of them are outmoded and unnecessary"— and deliver recommendations for modernizing NJ's election laws by January 1954. The committee held its first meeting in February 1954.

- In the November 1954 election, NJ officials struggled with a statewide recount for a close US senate race. The state's recount rules only addressed paper ballots — but twelve of NJ's 21 counties now used voting machines instead of paper ballots.
- The ELSC delivered its Preliminary Report, Volume 1 in January 1955 urging the legislators to install voting machines in all counties, standardize voting machine processes across the state, and establish a 5-member bipartisan election-law enforcement board.
- Two additions to the Preliminary Report (Volume 2 in 1956 and Volume 3 in1957) also urged mandatory use of voting machines and establishment of a state board of elections. Lawmakers failed to act on the recommendations.

1961 - Overhauling Election Laws. Republican NJ Assemblyman Raymond H. Bateman introduced a bill creating a commission to review all of the state's election laws, Signed into law, the act called for a bipartisan panel to review NJ's election laws and propose recommendations for overhauling them; the report was due by the 1963 legislative session.

- The ELRC was first established in the political aftermath of Nixon's close loss to JFK in the 1960 presidential election.
- Many Republicans claimed voter fraud was to blame. Recounts were held in multiple states, including five New Jersey counties.
- Bateman called NJ's election laws "a horrible mass of aged inconsistencies, contradictions, and legal phrases which can be interpreted to meet any need."
- However by 1963, the Commission had failed to produce any recommendations or deliver a final report. At that point, the committee had no members and had never met.

1964 - Ending Paper Ballots. Going into the 1964 primary, lawmakers faced a new technical challenge with voting machines. The machines could not accommodate an unusually large number of nominees for Democratic Convention delegates. Legislative debates, bills, and court challenges ensued: should counties with voting machines be required to use paper ballots or should they be required to purchase costly adapters for the machines? Ultimately a compromise was reached allowing the 15 of 21 counties that used voting machines to conduct Republican primaries with voting machines and to substitute paper ballots for Democrats. After the primary election, lawmakers took action, repealing and replacing the 1961 Act with the 1964 Act.

- The 1964 law created a new structure for the ELRC but with a mandate that was similar to the 1953 joint resolution and the 1961 Act; develop recommendations to overhaul the state's election laws and deliver a final report by the 1965 legislative session.
- The new ELRC added an independent secretary position filled by Samuel Alito, Sr., Director of NJ's nonpartisan Office of Legislative Services (also father of future Supreme Court Justice Samuel Alito).
- Other notable members included Vice-Chairman Donald G. Herzberg, Director of the Eagleton Institute of Politics at Rutgers University.

In 1965, the ELRC issued its first recommendation: Voting machines should be mandatory in all 21 counties.

- Six counties (8% of the state's registered voters) still used paper ballots. The ELRC claimed they increased the likelihood of voter fraud ("stuffing the ballot box") and increased ELRC review work by 25%.
- The 1966 Assembly passed a bill ending the use of paper ballots but the bill failed to clear committee in the State Senate.

In 1967, the ELRC continued to push for voting machines as the first step for overhauling the NJ election laws, pausing its work until the decision was settled.

- With the ELRC stalled, Democrats introduced a number of individual reform measures--including voter registration and campaign finance bills--effectively bypassing the ELRC.
- The 1967 Assembly passed another voting-machine bill. The Senate was expected to pass it this time but ultimately blocked the vote.

1970 - Addressing Campaign Finance - Outgoing Governor Hughes signed a law repealing the 1930 campaign finance caps retroactively. Before leaving office, Hughes urged incoming Governor Cahill to pursue campaign finance reform.

- In the absence of any substantive reforms, the 1969 election was still governed by NJ's 1930 legislation, including outdated campaign expenditure maximums. Major parties now routinely ignored the irrelevant caps. Accordingly, both of the major party gubernatorial candidates in 1969 exceeded the 1930 caps. A third-party candidate decided to test the laws and take them to court.
- After the 1969 election, State Senate President Raymond Bateman introduced a bill that called for the ELRC to recommend revisions for campaign funding and expenditures by April 1, 1970.

The ELRC was reorganized and focused on Campaign Finance Reform.

- The Governor, Senate President, and Assembly Majority Leader each appointed four members; two from each major party
- The 12-member group worked through the summer and Chairman Irwin I. Kimmelman delivered the Interim Report in September, 1970.
- In January 1971, Assemblyman (and ELRC member) William E. Schluter introduced legislation to enact the recommendations . The bill was blocked by the Assembly Committee for Revision and Amendment of Laws.
- In 1972, Schluter became a State Senator and sponsored a similar bill. That bill was held up by the Senate Judiciary Committee but finally passed — after the November general election.

By 1973, as the Watergate scandal continued to unfold, several members of Governor Cahill's administration faced charges of corruption, driving Cahill and the Legislature to act.

- The Assembly approved the Senate version of Senator Schluter's Campaign Finance & Expenditures bill in April, 1973.
- Consistent with the Interim Report, the new law called for stringent disclosures along with the establishment of the NJ Election Law Enforcement Commission, a 4 member independent and bipartisan board for campaign finance oversight.
- Going against the Interim Report recommendations, the final law set maximums on campaign finance, resulting in more confusion and complexity.
- When Cahill was sworn in in 1970, Republicans held control of both houses of the state legislature. In 1974, Cahill lost his primary bid for re-election, Democrat Brenden Byrne was sworn in, and Democrats captured majorities in both houses — and would continue to hold control for the next decade.

1975 - Delivering Recommendations for Comprehensive Reform.

- Prior to publishing the Final Report, details were previewed and discussed in the press starting in December, 1974.
- In addition to modernizing and simplifying NJ election laws, the ELRC's recommendations were also intended to reduce the control of party bosses over political candidates and government officials:
  - Centralize all election matters under an independent agency, the bipartisan NJ Election Law Enforcement Commission
  - Remove responsibilities for elections falling under the NJ Secretary of State (a political appointee) and reduce county-level control to voter registration and ballot counting duties
  - Eliminate county-level "Superintendent of Elections" roles and remove County Clerks from the electoral process

In March 1975, the ELRC published its "Final Report to the Governor and Legislature".

- Democratic Assemblymen Albert Burstein, John P. Doyle, Edward H. Hynes, Charles D. Worthington, and Steven P. Perskie introduced A.3334, a bill to replace Title 19 with Title 19A — enacting the ELRC recommendations.
- The bill went to the Committee on State Government, Federal, and Interstate Relations.
- The bill died in committee. No hearings were held but county-level officials pushed back against centralization.

1977 - Resurrecting the Election Law Reform Bill.

- Assemblyman Albert Burstein introduced A.3324, known as Title 19A, a bill based on the ELRC Final Report.
- The NJ League of Women Voters endorsed the new legislation in an op-ed from the Fair Lawn, NJ chapter president.
- The Secretary of State and county officials continued to push back against Title 19A, despite an endorsement from Governor Brenden Byrne.
- As recommended by the ELRC in 1975, Governor Brenden Byrne disbanded the ELRC in 1978.

== Commission members ==
1965 - First Recommendation (Voting Machines)

- Chairwoman - Marion West Higgins (Assembly Majority Leader - R)
- Secretary - Samuel Alito, Sr. (Director, NJ Office of Legislative Affairs, father of Supreme Court Associate Justice Samuel Alito, Jr.)
- Donald Bigley (Assemblyman - D)
- Mark Ferber (D)
- Benjamin Franklin III (R)
- William Gellner (D)
- Donald G. Herzberg (Director, Eagleton Institute - D)
- Thorn Lord (Democratic State Chairman)
- John A. Lynch (State Senator - D)
- Katherine K. Neuberger (Republican National Committeewoman)
- Helen T. Ross (R)
- Nelson F. Stamler (State Senator - R)
- Webster B. Todd (Republican State Chairman, father of NJ Governor Christine Todd Whitman)

1970 - Interim Report (Campaign Finance)

- Chairman - Irwin I. Kimmelman (former Assemblyman - R)
- Secretary - Samuel Alito, Sr. (Director, NJ Office of Legislative Affairs, father of Supreme Court Associate Justice Samuel Alito, Jr.)
- John P. Doyle (Assemblyman - D)
- Thomas J. Fallon (Camden County, County Clerk)
- John F. Gerry (Partner; Wallace, Douglass & Gerry; Camden - R)
- Donald G. Herzberg (Eagleton Institute - D)
- Joseph Hirkala (State Senator - D)
- John A. Lynch (State Senator - D)
- Katherine K. Neuberger (Republican National Committeewoman)
- Lawrence R. Olson (Somerset County, County Clerk)
- William E. Schluter (Assemblyman - R)
- Willis R. Walling (Morris County Chairman - R)

1975 - Final Report (Comprehensive Reform)

- Chairman - William J. Dorgan (former Assemblyman - R)
- Secretary - Samuel Alito, Sr. (Director, NJ Office of Legislative Affairs, father of Supreme Court Associate Justice Samuel Alito, Jr.)
- Albert Burstein (Assemblyman - D)
- John N. Dennis (Assemblyman - R)
- John A. Lynch (State Senator - D)
- Katherine K. Neuberger (Republican National Committeewoman)
- Lawrence R. Olson (Somerset County, County Clerk)
- William E. Schluter (State Senator - R)
- Willis R. Walling (Morris County Chairman - R)
