= Samuel D. Thompson =

Member of the New Jersey Senate

Sam Thompson

Member of the New Jersey Senate from the 12th district
- In office January 10, 2012 – January 9, 2024
- Preceded by: Jennifer Beck
- Succeeded by: Owen Henry

Member of the New Jersey General Assembly from the 13th district
- In office January 13, 1998 – January 10, 2012
- Preceded by: Joann H. Smith
- Succeeded by: Declan O'Scanlon

Personal details
- Born: July 31, 1935 (age 91) Mobile, Alabama, U.S.
- Party: Democratic (2023–present); Republican (until 2023)
- Spouse: Jacqueline Thompson
- Children: 3
- Education: University of Arkansas (BS); Louisiana State University (PhD)
- Website: Legislative Website

Samuel D. Thompson (born July 31, 1935) is an American politician and scientist who served in the New Jersey Senate from 2012 to 2024, representing the 12th Legislative district. Before redistricting in 2011, he served in the General Assembly from 1998 to 2012, representing the 13th district.

Thompson was first elected as a Republican, but facing a difficult primary over his age, he switched parties in February 2023 and said he would seek re-election as a Democrat. He however reversed his decision and announced on February 27, that he would not run for re-election. His party switch increased the Democratic State Senate majority to 25-15.

== Early life ==
Thompson was born in Mobile, Alabama and attended public schools in Alabama, Louisiana, and Arkansas. He reached the rank of Specialist Third Class while serving in the U.S. Army from 1955 through 1957. He received a B.S. in 1960 from the University of Arkansas in chemistry and mathematics and was awarded a PhD in 1965 from Louisiana State University in physical chemistry. He worked as a research chemist at duPont and J.P. Stevens and Company and was employed by the New Jersey Department of Health from 1972 to 1994 as a chemist and director of clinical laboratory improvement service. He served on the United States Armed Forces Epidemiological Board from 1983 to 1990. He was appointed by then Governor of New Jersey Christine Todd Whitman to serve on the Governor's Education Task Force in 1994 as Co-Chair. He served on the New Jersey Turnpike Authority from 1994 to 1997 as director of communications and formerly as director of planning, analysis, and government relations. Thompson has served on the New Jersey Advisory Council on Elder Care since 1998, the Continuing Care Advisory Council from 1998 to 2002, and the New Jersey State Council for Adult Literacy Services from 2000 to 2002. He is married to the former Jacqueline P. Haycock, and they live in Old Bridge Township, New Jersey.

== Early political career ==
Thompson was chair of the Middlesex County Republican Organization from 1987 until 1994 and was a delegate to every Republican National Convention from 1988 through 2012.

== New Jersey Assembly ==
Thompson was first elected to the General Assembly in 1997 in the northern Monmouth County and northeastern Middlesex County-based 13th district. He served as the Assistant Republican Assembly Leader from 2004 to 2005. He served in the Assembly on the Appropriations Committee and the Human Services Committee.

== New Jersey Senate ==
=== Elections ===
==== 2011 election ====
Following the reapportionment of the legislative districts for the 2010 Census, Thompson's hometown of Old Bridge was moved to the new 12th district, which was spread across the counties of Burlington, Ocean, Monmouth, and Middlesex. The four Republican county committees endorsed Thompson to be the Senator from the new district and was elected in the 2011 general election defeating Democrat Robert "Bob" Brown.

==== 2017 election ====
Thompson defeated challenger Art Haney in the June 3, 2021 primary and Democrat David Lande in the general election.

=== Tenure ===
He sat on three Senate committees (Budget and Appropriations, Environment and Energy, and State Government, Wagering, Tourism & Historic Preservation) and two joint committees (Housing Affordability and Public Schools). In May 2017, Thompson introduced a bill to designate Streptomyces griseus as New Jersey's State Microbe, to be added to the state's other state symbols. S. griseus was chosen for this honor because it is a New Jersey native that made unique contributions to healthcare and scientific research worldwide. A strain of S. griseus that produced the antibiotic streptomycin was discovered in New Jersey in 1916 and developed into an antibiotic by a Rutgers University team by Albert Schatz and Selman Waksman in 1943. A companion bill was introduced in the Assembly in June 2017 by Annette Quijano. During the 2019 budget fight, Democrats passed a budget without Governor Phil Murphy's millionaires tax. Thompson was one of six Republicans to vote for the budget.

=== Committees ===
- Joint Committee on Housing Affordability
- Joint Committee on the Public Schools
- Budget and Appropriations
- Education
- State Government, Wagering, Tourism & Historic Preservation

=== District 12 ===
Each of the 40 districts in the New Jersey Legislature has one representative in the New Jersey Senate and two members in the New Jersey General Assembly. The representatives from the 12th District for the 2022—23 Legislative Session were:

- Senator Samuel D. Thompson (D)
- Assemblyman Robert D. Clifton (R)
- Assemblyman Alex Sauickie (R)

== Electoral history ==
=== Senate ===
12th Legislative District General Election, 2021
Party	Candidate	Votes	%
Republican	Samuel D. Thompson (incumbent)	46,897	64.94
Democratic	Joseph Altomonte	25,321	35.06
Total votes		72,218	100.0
Republican hold			

New Jersey general election, 2017
Party	Candidate	Votes	%	±%
Republican	Sam Thompson	30,013	56.7	▼8.7
Democratic	David H. Lande	21,888	41.4	▲6.8
Coach Kev	Kevin Antoine	990	1.9	N/A
Total votes		'52,891'	'100.0'	

New Jersey State Senate elections, 2013
Party	Candidate	Votes	%
Republican	Sam Thompson (incumbent)	32,911	65.4
Democratic	Raymond D. Dothard	17,440	34.6
Republican hold			

New Jersey State Senate elections, 2011
Party	Candidate	Votes	%
Republican	Samuel D. Thompson	22,578	59.9
Democratic	Robert "Bob" Brown	15,125	40.1
Republican hold			

=== Assembly ===
New Jersey general election, 2009
Party	Candidate	Votes	%	±%
Republican	Amy H. Handlin	39,998	32.9	▲4.3
Republican	Samuel D. Thompson	38,967	32.1	▲3.6
Democratic	Robert "Bob" Brown	20,371	16.8	▼4.0
Democratic	James Grenafege	18,769	15.4	▼6.7
Fight Corruption	Sean Dunne	3,388	2.8	N/A
Total votes		'121,493'	'100.0'	

New Jersey general election, 2007
Party	Candidate	Votes	%	±%
Republican	Amy H. Handlin	22,705	28.6	▲2.7
Republican	Samuel Thompson	22,576	28.5	▲2.6
Democratic	Patricia Walsh	17,502	22.1	▼0.7
Democratic	Robert "Bob" Brown	16,505	20.8	▼1.1
Total votes		'79,288'	'100.0'	

New Jersey general election, 2005
Party	Candidate	Votes	%	±%
Republican	Amy Handlin	29,405	25.9	▲1.8
Republican	Samuel D. Thompson	29,326	25.9	▲1.5
Democratic	William E. Flynn	25,814	22.8	▼1.0
Democratic	Michael Dasaro	24,824	21.9	▼1.1
Green	Mike Hall	2,061	1.8	▼0.6
Green	Greg Orr	1,899	1.7	▼0.6
Total votes		'113,329'	'100.0'	

New Jersey general election, 2003
Party	Candidate	Votes	%	±%
Republican	Samuel D. Thompson	20,378	24.4	▼3.3
Republican	Joe Azzolina	20,125	24.1	▼4.8
Democratic	Leonard Inzerillo	19,881	23.8	▲1.7
Democratic	Thomas Perry	19,178	23.0	▲2.7
Green	Mike W. Hall	2,002	2.4	N/A
Green	Jaime Donnelly	1,896	2.3	N/A
Total votes		'83,460'	'100.0'	

New Jersey general election, 2001
Party	Candidate	Votes	%
Republican	Joe Azzolina	33,777	28.9
Republican	Samuel D. Thompson	32,397	27.7
Democratic	Kevin Graham	25,851	22.1
Democratic	Steven T. Piech	23,741	20.3
Libertarian	Diane Hittner	874	0.7
We, The People	Mac Dara F.X. Lyden	422	0.4
Total votes		117,062	100.0

New Jersey general election, 1999
Party	Candidate	Votes	%	±%
Republican	Joe Azzolina	18,758	28.1	▼2.5
Republican	Sam Thompson	17,307	25.9	▼1.2
Democratic	Patrick M. Gillespie	15,020	22.5	▲2.5
Democratic	Alex R. DeSevo	14,015	21.0	▲1.4
Conservative	Sylvia Kuzmak	820	1.2	▼0.1
Conservative	Louis A. Novellino	807	1.2	▼0.2
Total votes		'66,727'	'100.0'	

New Jersey general election, 1997
Party	Candidate	Votes	%	±%
Republican	Joe Azzolina	33,976	30.6	▲5.1
Republican	Sam Thompson	30,108	27.1	▲1.9
Democratic	Dennis M. Maher	22,162	20.0	▼3.1
Democratic	Nicholas Minutolo	21,712	19.6	▼1.8
Conservative	Leonard T. Skoblar	1,504	1.4	▼1.1
Conservative	Sylvia Kuzmak	1,456	1.3	▼1.0
Total votes		'110,918'	'100.0'	

New Jersey Senate
Preceded by Jennifer Beck	Member of the New Jersey Senate for the 12th District; January 10, 2012 – January 9, 2024	Succeeded by Owen Henry
New Jersey General Assembly
Preceded by Joann H. Smith	Member of the New Jersey General Assembly for the 13th District; January 13, 1998 – January 10, 2012; With: Joseph Azzolina, Amy Handlin	Succeeded by Declan O'Scanlon
