= Gerald R. Stockman =

American attorney and politician (born 1935)

Member of the New Jersey Senate from the 15th district
- In office January 12, 1982 – January 14, 1992
- Preceded by: Wayne Dumont
- Succeeded by: Dick LaRossa

Member of the New Jersey General Assembly from the 13th district
- In office November 13, 1978 – January 12, 1982
- Preceded by: Helen Chiarello Szabo
- Succeeded by: Bill Flynn; Richard Van Wagner

Personal details
- Born: March 31, 1935 (age 91) Trenton, New Jersey, U.S.
- Party: Democratic
- Education: College of the Holy Cross (BA); Villanova University (LLB)

Gerald R. Stockman (born March 31, 1935) is an American attorney and politician who served 10 years in the New Jersey Senate, from 1982 to 1992, where he represented the 15th Legislative District.

== Biography ==
Stockman earned his undergraduate degree from the College of the Holy Cross in 1956 and received his law degree from the Villanova University School of Law in 1959. He was a law clerk for United States federal judges Thomas James Clary in Pennsylvania and Judge Thomas M. Madden in New Jersey.

After Helen Chiarello Szabo stepped down from her Assembly seat representing the 13th Legislative District to become the superintendent of elections in Mercer County, Stockman defeated Republican Mario D. Rossetti in a November 1978 special election for the balance of the term of office.

Stockman was elected to the New Jersey Senate in 1981 to a two-year term of office, succeeding Wayne Dumont, who had been moved out of the 15th district in redistricting following the 1980 United States census. He was re-elected to four-year terms of office in both 1983 and 1987. Stockman lost his 1991 re-election bid to Republican Dick LaRossa by a 50.9–49.1% margin. Democrats had the goal of regaining some of the seats lost in the 1991 Republican landslide and Stockman challenged LaRossa for a second time in 1993, with the incumbent receiving endorsements from the AFL–CIO, locals of the Communications Workers of America and the New Jersey State Patrolmen's Benevolent Association. Stockman lost to LaRossa again in 1993, this time by a margin of 52.3% to 47.7%.

Stockman supported legislation enabling fair housing in New Jersey under the Mount Laurel doctrine, stating in 1984 that there are "two unequal societies in the state – urban and suburban", earning for him recognition by The New York Times as "one of the Legislature's strongest open-housing advocates". A bill proposed by Stockman in 1988 would cushion the impact of revaluation on local homeowners on their property taxes by phasing in the increased tax burden over a three-year period, with the State of New Jersey covering any shortfalls to the municipality.

Following his departure from elected office, Stockman was an attorney in private practice for many years in Hamilton Township and Lawrence Township, Mercer County, New Jersey.
