= Jacqueline Walker =

American politician

Member of the New Jersey General Assembly from the 13th district
- In office January 10, 1984 – January 14, 1986 Serving with Bill Flynn
- Preceded by: Richard Van Wagner
- Succeeded by: Joseph Azzolina; Joann H. Smith

Personal details
- Born: November 7, 1941 (age 84) Jersey City, New Jersey, U.S.
- Party: Democratic

Jacqueline Walker (born November 7, 1941) is an American Democratic Party politician who served in the New Jersey General Assembly from the 13th Legislative District from 1984 to 1986.

Born in Jersey City, New Jersey, Wilson grew up in West New York, where she attended Memorial High School. She earned an undergraduate and master's degree at Jersey City State College (now New Jersey City University) and studied further at Teachers College, Columbia University. A resident of Matawan, her victory in the 1983 election was her first run for elective office.
