= Austin Volk =

American politician (1918–2010)

Austin Nicholas Volk (December 28, 1918 – September 18, 2010) was an American businessman and politician from New Jersey. A member of the Republican Party, Volk served as the Mayor of Englewood, and in the New Jersey State Assembly for two terms during his political career.

== Biography ==
=== Early life ===
Volk was born at Englewood Hospital in Englewood, New Jersey on December 28, 1918, to Nicholas and Helen Volk. He graduated from Dwight Morrow High School in Englewood in 1937.

Volk graduated from Brown University, where he became a cadet in the U.S. Naval Reserve Officer Training Program and a Delta Kappa Epsilon member. Volk served in the United States Navy during both World War II and the Korean War, reaching the rank of captain. During World War II, Volk participated at the Battle of Guadalcanal in the Solomon Islands as the commanding officer of a landing craft. Volk is credited with discovering the Brown Bear River in the Solomon Islands and naming it after Brown University during the war.

Volk returned to New Jersey following the end of World War II. He began working at Nicholas Volk and Co., his family's insurance office in New York City.

He remained a member of the U.S. Naval Reserve and was recalled to active duty during the Korean War. Volk became a logistical support team commander during the Korean War. He once again returned to his family's insurance business after the Korean War. He would later retire from the United States Navy in 1965, having reached the rank of captain.

Volk owned an insurance business and was mayor of Englewood, New Jersey from 1960 to 1963 and 1966 to 1970. He later served two terms in the New Jersey General Assembly.

=== Political career ===
Volk was elected to two nonconsecutive terms as mayor of Englewood, New Jersey, during the 1960s. He served his first term from 1960 until 1963. The city of Englewood was ordered to desegregate its public school system during his first term. He was elected to a second, nonconsecutive term in 1965, taking office in January 1965.

The 1967 Newark riots, which lasted from July 12–17, 1967, broke out in Newark, New Jersey, which is located south of Englewood. On July 21, days after the end of Newark's violence, unrest broke out in Englewood's 4th Ward, a predominantly African American section of Englewood. African Americans had complained of substandard, slum housing and police neglect in the otherwise affluent city. The Englewood unrest, which lasted for five days. included instances of rock throwing, broken windows and one example of gunfire. Several police officers and residents were injured. At one stage of the troubles, he used a helicopter to direct the police.

Volk, who was 17 months into his second term at the time of the unrest, agreed to meet with African American leaders and ministers to discuss their grievances during the Englewood riots. He vowed to demolish slum properties in the 4th Ward and increase career prospects for residents. Volk also condemned the violence in Englewood committed by some rioters.

At one point during the unrest, Volk wore his Navy uniform as he walked down Palisade Avenue in the 4th Ward with Englewood police and fire fighters. Volk felt that walking with the police and fire fighters would project stability and the need to negotiate the end to the riots. After the riots he appointed a community relations committee to help defuse racial tensions by integrating classes in five elementary schools. However, his actions and use of the police were questioned by some African American leaders. Arnold Brown, who was serving as the first African American state assemblyman from Bergen County at the time, felt that Volk "elevated the situation" through the heavy use of police in remarks about Volk in 2010. Brown explained that, "We had our differences in the '60s... He was just a conservative looking for the status quo."

In the fall of 1967, Volk was defeated in his bid for a third term by his Democratic opponent. Democrats also gained the majority of seats on the Englewood City Council in the election. Volk left office in January 1968.

Volk was elected to the New Jersey State Assembly in 1970 representing the 37th Legislative District. He served two terms in the Assembly. Volk retired from the insurance industry in the late 2000s.

=== Later life ===
Volk married the former Rae P. Glidden in 1979. Glidden was the widow of John C. Glidden, who had served as the president of the Englewood City Council. The couple remained together until her death in 2009.

Austin Volk died at his home in Southampton, New York, on September 18, 2010, at the age of 91. He had been a longtime summer resident of Southampton. He was buried at Brookside Cemetery in Englewood.

Political offices
| Preceded by Albert Moskin | Mayor of Englewood, New Jersey; 1960–1963 | Succeeded by Francis J. Donovan |
| Preceded by William J. Ticknor | Mayor of Englewood, New Jersey; 1966–1967 | Succeeded by Robert I. Miller |
New Jersey General Assembly
| Preceded by District created | Member of the New Jersey General Assembly from the 13-B district 1968–1970; Served alongside: Thomas Costa | Succeeded by William J. Dorgan |
| Preceded by Richard Vander Plaat; Richard W. DeKorte | Member of the New Jersey General Assembly from the 13-E district 1970–1972; Served alongside: Edward A. Connell | Succeeded by Robert C. Veit; Edward H. Hynes |
