= John P. Gallagher =

American politician

Member of the New Jersey Senate from the 13th district
- In office January 12, 1982 – January 10, 1984
- Preceded by: Joseph P. Merlino
- Succeeded by: Richard Van Wagner

Personal details
- Born: February 12, 1932 Kenilworth, New Jersey, U.S.
- Died: October 13, 2011 (aged 79) Lincroft, New Jersey, U.S.
- Party: Republican
- Spouse(s): Barbara J. Warner, Carol Kastner

John P. Gallagher (February 12, 1932 – October 13, 2011) was an American politician who served in the New Jersey Senate from the 13th Legislative District from 1982 to 1984.

== Early life ==
Born in Kenilworth, New Jersey, Gallagher graduated from Jonathan Dayton High School, Springfield Township. He lived in Piscataway and was later a resident of Middletown Township.

After high school Gallagher served in the United States Army Corps of Engineers, attaining the rank of sergeant. During the Korean War, he was stationed in Washington, D.C.

John P. Gallagher was a Republican delegate to the 1966 New Jersey Constitutional Convention. From 1966 to 1970, he was chairman of the Middlesex County Republican Executive Committee, and was a delegate to the 1968 Republican National Convention.

From 1970 to 1972, Gallagher served as a commissioner on the former New Jersey Highway Authority. Between 1972 and 1976, he was that authority's executive director.

He was a representative of investment banking and brokerage firm Ryan Beck & Co., retiring in 2004.

== New Jersey Senate ==
John P. Gallagher was elected in the 1981 general election to the New Jersey Senate seat representing the 13th Legislative District, defeating Democratic incumbent Senator Eugene J. Bedell.

In the 1983 general election, Gallagher was defeated for reelection by Democratic Assemblyman Richard Van Wagner.

He died on October 13, 2011, in Lincroft, New Jersey at age 79.
