= William J. Dorgan =

American politician

William James Dorgan
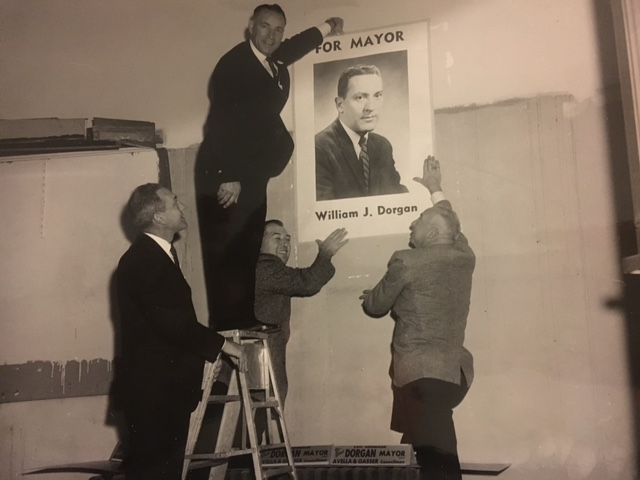
- 1966 Mayoral Campaign

Member of the New Jersey General Assembly from the 13B district
- In office January 13, 1970 – September 1, 1971 Serving with Thomas Costa
- Preceded by: Austin Volk
- Succeeded by: Byron Baer; Albert Burstein

Director of Bergen County Freeholders
- In office January 1968 – January 1969
- Preceded by: D. Bennett Mazur
- Succeeded by: Henry Hoebel

Bergen County Board of Chosen Freeholders
- In office 1967 – 1969 and 1973 – 1974

Mayor of Palisades Park
- In office 1961 – 1964 and 1965 – 1967
- Preceded by: Edward Browne
- Succeeded by: Thomas Toscano

Personal details
- Born: November 9, 1921 Cliffside Park, New Jersey
- Died: October 11, 2003 (aged 81) Deerfield Beach, Florida, U.S.
- Party: Republican

William J. Dorgan (November 9, 1921 – October 11, 2003) was an American Republican Party politician who served in the New Jersey General Assembly, as Mayor of Palisades Park, New Jersey, and as a member of the Bergen County Board of Chosen Freeholders. Dorgan was born on November 9, 1921, in Cliffside Park, New Jersey, the son of William and Julia Dorgan. He graduated from St. Cecilia High School and attended Seton Hall University. Dorgan served in the US Coast Guard during World War II and was a Commander of VFW Post 4365.

== Biography ==
William Dorgan served for seven years as the Mayor of Palisades Park (1961 – 1967), and for three years as a Bergen County Freeholder (1967 – 1969). He was a delegate to the 1968 Republican National Convention and a member of President Richard Nixon's Advisory Council to the General Services Administration. Dorgan was elected to the NJ General Assembly in 1969 but resigned in August 1971 to accept two governor-appointed posts. Governor Cahill named Dorgan to chair the New Jersey Election Law Revision Commission. He also appointed Dorgan to a senior administrative post with the NJ Turnpike Authority. Dorgan returned to the Board of Freeholders in 1973 to fill a mid-term vacancy on the board. He ran for Freeholder again in November 1974 but was defeated. In 1976, Dorgan was appointed Executive Director of the Southeast Morris County Municipal Utilities Authority and retired from the post in 1986.

- Nixon nomination - NJ’s delegation to the 1968 Republican National Convention was expected to back its favorite son, NJ Senator Clifford Case, in the first round of balloting. As Nixon gained momentum in the first round, Dorgan was one of 18 NJ delegates urged on by Bergen County GOP Chairman Nelson Gross and State Sen. Frank S. Farley, to cast votes for Nixon instead. NJ was the only delegation to break from a favorite son candidate. The delegation became a significant force and catalyst for Nixon’s nomination occurring on the first ballot.
- Chairman, NJ Election Law Revision Commission - The New Jersey Election Law Revision Commission was a bipartisan panel established in 1964 for the purpose of overhauling the state's election laws, NJ Statutes Title 19 —last updated in 1930. The panel was ordered to provide the governor and legislature with recommendations for modernizing and simplifying laws across the 21 counties and 565 municipalities. Dorgan chaired the commission from 1971 to 1975 and delivered the final report to the governor and legislators before the 1975 session.
- Special election - In the 1964 presidential landslide (LBJ over Goldwater), Dorgan was defeated for a third term as Palisades Park Mayor by a 4-vote margin. Following a recount, he petitioned the court in a civil case, claiming more than 30 ballots should be disqualified. In a highly publicized trial, Superior Court Judge Morris Malech determined that at least 4 of the votes were cast by former residents who were not eligible to vote in Palisades Park. The court voided the election results. Dorgan's opponent lost an appeal of the trial court’s ruling. Thirteen voters were investigated and subsequently indicted by a Bergen County grand jury. In a separate action, Superior Court Judge Gordon H. Brown ordered a special election and an interim mayor was appointed. On August 3, 1965, Dorgan won the special election by a margin of 279 votes. He was sworn in as mayor again on August 16. The court’s ruling set a precedent for the state’s future treatment of challenged elections.

== New Jersey Assemblyman (1970–1971) ==
Dorgan was elected to the NJ General Assembly in November 1969 and served on committees for Federal/State Relations and Taxation, representing East Bergen County. He resigned from the Assembly in mid-1971, accepting appointments to the NJ Turnpike Authority and the NJ Election Law Revision Commission.

- Introduced a compromise solution to fund a controversial Rutgers University program for disadvantaged students. “The Dorgan Bill” as it became known, was supported by the University, and was passed by both houses of the state legislature
- Sponsored a bill that doubled the Bergen County Park Commission debt ceiling from $5 million to $10 million. The bill was especially important for future development of Overpeck County Park and passed in both houses of the state legislature.
- Supported legislation to develop the Meadowlands Sports Complex in East Rutherford
- Sponsored a bill to designate Martin Luther King's birthday as a public holiday. (Had it passed, NJ would have been the first state to honor King in this way.)

== Bergen County Freeholder (1967–1969 and 1973–1974) ==
Dorgan was elected to a three-year term on the Bergen County Board of Freeholders in 1966. After Republicans regained the majority in November 1967, Dorgan was named Executive Director and led a bipartisan effort to reform the county charter. Ultimately the NJ Assembly failed to approve the charter changes. He returned as Freeholder, replacing June Clark who resigned from the board in November 1973. In the wake of Watergate, he lost his November 1974 bid for another term.

- Secured funding for the opening of Bergen Community College
- Phased out tuition fees for Bergen County Technical & Vocational School
- Expanded the county's parks and recreational facilities including Overpeck Golf Course, Darlington, Wallington Park, and the Campgaw Ski Area
- Created the county's "Operation Outdoors" summer program for youngsters from low-income families

== Palisades Park Mayor (1961–1964 and 1965–1967) ==
Dorgan defeated incumbent Democrat Edward Brown in 1960 and served two consecutive two-year terms. Following a voided election in November 1964, Dorgan won a special election in August 1965. In 1966, he ran a dual candidacy, winning races in both the county and municipal governments. Following an unsuccessful legal challenge by Democrats, Dorgan held freeholder and mayor posts in 1967. Dorgan resigned as mayor on January 1, 1968.

- Prioritized construction of a new borough hall complex to house municipal offices, police station, fire station, and the town’s library. (Completed in 1962)
- Proposed plans in 1962 to build the town’s new high school on the Jabel Park site. (Completed in 1968)
- Challenged the county in court in 1965 to gain back property deeded over by the town for the development of Overpeck County Park. Settled out of court in 1969, the county gave the town (1) first-preference access to the new sports complex for Palisades Park High School and (2) five acres of land adjacent to Overpeck Park for the town’s new community swimming pool.
