= Jeremiah F. O'Connor =

American politician (1933–2020)

Member of the New Jersey Senate from the 13th district
- In office January 11, 1966 – January 9, 1968 Serving with Ned Parsekian; Matthew Feldman; Alfred Kiefer
- Preceded by: District created
- Succeeded by: Fairleigh Dickinson Jr. Joseph C. Woodcock; Alfred D. Schiaffo; Garrett W. Hagedorn; Willard B. Knowlton

Bergen County Freeholder
- In office 1975–1980

Personal details
- Born: May 18, 1933 New York City, New York
- Died: May 13, 2020 (aged 86) Edgewater, New Jersey
- Party: Democratic

Jeremiah F. O'Connor (May 18, 1933 – May 13, 2020) was an American politician who served in the New Jersey Senate from the 13th district from 1966 to 1968.

O'Connor was born in Manhattan and He graduated from Rice High School. He went on to receive his bachelor's degree in economics and finances from Iona College in New Rochelle, New York. He worked in financial institutions and banking in New Jersey.

O'Connor served on the Saddle Brook township board and as mayor of Saddle Brook. O'Connor served on the Bergen County Board of Chosen Freeholders. He died on May 13, 2020, in Edgewater, at age 86.
