= Gerard Scharfenberger =

Member of the New Jersey General Assembly

Gerry Scharfenberger
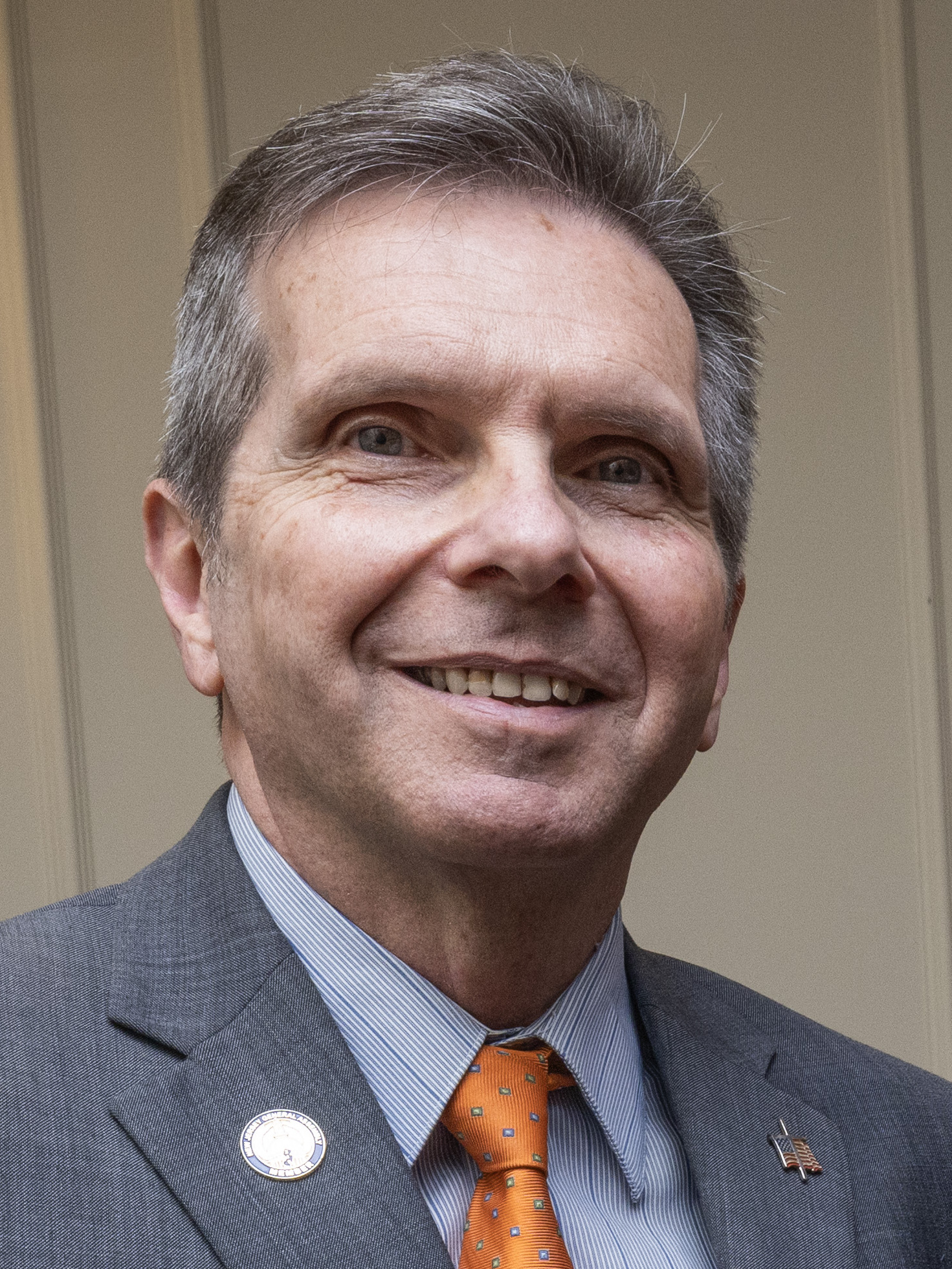
- Scharfenberger in 2025

Member of the New Jersey General Assembly from the 13th district
- Incumbent
- Assumed office January 14, 2020 Serving with Vicky Flynn
- Preceded by: Amy Handlin

Member of the Monmouth County Board of Chosen Freeholders
- In office February 3, 2018 – January 7, 2020
- Preceded by: Serena DiMaso
- Succeeded by: Nick DiRocco

Mayor of Middletown Township
- In office 2016–2017
- Preceded by: Stephanie C. Murray
- Succeeded by: Kevin Settembrino
- In office 2013–2014
- Preceded by: Anthony P. Fiore
- Succeeded by: Stephanie C. Murray
- In office 2010–2011
- Preceded by: Pamela Brightbill
- Succeeded by: Anthony P. Fiore
- In office 2007–2008
- Preceded by: Rosemarie Peters
- Succeeded by: Pamela Brightbill

Personal details
- Born: November 29, 1958 (age 67) Brooklyn, New York, U.S.
- Party: Republican
- Education: Rutgers University (BA); Hunter College (MA); CUNY Graduate Center (PhD)
- Website: Legislative Website

Gerard P. Scharfenberger (born November 29, 1958) is an American politician, adjunct professor and Republican Party politician who has served in the New Jersey General Assembly representing the 13th Legislative District since 2020, replacing Amy Handlin. Scharfenberger had previously served on the Monmouth County Board of Chosen Freeholders and as Mayor of Middletown Township.

== Background ==
Scharfenberger was born in Brooklyn and is a resident of Middletown Township, New Jersey. Before entering politics, Scharfenberger was an archaeologist who worked on historical sites around Monmouth County. Scharfenberger has worked as an adjunct professor of archaeology at Monmouth University.

== Political career ==
Scharfenberger was first elected to the Middletown Township Committee in 2005. He served as Mayor in 2007, 2008, 2010, 2013, 2016 and 2017 and Deputy Mayor in 2006 and 2009. During his time as Mayor, Scharfenberger served on Chris Christie's 2009 transition team and from, 2010 to 2018, as Director of the Office for Planning Advocacy. Scharfenberger was fired from the latter position after refusing to attend a Phil Murphy press conference in support of the governor's support for a federal property tax deduction. Scharfenberger has also served on the Middletown Landmarks Commission since 1996.

Scharfenberger ran briefly for the State Assembly in 2017, but dropped out when incumbent Amy Handlin withdrew from a State Senate race against eventual winner Declan O'Scanlon. Scharfenberger was appointed to the Monmouth County Board of Chosen Freeholders after Serena DiMaso was elected to the State Assembly in 2018, winning the subsequent election against Democrat Larry Luttrell. Scharfenberger then ran for the State Assembly in 2019, winning alongside DiMaso.

=== General Assembly ===
Scharfenberger opposed a State Senate measure requesting that the Library of Congress remove General Phillip Kearny's statue from Statuary Hall, stating, "However well-meaning intentions may be, the eradication of symbols from our rich historic past must be prevented."

During the COVID-19 pandemic in New Jersey, Scharfenberger refused to accept his legislative salary on the grounds that his constituents' unemployment claims were not adequately fulfilled. In his letter to the state treasurer, Scharfenberger wrote, "I cannot, in good conscience, continue to accept a salary while these issues remain unresolved and my constituents struggle through no fault of their own."

=== Committees ===
Committee assignments for the current session are:

- Environment and Solid Waste
- Higher Education
- Regulated Professions

=== District 13 ===
Each of the 40 districts in the New Jersey Legislature has one representative in the New Jersey Senate and two members in the New Jersey General Assembly. The representatives from the 13th District for the 2024—2025 Legislative Session are:

- Senator Declan O'Scanlon (R)
- Assemblyman Vicky Flynn (R)
- Assemblyman Gerard Scharfenberger (R)

== Personal life ==
Scharfenberger is married to wife Geraldine and has two children, Alannah and Dan. Scharfenberger's son-in-law, Tony Perry, currently serves as Mayor of Middletown and was previously Chief of Staff for state senator Joe Kyrillos.

Scharfenberger's son, Dan, is a Republican Party strategist in New Jersey.

== Electoral history ==
=== New Jersey Assembly ===
13th Legislative District General Election, 2023
Party	Candidate	Votes	%
Republican	Vicky Flynn (incumbent)	30,744	28.9
Republican	Gerard P. Scharfenberger (incumbent)	30,474	28.6
Democratic	Danielle Mastropiero	22,440	21.1
Democratic	Paul Eschelbach	21,655	20.3
Libertarian	John Morrison	1,241	1.2
Total votes		106,554	100.0
Republican hold			
Republican hold			

New Jersey general election, 2021
Party	Candidate	Votes	%	±%
Republican	Gerard Scharfenberger	51,324	31	▲1.5
Republican	Victoria Flynn	50,823	31	▲1.5
Democratic	Erin Howard	31,731	19	▼1.5
Democratic	Allison Friedman	31,816	19	▼1.5

New Jersey general election, 2019
Party	Candidate	Votes	%	±%
Republican	Gerard Scharfenberger	25,155	29.9	▲1.0
Republican	Serena DiMaso	24,649	29.3	▲1.8
Democratic	Barbara Singer	17,240	20.5	▼1.4
Democratic	Allison Friedman	17,181	20.4	▼1.0

=== Monmouth County Board of Chosen Freeholders ===
New Jersey general election, 2018
Party	Candidate	Votes	%
Republican	Gerard Scharfenberger	129,679	51.71
Democratic	Larry Luttrell	120,932	48.23

=== Middletown Township Committee ===
New Jersey general election, 2016
Party	Candidate	Votes	%
Republican	Gerard Scharfenberger	20,257	31.42
Republican	Kevin Settembrino	19,418	30.12
Democratic	Mary Jo Fabiano	11,813	18.32
Democratic	Raphael Borgess	11,268	17.48
Independent	Brian Largey	1,690	2.62

New Jersey general election, 2013
Party	Candidate	Votes	%
Republican	Gerard Scharfenberger	11,839	31.52
Republican	Kevin Settembrino	11,295	30.07
Democratic	Linda Baum	7,243	19.28
Democratic	Patricia Olsen	7,177	19.11

New Jersey general election, 2010
Party	Candidate	Votes	%
Republican	Gerard Scharfenberger	12,448	28.51
Republican	Kevin Settembrino	12,295	28.16
Democratic	Sean Byrnes	9,640	22.08
Democratic	Mary Mahoney	9,275	21.24

New Jersey general election, 2007
Party	Candidate	Votes	%
Republican	Gerard Scharfenberger	7,498	26.02
Democratic	Sean Byrnes	7,309	25.36
Democratic	Janet Moscuzza	7,047	24.45
Republican	Tristan Nelson	6,958	24.14

New Jersey general election, 2004
Party	Candidate	Votes	%
Republican	Thomas Hall	17,876	27.74
Republican	Gerard Scharfenberger	17,141	26.60
Democratic	Patricia Olsen	14,198	22.03
Democratic	Steven Borbely	13,174	20.44
Independent	Joseph McGrath	2,043	3.17
