= Vicky Flynn =

Member of the New Jersey General Assembly

Member of the New Jersey General Assembly from the 13th district
- Incumbent
- Assumed office January 11, 2022 Serving with Gerard Scharfenberger
- Preceded by: Serena DiMaso

Personal details
- Born: July 14, 1972 (age 54) Hoboken, New Jersey, U.S.
- Party: Republican
- Education: Rutgers University, New Brunswick (BA); Seton Hall University (JD)
- Website: Assembly website

Victoria Flynn (born July 14, 1972) is an American lawyer and Republican politician who has represented the 13th Legislative District in the New Jersey General Assembly since taking office on January 11, 2022.

== Political career ==
Flynn was born in Hoboken, New Jersey, and graduated from Rutgers University and Seton Hall University School of Law.

In 2016, Flynn was elected to the board of education of the Holmdel Township Public Schools and in 2018 became president of the board, having previously served on the board of education of the Nutley Public Schools.

Flynn ran in the primary for New Jersey's 13th legislative district against incumbent Republican Serena DiMaso. She won the November 2, 2021, general election alongside Republican Gerard Scharfenberger, defeating Democratic candidates Allison Friedman and Erin Howard.

Flynn was one of a record seven new Republican Assemblywomen elected in the 2022 general election, joining seven Republican women incumbents who won re-election that year.

Flynn was reelected, alongside her seatmate Scharfenberger, in 2023 and in 2025.

=== Committees ===
Committee assignments for the current session are:

- Financial Institutions and Insurance
- Housing
- Judiciary
- Joint Committee on the Public Schools

=== District 13 ===
Each of the 40 districts in the New Jersey Legislature has one representative in the New Jersey Senate and two members in the New Jersey General Assembly. The representatives from the 13th District for the 2024—2025 Legislative Session are:

- Senator Declan O'Scanlon (R)
- Assemblyman Vicky Flynn (R)
- Assemblyman Gerard Scharfenberger (R)

== Electoral history ==
2021 New Jersey's 13th legislative district assembly election
Party	Candidate	Votes	%
Republican	Gerard P. Scharfenberger (incumbent)	53,055	30.76%
Republican	Vicky Flynn	52,525	30.45%
Democratic	Allison Friedman	33,509	19.43%
Democratic	Erin Howard	33,396	19.36%
Total votes		172,485	100.0
Republican hold			

2023 New Jersey's 13th legislative district assembly election
Party	Candidate	Votes	%
Republican	Vicky Flynn (incumbent)	30,744	28.9
Republican	Gerard P. Scharfenberger (incumbent)	30,474	28.6
Democratic	Danielle Mastropiero	22,440	21.1
Democratic	Paul Eschelbach	21,655	20.3
Libertarian	John Morrison	1,241	1.2
Total votes		106,554	100.0
Republican hold			
Republican hold			

2025 New Jersey's 13th legislative district assembly election
Party	Candidate	Votes	%
Republican	Vicky Flynn (incumbent)	58,840	28.9%
Republican	Gerard Scharfenberger (incumbent)	58,334	28.7%
Democratic	Jason M. Corley Sr.	44,078	21.7%
Democratic	Vaibhav Gorige	42,031	20.7%
Total votes		203,283	100.0%
Republican hold			
Republican hold			
