= James T. Phillips =

American politician

Member of the New Jersey Senate from the 13th district
- In office July 29, 1991 – January 14, 1992
- Preceded by: Richard Van Wagner
- Succeeded by: Joe Kyrillos

Mayor of Old Bridge
- In office January 1, 2004 – April 25, 2011
- Preceded by: Barbara Cannon
- Succeeded by: Patrick Gillespie

Middlesex County Freeholder
- In office 1990–1995

Personal details
- Born: July 8, 1953
- Died: February 1, 2014 (aged 60) New Brunswick, New Jersey, U.S.
- Party: Democratic
- Spouse: Janet Phillips
- Children: 3
- Education: Villanova University

James Thomas Phillips (July 8, 1953 – February 1, 2014) was an American Democratic Party politician from Old Bridge Township, New Jersey. He had served as a Middlesex County Freeholder and Treasurer, mayor of Old Bridge, and as a New Jersey Senator.

== Early life and education ==
Phillips was a life-long resident of Old Bridge and son of Jack Phillips, another Freeholder and Old Bridge mayor. He was a 1971 graduate of St. Mary's High School (later Cardinal McCarrick High School) in South Amboy and Villanova University. He was an accountant and a certified municipal financial officer by trade.

== Elected office ==
Phillips's first elected office was to the Middlesex County Board of Chosen Freeholders which he served from 1990 to 1995 when he resigned to become Middlesex County Treasurer, a position he held until December 2013. Whilst serving as Freeholder, Phillips was appointed in July 1991 to the New Jersey Senate seat in the 13th district left vacant by Richard Van Wagner upon being appointed to the New Jersey Sports and Exposition Authority. In the wake of the anti-tax and anti-Florio sentiment in that year's legislative elections, he was defeated for a full term by Assemblyman Joe Kyrillos.

In 1999, he ran for mayor of Old Bridge Township but was defeated. Four years later, he was successful in an election to become mayor. While mayor, he championed preserving open space and the construction of low-income housing. He was reelected in 2007 but in April 2011, he resigned for health reasons.

== Death ==
He died on February 1, 2014, at Robert Wood Johnson University Hospital in New Brunswick at the age of 60.
