= Harold C. Hollenbeck =

American politician and judge (born 1932)

Harold Hollenbeck
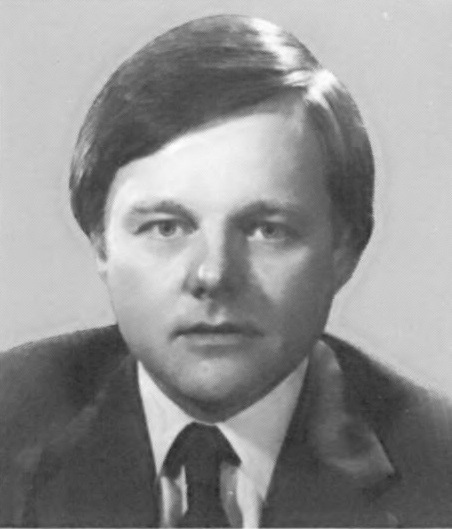

Member of the U.S. House of Representatives from New Jersey's 9th district
- In office January 3, 1977 – January 3, 1983
- Preceded by: Henry Helstoski
- Succeeded by: Robert Torricelli

Member of the New Jersey Senate from the 13th district
- In office January 11, 1972 – January 8, 1974
- Preceded by: Multi-member district
- Succeeded by: Joseph P. Merlino

Member of the New Jersey General Assembly from the 13A district
- In office January 9, 1968 – January 11, 1972 Serving with Peter Russo
- Preceded by: Constituency established
- Succeeded by: Harold Pareti

Personal details
- Born: Harold Capistran Hollenbeck; December 29, 1938 (age 87) Passaic, New Jersey, U.S.
- Party: Republican
- Education: Fairleigh Dickinson University (BA); University of Virginia (LLB)

Harold Capistran Hollenbeck (born December 29, 1938) is an American lawyer and Republican Party politician who represented New Jersey's 9th congressional district in the United States House of Representatives for three terms from 1977 to 1983.

== Life and career ==
Born in Passaic, New Jersey, Hollenbeck grew up in East Rutherford, New Jersey and graduated from East Rutherford High School. He received a B.A. from Fairleigh Dickinson University, Rutherford (1961) and was awarded an LL.B. from the University of Virginia in 1964. He was admitted to the New Jersey bar in 1965 and commenced practice in Ridgewood. He served as member of the East Rutherford Borough Council from 1967 to 1969, and in the New Jersey General Assembly from 1968 to 1972. He was in the New Jersey Senate from 1972 to 1974. He served as delegate to the 1968 Republican National Convention.

=== Congress ===
Hollenbeck was elected as a Republican to the Ninety-fifth Congress, unseating scandal-tainted Democrat Henry Helstoski by a solid margin. He was reelected the two succeeding Congresses (January 3, 1977 to January 3, 1983) and compiled a moderate, pro-labor record. He was an unsuccessful candidate for reelection in 1982 to the Ninety-eighth Congress, a victim of redistricting and negative campaigning by Robert Torricelli, who unseated him by a 54% to 46% margin.

=== Later life and career ===
He was appointed a judge by Governor of New Jersey Thomas Kean, to the New Jersey Superior Court and sworn in July 1, 1987, and subsequently moved to family court.

He has been a resident of Ridgewood, New Jersey.

U.S. House of Representatives
Preceded by Henry Helstoski	Member of the U.S. House of Representatives from New Jersey's 9th congressional district 1977–1983	Succeeded by Robert Torricelli
U.S. order of precedence (ceremonial)
Preceded by Andrew Maguire as Former USU.S.Representative	Order of precedence of the United States as Former U.S. Representative	Succeeded by Billy Lee Evans as Former U.S. Representative
