= Helen Chiarello Szabo =

American politician

Member of the New Jersey General Assembly from the 13th Legislative District
- In office November 8, 1976 – September 25, 1978
- Preceded by: S. Howard Woodson
- Succeeded by: Gerald R. Stockman

Personal details
- Born: Helen A. Chiarello; April 17, 1923 Glen Campbell, Pennsylvania, U.S.
- Died: August 11, 2015 (aged 92) New Jersey, U.S.
- Party: Democratic

Helen A. Chiarello Szabo (April 17, 1923 – August 11, 2015) was an American politician who served in the New Jersey General Assembly from the 13th Legislative District from 1976 to 1978.

Szabo took office in a 1976 special election to succeed S. Howard Woodson, who resigned to head the New Jersey Civil Service Commission. In turn, Szabo stepped down to become the superintendent of elections in Mercer County and was succeeded in a November 1978 special election by Gerald R. Stockman.

Szabo died in New Jersey on August 11, 2015, at the age of 92.
