= Thomas Costa =

American politician

Thomas J. Costa (June 30, 1912 – April 1, 2003) was an American Republican Party politician who served two terms in the New Jersey General Assembly, as well as serving as the mayor of Teaneck, New Jersey, and as a Bergen County Freeholder.

== Early life ==
Costa was born June 30, 1912, in Bronx, New York, the son of Joseph and Mary Costa. He was a member of the first graduating class of Teaneck High School, in 1931. He is a graduate of New York University and John Marshall Law School.

== Elected office ==
He was elected to the Board of Education of the Teaneck Public Schools in 1946, and was re-elected in 1949 and 1952. Costa was elected to the Teaneck Township Council in 1958, along with another young politician, Matthew Feldman. He was re-elected in 1962 and 1966. He was Deputy Mayor from 1962 to 1966. After Feldman was elected to the State Senate, Costa replaced Feldman as Mayor, where he served from 1966 to 1969.

Costa was elected to the State Assembly in 1967, as part of the same Republican tide that swept Feldman out of office. Costa and his running mate, Austin Volk, defeated two freshman Democratic incumbents, Vito Albanese and Arnold E. Brown. Costa finished first in that race, beating Brown by over 10,000 votes. He was re-elected in 1969, running on a ticket with William J. Dorgan; they defeated Democratic challengers Martin T. Durkin and Ernest Allen Cohen by about 10,000 votes.

Costa did not seek re-election to a third term as an Assemblyman in 1971; instead, he ran successfully for a seat on the Bergen County Board of Chosen Freeholders. He lost a bid for re-election in the Democratic landslide of 1974.

== Family ==
In 1937, Costa married Alvera Manewal (1913-2004) in St. Paul's Lutheran Church, Teaneck, New Jersey, in 1937. Both were members of the first graduation class of Teaneck High School in June 1931. They had two children: Thomas J. Costa, Jr., and Arlene Costa Miller. Costa died in Fort Lauderdale, Florida, on April 1, 2003, at age 90.
