= Joseph Azzolina =

American politician

Member of the New Jersey General Assembly from the 13th district
- In office January 14, 1992 – January 10, 2006
- Preceded by: Joe Kyrillos
- Succeeded by: Amy Handlin
- In office January 14, 1986 – January 12, 1988
- Preceded by: Jacqueline Walker; Bill Flynn
- Succeeded by: Joe Kyrillos

Member of the New Jersey Senate from the 5th Legislative District (at-large)
- In office January 11, 1972 – January 8, 1974
- Preceded by: Seat created
- Succeeded by: John J. Horn

Member of the New Jersey General Assembly
- In office January 11, 1966 – January 11, 1972
- Preceded by: Clarkson Sherman Fisher; Irving E. Keith
- Succeeded by: Chester Apy; Eugene J. Bedell
- Constituency: Monmouth County 1966–1968; District 5B 1968–1972

Personal details
- Born: January 26, 1926 Newark, New Jersey, U.S.
- Died: April 15, 2010 (aged 84) New York City, New York, U.S.
- Party: Republican
- Education: College of the Holy Cross (BS); New York University (MBA)

Joseph Azzolina (January 26, 1926 – April 15, 2010) was an American Republican Party politician who served in the New Jersey Legislature for a total of 24 years. 22 of these years he served in the New Jersey General Assembly while he served two years in the New Jersey Senate, each time representing parts of Monmouth County.

== Early life and education ==
Azzolina was raised in Highlands, New Jersey, and attended Atlantic Highlands High School. His parents were John and Angelina Giaimi Azzolina; they were Sicilian Americans who immigrated to the U.S. from Sicily during the 1920s.

After high school, Azzolina graduated from the College of the Holy Cross in Worcester, Massachusetts, with a Bachelor of Science in naval science. He then attended the New York University Graduate School of Business.

== Career ==
He joined the U.S. Navy in 1944 at 18 years old and was later enrolled in ROTC at Drew University. Azzolina left the Active Duty Navy in 1947 to serve in the U.S. Naval Reserves, where he eventually earned the rank of captain. As well as being a politician and businessman, Azzolina also owned The Courier newspaper, in Middletown, which he purchased in 1982 and operated until it closed, in April, 2009. Azzolina served in the United States Naval Reserve from 1947 to 1986, Captain (ret). As a reservist, he returned to active duty in 1983 for a tour of seven months – four of them off the coast of Lebanon – aboard the battleship USS New Jersey. He received three Meritorious Service Medals and two Navy Secretary Commendation Medals in addition to other combat awards and honors. Assemblyman Azzolina was chairman of the U.S.S. New Jersey Battleship Commission, and led the effort to acquire the retired ship and have it docked in New Jersey waters where it was then transformed into a floating museum.

He also served in the Assembly from 1966 to 1972 and again from 1986 to 1988. Azzolina also served in the upper house of the New Jersey Legislature, the New Jersey Senate, from 1972 to 1973. Azzolina served in the Assembly on the State Government Committee. He ran for the New Jersey State Senate in 1987, but lost by a very narrow margin. He also ran for the Congress in 1988, but lost a close race to state Senator Frank Pallone.

Azzolina was defeated in the June 2005 GOP primary, and was replaced in the Assembly by fellow Republican Amy Handlin, who took office on January 10, 2006 when Azzolina's term ended.

As an Assemblyman, Azzolina sponsored legislation to provide a $250 property tax deduction for veterans, and a measure creating a model program in Monmouth County that uses specially-trained nurses to provide care for and collect forensic evidence from victims of sexual assault. Another measure sponsored by the assemblyman would create a central registry containing records of all persons who have been charged with a crime or offense involved domestic violence. Under the measure, the records would only be released to law enforcement agencies and the courts.

Azzolina was born in Newark, New Jersey and was a resident of Middletown Township, New Jersey. He was President of Food Circus Supermarkets, Inc.

He died of pancreatic cancer on April 15, 2010, in Manhattan, New York City New York at age 84. The bridge connecting Sea Bright to Highlands is called the "Captain Joseph Azzolina Memorial Bridge" in his honor.

== District 13 ==
Each of the forty districts in the New Jersey Legislature has one representative in the New Jersey Senate and two members in the New Jersey General Assembly. The other representatives from the 13th District for the 2004–05 Legislative Session were:

- Assemblyman Samuel D. Thompson, and
- Senator Joseph M. Kyrillos
