= Richard W. DeKorte =

American politician

Majority Leader of the New Jersey General Assembly
- In office 1969–1970

Member of the New Jersey General Assembly
- In office January 8, 1968 – April 30, 1973
- Preceded by: District created
- Succeeded by: Vacant; district later eliminated
- Constituency: District 13E (1968–1970); District 13D (1970–1973)

Personal details
- Born: March 27, 1936 Paterson, New Jersey
- Died: March 16, 1975 (aged 38) Franklin Lakes, NJ U.S.
- Party: Republican
- Education: Amherst College; University of Chicago Law School

Richard William DeKorte (March 27, 1936 – March 16, 1975) was a New Jersey Republican member of the New Jersey General Assembly.

He was born in Paterson, New Jersey to John I. and Henrietta DeKorte, and educated at Ramsey High School, Amherst College and the University of Chicago Law School. DeKorte specialized in estate law at the Paterson law firm of Jeffer, Walter, Tierney, DeKorte, Hopkinson & Vogel. He served as a mayor and councilman in his hometown of Franklin Lakes, New Jersey.

DeKorte was elected to the New Jersey General Assembly in 1967 and later elected majority leader with Thomas Kean as speaker. In 1973, DeKorte was appointed counsel to Governor of New Jersey William T. Cahill and subsequently resigned his Assembly seat.

On March 16, 1975, DeKorte died of cancer at his home in Franklin Lakes, New Jersey.

DeKorte's widow Paulette, after a remarriage, changed her name to Paulette Ramsey, and as of 2019 was a Councilwoman on the Franklin Lakes Borough Council.

After DeKorte's death in 1975, the commission headquarters was named Richard W. DeKorte Park in his honor. The commission has been called the New Jersey Meadowlands Commission since the year 2000.
