= Richard Van Wagner =

American politician

Member of the New Jersey Senate from the 13th district
- In office January 10, 1984 – July 19, 1991
- Preceded by: John P. Gallagher
- Succeeded by: James T. Phillips

Member of the New Jersey General Assembly
- In office January 8, 1974 – January 10, 1984 Serving with Bill Flynn
- Preceded by: District created
- Succeeded by: Jacqueline Walker
- Constituency: 12th District (1974–1982); 13th District (1982–1984)

Personal details
- Born: October 23, 1936 Jersey City, New Jersey, U.S.
- Died: March 3, 2007 (aged 70) Naples, Florida, U.S.
- Party: Democratic

Richard Van Wagner (October 23, 1936 – March 3, 2007) was an American politician who served in the New Jersey General Assembly from 1974 to 1984 and in the New Jersey Senate from 1984 to 1991.

New Jersey General Assembly
Preceded by Constituency established	Member of the New Jersey General Assembly from the 12th district January 8, 1974–January 12, 1982; Served alongside: Bill Flynn	Succeeded by John O. Bennett
Preceded by Francis J. McManimon	Member of the New Jersey General Assembly from the 13th district January 12, 1982–January 10, 1984; Served alongside: Bill Flynn	Succeeded by Jacqueline Walker
New Jersey Senate
Preceded by John P. Gallagher	Member of the New Jersey Senate from the 13th district January 10, 1984–July 19, 1991	Succeeded by James T. Phillips
