= Henry Helstoski =

American lawyer and politician (1924–1999)

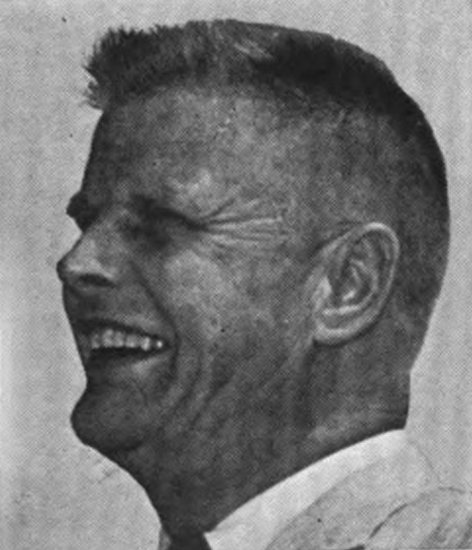

Member of the U.S. House of Representatives from New Jersey's 9th district
- In office January 3, 1965 - January 3, 1977
- Preceded by: Frank C. Osmers Jr.
- Succeeded by: Harold C. Hollenbeck

Personal details
- Born: March 21, 1924 Wallington, New Jersey, U.S.
- Died: December 16, 1999 (aged 75) Wayne, New Jersey, U.S.
- Party: Democratic
- Spouses: Elizabeth Ann Markle (m. 1947; div. 1955) Victoria Ubaldo (m. 1965)
- Education: Montclair State Teachers College (BS, MA)

Military service
- Allegiance: United States
- Branch/service: United States Army
- Years of service: 1943–1945
- Unit: U.S. Army Air Corps

Henry Helstoski (March 21, 1924 – December 16, 1999) was an American politician and veteran of World War II. Helstoski, a Democrat, represented New Jersey in the United States House of Representatives for twelve years, lasting from 1965 until 1977. He was the representative for New Jersey's 8th congressional district.

He is best remembered for being indicted on charges of receiving bribes from illegal aliens in 1976, but he was never tried as all his charges were dropped by the United States Supreme Court.

== Background ==
Helstoski was born in the Bergen County town of Wallington, New Jersey. He attended public schools in Wallington and East Rutherford. He graduated from East Rutherford High School in 1940.

=== World War II ===
Helstoski enlisted in the United States Army Air Corps and served as an instructor and radio technician until the end of World War II in 1945.

=== Early career ===
After the war, he went to Paterson State College and graduated from Montclair State Teachers College with a Bachelor of Arts degree in 1947 and Master of Arts degree in 1949. Over the next thirteen years, Helstoski served as a teacher, high school principal and finally superintendent of all Bergen County schools.

In 1956 he served as councilman of East Rutherford, New Jersey, and he served as Mayor of East Rutherford from 1957 until 1965. During his term as mayor, Helstoski also served as a management consultant in advertising until 1964.

== Congress ==
Helstoski, a Democrat, then ran for the House of Representatives seat for New Jersey's 9th congressional district. The anti-Vietnam War Helstoski beat the nine-term Republican incumbent Frank C. Osmers Jr. by 2,428 votes to win the election, and he was sworn into the 89th United States Congress on January 3, 1965. In 1969, Helstoski ran for Governor of New Jersey, becoming a candidate in the election just thirty minutes before the filing deadline, and he finished third in the Democratic primary behind former governor Robert B. Meyner. In Congress, he served as a member of the Committee on Interstate and Foreign Commerce from 1971 to 1974.

=== Legal issues ===
After being re-elected five times (for a total of six terms) to the House of Representatives, Helstoski ran into some problems. First, in 1975, he became the target of a federal corruption investigation that would span two years and four grand juries. In April of the following year, his brother was convicted of filing a false income tax return. In the 1976 congressional elections, three-time state assemblyman Byron Baer challenged Helstoski in the Democratic primary.

A week before the primary, Helstoski was indicted on charges of extortion from illegal aliens from Chile and Argentina who in exchange wanted Helstoski to support a bill that let them remain in the United States. He was also accused of obstruction of justice, providing a false testimony before a grand jury, and conspiracy, in order to influence other witnesses to lie. In the primary, Helstoski polled 20,189 to 18,520 against Baer, winning as a result of 2,000 absentee ballots that had nearly a unanimous vote for Helstoski. Fraud allegations resulted, and a judge ordered the absentee ballots to be impounded for the time being. The challenge by Baer dragged on for months, until New Jersey Superior Court Judge John Marzulli ordered that a new primary election be held on September 21. In the new election, Helstoski captured 55% of the vote, and was proclaimed the Democratic candidate for the election against Harold Hollenbeck, a state assemblyman and senator. Hollenbeck ended up winning the election against Helstoski, capturing a 54%-46% margin.

The Supreme Court ruled against government lawyers on several of the counts, and the others were dropped. One of Helstoski's outside counsel, Alfred Porro, was indicted, convicted and sentenced to six years in the Lewisburg Federal Prison Camp.

=== Life after Congress ===
After failing in his re-election bid, Helstoski ran again in the 1978 election as an independent, winning only 13% of the vote. He ran in the Democratic primary in 1980, but lost to Gabriel Ambrosio, who lost the general election to Hollenbeck.

In 1981, Helstoski became the superintendent of the North Bergen School District, and held that position until 1985. He later served as a public relations consultant.

=== Death ===
Helstoski died on December 16, 1999, at the age of 74, in Wayne, New Jersey.

U.S. House of Representatives
Preceded by Frank C. Osmers, Jr.	Member of the U.S. House of Representatives from New Jersey's 9th congressional district 1965-1977	Succeeded by Harold C. Hollenbeck
