= Joseph P. Merlino =

American politician (1922–1998)

106th President of the New Jersey Senate
- In office January 10, 1978 – January 12, 1982
- Preceded by: Matthew Feldman
- Succeeded by: Carmen A. Orechio

Member of the New Jersey Senate
- In office January 11, 1972 – January 12, 1982
- Preceded by: District created
- Succeeded by: John P. Gallagher
- Constituency: District 6B (1972–1974); 13th district (1974–1982)

Member of the New Jersey General Assembly from District 6B
- In office January 9, 1968 – January 11, 1972
- Preceded by: District created
- Succeeded by: Francis J. McManimon

Personal details
- Born: July 12, 1922 Trenton, New Jersey, U.S.
- Died: October 7, 1998 (aged 76) Princeton, New Jersey, U.S.
- Party: Democratic

Joseph P. Merlino (July 12, 1922 – October 7, 1998) was an American Democratic Party politician who served as President of the New Jersey Senate from 1978 to 1981.

== Background ==
Merlino was born in 1922 in Trenton, New Jersey, the son of Pasquale and Margarita (Fuccello) Merlino. He attended Trenton Central High School and then served in the U.S. Army, mainly in the Mediterranean area. He received a bachelor's degree from Seton Hall College in 1948 and a law degree from Fordham University in 1951.

From 1956 until 1989, he was the senior partner in the Trenton law firm of Merlino, Rottkamp & Flacks and its predecessors. He served as assistant prosecutor for Mercer County for seven years and as Trenton city attorney from 1966 to 1970.

On October 7, 1998, Merlino died from complications of heart disease and diabetes at the Forrestal Nursing and Rehabilitation Center in Princeton; he was 76.

== Political career ==
=== State legislature ===
In 1967, Merlino was elected to the New Jersey General Assembly and was re-elected in 1969, both times from District 6B alongside S. Howard Woodson. He was then elected to the New Jersey Senate from District 6B in 1971 and re-elected in 1973 and 1977 from the 13th district. He was assistant Senate majority leader from 1974 to 1975; majority leader from 1976 to 1977; and president of the Senate from 1978 to 1981.

As Majority Leader and Senate President, Merlino pushed through many legislative programs favored by Governor Brendan Byrne, a longtime political ally. Among this legislation was the state's graduated income tax (passed in 1976) and the Pinelands Protection Act (enacted in 1979, authorizing the New Jersey Pinelands National Reserve).

=== 1981 gubernatorial campaign ===
In 1981, Merlino ran in the Democratic primary for Governor of New Jersey. The crowded field of 13 Democratic candidates included U.S. Representative James Florio, Newark Mayor Kenneth A. Gibson, U.S. Representative Robert A. Roe, Attorney General John J. Degnan, and Jersey City Mayor Thomas F. X. Smith. Merlino finished in fourth place with 11 percent of the vote behind Florio (26 percent), Roe (16 percent), and Gibson (16 percent).

In January 1982, Merlino was nearly appointed to the United States Senate to succeed Harrison A. Williams. Williams, who had been convicted on federal bribery charges and faced expulsion from the Senate, was under intense pressure from Democratic Party leadership to resign. He refused to do so, and at the inauguration of Republican governor-elect Thomas Kean on January 19, 1982, outgoing governor Brendan Byrne attended with a letter appointing Merlino to the seat, addressed to Secretary of State Donald Lan, in his suit pocket. Lan was ordered to remain at Byrne’s side until the moment Kean took office, just in case Williams resigned at the last minute. However, Williams did not resign until March 11, and Kean appointed Nicholas F. Brady, a fellow Republican, to the vacant seat.

=== 1982 congressional campaign ===
In 1982, Merlino ran for the House of Representatives in the newly redistricted 4th Congressional District. Merlino was expected to coast to victory over the 29-year-old freshman Republican incumbent, Chris Smith, whose 1980 win over Frank Thompson (indicted in the Abscam operation) was seen as a fluke. At the end of one of their debates, Smith approached Merlino to exchange pleasantries. Merlino was quoted as saying "Beat it, kid." Smith won the election with 53% of the vote.

New Jersey General Assembly
Preceded by Constituency established	Member of the New Jersey General Assembly from the 6B district January 9, 1968–January 11, 1972	Succeeded by Francis J. McManimon
New Jersey Senate
Preceded by Constituency established	Member of the New Jersey Senate from the 6B district January 11, 1972–January 8, 1974	Succeeded by Constituency abolished
Preceded by Constituency established	Member of the New Jersey Senate from the 13th district January 8, 1974–January 12, 1982	Succeeded by John P. Gallagher
Political offices
Preceded by Matthew Feldman	President of the New Jersey Senate; January 10, 1978–January 12, 1982	Succeeded by Carmen A. Orechio
