= S. Howard Woodson =

American politician

President of the New Jersey Civil Service Commission
- In office September 23, 1976 – March 23, 1982
- Preceded by: James A. Alloway
- Succeeded by: Eugene J. McCaffrey

Speaker of the New Jersey General Assembly
- In office 1974–1976
- Preceded by: Thomas Kean
- Succeeded by: Joseph A. LeFante

Member of the New Jersey General Assembly
- In office 1964–1976
- Preceded by: Vince Parano
- Succeeded by: Helen Chiarello Szabo
- Constituency: Mercer (1963–68); District 6B (1968–72); 13th district (1972–76)

Member of the Trenton City Council
- In office 1962–1963

Personal details
- Born: Samuel Howard Woodson, Jr. May 8, 1916 Philadelphia, Pennsylvania, U.S.
- Died: July 28, 1999 (aged 83) Trenton, New Jersey, U.S.
- Resting place: Ewing Cemetery; Ewing, New Jersey
- Party: Democratic
- Education: Cheyney Training School for Teachers; Morehouse College; Atlanta University

Samuel Howard Woodson, Jr. (May 8, 1916 – July 28, 1999) was an American pastor, civil rights leader, and Democratic Party politician from New Jersey. He was the first African American to be elected Speaker of the New Jersey General Assembly.

== Early life and education ==
Born in Philadelphia, Woodson attended public schools there and received a B.S. degree in education from Cheyney Training School for Teachers (now Cheyney University of Pennsylvania). In 1940 he became the first graduate student to matriculate into the School of Divinity at Morehouse College in Atlanta. While there he served as an assistant to the pastor of the Wheat Street Baptist Church. He received a B.D. degree from Morehouse, the first graduate degree ever offered at the school. He continued postgraduate work in sociology at Atlanta University.

== Civil rights activism ==
Woodson was ordained as a minister in 1941 and was called as pastor of the Grace Temple Baptist Church in Lawnside, New Jersey in 1944. He moved to Trenton, New Jersey in 1946, serving as pastor of the Shiloh Baptist Church, where he would remain for 53 years.

In Trenton Woodson was active in the civil rights movement as President of the local branch of the NAACP. In 1960 he was elected President of the State Conference of the NAACP. He persuaded Gov. Richard J. Hughes to convene a summit to address the need for minority home ownership, leading to progressive housing legislation prohibiting the practice of blockbusting by banks seeking to deny mortgages to minority applicants.

== Political career ==
Woodson was elected to the Trenton City Council in 1962, the first African American elected to office in Mercer County, New Jersey. In 1964, he narrowly won a special election to complete the New Jersey General Assembly term of Vince Parano, defeating Republican Sidney Souter by 5,368 votes. He would serve for thirteen consecutive years. Woodson was minority leader in 1968-1969 and associate leader for the 1972 session.

=== Speaker of the Assembly ===
At the start of the Assembly session in 1972, Democratic leadership had wanted to name Woodson as Speaker, until Assemblyman David Friedland made a deal as one of four Democrats who voted to give the minority Republicans control of the General Assembly, electing Thomas Kean as Assembly Speaker. Woodson would have been the Assembly's first African American Speaker, and charges of racism were leveled by fellow Democrats against Friedland.

When Democrats gained control of the Assembly in 1974, Woodson was chosen as speaker, making him the first African American to hold a state house speakership since Reconstruction.

=== Election results ===
1964 New Jersey General Assembly special election (Mercer)
| Party | Candidate | Votes | % |
|---|---|---|---|
| Democratic | S. Howard Woodson | 51,623 | 45.81% |
| Republican | Sidney S. Souter | 46,255 | 41.13% |
| An Experienced Legislator | Richard L. Gray | 14,579 | 12.96% |
| Total votes | | 112,457 | 100.00% |

== Later work and death ==
Woodson resigned from the Assembly in 1976 when Gov. Brendan Byrne appointed him president of the New Jersey Civil Service Commission (later known as the Merit Review Board), a position he held until 1982. In 1978 Woodson admitted that he had not filed state or federal income tax returns for the previous two years. Woodson was ordered by Byrne to take an unpaid leave of absence while the matter was being investigated, but it was discovered that he did not owe any back taxes and was in fact due a refund.

In 1990, Gov. James Florio appointed Woodson to serve as Director of the Division of Equal Employment Opportunity/Affirmative Action (EEO/AA). He retired from the position in 1994.

Woodson died on July 28, 1999, at a hospital in Trenton at the age of 83.

Political offices
| Preceded by Thomas Kean | Speaker of the New Jersey General Assembly; 1974 – 1976 | Succeeded by Joseph A. LeFante |
