= Bill Flynn (New Jersey politician) =

American politician

William E. Flynn

Member of the New Jersey General Assembly
- In office January 8, 1974 – January 14, 1986 Serving with Richard Van Wagner and Jacqueline Walker
- Preceded by: District created
- Succeeded by: Joseph Azzolina; Joann H. Smith
- Constituency: 12th District (1974–1982); 13th District (1982–1986)

Personal details
- Born: February 3, 1938 (age 88) Perth Amboy, New Jersey
- Party: Democratic
- Spouse: Elaine Flynn

William E. Flynn (born February 3, 1938) is an American politician who served in the New Jersey General Assembly from 1974 to 1986. He had also served as mayor of Old Bridge Township.

Born and raised in Perth Amboy, New Jersey, Flynn graduated from Perth Amboy High School, before attending Trenton State College (since renamed as The College of New Jersey) and Rutgers Law School.

He is married to Elaine Flynn, the Middlesex County Clerk.

New Jersey General Assembly
Preceded by District created	Member of the New Jersey General Assembly from the 12th district January 8, 1974–January 12, 1982	Succeeded by Marie Sheehan Muhler
Preceded by Gerald R. Stockman	Member of the New Jersey General Assembly from the 13th district January 12, 1982–January 14, 1986	Succeeded by Joann H. Smith
