= Alfred D. Schiaffo =

American politician

Member of the New Jersey Senate from the 13th district
- In office January 9, 1968 – November 29, 1973
- Preceded by: District created
- Succeeded by: District abolished

Personal details
- Born: June 22, 1920 New York City, New York
- Died: November 5, 1988 (aged 68) Englewood, New Jersey
- Party: Republican

Alfred D. Schiaffo (June 22, 1920 – November 5, 1988) was an American politician who served in the New Jersey Senate from the 13th district from 1968 to 1973.

He attended John Marshall Law School.

In 1976, he was nominated by Governor Brendan T. Byrne to serve as a judge on New Jersey Superior Court.

A resident of Hackensack, he died on November 5, 1988, at Englewood Hospital in Englewood, New Jersey at age 68.
