= Harry Randall Jr. =

American lawyer (1927–2013)

Harry Randall Jr. (January 30, 1927 – May 2, 2013) was an American Republican Party politician from New Jersey who served in the New Jersey General Assembly from 1962 to 1966 and from 1968 to 1970, after which he served as a member of the Bergen County Board of Chosen Freeholders.

== Electoral history ==
He served as a Councilman in Westwood, New Jersey before winning a seat in the State Assembly in 1961. He was re-elected in 1963. He ran for State Senator in 1965, but lost the Republican primary. He ran again for Assemblyman in 1967 and won. He did not seek re-election in 1969. In 1973, he ran for State Senator in Bergen County District 39, but lost to Democrat Raymond Garramone. He later served on the Bergen County Board of Freeholders.

== Personal ==
Randall was born on January 30, 1927, in Oradell, New Jersey and grew up in nearby Westwood.

He served as a translator in the United States Army during World War II, after receiving training in Japanese at Princeton University, the University of Minnesota and Yale University. After completing his military service, he attended Dartmouth College and received a law degree from Rutgers School of Law–Newark.

His daughter, Elizabeth Randall, later held the Assembly seat from the 39th Legislative District, while his son Thomas has served as mayor of Ho-Ho-Kus.
