= Joseph C. Woodcock =

American politician

Joseph C. Woodcock Jr.

Member of the New Jersey Senate
- In office 1968–1973

Member of the New Jersey General Assembly
- In office 1962–1968

Personal details
- Born: November 20, 1925 Cliffside Park, New Jersey
- Died: November 2, 1997 (aged 71)
- Party: Republican
- Education: Cliffside Park High School
- Alma mater: Rutgers University; University of Pennsylvania

Joseph C. Woodcock Jr. (November 20, 1925 – November 2, 1997) was an American Republican Party politician who served in the New Jersey General Assembly, the New Jersey Senate, and as Bergen County Prosecutor. He served in the Assembly for six years, from 1962 - 1967, and in the State Senate for six years, from 1968 - 1973. Woodcock was defeated in 1973 for a third term in the Senate. After the election, he resigned his seat to become Bergen County Prosecutor. In 1977, Woodcock entered the NJ gubernatorial race but withdrew before the primary when Bergen County GOP party leadership failed to endorse him. The following year, Woodcock led an insurgent ticket of Republican candidates, challenging Bergen County GOP party leadership in the 1978 Republican Primary. He ran for the US House of Representatives, District 7 GOP nomination but was defeated by the party-endorsed candidate, Margaret Roukema, who ultimately lost to the Democratic incumbent in November.

Woodcock was born in Cliffside Park, New Jersey. He graduated from Cliffside Park High School and Rutgers University. Woodcock earned his law degree at the University of Pennsylvania and was a member of the New Jersey and American Bar Associations. He was also a member of the New Jersey Superior Court Ethics Commission. The son of a former Cliffside Park mayor, Woodcock served on the town council from 1957-58 and as the borough attorney in 1959. He also ran for mayor in 1959 but was defeated.
