= Marion West Higgins =

American politician

Marion West Higgins (January 9, 1915 – December 24, 1991) was an American Republican Party politician who served as the first female Speaker of the New Jersey General Assembly. She was only the third woman (after Minnie D. Craig of North Dakota and Consuelo N. Bailey of Vermont) to serve as speaker of a state House of Representatives in the United States. She also served as Acting Governor of New Jersey in early 1965.

== Biography ==
Higgins was born in 1915 in New Rochelle, New York to Marion (Speaks) and Dr. James E. West. Her father was the first Chief Scout Executive of the Boy Scouts of America, serving from 1911 to 1943. She attended New Rochelle High School before entering Mount Holyoke College, where she graduated with a degree in political science in 1936. In 1941 she married William F. Higgins, and in 1949 they moved to Hillsdale, New Jersey to open a real estate and insurance business.

Higgins became involved in Bergen County Republican politics, and in 1959 she was elected to the New Jersey General Assembly, where she served three terms. In 1964 she was selected as majority leader, and in 1965 she was selected as Speaker. When Governor Richard J. Hughes was out of the state in January 1965, Higgins became Acting Governor. Normally, New Jersey Senate President Charles W. Sandman, Jr. would have taken the post, as he stood first in the line of succession to the governorship. However, Sandman absented himself from the state so that Higgins would be accorded the honor of serving as the first woman to lead the state.

Higgins ran for State Senate in 1965 on the Republican Party's Bergen County slate, but all four Republican candidates went down to defeat in the general election, as Democrats took control of both houses of the Legislature.

After her tenure in the Assembly, Higgins continued to operate the Hillsdale real estate business with her husband. In 1973 she followed in her father's footsteps by becoming a member of the Bergen County Council of the Boy Scouts of America. She was also the first woman to serve on the board of Orange and Rockland Utilities, Inc.

In 1991, at the age of 76, Higgins died at Pascack Valley Hospital in Westwood, New Jersey after suffering injuries in a car accident in Hillsdale. She is buried at Maryrest Cemetery in Mahwah.

Political offices
| Preceded by Alfred N. Beadleston | Speaker of the New Jersey General Assembly; 1965 | Succeeded by Maurice V. Brady |
