= 2013 New Jersey General Assembly election =

New Jersey election

- November 5, 2013

All 80 seats in the New Jersey General Assembly 41 seats needed for a majority
- Turnout: 40% (▲13pp)
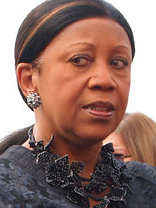

	Majority party	Minority party
Leader	Sheila Oliver (stepped down)	Jon Bramnick
Party	Democratic	Republican
Leader since	January 12, 2010	January 17, 2012
Leader's seat	34th (East Orange)	21st (Westfield)
Last election	48	32
Seats won	48	32
Seat change	Steady	Steady
Popular vote	1,828,078	1,907,361
Percentage	48.7%	50.7%
Swing	▼2.5%	▲2.7%
- Results: Democratic hold Democratic gain Republican hold Republican gain
Speaker before election
Sheila Oliver
Democratic
Elected Speaker
Vincent Prieto
Democratic

All 80 seats in the General Assembly were up for election this year. In each Legislative district, there are two people elected; the top two winners in the general election are the ones sent to the Assembly. Typically, the two members of each party run as a team in each election. After the previous election, Democrats captured 48 seats while the Republicans won 32 seats.

Democrats flipped one seat in the 2nd district and Republicans flipped one in the 1st district, leaving the balance of power unchanged at 48–32, despite Democrats losing the popular vote. This remains the last election in which the party that won control of the General Assembly did not win a majority of votes.

== Incumbents not seeking re-election ==
=== Democratic ===
- Peter J. Barnes III, District 18 (ran for State Senate)
- Alberto Coutinho, District 29 (resigned September 11)
- Ruben Ramos, District 33 (ran for mayor of Hoboken)
- Sean Connors, District 33
- Connie Wagner, District 38 (lost party support for renomination)

=== Republican ===
- Scott Rudder, District 8
- Robert Schroeder, District 39

== Overall results ==
Summary of the November 5, 2013, New Jersey General Assembly election results:

↓
48	32
Democratic	Republican

Parties	Candidates	Seats				Popular Vote		
Parties	Candidates	2011	2013	+/-	Strength	Vote	%	Change
Democratic	78	48	48	Steady	60%	1,828,078	48.7%	0.0%
Republican	80	32	32	Steady	40%	1,907,361	50.8%	0.0%
Green	1	0	0	Steady	0%	796	0.02%	0.0%
Libertarian	2	0	0	Steady	0%	1,677	0.04%	0.0%
Independent	5	0	0	Steady	0%	17,451	0.4%	0.0%
Total	166	80	80	0	100.0%	3,755,363	100.0%	-

== Summary of results by district ==
Legislative District	2012 Pres.	Incumbent	Party	Elected Assembly Member	Party
1st	D+6.16	Nelson Albano	Democrat	Sam Fiocchi	Republican
1st	D+6.16	Bob Andrzejczak	Democrat	Bob Andrzejczak	Democratic
2nd	D+20.84	Chris A. Brown	Republican	Chris A. Brown	Republican
2nd	D+20.84	John F. Amodeo	Republican	Vincent Mazzeo	Democrat
3rd	D+11.24	John J. Burzichelli	Democrat	John J. Burzichelli	Democrat
3rd	D+11.24	Celeste Riley	Democrat	Celeste Riley	Democrat
4th	D+23.24	Paul D. Moriarty	Democrat	Paul D. Moriarty	Democrat
4th	D+23.24	Gabriela Mosquera	Democrat	Gabriela Mosquera	Democrat
5th	D+39.94	Angel Fuentes	Democrat	Angel Fuentes	Democrat
5th	D+39.94	Gilbert Wilson	Democrat	Gilbert Wilson	Democrat
6th	D+29.54	Louis Greenwald	Democrat	Louis Greenwald	Democrat
6th	D+29.54	Pamela Rosen Lampitt	Democrat	Pamela Rosen Lampitt	Democrat
7th	D+28.38	Herb Conaway	Democrat	Herb Conaway	Democrat
7th	D+28.38	Troy Singleton	Democrat	Troy Singleton	Democrat
8th	D+7.31	Scott Rudder	Republican	Maria Rodriguez-Gregg	Republican
8th	D+7.31	Christopher J. Brown	Republican	Christopher J. Brown	Republican
9th	R+11.05	Brian E. Rumpf	Republican	Brian E. Rumpf	Republican
9th	R+11.05	DiAnne Gove	Republican	DiAnne Gove	Republican
10th	R+14.06	Gregory P. McGuckin	Republican	Gregory P. McGuckin	Republican
10th	R+14.06	David W. Wolfe	Republican	David W. Wolfe	Republican
11th	D+11.04	Mary Pat Angelini	Republican	Mary Pat Angelini	Republican
11th	D+11.04	Caroline Casagrande	Republican	Caroline Casagrande	Republican
12th	R+6.14	Ronald S. Dancer	Republican	Ronald S. Dancer	Republican
12th	R+6.14	Robert D. Clifton	Republican	Robert D. Clifton	Republican
13th	R+10.33	Declan O'Scanlon	Republican	Declan O'Scanlon	Republican
13th	R+10.33	Amy Handlin	Republican	Amy Handlin	Republican
14th	D+16.12	Wayne DeAngelo	Democrat	Wayne DeAngelo	Democrat
14th	D+16.12	Daniel R. Benson	Democrat	Daniel R. Benson	Democrat
15th	D+46.7	Bonnie Watson Coleman	Democrat	Bonnie Watson Coleman	Democrat
15th	D+46.7	Reed Gusciora	Democrat	Reed Gusciora	Democrat
16th	D+7.65	Donna Simon	Republican	Donna Simon	Republican
16th	D+7.65	Jack Ciattarelli	Republican	Jack Ciattarelli	Republican
17th	D+45.69	Upendra Chivukula	Democrat	Upendra Chivukula	Democrat
17th	D+45.69	Joseph V. Egan	Democrat	Joseph V. Egan	Democrat
18th	D+22.64	Peter J. Barnes III	Democrat	Nancy Pinkin	Democrat
18th	D+22.64	Patrick J. Diegnan	Democrat	Patrick J. Diegnan	Democrat
19th	D+34.78	Craig Coughlin	Democrat	Craig Coughlin	Democrat
19th	D+34.78	John Wisniewski	Democrat	John Wisniewski	Democrat
20th	D+60.96	Annette Quijano	Democrat	Annette Quijano	Democrat
20th	D+60.96	Joseph Cryan	Democrat	Joseph Cryan	Democrat
21st	R+5.80	Jon Bramnick	Republican	Jon Bramnick	Republican
21st	R+5.80	Nancy Munoz	Republican	Nancy Munoz	Republican
22nd	D+36.46	Linda Stender	Democrat	Linda Stender	Democrat
22nd	D+36.46	Gerald Green	Democrat	Gerald Green	Democrat
23rd	R+11.68	Erik Peterson	Republican	Erik Peterson	Republican
23rd	R+11.68	John DiMaio	Republican	John DiMaio	Republican
24th	R+20.64	Parker Space	Republican	Parker Space	Republican
24th	R+20.64	Alison Littell McHose	Republican	Alison Littell McHose	Republican
25th	R+8.32	Tony Bucco	Republican	Tony Bucco	Republican
25th	R+8.32	Michael Patrick Carroll	Republican	Michael Patrick Carroll	Republican
26th	R+10.79	BettyLou DeCroce	Republican	BettyLou DeCroce	Republican
26th	R+10.79	Jay Webber	Republican	Jay Webber	Republican
27th	D+14.73	John F. McKeon	Democrat	John F. McKeon	Democrat
27th	D+14.73	Mila Jasey	Democrat	Mila Jasey	Democrat
28th	D+66.45	Cleopatra Tucker	Democrat	Cleopatra Tucker	Democrat
28th	D+66.45	Ralph R. Caputo	Democrat	Ralph R. Caputo	Democrat
29th	D+66.45	Alberto Coutinho	Democrat	Eliana Pintor Marin	Democrat
29th	D+66.45	L. Grace Spencer	Democrat	L. Grace Spencer	Democrat
30th	R+26.01	Sean T. Kean	Republican	Sean T. Kean	Republican
30th	R+26.01	Dave Rible	Republican	Dave Rible	Republican
31st	D+62.87	Charles Mainor	Democrat	Charles Mainor	Democrat
31st	D+62.87	Jason O'Donnell	Democrat	Jason O'Donnell	Democrat
32nd	D+48.62	Angelica M. Jimenez	Democrat	Angelica M. Jimenez	Democrat
32nd	D+48.62	Vincent Prieto	Democrat	Vincent Prieto	Democrat
33rd	D+54.92	Sean Connors	Democrat	Carmelo Garcia	Democrat
33rd	D+54.92	Ruben Ramos	Democrat	Raj Mukherji	Democrat
34th	D+64.83	Thomas P. Giblin	Democrat	Thomas P. Giblin	Democrat
34th	D+64.83	Sheila Oliver	Democrat	Sheila Oliver	Democrat
35th	D+64.89	Shavonda E. Sumter	Democrat	Shavonda E. Sumter	Democrat
35th	D+64.89	Benjie E. Wimberly	Democrat	Benjie E. Wimberly	Democrat
36th	D+27.35	Gary Schaer	Democrat	Gary Schaer	Democrat
36th	D+27.35	Marlene Caride	Democrat	Marlene Caride	Democrat
37th	D+37.01	Gordon M. Johnson	Democrat	Gordon M. Johnson	Democrat
37th	D+37.01	Valerie Huttle	Democrat	Valerie Huttle	Democrat
38th	D+10.05	Connie Wagner	Democrat	Joseph Lagana	Democrat
38th	D+10.05	Tim Eustace	Democrat	Tim Eustace	Democrat
39th	R+9.39	Holly Schepisi	Republican	Holly Schepisi	Republican
39th	R+9.39	Robert Schroeder	Republican	Robert Auth	Republican
40th	R+11.68	Scott Rumana	Republican	Scott Rumana	Republican
40th	R+11.68	David C. Russo	Republican	David C. Russo	Republican

=== Close races ===
Districts where the difference of total votes between the top-two parties was under 10%:

1. District 38, 0.4%
2. District 2, 0.44% Gain D
3. District 1, 0.8%% Gain R
4. District 27, 1.8%
5. District 14, 7.4%
6. District 18, 6.6%
7. District 3, 9.8%

== List of races ==
Voters in each legislative district elect two members to the New Jersey General Assembly.

=== District 1 ===
1st Legislative District general election
Party	Candidate	Votes	%
Democratic	Bob Andrzejczak (incumbent)	29,958	27.2
Republican	Sam Fiocchi	27,539	25.0
Democratic	Nelson Albano (incumbent)	26,611	24.2
Republican	Kristine Gabor	25,903	23.5
Total votes		110,011	100.0
One Republican gain from Democratic			

=== District 2 ===
2nd Legislative District general election
Party	Candidate	Votes	%
Republican	Chris A. Brown	26,022	26.5
Democratic	Vince Mazzeo	25,182	24.77
Republican	John F. Amodeo (incumbent)	25,131	24.72
Democratic	Nick Russo	23,921	23.6
Brownie Plus Me	Gary Stein	1,394	1.4
Total votes		101,650	100.0
One Democratic gain from Republican			

=== District 3 ===
3rd Legislative District general election
Party	Candidate	Votes	%
Democratic	John J. Burzichelli (incumbent)	31,049	28.0
Democratic	Celeste Riley (incumbent)	29,870	26.9
Republican	Larry Wallace	25,094	22.6
Republican	Bob Vanderslice	24,823	22.4
Total votes		110,836	100.0
Democratic hold			

=== District 4 ===
4th Legislative District general election
Party	Candidate	Votes	%
Democratic	Paul D. Moriarty (incumbent)	28,527	29.0
Democratic	Gabriela Mosquera (incumbent)	27,095	27.6
Republican	Philip Dieser	21,702	22.1
Republican	Theodore M. Liddell	20,998	21.4
Total votes		98,322	100.0
Democratic hold			

=== District 5 ===
5th Legislative District general election
Party	Candidate	Votes	%
Democratic	Angel Fuentes (incumbent)	25,167	29.7
Democratic	Gilbert Wilson (incumbent)	24,761	29.2
Republican	Davis Ragonese	17,774	21.0
Republican	George Wagoner	17,037	20.1
Total votes		84,739	100.0
Democratic hold			

=== District 6 ===
6th Legislative District general election
Party	Candidate	Votes	%
Democratic	Louis Greenwald (incumbent)	33,232	30.7
Democratic	Pamela Rosen Lampitt (incumbent)	31,366	29.0
Republican	Chris Leone-Zwillinger	22,147	20.5
Republican	George R. Fisher	21,399	19.8
Total votes		108,144	100.0
Democratic hold			

=== District 7 ===
7th Legislative District general election
Party	Candidate	Votes	%
Democratic	Herb Conaway (incumbent)	34,978	28.0
Democratic	Troy Singleton (incumbent)	34,772	27.8
Republican	Anthony Ogozalak	27,991	22.4
Republican	Jeff Banasz	27,233	21.8
Total votes		124,974	100.0
Democratic hold			

=== District 8 ===
8th Legislative District general election
Party	Candidate	Votes	%
Republican	Christopher J. Brown (incumbent)	34,293	31.0
Republican	Maria Rodriguez-Gregg	32,360	29.2
Democratic	Robert McGowan	22,461	20.3
Democratic	Ava Markey	21,665	19.6
Total votes		110,779	100.0
Republican hold			

=== District 9 ===
9th Legislative District general election
Party	Candidate	Votes	%
Republican	Brian E. Rumpf (incumbent)	45,690	35.5
Republican	DiAnne Gove (incumbent)	43,695	34.0
Democratic	Christopher J. McManus	20,354	15.8
Democratic	Peter Ferwerda III	18,872	14.7
Total votes		128,611	100.0
Republican hold			

=== District 10 ===
10th Legislative District general election
Party	Candidate	Votes	%
Republican	David W. Wolfe (incumbent)	42,627	35.0
Republican	Gregory P. McGuckin	42,586	33.4
Democratic	Susan Kane	20,647	16.2
Democratic	Amber Gesstein	19,658	15.4
Total votes		127,518	100.0
Republican hold			

=== District 11 ===
11th Legislative District general election
Party	Candidate	Votes	%
Republican	Mary Pat Angelini (incumbent)	29,842	30.1
Republican	Caroline Casagrande (incumbent)	28,827	29.1
Democratic	Kevin McMillan	20,406	20.6
Democratic	Edward Zipprich	19,968	20.2
Total votes		99,043	100.0
Republican hold			

=== District 12 ===
12th Legislative District general election
Party	Candidate	Votes	%
Republican	Ronald S. Dancer (incumbent)	32,188	32.8
Republican	Robert D. Clifton (incumbent)	31,069	31.7
Democratic	Lawrence J. Furman	17,119	17.5
Democratic	Nicholas Nellegar	16,312	16.6
For the People	Daine Bindler	1,354	1.4
Total votes		98,032	100.0
Republican hold			

=== District 13 ===
13th Legislative District general election
Party	Candidate	Votes	%
Republican	Amy Handlin (incumbent)	38,795	33.5
Republican	Declan O'Scanlon (incumbent)	37,577	32.5
Democratic	Allison Friedman	19,623	17.0
Democratic	Matthew Morehead	18,843	16.3
Green Party	Anne Zeletel	796	0.7
Total votes		115,634	100.0
Republican hold			

=== District 14 ===
14th Legislative District general election
Party	Candidate	Votes	%
Democratic	Wayne DeAngelo (incumbent)	32,048	27.0
Democratic	Daniel R. Benson (incumbent)	30,992	26.0
Republican	Steve Cook	28,135	23.6
Republican	Ronald Haas	26,233	22.0
Libertarian	Sean O'Connor	898	0.8
Libertarian	Steven Uccio	779	0.7
Total votes		119,085	100.0
Democratic hold			

=== District 15 ===
15th Legislative District general election
Party	Candidate	Votes	%
Democratic	Bonnie Watson Coleman (incumbent)	29,109	31.4
Democratic	Reed Gusciora (incumbent)	28,848	31.1
Republican	Anthony Giordano	17,429	18.8
Republican	Kim Taylor	17,310	18.7
Total votes		92,696	100.0
Democratic hold			

=== District 16 ===
16th Legislative District general election
Party	Candidate	Votes	%
Republican	Jack Ciattarelli	32,125	28.6
Republican	Donna Simon (incumbent)	31,543	28.0
Democratic	Marie Corfield	25,112	22.3
Democratic	Ida Ochoteco	23,682	21.1
Total votes		112,462	100.0
Republican hold			

=== District 17 ===
17th Legislative District general election
Party	Candidate	Votes	%
Democratic	Joseph V. Egan (incumbent)	23,763	32.5
Democratic	Upendra Chivukula (incumbent)	23,331	31.9
Republican	Carlo DiLalla	13,762	18.8
Republican	Sanjay Patel	12,281	16.8
Total votes		73,137	100.0
Democratic hold			

=== District 18 ===
18th Legislative District general election
Party	Candidate	Votes	%
Democratic	Patrick J. Diegnan (incumbent)	24,996	27.1
Democratic	Nancy Pinkin	24,186	26.2
Republican	Robert A. Bengivenga Jr.	21,517	23.3
Republican	Lisa Goldhammer	20,559	22.3
United We Stand	Sheila Angalet	1,068	1.2
Total votes		92,326	100.0
Democratic hold			

=== District 19 ===
19th Legislative District general election
Party	Candidate	Votes	%
Democratic	John Wisniewski (incumbent)	24,404	33.7
Democratic	Craig Coughlin (incumbent)	22,393	30.9
Republican	Stephanie Ziemba	13,405	18.5
Republican	Arif Khan	12,161	16.8
Total votes		72,354	100.0
Democratic hold			

=== District 20 ===
20th Legislative District general election
Party	Candidate	Votes	%
Democratic	Joseph Cryan (incumbent)	19,268	36.3
Democratic	Annette Quijano (incumbent)	18,839	35.5
Republican	Charles Donnelly	7,719	14.5
Republican	Christopher Hackett	7,269	13.7
Total votes		53,095	100.0
Democratic hold			

=== District 21 ===
21st Legislative District general election
Party	Candidate	Votes	%
Republican	Jon Bramnick (incumbent)	38,556	32.9
Republican	Nancy Munoz (incumbent)	37,314	31.9
Democratic	Jill Anne LaZare	21,129	18.1
Democratic	Norman Albert	20,045	17.1
Total votes		117,044	100.0
Republican hold			

=== District 22 ===
22nd Legislative District general election
Party	Candidate	Votes	%
Democratic	Linda Stender	23,242	28.2
Democratic	Jerry Green (incumbent)	23,168	28.2
Republican	John Campbell	18,826	22.9
Republican	Jeffery First	16,965	20.6
Total votes		82,201	100.0
Democratic hold			

=== District 23 ===
23rd Legislative District general election
Party	Candidate	Votes	%
Republican	Erik Peterson (incumbent)	35,604	33.8
Republican	John DiMaio (incumbent)	35,458	33.6
Democratic	John Valentine	17,828	16.9
Democratic	Ralph Drake	16,548	15.7
Total votes		105,438	100.0
Republican hold			

=== District 24 ===
24th Legislative District general election
Party	Candidate	Votes	%
Republican	Alison Littell McHose (incumbent)	37,399	36.0
Republican	Parker Space (incumbent)	35,093	33.8
Democratic	Susan Williams	16,883	16.3
Democratic	William Weightman	14,411	13.9
Total votes		103,786	100.0
Republican hold			

=== District 25 ===
25th Legislative District general election
Party	Candidate	Votes	%
Republican	Tony Bucco (incumbent)	35,536	43.0
Republican	Michael Patrick Carroll (incumbent)	33,393	40.4
Listen, Lead Succeed	Rebecca Feldman	9,209	11.2
Principle Before Politics	Jack Curtis	4,426	5.4
Total votes		82,564	100.0
Republican hold			

=== District 26 ===
26th Legislative District general election
Party	Candidate	Votes	%
Republican	BettyLou DeCroce (incumbent)	35,352	32.9
Republican	Jay Webber (incumbent)	35,028	32.6
Democratic	Elliot Isibor	18,720	17.4
Democratic	Joseph Raich	18,379	17.1
Total votes		107,479	100.0
Republican hold			

=== District 27 ===
27th Legislative District general election
Party	Candidate	Votes	%
Democratic	John F. McKeon (incumbent)	30,554	27.8
Democratic	Mila Jasey (incumbent)	29,345	23.1
Republican	Angelo Tedesco	25,378	22.5
Republican	Laura M. Ali	24,732	22.5
Total votes		110,009	100.0
Democratic hold			

=== District 28 ===
28th Legislative District general election
Party	Candidate	Votes	%
Democratic	Ralph R. Caputo (incumbent)	26,221	38.9
Democratic	Cleopatra Tucker (incumbent)	25,869	38.4
Republican	Peter Manning	7,875	11.7
Republican	James Boydston	7,452	11.1
Total votes		67,417	100.0
Democratic hold			

=== District 29 ===
29th Legislative District general election
Party	Candidate	Votes	%
Democratic	L. Grace Spencer (incumbent)	15,259	41.1
Democratic	Eliana Pintor Marin	14,465	38.3
Republican	Aracelis Sanabria Tejada	3,957	10.5
Republican	Elaine Guarino	3,903	10.3
Total votes		37,764	100.0
Democratic hold			

=== District 30 ===
30th Legislative District general election
Party	Candidate	Votes	%
Republican	Sean T. Kean (incumbent)	39,702	38.2
Republican	Dave Rible (incumbent)	37,252	35.9
Democratic	Jimmy Esposito	13,898	13.4
Democratic	Lorelei Rouvrais	12,967	12.5
Total votes		103,819	100.0
Republican hold			

=== District 31 ===
31st Legislative District general election
Party	Candidate	Votes	%
Democratic	Jason O'Donnell (incumbent)	17,954	36.9
Democratic	Charles Mainor (incumbent)	17,877	36.8
Republican	Gerard Pizzillo	6,471	13.3
Republican	Juanita Lopez	6,342	13.0
Total votes		48,644	100.0
Democratic hold			

=== District 32 ===
32nd Legislative District general election
Party	Candidate	Votes	%
Democratic	Vincent Prieto (incumbent)	19,885	36.2
Democratic	Angelica M. Jimenez (incumbent)	19,293	35.1
Republican	Lee Marie Gomez	7,923	14.4
Republican	Maria Malavasi-Quartello	7,874	14.3
Total votes		54,975	100.0
Democratic hold			

=== District 33 ===
33rd Legislative District general election
Party	Candidate	Votes	%
Democratic	Carmelo Garcia	20,681	37.5
Democratic	Raj Mukherji	19,029	34.5
Republican	Armando Hernandez	7,737	14.0
Republican	Jude Anthony Toscornia	7,691	13.9
Total votes		55,138	100.0
Democratic hold			

=== District 34 ===
34th Legislative District general election
Party	Candidate	Votes	%
Democratic	Sheila Oliver (incumbent)	27,095	38.0
Democratic	Thomas P. Giblin (incumbent)	26,802	37.6
Republican	Michael Urciouli	8,663	12.2
Republican	David Rios	8,654	12.2
Total votes		71,214	100.0
Democratic hold			

=== District 35 ===
35th Legislative District general election
Party	Candidate	Votes	%
Democratic	Benjie E. Wimberly	21,195	36.7
Democratic	Shavonda E. Sumter	20,791	36.0
Republican	Rhina Tavarez	7,968	13.7
Republican	Maria del Pilar Rivas	7,828	13.5
Total votes		57,782	100.0
Democratic hold			

=== District 36 ===
36th Legislative District general election
Party	Candidate	Votes	%
Democratic	Gary Schaer (incumbent)	21,131	29.2
Democratic	Marlene Caride	20,520	28.4
Republican	Rosina Romano	15,631	21.6
Republican	Foster Lowe	15,014	20.8
Total votes		72,296	100.0
Democratic hold			

=== District 37 ===
37th Legislative District general election
Party	Candidate	Votes	%
Democratic	Valerie Huttle (incumbent)	26,581	33.5
Democratic	Gordon M. Johnson (incumbent)	26,373	33.3
Republican	Gino Tessaro	13,338	16.8
Republican	Dierdre Paul	12,988	16.4
Total votes		79,280	100.0
Democratic hold			

=== District 38 ===
38th Legislative District general election
Party	Candidate	Votes	%
Democratic	Joseph Lagana	26,279	25.2
Democratic	Tim Eustace (incumbent)	26,021	25.0
Republican	Joseph Scarpa	25,965	24.9
Republican	Joan Fragala	25,836	24.8
Total votes		104,101	100.0
Democratic hold			

=== District 39 ===
39th Legislative District general election
Party	Candidate	Votes	%
Republican	Holly Schepisi (incumbent)	38,873	34.1
Republican	Robert Auth	33,680	29.6
Democratic	Donna Abene	22,450	19.7
Democratic	Anthony Iannarelli Jr.	20,785	18.3
Total votes		113,788	100.0
Republican hold			

=== District 40 ===
40th Legislative District general election
Party	Candidate	Votes	%
Republican	Scott Rumana (incumbent)	36,174	32.1
Republican	David C. Russo (incumbent)	36,143	32.1
Democratic	Anthony Galietti	20,779	18.4
Democratic	Leo Arcuri	19,542	17.3
Total votes		112,638	100.0
Republican hold			

== See also ==
- 2013 New Jersey elections
- 2013 New Jersey Senate election
