= Christopher DePhillips =

American attorney & politician (born 1965)

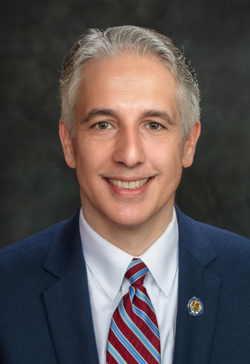

Member of the New Jersey General Assembly from the 40th district
- Incumbent
- Assumed office January 9, 2018 Serving with Kevin J. Rooney (2016–2024); Al Barlas (2024–present)
- Preceded by: David C. Russo

Commissioner of the Northwest Bergen County Utilities Authority
- In office June 25, 2012 – December 31, 2017
- Preceded by: Peter A. Dachnowicz
- Succeeded by: Brian Chewcaskie

Member of the Wyckoff Township Committee
- In office January 1, 2010 – January 1, 2013
- Preceded by: David C. Alnor
- Succeeded by: Haakon Jepsen

Personal details
- Born: March 30, 1965 (age 61)
- Party: Republican
- Education: Georgetown University; Seton Hall University School of Law
- Occupation: Attorney
- Website: Legislative webpage

Christopher P. DePhillips (born March 30, 1965) is an American attorney and Republican Party politician who has represented the 40th Legislative District in the New Jersey General Assembly since 2018. Since 2024, DePhillips has been the GOP conference leader, the third highest-ranking Republican in the NJ Assembly. He previously served as a committeeman and mayor in Wyckoff.

== Personal and early life ==
Christopher DePhillips was born in 1965 and lived in Northvale until 1968, when his family relocated to Old Tappan, where he grew up. The family attended a local Catholic parish and, in 1983, DePhillips graduated from Bergen Catholic High School. DePhillips said that politics has "always been in my DNA," as his parents were "proud Reagan Republicans" who both served on the Republican county committee in Old Tappan and instilled civic values. DePhillips' father was a civil engineer and the CEO of an engineering firm, and he worked as an assistant commissioner in the New Jersey Department of Transportation from 1970-1973 under Gov. William T. Cahill. DePhillips went on to earn a Bachelor of Arts degree with a major in government from Georgetown University in 1987 and a juris doctor degree from Seton Hall University School of Law in 1992. From 1987 to 1989, he worked in Washington, D.C. as an aide to Congresswoman Marge Roukema.

DePhillips now lives in Wyckoff. He served on the board of trustees of the Wyckoff Education Foundation and, in 2009, was elected to the Wyckoff Township Committee, serving from 2010 to 2013. He was unanimously selected by his fellow committeemen to serve as mayor in 2012. During DePhillips' term as mayor, Wyckoff purchased Russell Farms for $3.1 million and converted the five-acre property into a public park; he called the purchase "an historic moment for the township." He also supported a ban on "loud, unnecessary or unusual noise" in Wyckoff, saying it was "an ordinance that is designed to prevent disturbances of the peace."

In June 2012, DePhillips was appointed as a Commissioner of the Northwest Bergen County Utilities Authority, which provides sewage treatment services to 75,000 residents in Bergen County, serving until 2017.

DePhillips is a practicing attorney who has been a partner at Gibbons as well as Porzio Bromberg & Newman. From 2016 until 2024, DePhillips was chief operating officer and general counsel at Porzio Life Sciences, which was taken over by RLDatix in 2022. In April 2024, he returned to private practice, becoming an equity partner at the North Jersey law firm Bernstein DePhillips & Kalosieh.

== New Jersey Assembly ==
Since 2024, DePhillips has been GOP conference leader, the third highest-ranking Republican in the Assembly. DePhillips was first appointed to GOP caucus leadership in 2021, when he was named deputy Republican leader by leader Jon Bramnick.

In September 2026, following news that the MVC had accidentally registered 6,600 noncitizens as voters, DePhillips and fellow Republican Assemblyman John DiMaio introduced a resolution to create a bipartisan committee to investigate New Jersey's election integrity. The Assembly Speaker and Assembly Minority Leader would each appoint six members and name a co-chair, and the committee would be empowered to issue subpoenas, compel testimony, and collect evidence.

In June 2026, DePhillips stated that "my top priority in Trenton has always been cutting taxes and cutting spending," and he criticized Gov. Mikie Sherrill's $60.7 billion 2026 budget. In August 2026, he further rebuked the Sherrill administration for adding $490 million in last-minute supplemental spending to the initial budget, characterizing the additions as pork barrel spending that broke her campaign's "no-pork promise." He has introduced bills to cut New Jersey's corporate business tax from 11.5% to 2.5% over four years, rescind a 2.5% surcharge (dedicated to the NJ Transit budget) on businesses with earnings over $10 million, cut the sales tax from 6.625% to 6%, and increase the amount of rental payments that landlords would be eligible to deduct from their property taxes from 18% to 30%. DePhillips also argued that New Jersey should do more to assist seniors who cannot afford to remain in the state, sponsoring a bill that would triple the personal needs allowance for low-income nursing home residents.

In March 2026, DePhillips introduced a bill that would create a task force to recommend safety policies for special education students who ride school buses.

In June 2025, following the assassinations of Minnesota state legislators, DePhillips introduced a bill that would add state legislators to the list of New Jersey officials whose personal information is protected by Daniel’s Law, which already prohibited publishing the home addresses of judges and law enforcement.

In January 2025, DePhillips argued that NJ Transit suffered from poor organization, not a lack of funding. As a member of the Assembly Transportation Committee, DePhillips was a critic of NJ Transit president Kevin Corbett (who served from 2018-2025), calling on him to resign in November 2024.

In March 2022, DePhillips proposed articles of impeachment against New Jersey Secretary of Labor Robert Asaro-Angelo, citing unemployment backlogs and government office closures related to the COVID-19 Pandemic.

In December 2021, DePhillips introduced a bill that would allow vote-by-mail ballots to be counted as they are received. DePhillips stated that, "It is incumbent upon officials to fix the problems that lead to conspiracy theories. Earlier counting of mail-in votes will help address some of this year's hang-ups," referencing how, in 2021, New Jersey's gubernatorial race and some legislative races were too close to call on election night.

In February 2019, DePhillips introduced a bill that would abolish the New Jersey Schools Development Authority, but it never came to a vote in committee.

=== Committees ===
Committee assignments for the 2024—2025 Legislative Session are:

- Science, Innovation and Technology
- Transportation and Independent Authorities

=== District 40 ===
Each of the 40 districts in the New Jersey Legislature has one representative in the New Jersey Senate and two members in the New Jersey General Assembly. The representatives from the 40th District for the 2024—2025 Legislative Session are:

- Senator Kristin Corrado (R)
- Assemblyman Al Barlas (R)
- Assemblyman Christopher DePhillips (R)

=== Electoral history ===
==== 2023 ====
Led by Kristin Corrado running for re-election in the New Jersey Senate, DePhillips and his Republican running mate, newcomer Al Barlas, defeated Democrats Giovanna Irizarry and Jennifer Marrinan in the 2023 New Jersey General Assembly election.

40th Legislative District General Election, 2023
Party	Candidate	Votes	%
Republican	Christopher P. DePhillips (incumbent)	28,601	27.9
Republican	Al Barlas	27,638	27.0
Democratic	Jennifer Marrinan	23,202	22.7
Democratic	Giovanna Irizarry	22,952	22.4
Total votes		102,393	100.0
Republican hold			
Republican hold			

==== 2021 ====
In the 2021 New Jersey General Assembly election, DePhillips (with 45,246 votes) and running-mate Kevin Rooney defeated their Democratic opponents, a team of Waldwick councilwoman Nicole McNamara (who earned 31,066 votes) and former assistant Bergen County prosecutor Genny Allard (who earned 30,606), to win re-election to his third two-year term in the General Assembly. In Bergen County, DePhillips won with 28.09% of the 60,790 votes cast (versus Allard's 21.73% and McNamara's 21.71%), in Passaic County with 30.48% of the 66,366 votes cast (versus 18.94% and 19.50%), in Essex County with 29.14% of the 10,059 votes cast (versus 20.28% and 20.71%); and in Morris County with 31.83% of the 15,730 votes cast (versus 17.69% and 18.07%).

Leading up to the election, the New Jersey State FMBA (a union representing career firefighters, EMTs, and dispatchers) backed DePhillips in a slate of mixed Republican and Democrat endorsements. The New Jersey Fraternal Order of Police, also in a politically heterogenous round of endorsements, chose to support DePhillips as well.

2021 General Election in 40th District
Party	Candidate	Votes	%	±%
Republican	Kevin J. Rooney (incumbent)	46,004	30.1%	▲1.7
Republican	Christopher DePhillips (incumbent)	45,246	29.6%	▲2.0
Democratic	Genevieve Allard	30,606	20.0%	▼1.8
Democratic	Nicole McNamara	31,066	20.3%	▼1.8
Total votes		'152,922'	'100.0'	

==== 2019 ====
In the November 2019 election, DePhillips (with 21,955 votes) was re-elected to his second two-year term as an assemblyman, defeating the Democratic slate of former Bergen County Freeholder Julie O'Brien (who earned 17,557 votes) and Little Falls councilwoman Maria Martini Cordonnier (who earned 17,332). In Bergen County, DePhillips won with 27.84% of the 17,046 cast (versus O'Brien's 22.17% and Cordonnier's 21.63%); In Passaic County with 26.97% of the 36,050 votes cast (versus 22.58% and 22.45%), in Essex County with 26.71% of the 3,254 votes cast (versus 22.74% and 23.11%); and in Morris County with 30.26% of the 7,666 votes cast (versus 19.25% and 19.05%).

In late October 2019, DePhillips and his running mate, Kevin Rooney, skipped a debate hosted by the League of Women Voters, claiming that the question-selection process was "broken" and "unfair" because an earlier debate sponsored by the Wayne League of Women Voters had allowed, "...a local Democratic candidate to be part of a group that was screening questions and determining what questions would be asked".

2019 General Election in 40th District
Party	Candidate	Votes	%	±%
Republican	Kevin J. Rooney (incumbent)	22,562	28.4%	▲1.7
Republican	Christopher DePhillips (incumbent)	21,955	27.6%	▲1.3
Democratic	Julie O'Brien	17,557	22.1%	▼1.1
Democratic	Maria Martini Cordonnier	17,332	21.8	▼0.8
Total votes		'79,426'	'100.0'	

==== 2017 ====
In the 2013 general election, the last time all three legislative seats in the 40th District were up for vote simultaneously, the winners were Republicans Kevin J. O'Toole in the Senate and Scott Rumana and David C. Russo in the Assembly. By the 2017 primaries all would be gone, with O'Toole resigning in 2017 to become a Commissioner of the Port Authority of New York and New Jersey (being replaced by Kristin Corrado), Rumana leaving in 2016 to become a judge in New Jersey Superior Court (replaced By Kevin J. Rooney) and Russo's announcement that he would not run for another term of office, leaving a vacuum that led to a series of primary challenges. DePhillips joined the June 2017 primary, seeking to replace Russo and running on a ticket with Rooney; they defeated primary opponents Joseph Bubba Jr. and the comeback attempt of former State Senator Norman M. Robertson by margins of 2–1; Kristin Corrado won the Senate nomination against former Assemblyman Paul DiGaetano.

Since 1973, the 40th District has always leaned Republican, never electing a Democrat through the 2017 general election. However, a poll conducted by Democrats shortly before the election showed the two slates tied at 39%, with 21% of voters undecided. In the November 2017 general election, DePhillips (with 30,610 votes; 26.3% of all ballots cast) and his running mate, incumbent Kevin J. Rooney (with 31,170; 26.8%), defeated Democratic challengers Christine Ordway (27,092; 23.3%) and Paul Vagianos (26,737; 23.0%) to win both Assembly seats from the district for the Republicans.

2017 General Election in 40th District
Party	Candidate	Votes	%	±%
Republican	Kevin J. Rooney (incumbent)	31,170	26.8	▼0.8
Republican	Christopher DePhillips	30,610	26.3	▼1.7
Democratic	Christine Ordway	27,092	23.3	▲1.0
Democratic	Paul Vagianos	26,737	23.0	▲0.8
You Tell Me	Anthony J. Pellechia	748	0.6	N/A
Total votes		'116,357'	'100.0'	

New Jersey General Assembly
Preceded by David C. Russo	Member of the New Jersey General Assembly for the 40th District; January 9, 2018–present With: Kevin J. Rooney	Succeeded by Incumbent
