= Henry McNamara =

American politician (1934–2018)

Member of the New Jersey Senate from the 40th district
- In office November 18, 1985 – January 8, 2008
- Preceded by: Garrett W. Hagedorn
- Succeeded by: Kevin J. O'Toole

Personal details
- Born: December 9, 1934 Passaic, New Jersey, U.S.
- Died: August 27, 2018 (aged 83) Wyckoff, New Jersey, U.S.
- Party: Republican

Henry P. McNamara (December 9, 1934 – August 27, 2018) was an American Republican Party politician, who served in the New Jersey State Senate from 1985 to 2008, where he represented the 40th Legislative District. In the Senate, he was Minority Whip from 1990 to 1991. He was also a member of the Senate Environment Committee and the Transportation Committee.

== Biography ==
He was born in Passaic, New Jersey on December 9, 1934, and attended Pope Pius XII High School. He received a B.A. in 1956 from Seton Hall University in classical languages. Before entering the Senate, McNamara spent six years in the New Jersey National Guard. Senator McNamara also spent a year as Mayor of Wyckoff in 1979, and served as Deputy Mayor in 1980, and was a member of the Bergen County Board of Chosen Freeholders from 1984 to 1986. In 2002, McNamara ran for County Executive of Bergen County, losing to Dennis McNerney in the general election.

McNamara decided against running for re-election in 2007 and announced he would step down at the end of his term in 2008.

McNamara sponsored New Jersey's open space trust fund, wrote the law to clean up underground storage tanks, re-wrote the laws governing toxic waste cleanup and led the way for a Brownfields law – a plan to get private investors to clean up polluted industrial sites and make those sites clean and useful again.

He died on August 27, 2018, in Wyckoff, New Jersey at age 83.

== District 40 ==
Each of the forty districts in the New Jersey Legislature has one representative in the New Jersey Senate and two members in the New Jersey General Assembly. At the end of McNamara's term, the other representatives from the 40th Legislative District were:

- Assemblyman David C. Russo, and
- Assemblyman Kevin J. O'Toole
