= Kevin J. Rooney =

Member of the New Jersey General Assembly

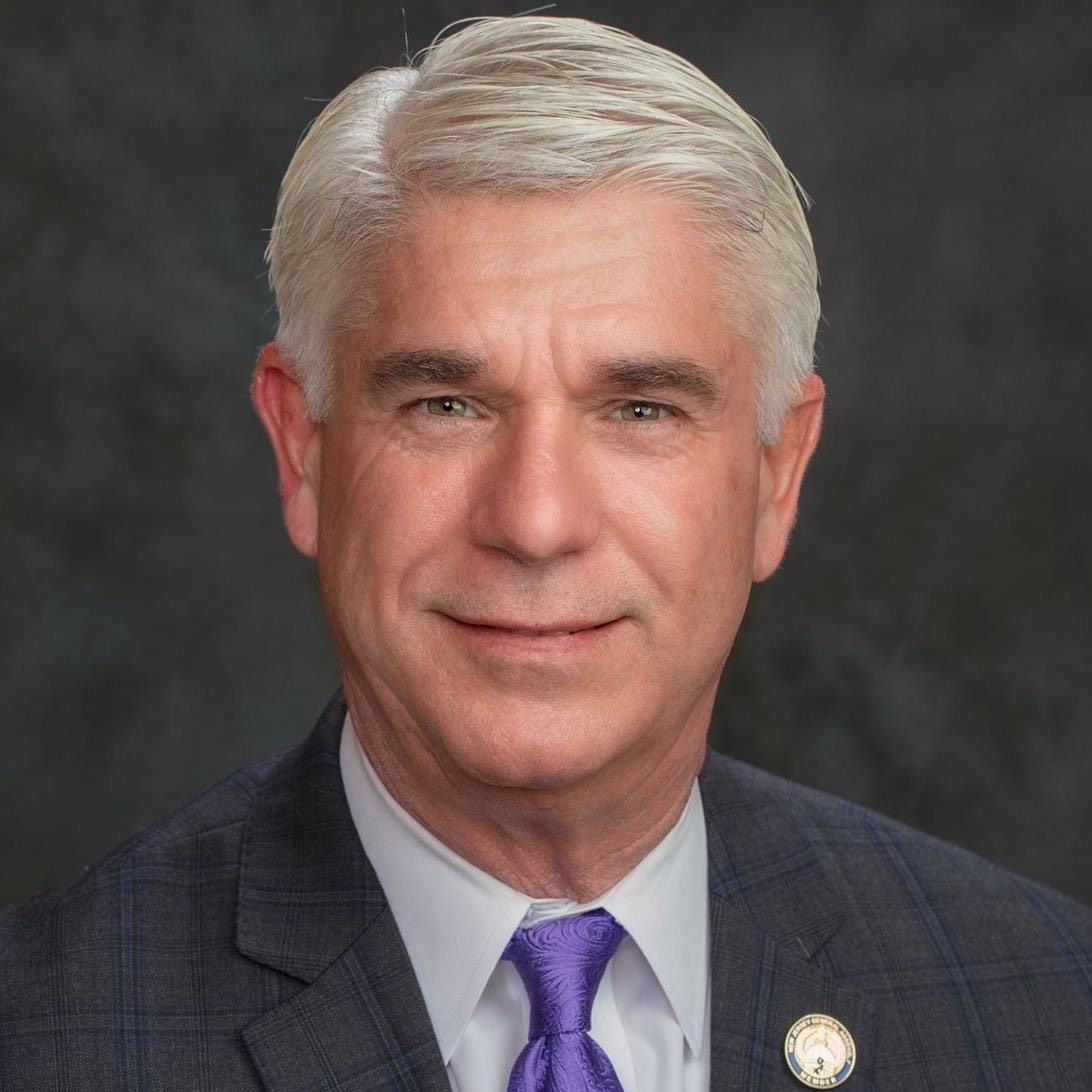

Member of the New Jersey General Assembly from the 40th District
- In office December 12, 2016 – January 9, 2024
- Preceded by: Scott T. Rumana
- Succeeded by: Al Barlas

Member of the Wyckoff Township Committee
- In office January 1, 2010 – December 12, 2016
- Preceded by: Joseph B. Fiorenzo
- Succeeded by: Timothy Shanley

Personal details
- Born: January 13, 1960 (age 66) Paterson, New Jersey
- Party: Republican
- Spouse: Hayley Shotmeyer Rooney
- Children: 4
- Education: Ramapo College; Rutgers University
- Website: Legislative Webpage

Kevin J. Rooney (born January 13, 1960) is an American Republican Party politician who represented the 40th Legislative District in the New Jersey General Assembly from 2016 to 2024. Rooney served in the General Assembly as Deputy Republican Whip from 2021 to 2022 and served as the Deputy Minority Conference Leader from 2022 to 2024. Before serving in the Assembly, Rooney served as a Committeeman in Wyckoff.

== Early and personal life ==
Rooney was born in Paterson, New Jersey. He is a lifelong Bergen County resident and grew up in Upper Saddle River. He graduated in 1977 from Northern Highlands Regional High School in Allendale, graduated in 1980 from Ramapo College in 1980 with a major in business and attended Cook College of Rutgers University for arboriculture.

Rooney won the 2013 version of the Food Network series Chopped, donating his $10,000 winnings to Oasis – A Haven for Women and Children based in Paterson.

Rooney is the Managing Partner of HMS Global Holdings, LLC. He resides in Wyckoff with his wife Hayley Shotmeyer Rooney. They have four children and four grandchildren.

== Early political career ==
Rooney served on the Wyckoff Zoning Board from 1999 to 2009. He was first elected to the Wyckoff Township Committee in 2009 and was as a member until 2016. He served as deputy mayor in 2010 and 2014, and was selected as the township's mayor in 2011, 2015 and 2016.

== New Jersey General Assembly ==
In December 2016, Rooney became an Assemblyman representing the 40th Legislative District of New Jersey when he was selected to complete Scott Rumana's term in the Assembly when Rumana resigned his seat after he was appointed to serve as a judge in New Jersey Superior Court.

In the wake of the 2021 apportionment, with several municipalities in Essex County added to the 40th district, Al Barlas gained support from Republican leaders for the second seat that had been held by Rooney, and was paired with DePhillips in the 2023 New Jersey General Assembly election.

== Electoral history ==
=== 2019 ===
In 2019, Democrats Maria Martini Cordonnier and Micheal Sedon won the primary to challenge Rooney and his running mate Christopher DePhillips. However, Sedon dropped out of the general election and was replaced with former Bergen County Freeholder Julie O'Brien. During the election, Rooney and DePhillips skipped a debate hosted by the League of Women Voters, claiming it was unfair. The Democrats lost to the incumbents.

2019 General Election in 40th District
Party	Candidate	Votes	%	±%
Republican	Kevin J. Rooney (Incumbent)	22,562	28.4%	▲1.7
Republican	Christopher P. DePhillips (Incumbent)	21,955	27.6%	▲1.3
Democratic	Julie O'Brien	17,557	22.1%	▼1.1
Democratic	Maria Martini Cordonnier	17,332	21.8	▼0.8
Total votes		'79,426'	'100.0'	

=== 2017 ===
In the 2017 election incumbent David C. Russo retired, so Republican Christopher DePhillips ran for the open seat as a team with Rooney. Democrats Christine Ordway and Paul Vagianos and independent Anthony J. Pellechia also vied for the two Assembly seats. Rooney and DePhillips won the general election.

2017 General Election in 40th District
Party	Candidate	Votes	%	±%
Republican	Kevin J. Rooney (Incumbent)	31,170	26.8	▼0.8
Republican	Christopher P. DePhillips	30,610	26.3	▼1.7
Democratic	Christine Ordway	27,092	23.3	▲1.0
Democratic	Paul Vagianos	26,737	23.0	▲0.8
You Tell Me	Anthony J. Pellechia	748	0.6	N/A
Total votes		'116,357'	'100.0'	
