= Kristin Corrado =

Member of the New Jersey Senate (born 1965)

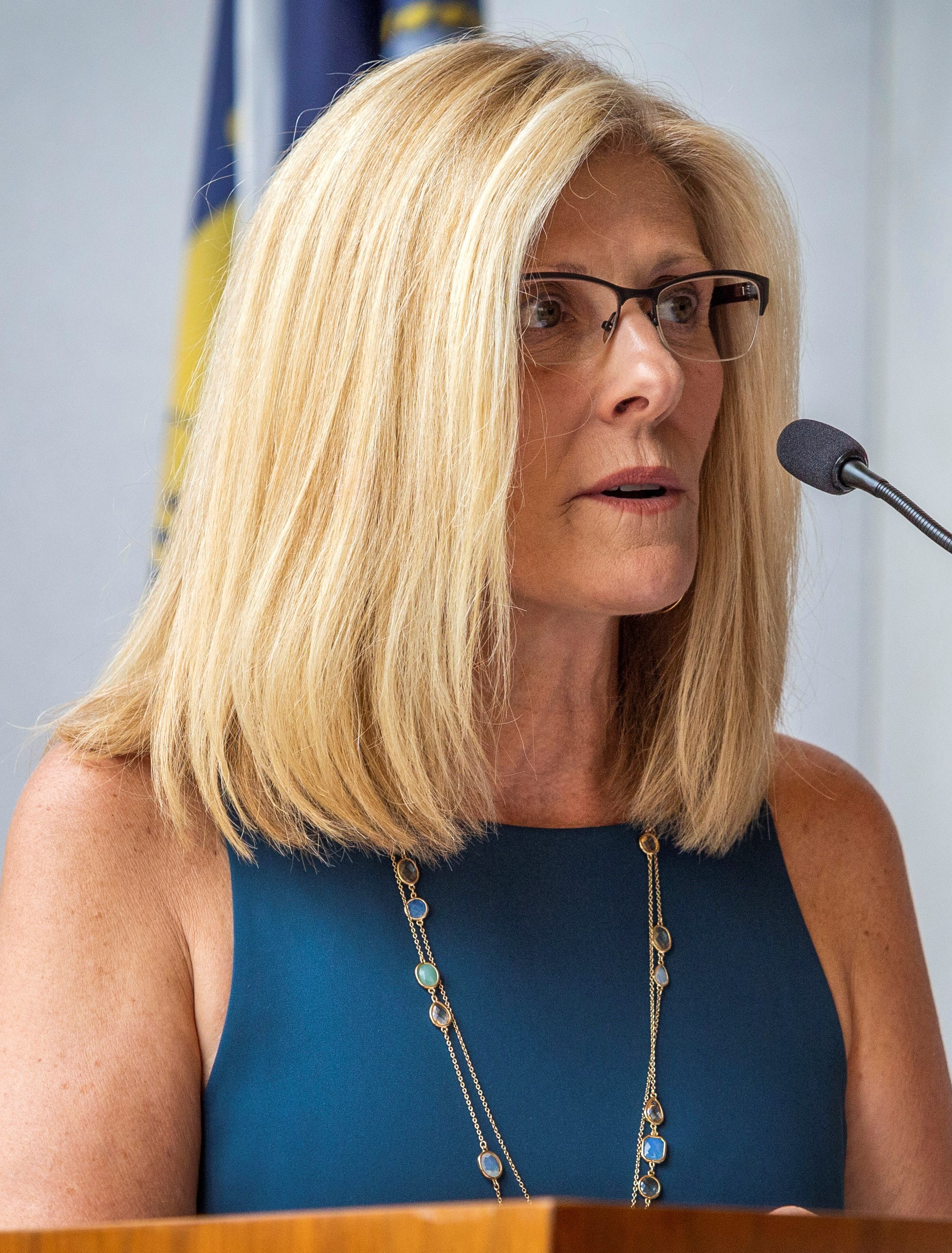

Member of the New Jersey Senate from the 40th district
- Incumbent
- Assumed office October 5, 2017
- Preceded by: Kevin J. O'Toole

County Clerk of Passaic County
- In office January 1, 2010 – October 5, 2017
- Preceded by: Karen Brown
- Succeeded by: Walter Davison

Personal details
- Born: June 24, 1965 (age 61) Totowa, New Jersey, U.S.
- Party: Republican
- Spouse: Stan Alcala
- Education: East Stroudsburg University (BA); Seton Hall University (JD)
- Website: State Senate website

Kristin M. Corrado (born June 24, 1965) is an American Republican Party politician who has represented the 40th Legislative District in the New Jersey Senate since she was sworn into office on October 5, 2017. Before her appointment to the senate, she served as Passaic County Clerk for seven years.

== Personal and early life ==
A resident of Totowa, New Jersey, for her entire life, Corrado attended St. James School before moving on to Paul VI High School. Corrado attended East Stroudsburg University of Pennsylvania and is a graduate of Seton Hall University School of Law. First elected as Passaic County Clerk in 2009, Corrado was re-elected for a second five-year term in 2014.

== New Jersey Senate ==
Corrado was appointed fill the seat left by former Senator Kevin J. O'Toole, who had resigned from office on July 1, 2017, to become a commissioner of the Port Authority of New York and New Jersey.

In early 2018, Corrado led a fight to block Governor Phil Murphy's nomination of Assemblywoman Elizabeth Maher Muoio to be Secretary of Treasury, questioning Muoio's lack of experience in issues related to her proposed position.

Corrado sponsored a bill alongside Senators Paul Sarlo, Gerald Cardinale, Loretta Weinberg, and Joseph Lagana that would push a special election to the following year if a vacancy for the County Sheriff, Clerk, or Surrogate posts if the vacancy occurs 70 days before election day.

=== Committees ===
Committee assignments for the 2024—2025 Legislative Session are:

- Education
- Economic Growth
- Judiciary

=== District 40 ===
Each of the 40 districts in the New Jersey Legislature has one representative in the New Jersey Senate and two members in the New Jersey General Assembly. The representatives from the 40th District for the 2024—2025 Legislative Session are:

- Senator Kristin Corrado (R)
- Assemblyman Al Barlas (R)
- Assemblyman Christopher DePhillips (R)

== Electoral history ==
=== New Jersey Senate ===
40th Legislative District General Election, 2023
Party	Candidate	Votes	%
Republican	Kristin M. Corrado (incumbent)	29,349	56.3
Democratic	Jennifer Ehrentraut	22,821	43.7
Total votes		52,170	100.0
Republican hold			

40th Legislative District general election, 2021
Party	Candidate	Votes	%
Republican	Kristin M. Corrado (incumbent)	47,230	60.97
Democratic	Michael A. Sedon	30,237	39.03
Total votes		77,467	100.0
Republican hold			

2017 General Election in the 40th District
Party	Candidate	Votes	%	±%
Republican	Kristin M. Corrado (Incumbent)	33,495	56.2	▼9.7
Democratic	Thomas Duch	26,060	43.8	▲9.7
Total votes		'59,555'	'100.0'	

=== 2014 ===
Corrado ran for re-election as county clerk in 2014. She beat Democratic nominee Jeffery Gardner by 944 votes (a 1.2% margin).

2014 Passaic County Clerk General Election
Party	Candidate	Votes	%	±%
Republican	Kristin M. Corrado (Incumbent)	42,026	50.5%	▼1.2
Democratic	Jeffrey Gardner	41,082	49.3%	▲1.1
Total votes		'83,108'	'100.0'	

=== 2009 ===
In 2009, incumbent Clerk Karen Brown retired instead of running for a second term. The Democratic nominee was Keith Kazmark, who lost to Corrado by 3,318 votes (a margin of 3.5%).

2009 Passaic County Clerk General Election
Party	Candidate	Votes	%	±%
Republican	Kristin M. Corrado	49,399	51.7%	▲5.3
Democratic	Keith Kazmark	46,081	48.2%	▼5.9
Total votes		'95,480'	'100.0'	
