= Al Barlas =

American politician from New Jersey

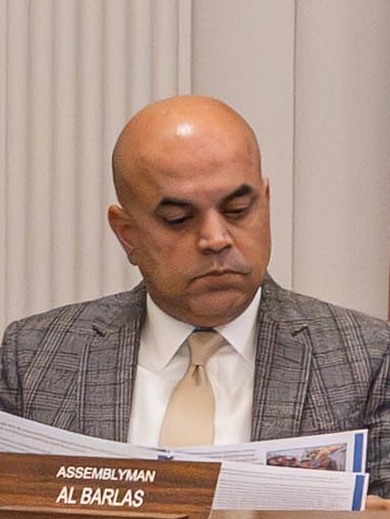
- Barlas in 2026

Member of the New Jersey General Assembly from the 40th district
- Incumbent
- Assumed office January 9, 2024 Serving with Christopher DePhillips
- Preceded by: Kevin J. Rooney

Personal details
- Born: June 21, 1981 (age 44) Pakistan
- Party: Republican
- Website: Legislative webpage

Al Barlas (born June 21, 1981) is an American politician serving as a member of the New Jersey General Assembly for the 40th legislative district since 2024. He previously served as chair of the Essex County Republican Party.

== Biography ==
A resident of Cedar Grove, New Jersey, Barlas is employed as co-administrator and director of marketing for the New Jersey Intergovernmental Insurance Fund and has been the chairman of the Essex County Republican Committee since 2011. He served as the Republican chair of the New Jersey Apportionment Commission.

A Muslim American who was born in Pakistan, Barlas announced in June 2016 that he still supported Donald Trump's candidacy in the 2016 United States presidential election, despite Trump's criticism of Islam and Muslims after the Orlando nightclub shooting that took place in the preceding days.

== New Jersey General Assembly ==
In the wake of the 2021 apportionment, with several municipalities in Essex County added to the district, Barlas gained support from Republican leaders for the second Assembly seat that had been held by Kevin J. Rooney. Barlas and incumbent Christopher DePhillips defeated Democrats Giovanna Irizarry and Jennifer Marrinan in the 2023 New Jersey General Assembly election. Barlas was one of 27 members elected for the first time in 2023 to serve in the General Assembly, more than one-third of the seats.

== Committees ==
Committee assignments for the 2024—2025 Legislative Session are:

- Budget
- Community Development and Women's Affairs
- Labor

=== District 40 ===
Each of the 40 districts in the New Jersey Legislature has one representative in the New Jersey Senate and two members in the New Jersey General Assembly. The representatives from the 40th District for the 2024—2025 Legislative Session are:

- Senator Kristin Corrado (R)
- Assemblyman Al Barlas (R)
- Assemblyman Christopher DePhillips (R)

== Electoral history ==
40th Legislative District General Election, 2023
Party	Candidate	Votes	%
Republican	Christopher P. DePhillips (incumbent)	28,601	27.9
Republican	Al Barlas	27,638	27.0
Democratic	Jennifer Marrinan	23,202	22.7
Democratic	Giovanna Irizarry	22,952	22.4
Total votes		102,393	100.0
Republican hold			
Republican hold			
