= 2013 New Jersey Senate election =

2013 New Jersey State Senate election
- November 5, 2013

All 40 seats in the New Jersey Senate 21 seats needed for a majority
- Turnout: 40% (▲13pp)
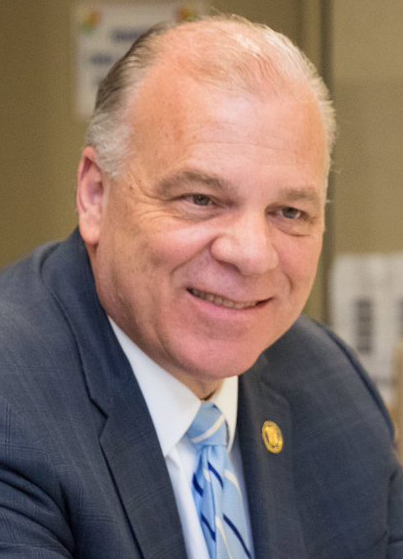

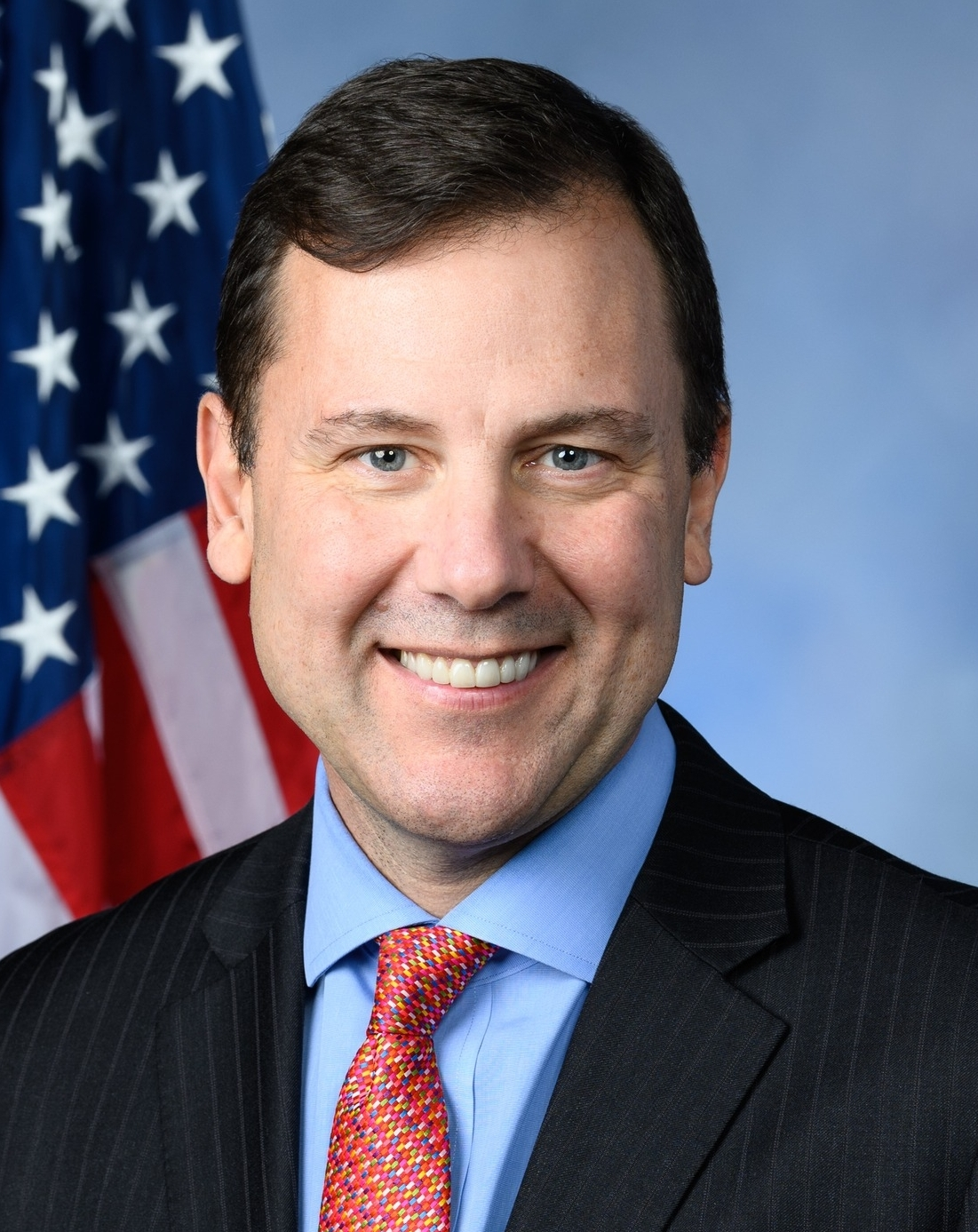
	Majority party	Minority party
Leader	Steve Sweeney	Thomas Kean Jr.
Party	Democratic	Republican
Leader since	January 12, 2010	January 8, 2008
Leader's seat	District 3 (West Deptford)	District 21 (Westfield)
Last election	24	16
Seats won	24	16
Seat change	Steady	Steady
Popular vote	899,672	988,214
Percentage	47.4%	52.1%
Swing	▼3.7%	▲3.4%
- Results by district Democratic hold Republican hold
Senate President before election
Stephen M. Sweeney
Democratic
Elected Senate President
Stephen M. Sweeney
Democratic

The 2013 New Jersey Senate election coincided with Chris Christie's landslide re-election to a second term as Governor of New Jersey.

2013 was an election of remarkable stability in the Senate, as just one seat (that of gubernatorial nominee Buono) failed to return its incumbent to office. As a corollary, no seats changed party for the second consecutive election. This was the last time that the party that won the popular vote did not win the most seats.

Contents
Incumbents not running • Summary of results
By District: 1 • 2 • 3 • 4 • 5 • 6 • 7 • 8 • 9 • 10 • 11 • 12 • 13 • 14 • 15 • 16 • 17 • 18 • 19 • 20 • 21 • 22 • 23 • 24 • 25 • 26 • 27 • 28 • 29 • 30 • 31 • 32 • 33 • 34 • 35 • 36 • 37 • 38 • 39 • 40

== Results ==
↓
24	16
Democratic	Republican

Parties	Seats				Popular Vote		
Parties	2011	2013	+/-	Strength	Vote	%	Change
Democratic	24	24	Steady	60%	899,672	47.4%	0.0%
Republican	16	16	Steady	40%	988,214	52.1%	0.0%
Libertarian	0	0	Steady	0%	1,014	0.1%	0.0%
Independent	0	0	Steady	0%	8,924	0.5%	0.0%
Total	40	40	0	100.0%	1,898,155	100.0%	-

== Incumbents not running for re-election ==
=== Democratic ===
- Barbara Buono (District 18) (ran for Governor)

== Summary of results by State Senate district ==
District	2012 Pres.	Incumbent	Party	Elected Senator	Party
1st Legislative District	D+6.16	Jeff Van Drew	Dem	Jeff Van Drew	Dem
2nd Legislative District	D+20.84	Jim Whelan	Dem	Jim Whelan	Dem
3rd Legislative District	D+11.24	Steve Sweeney	Dem	Steve Sweeney	Dem
4th Legislative District	D+23.24	Fred Madden	Dem	Fred Madden	Dem
5th Legislative District	D+39.94	Donald Norcross	Dem	Donald Norcross	Dem
6th Legislative District	D+29.54	James Beach	Dem	James Beach	Dem
7th Legislative District	D+28.38	Diane Allen	Rep	Diane Allen	Rep
8th Legislative District	D+7.31	Dawn Addiego	Rep	Dawn Addiego	Rep
9th Legislative District	R+11.05	Christopher Connors	Rep	Christopher Connors	Rep
10th Legislative District	R+14.06	Jim Holzapfel	Rep	Jim Holzapfel	Rep
11th Legislative District	D+11.04	Jennifer Beck	Rep	Jennifer Beck	Rep
12th Legislative District	R+6.14	Samuel D. Thompson	Rep	Samuel D. Thompson	Rep
13th Legislative District	R+10.33	Joe Kyrillos	Rep	Joe Kyrillos	Rep
14th Legislative District	D+16.12	Linda Greenstein	Dem	Linda Greenstein	Dem
15th Legislative District	D+46.7	Shirley Turner	Dem	Shirley Turner	Dem
16th Legislative District	D+7.65	Kip Bateman	Rep	Kip Bateman	Rep
17th Legislative District	D+45.69	Bob Smith	Dem	Bob Smith	Dem
18th Legislative District	D+22.64	Barbara Buono	Dem	Peter J. Barnes III	Dem
19th Legislative District	D+34.78	Joe Vitale	Dem	Joe Vitale	Dem
20th Legislative District	D+60.96	Raymond Lesniak	Dem	Raymond Lesniak	Dem
21st Legislative District	R+5.80	Tom Kean Jr.	Rep	Tom Kean Jr.	Rep
22nd Legislative District	D+36.46	Nicholas Scutari	Dem	Nicholas Scutari	Dem
23rd Legislative District	R+11.68	Michael Doherty	Rep	Michael Doherty	Rep
24th Legislative District	R+20.64	Steve Oroho	Rep	Steve Oroho	Rep
25th Legislative District	R+8.32	Anthony Bucco	Rep	Anthony Bucco	Rep
26th Legislative District	R+10.79	Joe Pennacchio	Rep	Joe Pennacchio	Rep
27th Legislative District	D+14.73	Richard Codey	Dem	Richard Codey	Dem
28th Legislative District	D+66.45	Ronald Rice	Dem	Ronald Rice	Dem
29th Legislative District	D+66.45	Teresa Ruiz	Dem	Teresa Ruiz	Dem
30th Legislative District	R+26.01	Robert W. Singer	Rep	Robert W. Singer	Rep
31st Legislative District	D+62.87	Sandra Bolden Cunningham	Dem	Sandra Bolden Cunningham	Dem
32nd Legislative District	D+48.62	Nicholas Sacco	Dem	Nicholas Sacco	Dem
33rd Legislative District	D+54.92	Brian Stack	Dem	Brian Stack	Dem
34th Legislative District	D+64.83	Nia Gill	Dem	Nia Gill	Dem
35th Legislative District	D+64.89	Nellie Pou	Dem	Nellie Pou	Dem
36th Legislative District	D+27.35	Paul Sarlo	Dem	Paul Sarlo	Dem
37th Legislative District	D+37.01	Loretta Weinberg	Dem	Loretta Weinberg	Dem
38th Legislative District	D+10.05	Robert M. Gordon	Dem	Robert M. Gordon	Dem
39th Legislative District	R+9.39	Gerald Cardinale	Rep	Gerald Cardinale	Rep
40th Legislative District	R+11.68	Kevin O'Toole	Rep	Kevin O'Toole	Rep

=== Close races ===
Seats where the margin of victory was under 10%:

1. District 14, 2.4%
2. District 18, 3.8%
3. District 38, 3.8%
4. District 3, 9.6%
5. District 2, 10.0%

== District 1 ==
=== Democratic primary ===
2013 Democratic primary
Party	Candidate	Votes	%
Democratic	Jeff Van Drew (incumbent)	3,880	100.00%
Total votes		3,880	100.00%

=== Republican primary ===
2013 Republican primary
Party	Candidate	Votes	%
Republican	Susan Adelizzi Schmidt	6,437	83.96%
Republican	Robert G. Campbell	1,230	16.04%
Total votes		7,667	100.00%

=== General election ===
Debate

2013 New Jersey's 2nd Senate district debate
No.	Date	Host	Moderator	Link	Democratic	Republican
Key: P Participant A Absent N Not invited I Invited W Withdrawn						
Key: P Participant A Absent N Not invited I Invited W Withdrawn					Jeff Van Drew	Susan Adelizzi Schmidt
1	Oct. 21, 2013	The Press of Atlantic City; William J. Hughes Center for Public Policy at Stockton University	Reva Curry		P	P

2013 general election
Party	Candidate	Votes	%	±%
Democratic	Jeff Van Drew (incumbent)	34,624	59.4	▲5.3
Republican	Susan Adelizzi Schmidt	22,835	39.2	▼6.7
Independence For All	Tom Greto	825	1.4	N/A
Total votes		58,284	100.00%	

== District 2 ==
=== Democratic primary ===
2013 Democratic primary
Party	Candidate	Votes	%
Democratic	Jim Whelan (incumbent)	6,687	100.00%
Total votes		6,687	100.00%

=== Republican primary ===
2013 Republican primary
Party	Candidate	Votes	%
Republican	Frank X. Balles	6,835	84.11%
Republican	Marybeth Bennett	1,291	15.89%
Total votes		8,126	100.00%

=== General election ===
2013 general election
Party	Candidate	Votes	%	±%
Democratic	Jim Whelan (incumbent)	29,337	55.0	▲1.6
Republican	Frank X. Balles	24,008	45.0	▼1.6
Total votes		53,345	100.00%	

== District 3 ==
=== Democratic primary ===
2013 Democratic primary
Party	Candidate	Votes	%
Democratic	Stephen M. Sweeney (incumbent)	4,658	100.00%
Total votes		4,658	100.00%

=== Republican primary ===
2013 Republican primary
Party	Candidate	Votes	%
Republican	Niki A. Trunk	4,164	100.00%
Total votes		4,164	100.00%

=== General election ===
2013 general election
Party	Candidate	Votes	%	±%
Democratic	Stephen M. Sweeney (incumbent)	31,045	54.8	▼0.8
Republican	Niki A. Trunk	25,599	45.2	▲0.8
Total votes		56,644	100.00%	

== District 4 ==
=== Democratic primary ===
2013 Democratic primary
Party	Candidate	Votes	%
Democratic	Fred H. Madden (incumbent)	4,976	100.00%
Total votes		4,976	100.00%

=== Republican primary ===
2013 Republican primary
Party	Candidate	Votes	%
Republican	Giancarlo D'Orazio	3,681	100.00%
Total votes		3,681	100.00%

=== General election ===
2013 general election
Party	Candidate	Votes	%	±%
Democratic	Fred H. Madden (incumbent)	29,439	57.9	▼4.2
Republican	Giancarlo D'Orazio	21,376	42.1	▲4.2
Total votes		50,815	100.00%	

== District 5 ==
=== Democratic primary ===
2013 Democratic primary
Party	Candidate	Votes	%
Democratic	Donald Norcross (incumbent)	4,805	100.00%
Total votes		4,805	100.00%

=== Republican primary ===
2013 Republican primary
Party	Candidate	Votes	%
Republican	Keith Walker	2,569	100.00%
Total votes		2,569	100.00%

=== General election ===
2013 general election
Party	Candidate	Votes	%	±%
Democratic	Donald Norcross (incumbent)	25,383	57.9	▲1.1
Republican	Keith Walker	18,448	42.1	▼1.1
Total votes		43,831	100.00%	

== District 6 ==
=== Democratic primary ===
2013 Democratic primary
Party	Candidate	Votes	%
Democratic	James Beach (incumbent)	5,126	100.00%
Total votes		5,126	100.00%

=== Republican primary ===
2013 Republican primary
Party	Candidate	Votes	%
Republican	Sudhir Deshmukh	2,736	71.53%
Republican	Robert Shapiro	1,089	28.47%
Total votes		3,825	100.00%

=== General election ===
2013 general election
Party	Candidate	Votes	%	±%
Democratic	James Beach (incumbent)	34,847	63.4	▲1.3
Republican	Sudhir Deshmukh	20,080	36.6	▼1.3
Total votes		54,927	100.00%	

== District 7 ==
=== Republican primary ===
2013 Republican primary
Party	Candidate	Votes	%
Republican	Diane Allen (incumbent)	6,127	100.00%
Total votes		6,127	100.00%

=== Democratic primary ===
2013 Democratic primary
Party	Candidate	Votes	%
Democratic	Gary Catrambone	6,137	100.00%
Total votes		6,137	100.00%

=== General election ===
2013 general election
Party	Candidate	Votes	%	±%
Republican	Diane Allen (incumbent)	38,350	60.4%	▲3.4
Democratic	Gary Catrambone	25,106	39.6%	▼3.4
Total votes		63,456	100.00%	

== District 8 ==
=== Republican primary ===
2013 Republican primary
Party	Candidate	Votes	%
Republican	Dawn Marie Addiego (incumbent)	7,788	100.00%
Total votes		7,788	100.00%

=== Democratic primary ===
2013 Democratic primary
Party	Candidate	Votes	%
Democratic	Javier Vazquez	3,382	100.00%
Total votes		3,382	100.00%

=== General election ===
2013 general election
Party	Candidate	Votes	%	±%
Republican	Dawn Marie Addiego (incumbent)	35,894	63.5%	▼36.5
Democratic	Javier Vasquez	20,633	36.5%	N/A
Total votes		56,527	100.00%	

== District 9 ==
=== Republican primary ===
2013 Republican primary
Party	Candidate	Votes	%
Republican	Christopher J. Connors (incumbent)	10,220	100.00%
Total votes		10,220	100.00%

=== Democratic primary ===
2013 Democratic primary
Party	Candidate	Votes	%
Democratic	Anthony Mazzella	2,945	100.00%
Total votes		2,945	100.00%

=== General election ===
2013 general election
Party	Candidate	Votes	%	±%
Republican	Christopher J. Connors (incumbent)	46,949	70.8%	▲5.9
Democratic	Anthony Mazzella	19,365	29.2%	▼5.9
Total votes		66,314	100.00%	

== District 10 ==
=== Republican primary ===
2013 Republican primary
Party	Candidate	Votes	%
Republican	James W. Holzapfel (incumbent)	10,331	100.00%
Total votes		10,331	100.00%

=== Democratic primary ===
2013 Democratic primary
Party	Candidate	Votes	%
Democratic	John Bendel	2,925	100.00%
Total votes		2,925	100.00%

=== General election ===
2013 general election
Party	Candidate	Votes	%	±%
Republican	Jim Holzapfel (incumbent)	45,565	69.7%	▲5.7
Democratic	John Bendel	19,807	30.3%	▼5.7
Total votes		65,372	100.00%	

== District 11 ==
=== Republican primary ===
2013 Republican primary
Party	Candidate	Votes	%
Republican	Jennifer Beck (incumbent)	4,827	100.00%
Total votes		4,827	100.00%

=== Democratic primary ===
2013 Democratic primary
Party	Candidate	Votes	%
Democratic	Michael Brantley	2,980	100.00%
Total votes		2,980	100.00%

=== General election ===
2013 general election
Party	Candidate	Votes	%	±%
Republican	Jennifer Beck (incumbent)	30,531	60.0	▲3.4
Democratic	Michael Brantley	19,735	38.8	▼4.6
For the People	Marie E. Amato-Juckiewicz	599	1.2	N/A
Total votes		50,865	100.00%	

== District 12 ==
=== Republican primary ===
2013 Republican primary
Party	Candidate	Votes	%
Republican	Samuel D. Thompson (incumbent)	4,593	100.00%
Total votes		4,593	100.00%

=== Democratic primary ===
2013 Democratic primary
Party	Candidate	Votes	%
Democratic	Raymond D. Dothard	1,959	100.00%
Total votes		1,959	100.00%

=== General election ===
2013 general election
Party	Candidate	Votes	%	±%
Republican	Samuel D. Thompson (incumbent)	32,911	65.4	▲5.5
Democratic	Raymond D. Dotard	17,440	34.6	▼5.5
Total votes		50,351	100.00%	

== District 13 ==
=== Republican primary ===
2013 Republican primary
Party	Candidate	Votes	%
Republican	Joe Kyrillos (incumbent)	5,866	78.80%
Republican	Leigh-Ann Bellew	1,578	21.20%
Total votes		7,444	100.00%

=== Democratic primary ===
2013 Democratic primary
Party	Candidate	Votes	%
Democratic	Joseph Marques	1,996	100.00%
Total votes		1,996	100.00%

=== General election ===
2013 general election
Party	Candidate	Votes	%	±%
Republican	Joe Kyrillos (incumbent)	40,762	68.1%	▲8.2
Democratic	Joseph Marques	18,289	30.6%	▼6.1
The People's Choice	Mac Dara F. Lyden	774	1.3%	▲0.7
Total votes		59,825	100.00%	

== District 14 ==
=== Democratic primary ===
2013 Democratic primary
Party	Candidate	Votes	%
Democratic	Linda R. Greenstein (incumbent)	4,202	100.00%
Total votes		4,202	100.00%

=== Republican primary ===
2013 Republican primary
Party	Candidate	Votes	%
Republican	Peter Inverso	4,041	100.00%
Total votes		4,041	100.00%

=== General election ===
2013 general election
Party	Candidate	Votes	%	±%
Democratic	Linda R. Greenstein (incumbent)	31,387	50.4%	▼4.9
Republican	Peter Inverso	29,903	48.0%	▲3.3
Libertarian	Don Dezarn	1,014	1.6%	N/A
Total votes		62,304	100.00%	

== District 15 ==
=== Democratic primary ===
2013 Democratic primary
Party	Candidate	Votes	%
Democratic	Shirley Turner (incumbent)	5,299	100.00%
Total votes		5,299	100.00%

=== Republican primary ===
2013 Republican primary
Party	Candidate	Votes	%
Republican	Don Cox	2,524	100.00%
Total votes		2,524	100.00%

=== General election ===
2013 general election
Party	Candidate	Votes	%	±%
Democratic	Shirley Turner (incumbent)	30,250	63.3%	▼3.1
Republican	Don Cox	17,507	36.7%	▲3.1
Total votes		47,757	100.00%	

== District 16 ==
=== Republican primary ===
2013 Republican primary
Party	Candidate	Votes	%
Republican	Christopher Bateman (incumbent)	6,116	100.00%
Total votes		6,116	100.00%

=== Democratic primary ===
2013 Democratic primary
Party	Candidate	Votes	%
Democratic	Christian R. Mastondrea	2,608	100.00%
Total votes		2,608	100.00%

=== General election ===
2013 general election
Party	Candidate	Votes	%	±%
Republican	Christopher Bateman (incumbent)	34,865	60.3%	▲5.7
Democratic	Christian R. Mastondrea	22,990	39.7%	▼5.7
Total votes		57,855	100.00%	

== District 17 ==
=== Democratic primary ===
2013 Democratic primary
Party	Candidate	Votes	%
Democratic	Bob Smith (incumbent)	3,949	100.00%
Total votes		3,949	100.00%

=== Republican primary ===
2013 Republican primary
Party	Candidate	Votes	%
Republican	Brian D. Levine	1,836	100.00%
Total votes		1,836	100.00%

=== General election ===
2013 general election
Party	Candidate	Votes	%	±%
Democratic	Bob Smith	22,920	59.8%	▼4.2
Republican	Brian D. Levine	15,403	40.2%	▲4.2
Total votes		38,323	100.00%	

== District 18 ==
=== Democratic primary ===
2013 Democratic primary
Party	Candidate	Votes	%
Democratic	Peter J. Barnes III	5,068	100.00%
Total votes		5,068	100.00%

=== Republican primary ===
2013 Republican primary
Party	Candidate	Votes	%
Republican	David Stahl	2,937	100.00%
Total votes		2,937	100.00%

=== General election ===
2013 general election
Party	Candidate	Votes	%	±%
Democratic	Peter J. Barnes III	25,063	51.9%	▼8.2
Republican	David Stahl	23,184	48.1%	▲8.2
Total votes		48,247	100.0	

== District 19 ==
=== Democratic primary ===
2013 Democratic primary
Party	Candidate	Votes	%
Democratic	Joe Vitale (incumbent)	5,659	100.00%
Total votes		5,659	100.00%

=== Republican primary ===
2013 Republican primary
Party	Candidate	Votes	%
Republican	Robert Luban	1,718	100.00%
Total votes		1,718	100.00%

=== General election ===
2013 general election
Party	Candidate	Votes	%	±%
Democratic	Joe Vitale (incumbent)	24,126	62.6%	▼4.3
Republican	Robert Luban	14,439	37.4%	▲4.3
Total votes		38,565	100.00%	

== District 20 ==
=== Democratic primary ===
2013 Democratic primary
Party	Candidate	Votes	%
Democratic	Raymond Lesniak (incumbent)	9,318	65.91%
Democratic	Donna Obe	4,819	34.09%
Total votes		14,137	100.00%

=== General election ===
2013 general election
Party	Candidate	Votes	%	±%
Democratic	Raymond Lesniak (incumbent)	21,251	100.0%	▲24.5
Total votes		21,251	100.00%	

== District 21 ==
=== Republican primary ===
2013 Republican primary
Party	Candidate	Votes	%
Republican	Thomas Kean Jr. (incumbent)	7,521	100.00%
Total votes		7,521	100.00%

=== Democratic primary ===
2013 Democratic primary
Party	Candidate	Votes	%
Democratic	Michael Komondy	2,839	100.00%
Total votes		2,839	100.00%

=== General election ===
2013 general election
Party	Candidate	Votes	%	±%
Republican	Thomas Kean Jr. (incumbent)	42,423	69.6%	▲2.1
Democratic	Michael Komondy	18,517	30.4%	▼2.1
Total votes		60,940	100.00%	

== District 22 ==
=== Democratic primary ===
2013 Democratic primary
Party	Candidate	Votes	%
Democratic	Nicholas Scutari (incumbent)	6,948	81.46%
Democratic	Nancy Ward	1,581	18.54%
Total votes		8,529	100.00%

=== Republican primary ===
2013 Republican primary
Party	Candidate	Votes	%
Republican	Robert Sherr	2,532	100.00%
Total votes		2,532	100.00%

=== General election ===
2013 general election
Party	Candidate	Votes	%	±%
Democratic	Nicholas Scutari (incumbent)	24,899	59.5	▼2.1
Republican	Robert Sherr	16,933	40.5	▲2.1
Total votes		41,832	100.00%	

== District 23 ==
=== Republican primary ===
2013 Republican primary
Party	Candidate	Votes	%
Republican	Michael J. Doherty (incumbent)	10,428	100.00%
Total votes		10,428	100.00%

=== Democratic primary ===
2013 Democratic primary
Party	Candidate	Votes	%
Democratic	Ben Auletta	2,065	100.00%
Total votes		2,065	100.00%

=== General election ===
2013 general election
Party	Candidate	Votes	%	±%
Republican	Michael J. Doherty (incumbent)	37,477	67.6	▲6.3
Democratic	Gerard R. Bowers	17,311	31.2	▼4.5
Seyler. Us	Daniel Z. Seyler	672	1.2	▼1.8
Total votes		55,460	100.00%	

== District 24 ==
=== Republican primary ===
2013 Republican primary
Party	Candidate	Votes	%
Republican	Steve Oroho (incumbent)	13,779	100.00%
Total votes		13,779	100.00%

=== Democratic primary ===
2013 Democratic primary
Party	Candidate	Votes	%
Democratic	Richard D. Tomko	1,945	100.00%
Total votes		1,945	100.00%

=== General election ===
2013 general election
Party	Candidate	Votes	%	±%
Republican	Steve Oroho (incumbent)	38,819	70.4%	▲4.4
Democratic	Richard D. Tomko	16,292	29.6%	▼4.4
Total votes		55,111	100.00%	

== District 25 ==
=== Republican primary ===
2013 Republican primary
Party	Candidate	Votes	%
Republican	Anthony R. Bucco (incumbent)	8,961	100.00%
Total votes		8,961	100.00%

=== General election ===
2013 general election
Party	Candidate	Votes	%	±%
Republican	Anthony R. Bucco (incumbent)	36,517	86.8%	▲25.8
Buck the Parties	Maureen Castriotta	5,577	13.2%	N/A
Total votes		42,094	100.00%	

== District 26 ==
=== Republican primary ===
2013 Republican primary
Party	Candidate	Votes	%
Republican	Joe Pennacchio (incumbent)	10,066	100.00%
Total votes		10,066	100.00%

=== Democratic primary ===
2013 Democratic primary
Party	Candidate	Votes	%
Democratic	Avery Ann Hart	2,247	100.00%
Total votes		2,247	100.00%

=== General election ===
2013 general election
Party	Candidate	Votes	%	±%
Republican	Joe Pennacchio (incumbent)	35,772	65.0	▲0.7
Democratic	Avery Ann Hart	19,250	35.0	▲2.2
Total votes		55,022	100.00%	

== District 27 ==
=== Democratic primary ===
2013 Democratic primary
Party	Candidate	Votes	%
Democratic	Richard Codey (incumbent)	4,699	100.00%
Total votes		4,699	100.00%

=== Republican primary ===
2013 Republican primary
Party	Candidate	Votes	%
Republican	Lee S. Holtzman	5,887	100.00%
Total votes		5,887	100.00%

=== General election ===
2013 general election
Party	Candidate	Votes	%	±%
Democratic	Richard Codey (incumbent)	34,291	59.3%	▼2.5
Republican	Lee S. Holtzman	23,581	40.7%	▲2.5
Total votes		57,872	100.00%	

== District 28 ==
=== Democratic primary ===
2013 Democratic primary
Party	Candidate	Votes	%
Democratic	Ronald Rice (incumbent)	7,157	100.00%
Total votes		7,157	100.00%

=== Republican primary ===
2013 Republican primary
Party	Candidate	Votes	%
Republican	Frank Contella	1,337	100.00%
Total votes		1,337	100.00%

=== General election ===
2013 general election
Party	Candidate	Votes	%	±%
Democratic	Ronald Rice (incumbent)	27,265	75.7%	▼0.9
Republican	Frank Contella	8,744	24.3%	▲0.9
Total votes		36,009	100.00%	

== District 29 ==
=== Democratic primary ===
2013 Democratic primary
Party	Candidate	Votes	%
Democratic	Teresa Ruiz (incumbent)	4,781	100.00%
Total votes		4,781	100.00%

=== Republican primary ===
2013 Republican primary
Party	Candidate	Votes	%
Republican	Raafat Barsoom	584	100.00%
Total votes		584	100.00%

=== General election ===
2013 general election
Party	Candidate	Votes	%	±%
Democratic	Teresa Ruiz (incumbent)	16,078	78.3%	▼3.9
Republican	Raafat Barsoom	3,636	17.7%	▲3.2
Unity Is Strength	Pablo Olivera	808	3.9%	N/A
Total votes		20,522	100.00%	

== District 30 ==
=== Republican primary ===
2013 Republican primary
Party	Candidate	Votes	%
Republican	Robert Singer (incumbent)	6,710	82.76%
Republican	Harold Herskowitz	1,398	17.24%
Total votes		8,108	100.00%

=== Democratic primary ===
2013 Democratic primary
Party	Candidate	Votes	%
Democratic	William H. Field	1,719	100.00%
Total votes		1,719	100.00%

=== General election ===
2013 general election
Party	Candidate	Votes	%	±%
Republican	Robert Singer (incumbent)	36,563	70.2%	▲4.3
Democratic	William H. Field	15,535	29.8%	▼4.3
Total votes		52,098	100.00%	

== District 31 ==
=== Democratic primary ===
2013 Democratic primary
Party	Candidate	Votes	%
Democratic	Sandra Bolden Cunningham (incumbent)	6,379	100.00%
Total votes		6,379	100.00%

=== Republican primary ===
2013 Republican primary
Party	Candidate	Votes	%
Republican	Maria Karczewski	962	100.00%
Total votes		962	100.00%

=== General election ===
2013 general election
Party	Candidate	Votes	%	±%
Democratic	Sandra Bolden Cunningham (incumbent)	18,822	73.1%	▼7.7
Republican	Maria Karczewski	6,932	26.9%	▲9.6
Total votes		25,754	100.0	

== District 32 ==
=== Democratic primary ===
2013 Democratic primary
Party	Candidate	Votes	%
Democratic	Nicholas Sacco (incumbent)	10,169	88.51%
Democratic	Francisco E. Torres	1,320	11.49%
Total votes		11,489	100.00%

=== Republican primary ===
2013 Republican primary
Party	Candidate	Votes	%
Republican	Paul Castelli	1,356	100.00%
Total votes		1,356	100.00%

=== General election ===
2013 general election
Party	Candidate	Votes	%	±%
Democratic	Nicholas Sacco (incumbent)	20,098	70.2%	▼10.6
Republican	Paul Castelli	8,542	29.8%	▲13.5
Total votes		28,640	100.00%	

== District 33 ==
=== Democratic primary ===
2013 Democratic primary
Party	Candidate	Votes	%
Democratic	Nia Gill (incumbent)	10,434	65.25%
Democratic	Mark C. Alexander	4,310	26.95%
Democratic	Vernon Pullins Jr.	1,248	7.80%
Total votes		15,992	100.00%

=== Republican primary ===
2013 Republican primary
Party	Candidate	Votes	%
Republican	Joseph S. Cupoli	1,018	100.00%
Total votes		1,018	100.00%

=== General election ===
2013 general election
Party	Candidate	Votes	%	±%
Democratic	Nia Gill (incumbent)	26,980	80.7%	▼5.9
Republican	James Sanford	6,460	19.3%	▲5.9
Total votes		33,440	100.00%	

== District 34 ==
=== Democratic primary ===
2013 Democratic primary
Party	Candidate	Votes	%
Democratic	Brian P. Stack (incumbent)	14,394	100.00%
Total votes		14,394	100.00%

=== Republican primary ===
2013 Republican primary
Party	Candidate	Votes	%
Republican	James Saford	1,018	100.00%
Total votes		1,018	100.00%

=== General election ===
2013 general election
Party	Candidate	Votes	%	±%
Democratic	Nia Gill (incumbent)	27,132	73.1%	▼6.5
Republican	Joseph S. Cupoli	9,972	26.9%	▲6.5
Total votes		37,104	100.00%	

== District 35 ==
=== Democratic primary ===
2013 Democratic primary
Party	Candidate	Votes	%
Democratic	Nellie Pou (incumbent)	4,625	100.00%
Total votes		4,625	100.00%

=== Republican primary ===
2013 Republican primary
Party	Candidate	Votes	%
Republican	Lynda Gallashaw	907	61.49%
Democratic	Hector L. Castillo	568	38.51%
Total votes		1,475	100.00%

=== General election ===
2013 general election
Party	Candidate	Votes	%	±%
Democratic	Nellie Pou (incumbent)	22,154	74.1%	▼0.6
Republican	Lynda Gallashaw	7,737	25.9%	▲0.6
Total votes		29,891	100.00%	

== District 36 ==
=== Democratic primary ===
2013 Democratic primary
Party	Candidate	Votes	%
Democratic	Paul Sarlo (incumbent)	3,551	100.00%
Total votes		3,551	100.00%

=== Republican primary ===
2013 Republican primary
Party	Candidate	Votes	%
Republican	Brian A. Fitzhenry	2,412	100.00%
Total votes		2,412	100.00%

=== General election ===
2013 general election
Party	Candidate	Votes	%	±%
Democratic	Paul Sarlo (incumbent)	22,677	59.7%	▼3.0
Republican	Brian A. Fitzhenry	15,293	40.3%	▲3.0
Total votes		37,970	100.00%	

== District 37 ==
=== Democratic primary ===
2013 Democratic primary
Party	Candidate	Votes	%
Democratic	Loretta Weinberg (incumbent)	5,077	100.00%
Total votes		5,077	100.00%

=== Republican primary ===
2013 Republican primary
Party	Candidate	Votes	%
Republican	Paul A. Duggan	2,255	100.00%
Total votes		2,255	100.00%

=== General election ===
2013 general election
Party	Candidate	Votes	%	±%
Democratic	Loretta Weinberg (incumbent)	28,321	68.5%	▼1.4
Republican	Paul A. Duggan	13,038	31.5%	▲1.4
Total votes		41,359	100.00%	

== District 38 ==
=== Democratic primary ===
2013 Democratic primary
Party	Candidate	Votes	%
Democratic	Bob Gordon (incumbent)	3,091	100.00%
Total votes		3,091	100.00%

=== Republican primary ===
2013 Republican primary
Party	Candidate	Votes	%
Republican	Fernando A. Alonso	3,841	100.00%
Total votes		3,841	100.00%

=== General election ===
2013 general election
Party	Candidate	Votes	%	±%
Democratic	Bob Gordon (incumbent)	27,779	51.9	▼1.1
Republican	Fernando A. Alonso	25,767	48.1	▲1.1
Total votes		53,546	100.00%	

== District 39 ==
=== Republican primary ===
2013 Republican primary
Party	Candidate	Votes	%
Republican	Gerald Cardinale (incumbent)	6,857	100.00%
Total votes		6,857	100.00%

=== Democratic primary ===
2013 Democratic primary
Party	Candidate	Votes	%
Democratic	Jan Bidwell	1,902	100.00%
Total votes		1,902	100.00%

=== General election ===
2013 general election
Party	Candidate	Votes	%	±%
Republican	Gerald Cardinale (incumbent)	37,836	63.6%	▲0.1
Democratic	Jane “Jan” Bidwell	21,616	36.4%	▼0.1
Total votes		59,452	100.0	

== District 40 ==
=== Republican primary ===
2013 Republican primary
Party	Candidate	Votes	%
Republican	Kevin J. O'Toole (incumbent)	7,169	100.00%
Total votes		7,169	100.00%

=== Democratic primary ===
2013 Democratic primary
Party	Candidate	Votes	%
Democratic	William Meredith Ashley	2,191	100.00%
Total votes		2,191	100.00%

=== General election ===
2013 general election
Party	Candidate	Votes	%	±%
Republican	Kevin J. O'Toole (incumbent)	37,565	65.9%	▲3.5
Democratic	William Meredith Ashley	19,401	34.1%	▼3.5
Total votes		56,966	100.00%	

== See also ==
- 2013 New Jersey elections
- 2013 New Jersey General Assembly election
