= Walter M. D. Kern =

American politician

Member of the New Jersey General Assembly from the 40th Legislative District
- In office January 9, 1978 – January 9, 1990 Serving with W. Cary Edwards and Nicholas Felice
- Preceded by: C. Gus Rys and John A. Spizziri
- Succeeded by: David C. Russo

Personal details
- Born: March 10, 1937 Jersey City, New Jersey
- Died: June 23, 1998 (aged 61)
- Party: Republican
- Education: Brown University; Columbia Law School
- Occupation: Attorney

Walter M. D. Kern Jr. (March 10, 1937 – June 23, 1998) was an American Republican Party politician who served in the New Jersey General Assembly from 1978 to 1990, where he represented the 40th Legislative District. Disbarred from the practice of law in 1987, Kern faced a primary challenge in 1989 and lost his bid for a chance to run for a seventh term of office.

== Life ==
=== Early life ===
Born in Jersey City, New Jersey, Kern was raised in Ridgewood, New Jersey, where he graduated from Ridgewood High School. He graduated from Brown University and earned his Juris Doctor degree from Columbia Law School in 1962. He performed additional studies in 1965 at The Hague Academy of International Law.

=== Career ===
One of 29 new members taking office in the 80-member General Assembly in 1978, Kern had been a municipal prosecutor and a hearing officer for the New Jersey Civil Service Commission, among other governmental roles, before winning his first legislative office.

The Judiciary Committee rejected efforts in June 1978 to legalize prostitution or to eliminate laws banning obscenity for adults, instead choosing to propose allowing municipalities to create "Combat Zone-style" adult entertainment districts (as in Boston) where obscenity laws for those over the age of 18 would not apply. Kern had advocated for the repeal of obscenity laws, arguing that "Adults should be able to purchase whatever their perverted hearts desire". That same month, Kern was among the co-sponsors of a bill introduced in the legislature that would protect reporters' files and notes from search and seizure, in the wake of a ruling by the United States Supreme Court that would allow authorities to perform such searches. The Assembly voted 48-26 in December 1982 to increase the drinking age from 19 to 21. Kern voted against the legislation, citing the fact that data had shown lower numbers of drunk driving arrests among younger drivers than among older drivers and the ease of access to alcohol for those impacted by the age increase in communities across the New York State border from Bergen County, many of which had targeted teens as customers. Under legislation sponsored by Kern and adopted in 1988, New Jersey became the first state in the nation to require newly cooperative apartments to have a deed demonstrating ownership of each individual unit as personal property, as a way of minimizing legal entanglements between the co-op as a whole and any single property owner.

Kern was elected in 1977, 1979 and 1981 with W. Cary Edwards, though Edwards didn't take the seat in 1982 to accept a position as counsel to Governor of New Jersey Thomas Kean. Nicholas Felice won a special election in March 1982 to fill Edwards' seat and was elected with Kern in 1983, 1985 and 1987.

=== Disbarment ===
Kern was Chairman of the Assembly's Judiciary Committee when he was disbarred in December 1987, little more than a month after he had been re-elected to his fifth term of office, after an audit determined that he had misappropriated client funds. Despite consenting to the disbarment, Kern said that he was innocent and that he would continue to serve in the Assembly. Kern claimed that he was the victim of a witch hunt based on an argument between him and Robert N. Wilentz, the Chief Justice of the New Jersey Supreme Court, over legislation proposed by Kern just days before the audit that would have created new positions for judges in New Jersey Superior Court. Kern noted that any discrepancies in client funds identified in the audit had been reimbursed. Days after his disbarment, he met with Speaker of the Assembly and agreed to withdraw his name for consideration for a second two-year term heading the Judiciary Committee, citing the impact of the publicity about the action impacting Kern's ability to lead the committee.

In the June 1989 Republican Party primary, Kern came in fifth place with 3,099 votes, behind Nicholas Felice and David C. Russo, who won the nomination for the two seats from the districts with 8,956 and 7,937 votes respectively, as well as behind Michael DuHaime and William J. Vichiconti, who ran together and received 3,611 and 3,386 votes respectively.
