= W. Cary Edwards =

American politician

Attorney General of New Jersey
- In office January 21, 1986 – January 19, 1989
- Governor: Thomas Kean
- Preceded by: Irwin I. Kimmelman
- Succeeded by: Peter N. Perretti Jr.

Member of the New Jersey General Assembly from the 40th district
- In office January 10, 1978 – January 12, 1982
- Preceded by: C. Gus Rys; John A. Spizziri
- Succeeded by: Nicholas Felice

Personal details
- Born: July 20, 1944 Paterson, New Jersey or Ridgewood, New Jersey, U.S.
- Died: October 20, 2010 (aged 66) Oakland, New Jersey, U.S.
- Party: Republican
- Spouse: Lynn Cozzolino (m. 1970)

William Cary Edwards (July 20, 1944 – October 20, 2010) was a New Jersey politician who served as the Attorney General of New Jersey from 1986 to 1989.

== Early life ==
He was born on July 20, 1944, in Paterson, New Jersey or Ridgewood, New Jersey. Edwards grew up in Fair Lawn, New Jersey and was raised Catholic by his mother, Virginia, who had converted to Roman Catholicism. His parents separated when he was 11. He and his siblings (a brother, James and a sister, Cheryl) moved with their mother to East Paterson (now Elmwood Park, New Jersey). He graduated from St. Luke's High School in Ho-Ho-Kus, later studying business administration at Seton Hall University, where he graduated in 1967. He received his law degree from Seton Hall University School of Law in 1970 and was admitted to the New Jersey bar the same year.

== Career ==
Edwards married Lynn Cozzolino in 1970. In 1974 they moved to Oakland, and a year later Edwards was elected councilman there. In 1977 he was elected to the New Jersey General Assembly. He would serve three terms in the Assembly and be named assistant minority leader. Thomas Kean served as Edwards' mentor in the Assembly, and when Kean became Governor of New Jersey in 1982, he selected Edwards as his chief counsel.

Kean then named Edwards Attorney General, and he was sworn in on January 21, 1986, the day of Kean's second inauguration. As Attorney General, Edwards sought to increase the size of the Department of Law and Public Safety; initiated a new anti-drug program; instituted a task force to combat organized crime; planned a virtual overhaul of the Division of Motor Vehicles; and confronted problems such as insurance fraud and state land use planning.

The New Jersey Attorney General's office and the Bureau of Alcohol, Tobacco and Firearms created a Task Force, named "Operation Iceman", to apprehend murderer Richard Kuklinski. It led to the arrest of Kuklinski who was charged with five murder counts and six weapons violations, as well as attempted murder, robbery, and attempted robbery. Edwards spoke to the media in a press conference about the case describing them as murders for profit. ″He set individuals up for business deals, they would disappear and the money would end up in his hands.″.

Edwards ran for Governor of New Jersey in 1989, losing to Jim Courter in the Republican primary. He ran again in 1993, losing out to Christine Todd Whitman, who went on to victory in the general election. In 1995, Edwards opened a law firm, Edwards & Caldwell, where he worked until 2008.

In 1997, Whitman named Edwards to the New Jersey State Commission of Investigation. In 2004, Governor Richard Codey appointed him chairman of the commission.

== Death ==
Edwards died at his home in Oakland, New Jersey from cancer on October 20, 2010, aged 66. He was survived by his wife and their two daughters.

New Jersey General Assembly
Preceded by C. Gus Rys; John A. Spizziri	Member of the New Jersey General Assembly from the 40th district 1978–1982; Served alongside: Walter M. D. Kern	Succeeded by Nicholas Felice
Legal offices
Preceded by Irwin I. Kimmelman	Attorney General of New Jersey; 1986–1989	Succeeded by Peter N. Perretti Jr.
