= Nicholas Felice =

American politician (1927–2021)

Member of the New Jersey General Assembly from the 40th district
- In office May 3, 1982 – January 8, 2002 Serving with Walter M. D. Kern; David C. Russo
- Preceded by: W. Cary Edwards
- Succeeded by: Kevin J. O'Toole

Personal details
- Born: February 5, 1927 Passaic, New Jersey, U.S.
- Died: August 24, 2021 (aged 94)
- Party: Republican

Nicholas R. Felice (February 5, 1927 – August 24, 2021) was an American Republican Party politician who represented the 40th Legislative District in the New Jersey General Assembly from 1982 to 2002, in addition to serving as mayor of Fair Lawn.

After graduating from Passaic High School, Felice earned his undergraduate degree from Fairleigh Dickinson University with a major in Electrical Engineering. He served in the United States Army from 1945 to 1947 and saw duty in the Pacific theater as a Technical Sergeant.

A full-time legislator, Felice served in his native Fair Lawn on its Planning Board from 1965 to 1967 and again from 1972 to 1975, on both the Health Advisory Board and Youth Advisory Board from 1967 to 1975, and on the Local Assistance Board from 1965 to 1975. He was elected to the Fair Lawn Borough Council, serving from 1967 to 1972, as Mayor from 1972 to 1974 and then as Deputy Mayor in 1974 and 1975.

He was elected to the Assembly in 1983 together with Republican Walter M. D. Kern, with the pair re-elected in 1985 and 1987. He won re-election in 1989, 1991, 1993, 1995, 1997 and 1999 with David C. Russo as his running mate. Felice served in the General Assembly from 1982 to 2002, with posts as Assistant Majority Leader from 1986 to 1989, as Assistant Minority Leader in 1990 and 1991, as Deputy Speaker from 1992 to 1995 and as Speaker Pro Tempore starting in 1996. He served as Chair of the Health Committee, on the Environment Committee and on the Legislative Services Commission.

In redistricting following the 2001 Census, Fair Lawn was relocated to the 38th Legislative District. In a split decision, Republican incumbent Rose Marie Heck won re-election with 27,055 votes (25.33% of the total) and Democrat Matt Ahearn with 26,919 votes (25.20%) took the second seat. Democrat Kay Nest came in third with 26,587 votes (24.89%) and Felice was also out of the money with 26,252 votes (24.58%).

After leaving the Assembly, Felice was named in 2001 as legislative liaison to the New Jersey Board of Public Utilities, a post with an $85,000 annual salary.

Then a resident of Mahwah, Felice died on August 24, 2021.

New Jersey General Assembly
Preceded by W. Cary Edwards	New Jersey State Assemblyman - District 40; 1982–2002	Succeeded by Kevin J. O'Toole
