= New Jersey's 40th legislative district =

American legislative district

- Senator: Kristin Corrado (R)
- Assembly members: Al Barlas (R); Christopher DePhillips (R)
- Registration: 31.5% Republican; 30.9% Democratic; 37.5% unaffiliated
- Demographics: 76.4% White; 2.4% Black/African American; 0.2% Native American; 8.4% Asian; 0.0% Hawaiian/Pacific Islander; 4.4% Other race; 8.2% Two or more races; 12.4% Hispanic
- Population: 218,353
- Voting-age population: 172,104
- Registered voters: 184,507

New Jersey's 40th legislative district is one of 40 districts that make up the map for the New Jersey Legislature. It covers the Bergen County municipalities of Franklin Lakes, Ridgewood, and Wyckoff; the Essex County municipalities of Caldwell, Cedar Grove, Essex Fells, Fairfield, North Caldwell, Verona, and West Caldwell; and the Passaic County municipalities of Little Falls, Hawthorne, Totowa, Wayne and Woodland Park.

== Demographic information ==
As of the 2020 United States census, the district had a population of 218,353, of whom 172,104 (78.8%) were of voting age. The racial makeup of the district was 166,763 (76.4%) White, 5,141 (2.4%) African American, 455 (0.2%) Native American, 18,320 (8.4%) Asian, 39 (0.0%) Pacific Islander, 9,672 (4.4%) from some other race, and 17,963 (8.2%) from two or more races. Hispanic or Latino of any race were 27,178 (12.4%) of the population.

The district had 191,061 registered voters as of February 1, 2025, of whom 70,458 (37.5%) were registered as unaffiliated, 60,103 (31.5%) were registered as Republicans, 58,948 (30.9%) were registered as Democrats and 1,552 (0.8%) were registered to other parties.

== Political representation ==
For the 2026–2027 session, the 40th legislative district of the New Jersey Legislature is represented in the State Senate by Kristin Corrado (R, Totowa) and in the General Assembly by Al Barlas (R, Cedar Grove) and Christopher DePhillips (R, Wyckoff).

The legislative district overlaps with New Jersey's 5th, New Jersey's 9th, New Jersey's 10th, and 11th congressional districts.

== Apportionment history ==
Upon the creation of the 40-district legislative map in 1973, the 40th district consisted of western Bergen County running from Elmwood Park north along the county line to Ridgewood, then in addition to Ho-Ho-Kus and Midland Park, consisted of the larger municipalities in the northwest corner of the county. Following the 1981 redistricting, the 40th lost Elmwood Park, Ho-Ho-Kus, and Allendale, but picked up Upper Saddle River and the Passaic County boroughs of North Haledon, Pompton Lakes, Bloomingdale, and Wanaque. In the 1991 redistricting, Ramsey, Upper Saddle River, North Haledon, Pompton Lakes, and Bloomingdale were shifted to other districts, but Washington Township, Waldwick, Ringwood, and West Milford became a part of the district. Under the 2001 redistricting, the Bergen County portion of the 40th district became smaller only running along the county border from Ridgewood to Mahwah (plus Midland Park), but in addition to Ringwood and Wanaque, passed through the center of the county picking up Wayne and Little Falls and for the first time included Essex County by encompassing Cedar Grove and Verona. Mahwah and Oakland were eliminated from the Bergen County portion in the 2011 redistricting but Allendale, Ho-Ho-Kus, and Waldwick were added, more of central Passaic County was added including Totowa and Woodland Park, and Morris County's Pequannock were included within the district.

Since 1973, the district has always leaned Republican, never electing a Democrat through the 2023 general election. It is one of only nine state legislative districts statewide that has never elected more than one political party to Trenton, and with the election of a Democrat to the 16th in 2015, the only district to have elected only Republicans. It was also one of four districts in New Jersey to elect all Republicans (at the state level) in the 1974 Watergate Democratic wave.

Senator Corrado has served the district since October 2017. Previously the Clerk of Passaic County, she was appointed to replace three-term incumbent Kevin J. O'Toole of Cedar Grove, after his appointment to the Board of Commissioners of The Port Authority of New York and New Jersey.

Kevin J. Rooney, then the mayor of Wyckoff, New Jersey, was appointed in December 2016 to replace multi-term incumbent Scott Rumana of Wayne after his appointment to the bench of the Superior Court of New Jersey.

Assemblyman DePhillips, a former mayor of Wyckoff, served in the district since January 2018. First elected in 2017, DePhillips replaced David C. Russo of Ridgewood, who was first elected in 1989 and served until he left office in 2018 after his fourteenth term.

== Election history ==
=== 2023 ===
In 2023, the Republican ticket of incumbent Chris DePhillips (seeking his fourth two-year term) and Essex County GOP chairman Al Barlas ran against the Democratic team of Giovanna Irizarry (the Woodland Park school district's director of special education) and Wyckoff small business owner Jennifer Marrinan for two seats in the general assembly; meanwhile, Hawthorne school board member Jennifer Ehrentraut ran as a Democrat for state senate against Republican incumbent Kristin Corrado. In New Jersey all state legislature seats were up for re-election in the 2023 cycle.

Following Al Barlas making public his intention to run, Wyckoff's Kevin Rooney decided against seeking re-election to his position representing the 40th district in New Jersey's general assembly; the New Jersey Globe asserted that Rooney's decision was due to redistricting including six more Essex County towns in the 40th than previously (a process that Barlas co-chaired), thus meriting a representative from the county. In January 2023, just two months after announcing his candidacy, Barlas, "...raised a mammoth $112,844...making the first-time candidate one of the top GOP fundraisers in the state"; meanwhile, Corrado had amassed $117,457 and DePhillips had $145,095 (including, in both latter cases, leftover funds from previous campaigns). If Barlas is elected, he would be the first South Asian Republican in New Jersey's legislature.

In July 2023, the New Jersey Building and Construction Trades Council (a representative body for, "...13 Local Building Trades Councils, more than 100 local unions and over 150,000 rank and file members,") revoked its endorsement of the Democratic assembly candidates, with its president, Bill Mullen, composing a letter that stated, “...we appreciate your support for New Jersey’s...union construction and allied trades...[but] the NJBCTC executive board met...and [unanimously] voted to endorse your Republican opponents in this year’s election...Please consider this communication a formal withdrawal of the NJBCTC’s endorsement". Democratic Bergen County commissioner Tom Sullivan (who was, at the time, also an IBEW union president) fought for Irizarry and Marrinan being endorsed whereas former Democratic Senate President Steve Sweeney (who was also, at the time, head of the state’s Ironworkers union) advocated for the Republicans being endorsed. Local media called the representative body's flip "a highly unusual move" and a "devastating blow for the two newcomers".

In October 2023, the Corrado-DePhillips-Barlas slate released a mailer where they boasted that, "...Corrado has led the charge to expose Murphy's deadly policies that cost thousands of...lives during the pandemic," that, "...DePhillips is pushing legislation to slash the state's oppressive tax on businesses," and that, "...Barlas is running to restore commonsense values to our local schools and empower parents to be at the center of their child's education"; later the mailer tied president Joe Biden to rising inflation (via a Fox News headline) and Phil Murphy to New Jersey schools not, "...tell[ing] parents about student gender choices," (by way of a northjersey.com headline), calling them "radical Democrats" under whose leadership, "Our economy is tanking, and our values are under attack".

=== 2021 ===
In the November 2021 election, Republican senator Kristin Corrado (with 47,230 votes) won re-election to her second four-year term, fending off a challenge from Democratic Ridgewood deputy mayor Michael Sedon (who earned 30,237), while the slate of Republican assemblymen Kevin Rooney (with 46,004 votes) and Chris DePhillips (with 45,246) won re-election to their third full terms, defeating the Democratic team of Waldwick councilwoman Nicole McNamara (who earned 31,066 votes) and former assistant Bergen County prosecutor Genny Allard (who earned 30,606).

For 2021, The New Jersey State FMBA (a union representing career firefighters, EMTs, and dispatchers) backed the three Republicans in a slate of mixed Republican and Democrat endorsements, and the New Jersey Fraternal Order of Police (also in a politically-heterogenous round of endorsements) chose to support the three Republicans as well. Meanwhile, the three Democrats were endorsed by the New Jersey Democratic State Committee LGBTQ Caucus (to which the candidates responded that they were "humbly honored" as Democrats, "...who value equality for all Americans of every race, sexual orientation, and gender identity"); the Progressive Turnout Project endorsed the three Democrats along with 54 other New Jersey state-level progressives; and after, "Challengers...respon[ded] to [their] application and demonstrated support for women’s issues in their official campaign platform," the National Organization for Women of New Jersey PAC endorsed Democrat Genny Allard individually.

=== 2019 ===
In the November 2019 election, Republican assemblymen Kevin Rooney (with 22,562 votes) and Chris DePhillips (with 21,955) won re-election to their second full terms, defeating the Democratic slate of former Bergen County Freeholder Julie O'Brien (who earned 17,557 votes) and Little Falls councilwoman Maria Martini Cordonnier (who earned 17,332).

In late October 2019, DePhillips and Rooney skipped a debate hosted by the League of Women Voters, claiming that the question-selection process was "broken" and "unfair" because an earlier debate sponsored by the Wayne League of Women Voters had allowed, "...a local Democratic candidate to be part of a group that was screening questions and determining what questions would be asked". DePhillips and Rooney claimed they had spoken to the League following the Wayne debate and that, "The LWV...agreed to not allow questions from elected officials from either party," but that the organization rejected other structural requests they had made — pushing the two candidates to back down. Cordonnier and O'Brien criticized the Republicans' absence, arguing that, “...refusing to engage with [us] shows a lack of respect for their constituents and their office...As an elected official, you need to answer for your record even if you don’t like the questions".

Ridgewood Councilman Micheal Sedon (alongside Cordonnier) won the Democratic primary to challenge DePhillips and Rooney in the general election, but Sedon dropped out of the race between June and September 2019; in September, Democratic County Committee members selected O'Brien to replace Sedon on the ballot.

=== 2017 ===
In the November 2017 election, Republican state senator Kristin Corrado (with 33,495) defeated Democrat and Garfield city manager Thomas Duch (who earned 26,060) in a race for her first full four-year term in New Jersey's upper chamber; meanwhile, Republican assemblyman Kevin Rooney (with 31,170 votes) won election to his first full two-year term as his running-mate, a former Wyckoff mayor, Chris DePhillips (with 30,610) won a seat for the first time, defeating the Democratic team of Christine Ordway (who earned 27,092 votes) and Ridgewood-restaurant-owner Paul Vagianos (who earned 26,737). Following Election Day (on which he became governor-elect), Democrat Phil Murphy named Ordway to his transition team's healthcare board — a role which involved, "...policy analysis and [making] recommendations on...state issues and initiatives as the new administration prepare[d] to take office".

In October 2017, the three Republicans faced off against the three Democratic candidates in a forum hosted by the Bergen County League of Women Voters in Ridgewood. At the forum, the Republicans argued that, "...affordable-housing obligations should be left up to local governments...[and cited] the lack of vacant land as a hurdle to increasing affordable-housing stock," whereas Vagianos claimed affordable housing requirements should be handled by state courts and Duch said that such housing, "is not evil" while touting the presence of affordable units in Garfield, the city he managed; Rooney supported extending the two-percent yearly salary increase cap on police and firefighters to manage municipal expenses while the Democrats blamed New Jersey's public-salary/pension crisis on, "...Chris Christie, who they said underfunded the state pension system"; Vagianos and Ordway brought up funding, "...the Hudson Tunnel Project...a new commuter tunnel between New Jersey and Midtown Manhattan," arguing it, "...would be a boon to local real estate values and the economy"; and the Democrats said they were committed to, "...fully funding Planned Parenthood in the state of New Jersey," in part in an effort to make more accessible, "...preventive care services for low-income women across the state," — which DePhillips contended (while supporting preventative care) was a distortion of the situation, as, "...the issue 'is about abortion'," while Corrado pointed out that Planned Parenthood is not the only institution offering preventative care in the state.

In July 2017, Republican county committee representatives from 40th district towns selected Passaic County clerk Kristin Corrado to fill the remaining several months of what had been Kevin O'Toole's senate term until he resigned earlier in the month. Corrado's appointment came after she won a contentious primary in June (to be the Republican nominee for state senate in the general election), in which she and Paul DiGaetano (a former seven-term assemblyman and, at the time, the Bergen County Republican party chairman) were each supported by divergent segments of the district's Republican leadership.

In October 2016, Assemblyman Scott Rumana resigned with a year remaining in his term after being confirmed as a judge on New Jersey's Superior Court. In November, Wyckoff mayor Kevin Rooney was appointed (in a 104-96 vote against Mike Marotta) to fill the remainder of the unexpired term; according to The Record, Rooney’s appointment was, "clearly a blow" to local GOP leadership, as the contest, "...was seen as a proxy fight between rival GOP camps [considering that] Marotta had the backing of three county chairmen...[and was] a longtime Rumana ally [whereas] Rooney had the political blessing of [40th district state senator] O’Toole and the backing of Peter Murphy, the maverick GOP leader from Totowa...[and] enemy of Rumana".

=== Table ===
Session	Senate	General Assembly	
1974–1975	Garrett W. Hagedorn (R)	C. Gus Rys (R)	John A. Spizziri (R)
1976–1977	Garrett W. Hagedorn (R)	C. Gus Rys (R)	John A. Spizziri (R)
1978–1979	Garrett W. Hagedorn (R)	W. Cary Edwards (R)	Walter M. D. Kern (R)
1980–1981	Garrett W. Hagedorn (R)	W. Cary Edwards (R)	Walter M. D. Kern (R)
1982–1983	Garrett W. Hagedorn (R)	Seat vacant (Note: W. Cary Edwards was reelected to his Assembly seat in 1981 but declined to take his seat in order to become Governor-elect Thomas Kean's counsel)	Walter M. D. Kern (R)
1982–1983	Garrett W. Hagedorn (R)	Nicholas Felice (R) (Note: Elected to the Assembly in March 1982 special election, sworn in on May 3, 1982)	Walter M. D. Kern (R)
1984–1985	Garrett W. Hagedorn (R) (Note: Died August 9, 1985)	Nicholas Felice (R)	Walter M. D. Kern (R)
1984–1985	Henry McNamara (R) (Note: Elected to the Senate in November 1985 special election, sworn in on November 18, 1985)	Nicholas Felice (R)	Walter M. D. Kern (R)
1986–1987	Henry McNamara (R)	Nicholas Felice (R)	Walter M. D. Kern (R)
1988–1989	Henry McNamara (R)	Nicholas Felice (R)	Walter M. D. Kern (R)
1990–1991	Henry McNamara (R)	Nicholas Felice (R)	David C. Russo (R)
1992–1993	Henry McNamara (R)	Nicholas Felice (R)	David C. Russo (R)
1994–1995	Henry McNamara (R)	Nicholas Felice (R)	David C. Russo (R)
1996–1997	Henry McNamara (R)	Nicholas Felice (R)	David C. Russo (R)
1998–1999	Henry McNamara (R)	Nicholas Felice (R)	David C. Russo (R)
2000–2001	Henry McNamara (R)	Nicholas Felice (R)	David C. Russo (R)
2002–2003	Henry McNamara (R)	Kevin J. O'Toole (R)	David C. Russo (R)
2004–2005	Henry McNamara (R)	Kevin J. O'Toole (R)	David C. Russo (R)
2006–2007	Henry McNamara (R)	Kevin J. O'Toole (R)	David C. Russo (R)
2008–2009	Kevin J. O'Toole (R)	Scott Rumana (R)	David C. Russo (R)
2010–2011	Kevin J. O'Toole (R)	Scott Rumana (R)	David C. Russo (R)
2012–2013	Kevin J. O'Toole (R)	Scott Rumana (R)	David C. Russo (R)
2014–2015	Kevin J. O'Toole (R) (Note: Resigned July 1, 2017 to become a Commissioner of The Port Authority of New York and New Jersey)	Scott Rumana (R)	David C. Russo (R)
2016–2017	Kevin J. O'Toole (R)	Scott Rumana (R) (Note: Resigned October 20, 2016 to become a Superior Court judge)	David C. Russo (R)
2016–2017	Kristin Corrado (R) (Note: Appointed to the Senate on October 5, 2017)	Kevin J. Rooney (R) (Note: Appointed to the Assembly on December 12, 2016)	David C. Russo (R)
2018–2019	Kristin Corrado (R)	Kevin J. Rooney (R)	Christopher DePhillips (R)
2020–2021	Kristin Corrado (R)	Kevin J. Rooney (R)	Christopher DePhillips (R)
2022–2023	Kristin Corrado (R)	Kevin J. Rooney (R)	Christopher DePhillips (R)
2024–2025	Kristin Corrado (R)	Al Barlas (R)	Christopher DePhillips (R)
2026–2027	Kristin Corrado (R)	Al Barlas (R)	Christopher DePhillips (R)

== Election results ==
=== Senate ===
2021 New Jersey general election
Party	Candidate	Votes	%	±%
Republican	Kristin M. Corrado	47,230	61.0	▲4.8
Democratic	Michael A. Sedon	30,237	39.0	▼4.8
Total votes		77,467	100.0	

New Jersey general election, 2017
Party	Candidate	Votes	%	±%
Republican	Kristin M. Corrado	33,495	56.2	▼9.7
Democratic	Thomas Duch	26,060	43.8	▲9.7
Total votes		59,555	100.0	

New Jersey general election, 2013
Party	Candidate	Votes	%	±%
Republican	Kevin J. O'Toole	37,565	65.9	▲3.5
Democratic	William Meredith Ashley	19,401	34.1	▼3.5
Total votes		56,966	100.0	

2011 New Jersey general election
Party	Candidate	Votes	%
Republican	Kevin J. O'Toole	22,821	62.4
Democratic	John Zunic	13,733	37.6
Total votes		36,554	100.0

2007 New Jersey general election
Party	Candidate	Votes	%	±%
Republican	Kevin J. O'Toole	26,214	66.2	▲1.7
Democratic	John Zunic	13,395	33.8	▼1.7
Total votes		39,609	100.0	

2003 New Jersey general election
Party	Candidate	Votes	%	±%
Republican	Henry P. McNamara	24,478	64.5	▲2.2
Democratic	Matt Rogers	13,493	35.5	▼2.2
Total votes		37,971	100.0	

2001 New Jersey general election
Party	Candidate	Votes	%
Republican	Henry P. McNamara	39,815	62.3
Democratic	John "Jack" Nigro	24,122	37.7
Total votes		63,937	100.0

1997 New Jersey general election
Party	Candidate	Votes	%	±%
Republican	Henry P. McNamara	42,751	67.5	▼0.2
Democratic	Michael Greenspan	20,537	32.5	▲0.2
Total votes		63,288	100.0	

1993 New Jersey general election
Party	Candidate	Votes	%	±%
Republican	Henry P. McNamara	49,041	67.7	▼7.8
Democratic	Bea O’ Rourke	23,380	32.3	▲7.8
Total votes		72,421	100.0	

1991 New Jersey general election
Party	Candidate	Votes	%
Republican	Henry P. McNamara	36,666	75.5
Democratic	Frank R. Lucas	11,884	24.5
Total votes		48,550	100.0

1987 New Jersey general election
Party	Candidate	Votes	%	±%
Republican	Henry P. McNamara	29,365	71.9	▲3.2
Democratic	Terry R. Driller	11,453	28.1	▼3.2
Total votes		40,818	100.0	

Special election, November 5, 1985
Party	Candidate	Votes	%	±%
Republican	Henry P. McNamara	34,998	68.7	▲3.2
Democratic	Charles F. Ryan	15,923	31.3	▼3.2
Total votes		50,921	100.0	

1983 New Jersey general election
Party	Candidate	Votes	%	±%
Republican	Garrett W. Hagedorn	28,755	65.5	▼1.3
Democratic	Charles F. Ryan	15,152	34.5	▲1.3
Total votes		43,907	100.0	

1981 New Jersey general election
Party	Candidate	Votes	%
Republican	Garrett W. Hagedorn	42,014	66.8
Democratic	Mitchell Kahn	20,835	33.2
Total votes		62,849	100.0

1977 New Jersey general election
Party	Candidate	Votes	%	±%
Republican	Garrett W. Hagedorn	29,689	57.8	▲1.6
Democratic	Anthony D. Andora	21,009	40.9	▼2.9
Independent Middle America	Victor E. Virgens	664	1.3	N/A
Total votes		51,362	100.0	

1973 New Jersey general election
Party	Candidate	Votes	%
Republican	Garrett W. Hagedorn	32,566	56.2
Democratic	Robert A. Pennachio	25,394	43.8
Total votes		57,960	100.0

=== General Assembly ===
2021 New Jersey general election
Party	Candidate	Votes	%	±%
Republican	Kevin J. Rooney	46,004	30.1	▲1.7
Republican	Christopher P. DePhillips	45,246	29.6	▲2.0
Democratic	Nicole McNamara	31,066	20.3	▼1.8
Democratic	Genevieve Allard	30,606	20.0	▼1.8
Total votes		152,922	100.0	

2019 New Jersey general election
Party	Candidate	Votes	%	±%
Republican	Kevin J. Rooney	22,562	28.4	▲1.6
Republican	Christopher P. DePhillips	21,955	27.6	▲1.3
Democratic	Julie O’Brien	17,557	22.1	▼1.2
Democratic	Maria Martini Cordonnier	17,332	21.8	▼1.2
Total votes		79,406	100.0	

New Jersey general election, 2017
Party	Candidate	Votes	%	±%
Republican	Kevin J. Rooney	31,170	26.8	▼0.8
Republican	Christopher P. DePhillips	30,610	26.3	▼1.7
Democratic	Christine Ordway	27,092	23.3	▲1.0
Democratic	Paul Vagianos	26,737	23.0	▲0.8
You Tell Me	Anthony J. Pellechia	748	0.6	N/A
Total votes		116,357	100.0	

New Jersey general election, 2015
Party	Candidate	Votes	%	±%
Republican	David C. Russo	19,675	28.0	▼4.1
Republican	Scott T. Rumana	19,357	27.6	▼4.5
Democratic	Christine Ordway	15,629	22.3	▲3.9
Democratic	Paul Vagianos	15,573	22.2	▲4.9
Total votes		70,234	100.0	

New Jersey general election, 2013
Party	Candidate	Votes	%	±%
Republican	Scott T. Rumana	36,174	32.1	▲2.4
Republican	David C. Russo	36,143	32.1	▲1.8
Democratic	Anthony J. Galietti	20,779	18.4	▼2.7
Democratic	Leo Arcuri	19,542	17.3	▼1.6
Total votes		112,638	100.0	

New Jersey general election, 2011
Party	Candidate	Votes	%
Republican	David C. Russo	22,125	30.3
Republican	Scott T. Rumana	21,678	29.7
Democratic	Cassandra Lazzara	15,412	21.1
Democratic	William J. Brennan	13,767	18.9
Total votes		72,982	100.0

New Jersey general election, 2009
Party	Candidate	Votes	%	±%
Republican	Scott T. Rumana	42,359	33.2	▲0.8
Republican	David C. Russo	42,143	33.0	▲0.8
Democratic	John Agostinelli	21,737	17.0	▼0.6
Democratic	Mark Bombace	21,277	16.7	▲1.0
Total votes		127,516	100.0	

New Jersey general election, 2007
Party	Candidate	Votes	%	±%
Republican	Scott T. Rumana	25,372	32.4	▲1.8
Republican	David C. Russo	25,208	32.2	▲1.7
Democratic	Lisa Sciancalepore	13,751	17.6	▼2.4
Democratic	Zonie LeSane	12,339	15.7	▼3.1
Libertarian	Derek DeMarco	855	1.1	N/A
Libertarian	Paul Tahan	819	1.0	N/A
Total votes		78,344	100.0	

New Jersey general election, 2005
Party	Candidate	Votes	%	±%
Republican	Kevin J. O'Toole	36,957	30.6	▼1.5
Republican	David C. Russo	36,820	30.5	▼1.8
Democratic	Jane Bidwell	24,117	20.0	▲3.1
Democratic	Ronald Beattie	22,732	18.8	▲1.8
Total votes		120,626	100.0	

New Jersey general election, 2003
Party	Candidate	Votes	%	±%
Republican	David C. Russo	23,965	32.3	▲1.6
Republican	Kevin J. O'Toole	23,865	32.1	▲1.9
Democratic	Michael Bradley	12,624	17.0	▼2.9
Democratic	Jane Bidwell Gaunt	12,535	16.9	▼2.3
Green	Philip A. Passantino	1,256	1.7	N/A
Total votes		74,245	100.0	

New Jersey general election, 2001
Party	Candidate	Votes	%
Republican	David C. Russo	38,627	30.7
Republican	Kevin J. O'Toole	38,058	30.2
Democratic	Frank Delvecchio	25,027	19.9
Democratic	Donna Kurdock	24,201	19.2
Total votes		125,913	100.0

New Jersey general election, 1999
Party	Candidate	Votes	%	±%
Republican	Nicholas R. Felice	21,175	30.6	▼3.1
Republican	David C. Russo	20,897	30.2	▼2.8
Democratic	Frank Del Vecchio	13,528	19.6	▲3.6
Democratic	Joshua Levine	12,820	18.5	▲2.8
Conservative	Robert I. Unanue	705	1.0	▲0.1
Total votes		69,125	100.0	

New Jersey general election, 1997
Party	Candidate	Votes	%	±%
Republican	Nicholas R. Felice	42,207	33.7	0.0
Republican	David C. Russo	41,261	33.0	▲1.1
Democratic	Dawn Savarese	20,013	16.0	▼1.2
Democratic	Peter Goetz	19,680	15.7	▲0.6
Conservative	Mike Best	1,088	0.9	▼1.2
Conservative	Walter Renninghoff	961	0.8	N/A
Total votes		125,210	100.0	

New Jersey general election, 1995
Party	Candidate	Votes	%	±%
Republican	Nicholas R. Felice	22,518	33.7	▼1.3
Republican	David C. Russo	21,312	31.9	▼2.3
Democratic	Joan P. Larkin	11,464	17.2	▲1.5
Democratic	Martin Etler	10,112	15.1	0.0
Conservative	Michael A. Best	1,426	2.1	N/A
Total votes		66,832	100.0	

New Jersey general election, 1993
Party	Candidate	Votes	%	±%
Republican	Nicholas R. Felice	49,340	35.0	▼3.3
Republican	David C. Russo	48,200	34.2	▼3.2
Democratic	Jack Dabney	22,167	15.7	▲3.4
Democratic	Barry Winston	21,316	15.1	▲3.1
Total votes		141,023	100.0	

1991 New Jersey general election
Party	Candidate	Votes	%
Republican	Nicholas R. Felice	36,573	38.3
Republican	David C. Russo	35,650	37.4
Democratic	William J. Branagh	11,741	12.3
Democratic	Martin Etler	11,459	12.0
Total votes		95,423	100.0

1989 New Jersey general election
Party	Candidate	Votes	%	±%
Republican	Nicholas R. Felice	33,746	28.9	▼4.7
Republican	David C. Russo	33,432	28.6	▼6.0
Democratic	Paul Lief Rosengren	25,106	21.5	▲5.9
Democratic	Linda Villano	24,438	20.9	▲5.5
Total votes		116,722	100.0	

1987 New Jersey general election
Party	Candidate	Votes	%	±%
Republican	Walter M. D. Kern, Jr.	27,767	34.6	▼1.3
Republican	Nicholas R. Felice	26,980	33.6	▼2.2
Democratic	Michael S. Taaffe	12,535	15.6	▲1.2
Democratic	Edward F. Seavers, Jr.	12,366	15.4	▲1.6
Michael Harris Libertarian	Michael Harris	538	0.7	N/A
Total votes		80,186	100.0	

1985 New Jersey general election
Party	Candidate	Votes	%	±%
Republican	Walter M. D. Kern, Jr.	36,476	35.9	▲1.3
Republican	Nicholas R. Felice	36,369	35.8	▲1.9
Democratic	Judy Miller	14,590	14.4	▼1.6
Democratic	Carmine J. Cicchino	14,050	13.8	▼1.7
Total votes		101,485	100.0	

New Jersey general election, 1983
Party	Candidate	Votes	%	±%
Republican	Walter M. D. Kern, Jr.	29,878	34.6	▼0.8
Republican	Nicholas R. Felice	29,241	33.9	▼2.1
Democratic	Thomas J. Barrett	13,769	16.0	▲1.6
Democratic	Douglas J. Stiles	13,405	15.5	▲1.3
Total votes		86,293	100.0	

Special election, March 16, 1982
Party	Candidate	Votes	%
Republican	Nicholas R. Felice	7,746	57.1
Democratic	Emil L. Porfido	5,814	42.9
Total votes		13,560	100.0

New Jersey general election, 1981
Party	Candidate	Votes	%
Republican	Cary Edwards	44,415	36.0
Republican	Walter M.D. Kern, Jr.	43,692	35.4
Democratic	Arthur R. Carmano, Jr.	17,761	14.4
Democratic	C. Charles Christofilis	17,467	14.2
Total votes		123,335	100.0

New Jersey general election, 1979
Party	Candidate	Votes	%	±%
Republican	W. Cary Edwards	29,946	35.0	▲6.5
Republican	Walter M.D. Kern, Jr.	29,084	34.0	▲6.5
Democratic	Eleanor M. Rooney	13,410	15.7	▼6.0
Democratic	Jane Tremble Baumann	13,174	15.4	▼6.0
Total votes		85,614	100.0	

New Jersey general election, 1977
Party	Candidate	Votes	%	±%
Republican	W. Cary Edwards	28,510	28.5	▼1.6
Republican	Walter M. D. Kern, Jr.	27,536	27.5	▼2.4
Democratic	Chris Burdick	21,794	21.7	▲1.6
Democratic	John M. Henderson	21,423	21.4	▲1.6
Libertarian	Susan Raggi	533	0.5	N/A
Libertarian	Daniel L. Bauch	413	0.4	N/A
Total votes		100,209	100.0	

New Jersey general election, 1975
Party	Candidate	Votes	%	±%
Republican	John A. Spizziri	31,614	30.1	▲5.0
Republican	C. Gus Rys	31,470	29.9	▲3.7
Democratic	Rose Brunetto	21,170	20.1	▼4.7
Democratic	Paul Lewis	20,851	19.8	▼4.2
Total votes		105,105	100.0	

New Jersey general election, 1973
Party	Candidate	Votes	%
Republican	C. Gus Rys	29,386	26.2
Republican	John A. Spizziri	28,156	25.1
Democratic	Paul S. Konstadt	27,793	24.8
Democratic	Vincent A. Girardy	26,957	24.0
Total votes		112,292	100.0
