= Kevin J. O'Toole =

American politician (born 1964)

Kevin O'Toole

Chair of the Port Authority of New York and New Jersey
- Incumbent
- Assumed office August 3, 2017
- Preceded by: John J. Degnan

Commissioner of the Port Authority of New York and New Jersey
- Incumbent
- Assumed office July 2, 2017
- Preceded by: Pat Schuber

Member of the New Jersey Senate
- In office January 8, 2008 – July 1, 2017
- Preceded by: Henry McNamara
- Succeeded by: Kristin Corrado
- Constituency: 40th district
- In office May 5, 2001 – January 8, 2002
- Preceded by: C. Louis Bassano
- Succeeded by: Richard Bagger
- Constituency: 21st district

Member of the New Jersey General Assembly
- In office January 8, 2002 – January 8, 2008
- Preceded by: Nicholas Felice
- Succeeded by: Scott Rumana
- Constituency: 40th district
- In office January 9, 1996 – May 5, 2001
- Preceded by: Maureen Ogden
- Succeeded by: Eric Munoz
- Constituency: 21st district

Personal details
- Born: October 5, 1964 (age 61) Cedar Grove, New Jersey, U.S.
- Party: Republican
- Spouse: Bethany O'Toole
- Children: 2
- Education: Seton Hall University (BA, JD)

Kevin J. O'Toole (born October 5, 1964) is an American Republican Party politician, who served in the New Jersey Senate. O'Toole represented the 40th legislative district, which included parts of Bergen, Essex, Morris, and Passaic counties from 2008 to 2017.

O'Toole was elected to the Assembly in 1995 and re-elected five times. He served in the Senate from May 2001 to January 2002, and was elected to the Senate again on November 6, 2007. O'Toole serves in the Senate on the Budget and Appropriations Committee and on the Senate Judiciary Government Committee. He also served as the Senate Minority Whip.

In January 2016, O'Toole announced that he would not seek re-election in 2017. In February 2017, Governor Chris Christie nominated him to a six-year term on the Board of Commissioners of the Port Authority of New York and New Jersey to succeed Pat Schuber. The State Senate confirmed his nomination in March 2017, though O'Toole indicated that it would take a few months to wrap up his time in the Senate before he took office as a commissioner.

O'Toole resigned from the State Senate on July 1, 2017, to begin his term as Port Authority commissioner. The following month, he was selected as the chairman of the agency's Board of Directors by his fellow commissioners, succeeding John J. Degnan, who had served in that position since July 2014.

== Early life and career ==
O'Toole was born in Cedar Grove, New Jersey to an Irish American father and Korean mother who met during the Korean War. He graduated from Cedar Grove High School and earned a B.A. in Political Science / Public Administration and a J.D. in 1989 from Seton Hall University. He later passed the bar exam in 1989 and served a clerkship in the office of the State Attorney General.

At the age of 25, O'Toole began his political career by serving on the Cedar Grove Township Council from 1989 to 1996. He was elected as its Mayor from 1990 to 1991, 1993 to 1994 and from 1995 to 1996. O'Toole was later elected as Chairman of the Essex County Republican Committee from 1997 to 2011. He replaced incumbent Chair Jeanne Parke.

In 1995, O'Toole was elected to the General Assembly, the lower house of the New Jersey State Legislature, representing the 21st Legislative District. He was appointed as the Assembly's Deputy Republican Leader from 2004 to 2008 and was the Assistant Majority Leader from 1998 to 2001. O'Toole was briefly appointed to the State Senate in 2001, where he served for eight months before redistricting forced him into a different legislative district.

In 2007, O'Toole defeated Democrat John Zunic to win election to the New Jersey Senate seat in the 40th District, filling the seat vacated by Henry McNamara, a fellow Republican who had represented the district since 1985. O'Toole's running mates David C. Russo and Scott Rumana also won election.

After his brother's death in 2011, O'Toole retired from his position as Chairman of the Essex County Republican Committee and recommended that County Party Executive Director Al Barlas from Bloomfield succeed him. Barlas serves as O'Toole's Chief of Staff.

By profession, O'Toole is an attorney with the firm of O'Toole Fernandez Weiner Vanlieu LLC. Senator O'Toole and his wife, Bethany, have two children, Kevin Jr. and Ryan Marie.

== State legislator ==
O'Toole has sponsored laws to reform welfare, strengthen domestic violence statutes, increase penalties on businesses and individuals who engage in discrimination, mandate insurance coverage for mammography and for treatment of breast and cervical cancer, preserve the state's drinking water supply through the preservation of Sterling Forest, and create more government transparency. In the state legislature, O'Toole has been a proponent of ethics reform in New Jersey government. He was the original sponsor of legislation creating pension reform in New Jersey. He has sponsored legislation to streamline government, promote education, protect the environment, and lower property taxes. O'Toole was one of the primary sponsors of pre-paid college education expense program (529 college savings plan) and legislation that would prohibit campaign contributions from vendors who have government contracts.

In 2013, O'Toole challenged Thomas Kean Jr. for the leadership of Republicans in the Senate. O'Toole was backed by Governor Chris Christie, reportedly because of disagreements with Kean in regards to strategy during the elections that year, where no gains occurred during the Senate elections despite Christie winning re-election with over 60% of the vote. Kean held on to his position of Senate Minority Leader in a 10–6 caucus vote. In the following session, Kean removed O'Toole from his position as Minority Whip.

== Election history ==
=== 40th District ===
New Jersey general election, 2013
Party	Candidate	Votes	%	±%
Republican	Kevin J. O'Toole	37,565	65.9	▲3.5
Democratic	William Meredith Ashley	19,401	34.1	▼3.5
Total votes		56,966	100.0	

2011 New Jersey general election
Party	Candidate	Votes	%
Republican	Kevin J. O'Toole	22,821	62.4
Democratic	John Zunic	13,733	37.6
Total votes		36,554	100.0

2007 New Jersey general election
Party	Candidate	Votes	%	±%
Republican	Kevin J. O'Toole	26,214	66.2	▲1.7
Democratic	John Zunic	13,395	33.8	▼1.7
Total votes		39,609	100.0	

New Jersey general election, 2005
Party	Candidate	Votes	%	±%
Republican	Kevin J. O'Toole	36,957	30.6	▼1.5
Republican	David C. Russo	36,820	30.5	▼1.8
Democratic	Jane Bidwell	24,117	20.0	▲3.1
Democratic	Ronald Beattie	22,732	18.8	▲1.8
Total votes		120,626	100.0	

New Jersey general election, 2003
Party	Candidate	Votes	%	±%
Republican	David C. Russo	23,965	32.3	▲1.6
Republican	Kevin J. O'Toole	23,865	32.1	▲1.9
Democratic	Michael Bradley	12,624	17.0	▼2.9
Democratic	Jane Bidwell Gaunt	12,535	16.9	▼2.3
Green	Philip A. Passantino	1,256	1.7	N/A
Total votes		74,245	100.0	

New Jersey general election, 2001
Party	Candidate	Votes	%
Republican	David C. Russo	38,627	30.7
Republican	Kevin J. O'Toole	38,058	30.2
Democratic	Frank Delvecchio	25,027	19.9
Democratic	Donna Kurdock	24,201	19.2
Total votes		125,913	100.0

=== 21st District ===
New Jersey general election, 1999
Party	Candidate	Votes	%	±%
Republican	Kevin J. O'Toole	17,541	28.9	▼2.4
Republican	Joel M. Weingarten	17,107	28.2	▼2.9
Democratic	Michael P. Cohan	12,836	21.2	▲2.9
Democratic	Dennis M. Caufield	12,657	20.9	▲3.3
Unbossed	Robert Diamond	533	0.9	N/A
Total votes		60,674	100.0	

New Jersey general election, 1997
Party	Candidate	Votes	%	±%
Republican	Kevin O’Toole	38,169	31.3	▲2.7
Republican	Joel M. Weingarten	37,915	31.1	▲2.5
Democratic	John M. Mazziotti	22,292	18.3	▼3.4
Democratic	John C. Shaw	21,511	17.6	▼2.0
Conservative	Alfonso J. Adinolfi	1,207	1.0	N/A
Conservative	Thomas J. Mooney	883	0.7	N/A
Total votes		121,977	100.0	

New Jersey general election, 1995
Party	Candidate	Votes	%	±%
Republican	Kevin J. O'Toole	20,765	28.6	▼3.8
Republican	Monroe Jay Lustbader	20,713	28.6	▼2.7
Democratic	Kay Slattery	15,761	21.7	▲3.5
Democratic	Roy Allan Hirschfeld	14,208	19.6	▲1.5
Clean Government	Franklin C. Marmo	1,066	1.5	N/A
Total votes		72,513	100.0	

New Jersey General Assembly
Preceded by Maureen Ogden	Member of the New Jersey General Assembly from the 21st district January 9, 1996–May 5, 2001; Served alongside: Monroe Jay Lustbader, Joel Weingarten	Succeeded by Eric Munoz
Preceded by Nicholas Felice	Member of the New Jersey General Assembly from the 40th district January 8, 2002–January 8, 2008; Served alongside: David C. Russo	Succeeded by Scott Rumana
New Jersey Senate
Preceded by C. Louis Bassano	Member of the New Jersey Senate from the 21st district May 5, 2001–January 8, 2002	Succeeded by Richard Bagger
Preceded by Henry McNamara	Member of the New Jersey Senate from the 40th district January 8, 2008–July 1, 2017	Succeeded by Kristin Corrado
Political offices
Preceded by Pat Schuber	Commissioner of the Port Authority of New York and New Jersey; July 2, 2017–present	Incumbent
Preceded by John J. Degnan	Chairman of the Port Authority of New York and New Jersey; August 3, 2017–present	Incumbent
