= David C. Russo =

American politician (born 1953)

Member of the New Jersey General Assembly from the 40th district
- In office January 9, 1990 – January 9, 2018
- Preceded by: Walter Kern
- Succeeded by: Christopher DePhillips

Personal details
- Born: October 8, 1953 (age 73) Jersey City, New Jersey, U.S.
- Party: Republican
- Spouse: Rosemarie Adamiak
- Children: 2
- Education: College of William and Mary (BA); Seton Hall University (JD)
- Occupation: Attorney
- Website: Legislative webpage

David C. Russo (born October 8, 1953) is an American attorney and Republican Party politician, who represented the 40th legislative district in the New Jersey General Assembly from 1990 to 2017.

== Biography ==
Born in Jersey City, and raised in Closter, New Jersey, Russo attended Bergen Catholic High School. He graduated with a B.A. from the College of William and Mary in history in 1975 and received a J.D. from Seton Hall University School of Law in 1978.

Russo served as Attorney for the Borough of Bergenfield from 2002-2005 and served as attorney for Bergenfield's Zoning Board of Adjustment from 1988-1989. He was the Municipal Prosecutor for the Township of Wyckoff from 1987-1988 and served as an attorney for the Bergen County Office on Aging from 1986-1987.

Having been admitted to the bar in 1979, he is a partner at the Teaneck law firm of Russo and Russo. He resides in Ridgewood with wife Rosemarie (née Adamiak) with whom he has two children.

== Political career ==
Russo began his elected career in 1989 when he defeated long-time assemblyman Walter Kern in the June Republican primary, though Kern had been disbarred after a scandal was exposed. He had since been easily re-elected every two years to the Assembly. As of 2017, he was the longest-serving current member of the General Assembly, though not the earliest-serving member (Ralph R. Caputo served non-consecutive terms in the Assembly in the 1960s and 1970s). He served in the Assembly on the Homeland Security and State Preparedness Committee.

Russo ran for the Republican congressional nomination in New Jersey's 5th congressional district in 2002, looking to replace the retiring Marge Roukema. Running primarily against 39th District Senator Gerald Cardinale of Demarest, who was endorsed by Roukema, and 24th District Assemblyman Scott Garrett of Wantage Township, who had made two unsuccessful attempts to unseat Roukema in the previous two primaries, Russo finished with 26% of the vote. While this was enough to defeat Senator Cardinale, who polled 25%, it was twenty points short of Assemblyman Garrett's total and left Russo in second place; Garrett would win election to the seat and be elected to six additional terms before being defeated in the 2016 election.

After 28 years in office, Russo chose not to run for re-election in 2017 and was succeeded by fellow Republican Christopher DePhillips.

New Jersey General Assembly
| Preceded by Walter Kern | Member of the New Jersey General Assembly for the 40th District; January 9, 1990 – January 9, 2018; With: Nicholas Felice, Kevin J. O'Toole, Scott Rumana, Kevin J. Rooney | Succeeded by Christopher DePhillips |
