= Scott Rumana =

American politician

Scott T. Rumana

Member of the New Jersey General Assembly from the 40th district
- In office January 8, 2008 – October 20, 2016 Serving with David C. Russo
- Preceded by: Kevin J. O'Toole
- Succeeded by: Kevin J. Rooney

Mayor of Wayne, New Jersey
- In office January 1, 2002 – December 29, 2007
- Preceded by: Judy Orson
- Succeeded by: Christopher P. Vergano

Member of the Passaic County Board of Chosen Freeholders
- In office December 19, 1996 – December 31, 2000
- Preceded by: John C. Morley III
- Succeeded by: Sonia Rosado

Personal details
- Born: Scott Thomas Rumana; July 18, 1964 (age 62)
- Party: Republican
- Spouse: Laura Joyce (m. 2006)
- Children: one
- Education: Hartwick College (BA); New York Law School (JD)
- Occupation: Attorney
- Website: Legislative webpage

Scott T. Rumana (born July 18, 1964) is an Assyrian-American Republican Party politician, and was a member of the New Jersey General Assembly, where he represented the 40th legislative district from January 8, 2008, until his resignation on October 20, 2016. On October 20, 2016, he was confirmed by the New Jersey Senate as a judge of the New Jersey Superior Court for Passaic County. He has also served as the mayor and as a councilman in Wayne and is a former member of the Passaic County Board of Chosen Freeholders.

== Biography ==
Rumana is the descendant of an Assyrian tailor from Paterson. He was raised in Wayne where his interest in public service was sparked by his godfather Robert A. Roe, for whom Rumana later served as an intern while Roe was in Congress.

Rumana was awarded a B.A. from Hartwick College with a major in management in 1987, and earned a J.D. from New York Law School in June 1991. He is an attorney with the firm of Hunziker, Jones and Sweeney. A resident of Wayne, he is married to Laura and has one son.

== Early political career ==
Rumana served on the Wayne Township Council from 1994 to 1996. He served until his appointment to the Passaic County Board of Chosen Freeholders.

In December 1996, Rumana was appointed to the Freeholder Board to replace Republican John C. Morley III, who resigned due to a conflict with him running the county's garbage collection agency. At the time of his appointment, the Republican Party had a majority of the seats on the Passaic County Freeholder Board. In his first bid for a full three-year term, Rumana finished in the top three in the 1997 election, joining Democratic newcomers Jim Gallagher and Lois A. Cuccinello; however, the majority control of the board shifted to the Democrats in this election. Due to the fall from grace of former Passaic County Chairman Peter Murphy and the resulting "corruption costs you money" campaign of the Democrats, Rumana finished fourth behind incumbents Gallagher and Cuccinello and newcomer Sonia Rosado in the 2000 election, losing his seat whilst filing a lawsuit against his opponents for allegedly tying Rumana to another county official under investigation.

Rumana launched a successful comeback the next year defeating incumbent Wayne mayor Judy Orson in the June Republican primary then defeating Chris McIntyre in the general election. He was re-elected to the position in 2005 and in 2006 was elected to head the Passaic County Republican Committee, a position he held until 2012. Under Rumana's leadership as Passaic County Republican Chairman, the Democratic 7-0 hold on the freeholder board of the past decade was broken. Michael Marotta, Deborah Ciambrone and Ed O'Connell were elected to the Board of Chosen Freeholders and Kristen Corrado was also elected County Clerk during his tenure.

== Assembly career ==
In 2007 upon the selection of Assemblyman Kevin J. O'Toole to run for a State Senate seat, Rumana was elected in the primary election along with incumbent David C. Russo to be the Republican candidates in the general election for the General Assembly in the 40th District. He was re-elected to two-year terms with Russo thereafter.

Rumana served in the Assembly on the Environment and Solid Waste Committee, the Transportation and Independent Authorities Committee, and the Legislative Services Commission. He previously served as the Assistant Republican Leader from 2008 to 2009 and the Deputy Conference Leader/Policy Co-chair in 2010 to 2011. Since 2012, he has been the Republican Whip in the Assembly.

As a legislator, Rumana advanced opposition to Council on Affordable Housing mandates and the advancement of clean energy initiatives. Scott Rumana voted against a bill legalizing same sex marriage in 2012 and voted against the override of Governor Chris Christie's veto of the bill in 2013.

In 2011, a former opponent in an Assembly election filed state ethics complaints against Rumana alleging that Rumana's appearance at a Board of Public Utilities advocating for a not-for-profit energy company grant was in conflict with his position as a state legislator. Though the Joint Legislation Committee on Ethics dismissed the charges in September 2011, a Superior Court judge overturned the dismissal in February 2012 claiming that the vote to dismiss was per the committee's bylaws. A state appellate court reinstated the dismissal of charges in 2013.

=== District 40 ===
Each of the forty districts in the New Jersey Legislature has one representative in the New Jersey Senate and two members in the New Jersey General Assembly. The other representatives from the 40th District for the 2016–2017 Legislative Session are:

- Senator Kevin J. O'Toole
- Assemblyman David C. Russo

New Jersey General Assembly
Preceded by Kevin J. O'Toole	Member of the New Jersey General Assembly for the 40th District; January 8, 2008 – present With: David C. Russo	Succeeded by Kevin J. Rooney
Political offices
Preceded by Judy Orson	Mayor of Wayne, New Jersey; January 1, 2002 – December 29, 2007	Succeeded by Christopher P. Vergano
Preceded by John C. Morley III	Passaic County at-large Freeholder; December 19, 1996 – December 31, 2000	Succeeded by Sonia Rosado
