= 2021 New Jersey Senate election =

2021 New Jersey State Senate election
- November 2, 2021

All 40 seats in the New Jersey Senate 21 seats needed for a majority
- Turnout: 40% (▲1pp)
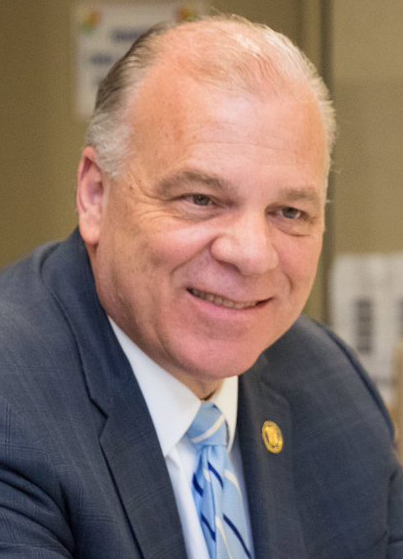

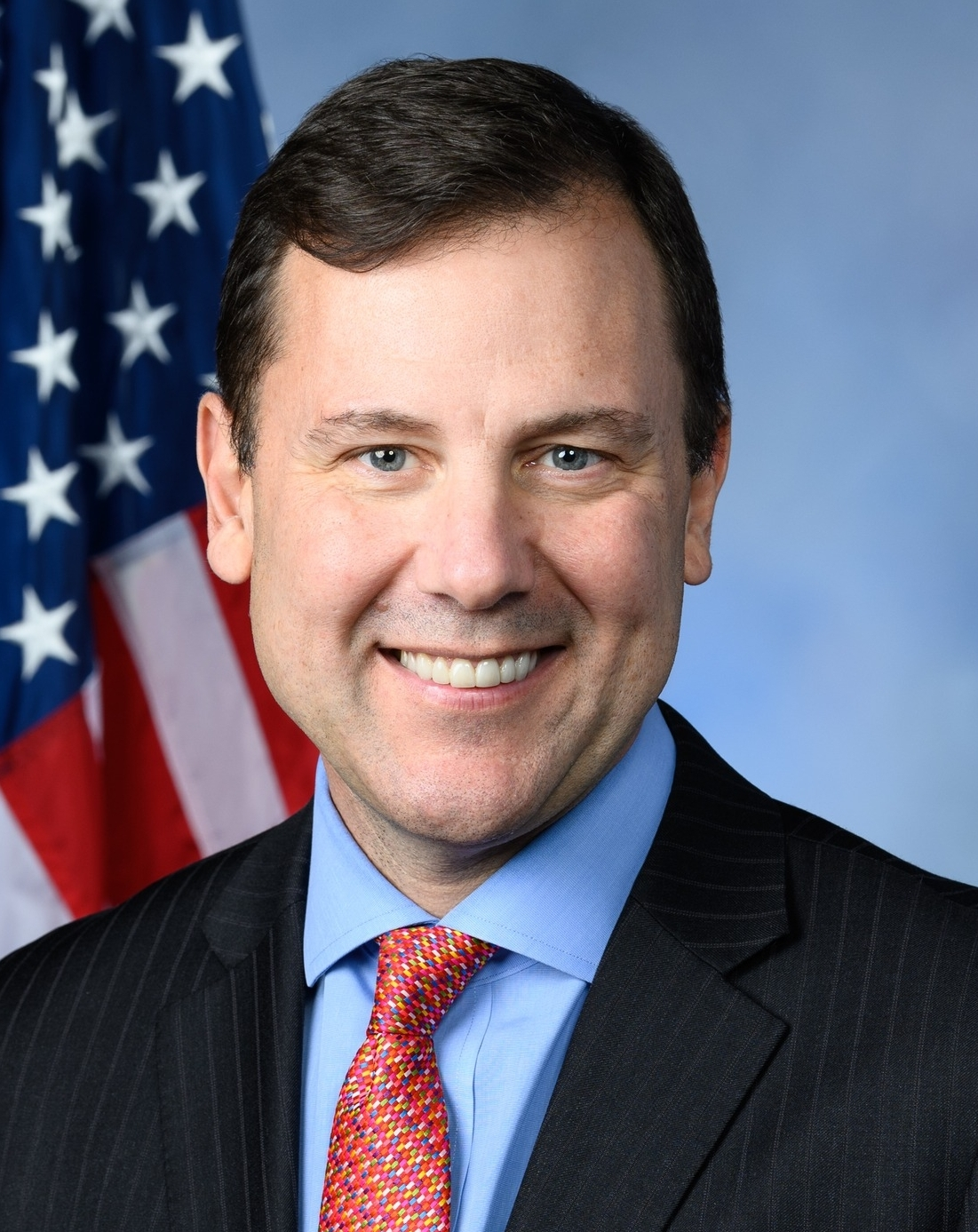
	Majority party	Minority party
Leader	Steve Sweeney (lost re-election)	Thomas Kean Jr. (retired)
Party	Democratic	Republican
Leader since	January 12, 2010	January 8, 2008
Leader's seat	3rd (West Deptford)	21st (Westfield)
Last election	25 seats	15 seats
Seats before	25	14
Seats won	24	16
Seat change	▼1	▲2
Popular vote	1,296,465	1,199,006
Percentage	51.9%	48.0%
Swing	▼7.2%	▲7.3%
- Republican gain Republican hold Democratic gain Democratic hold
Senate President before election
Steve Sweeney
Democratic
Elected Senate President
Nicholas Scutari
Democratic

The 2021 New Jersey State Senate election was held on November 2, 2021. New Jersey voters elected state senators in all of the state's legislative districts for a two-year term to the New Jersey Senate. Republicans flipped the 3rd and 8th districts, and Democrats flipped the 16th. This was the first election since 1991 where Republicans posted a net gain of state Senate seats. Democrats would later be restored to 25 seats following the party switch of Samuel D. Thompson in 2023.

== Incumbents not running for re-election ==
=== Democratic ===
- Loretta Weinberg, District 37

=== Republican ===
- Kip Bateman, District 16
- Thomas Kean Jr., District 21 (running for NJ-07 in 2022)

In addition, five members who were elected in the last election in 2017 have since left office: Robert M. Gordon (D-38th, resigned), Jeff Van Drew (D-1st, resigned), Anthony R. Bucco (R-25th, died in office), Gerald Cardinale (R-39th, died in office), and Chris A. Brown, (R-2nd, resigned after previously announcing retirement).

== Predictions ==
Source	Ranking	As of
New Jersey Globe	Safe D	October 28, 2021
Elections Daily	Safe D	November 1, 2021

== Results ==
=== Overview ===
Parties	Candidates	Seats				Popular vote		
Parties	Candidates	2017	2021	+/-	Strength	Vote	%	Change
Democratic	40	25	24	▼1	60%	1,296,465	51.9%	▼7.2
Republican	38	15	16	▲1	40%	1,199,006	48.0%	▲7.3
Libertarian	1	0	0	0	0%	403	0.02%	▼0.01
Independent	2	0	0	0	0%	1,460	0.1%	0.0
Total	81	40	40		100.00%	2,497,334	100.00%	
Turnout								
Registered								

=== By State Senate District ===
Senate District	2020 Pres.	Incumbent	Party	Elected Senator	Party
District 1	R +7	Mike Testa (Note: Testa won a 2019 special election to complete the unexpired term of Senator Jeff Van Drew, who resigned to take his seat in the United States House of Representatives)	Rep	Mike Testa	Rep
District 2	D+10.72	Vacant (Note: Senator Chris A. Brown, who had already announced he would not stand for re-election, resigned on July 21 to join the New Jersey Department of Community Affairs. Vince Polistina, the Republican nominee for the seat in the general election, won an August 4 special county convention to succeed Brown. The Senate did not convene until after Election Day. Although Polistina's election was certified by Secretary of State Tahesha Way, and he was administered the oath of office by a retired Superior Court judge, Senate President Stephen M. Sweeney refused to swear him in as Senator, and the non-partisan Office of Legislative Services did not consider Polistina the incumbent.)		Vincent J. Polistina	Rep
District 3	R+1.56	Stephen M. Sweeney	Dem	Edward Durr	Rep
District 4	D+14.63	Fred H. Madden	Dem	Fred H. Madden	Dem
District 5	D+25.92	Nilsa Cruz-Perez	Dem	Nilsa Cruz-Perez	Dem
District 6	D+35.95	James Beach	Dem	James Beach	Dem
District 7	D+31.46	Troy Singleton	Dem	Troy Singleton	Dem
District 8	D+6.84	Dawn Addiego	Dem (Note: Addiego switched from the Republican Party to the Democratic Party in January 2019.)	Jean Stanfield	Rep
District 9	R+22.36	Christopher J. Connors	Rep	Christopher J. Connors	Rep
District 10	R+22.45	James W. Holzapfel	Rep	James W. Holzapfel	Rep
District 11	D+11.75	Vin Gopal	Dem	Vin Gopal	Dem
District 12	R+13.49	Samuel D. Thompson	Rep	Samuel D. Thompson	Rep
District 13	R+5.59	Declan O'Scanlon	Rep	Declan O'Scanlon	Rep
District 14	D+17.14	Linda R. Greenstein	Dem	Linda R. Greenstein	Dem
District 15	D+51.42	Shirley Turner	Dem	Shirley Turner	Dem
District 16	D+21.84	Kip Bateman	Rep	Andrew Zwicker	Dem
District 17	D+44.07	Bob Smith	Dem	Bob Smith	Dem
District 18	D+22.59	Patrick J. Diegnan	Dem	Patrick J. Diegnan	Dem
District 19	D+19.05	Joe F. Vitale	Dem	Joe F. Vitale	Dem
District 20	D+48.19	Joseph Cryan	Dem	Joseph Cryan	Dem
District 21	D+18.36	Thomas Kean Jr.	Rep	Jon Bramnick	Rep
District 22	D+34.29	Nicholas Scutari	Dem	Nicholas Scutari	Dem
District 23	R+2.65	Michael J. Doherty	Rep	Michael J. Doherty	Rep
District 24	R+17.41	Steve Oroho	Rep	Steve Oroho	Rep
District 25	D+9.25	Anthony M. Bucco	Rep	Anthony M. Bucco	Rep
District 26	R+2.25	Joseph Pennacchio	Rep	Joseph Pennacchio	Rep
District 27	D+34.75	Richard Codey	Dem	Richard Codey	Dem
District 28	D+58.93	Ronald Rice	Dem	Ronald Rice	Dem
District 29	D+58.53	Teresa Ruiz	Dem	Teresa Ruiz	Dem
District 30	R+30.04	Robert W. Singer	Rep	Robert W. Singer	Rep
District 31	D+51.83	Sandra Bolden Cunningham	Dem	Sandra Bolden Cunningham	Dem
District 32	D+31.37	Nicholas Sacco	Dem	Nicholas Sacco	Dem
District 33	D+52.89	Brian P. Stack	Dem	Brian P. Stack	Dem
District 34	D+58.59	Nia Gill	Dem	Nia Gill	Dem
District 35	D+40.89	Nellie Pou	Dem	Nellie Pou	Dem
District 36	D+12.89	Paul Sarlo	Dem	Paul Sarlo	Dem
District 37	D+38.18	Loretta Weinberg	Dem	Gordon M. Johnson	Dem
District 38	D+13.38	Joseph Lagana	Dem	Joseph Lagana	Dem
District 39	D+4.6	Holly Schepisi	Rep	Holly Schepisi	Rep
District 40	R+0.03	Kristin Corrado	Rep	Kristin Corrado	Rep

=== Close races ===
Seats where the margin of victory was under 10%:

1. District 8, 2.22% gain
2. District 3, 3.36% gain
3. District 2, 3.74%
4. District 11, 3.76%
5. District 38, 5.80%
6. District 16, 6.64% gain
7. District 21, 7.30%
8. District 4, 8.84%

== District 1 ==
=== Republican primary ===
Republican primary
Party	Candidate	Votes	%
Republican	Michael Testa (incumbent)	13,845	100.0%
Total votes		13,845	100.0%

=== Democratic primary ===
Democratic primary
Party	Candidate	Votes	%
Democratic	Yolanda E. Garcia Balicki	9,157	100.0%
Total votes		9,157	100.0%

=== General election ===
Polling

Poll source	Date(s) administered	Sample size	Margin of error	Mike Testa (R)	Yolanda Garcia Balicki (D)	Undecided
Stockton University	September 28 – October 10, 2021	407 (RV)	± 4.8%	49%	36%	9%

Predictions

Source	Ranking	As of
New Jersey Globe	Likely R	October 28, 2021
Elections Daily	Safe R	November 1, 2021

Results

1st Legislative District general election, 2021
Party	Candidate	Votes	%
Republican	Michael Testa (incumbent)	42,438	64.59
Democratic	Yolanda E. Garcia Balicki	23,269	35.41
Total votes		65,707	100.0
Republican hold			

== District 2 ==
=== Republican primary ===
Polling

Poll source	Date(s) administered	Sample size	Margin of error	Seth Grossman	Vince Polistina
Neighborhood Research (R) (Note: Internal poll for the Seth Grossman campaign)	?	? (LV)	± 5.9%	22%	17%

Republican primary
Party	Candidate	Votes	%
Republican	Vince Polistina	7,479	69.5%
Republican	Seth Grossman	3,277	30.5%
Total votes		10,756	100.0%

=== Democratic primary ===
Democratic primary
Party	Candidate	Votes	%
Democratic	Vince Mazzeo	9,408	100.0%
Total votes		9,408	100.0%

=== General election ===
Polling

Poll source	Date(s) administered	Sample size	Margin of error	Vince Polistina (R)	Vince Mazzeo (D)	Undecided
Stockton University	October 9–24, 2021	401 (LV)	± 4.9%	41%	48%	6%

Predictions

Source	Ranking	As of
New Jersey Globe	Tossup	October 28, 2021
Elections Daily	Lean D (flip)	November 1, 2021

Debate

2021 New Jersey's 2nd Senate district debate
No.	Date	Host	Moderator	Link	Republican	Democratic
Key: P Participant A Absent N Not invited I Invited W Withdrawn						
Key: P Participant A Absent N Not invited I Invited W Withdrawn					Vince Polistina	Vince Mazzeo
1	Oct. 6, 2021	The Press of Atlantic City; Stockton University at Atlantic City	John Froonjian		P	P
2	Oct. 17, 2021	New Jersey Globe	Micah Rasmussen; David Wildstein		P	P

Results

2nd Legislative District general election, 2021
Party	Candidate	Votes	%
Republican	Vince Polistina	31,488	51.87
Democratic	Vince Mazzeo	29,213	48.13
Total votes		60,701	100.0
Republican hold			

== District 3 ==
=== Democratic primary ===
Democratic primary
Party	Candidate	Votes	%
Democratic	Steve Sweeney (incumbent)	8,595	100.0%
Total votes		8,595	100.0%

=== Republican primary ===
Republican primary
Party	Candidate	Votes	%
Republican	Edward Durr	8,393	100.0%
Total votes		8,393	100.0%

=== General election ===
Predictions

Source	Ranking	As of
New Jersey Globe	Likely D	October 28, 2021
Elections Daily	Likely D	November 1, 2021

Results

3rd Legislative District general election, 2021
Party	Candidate	Votes	%
Republican	Edward Durr	33,761	51.68
Democratic	Steve Sweeney (incumbent)	31,562	48.32
Total votes		65,323	100.0
Republican gain from Democratic			

== District 4 ==
=== Democratic primary ===
Democratic primary
Party	Candidate	Votes	%
Democratic	Fred H. Madden (incumbent)	12,428	100.0%
Total votes		12,428	100.0%

=== Republican primary ===
Republican primary
Party	Candidate	Votes	%
Republican	Stephen H. Pakradooni Jr.	6,981	100.0%
Total votes		6,981	100.0%

=== General election ===
Predictions

Source	Ranking	As of
New Jersey Globe	Solid D	October 28, 2021
Elections Daily	Safe D	November 1, 2021

Results

4th Legislative District general election, 2021
Party	Candidate	Votes	%
Democratic	Fred H. Madden (incumbent)	38,062	54.42
Republican	Stephen H. Pakradooni Jr.	31,878	45.58
Total votes		69,940	100.0
Democratic hold			

== District 5 ==
=== Democratic primary ===
Democratic primary
Party	Candidate	Votes	%
Democratic	Nilsa Cruz-Perez (incumbent)	12,719	100.0%
Total votes		12,719	100.0%

=== Republican primary ===
No Republicans filed. However, Clyde Cook received enough write-in votes to qualify for the general election.

Republican primary
Party	Candidate	Votes	%
Republican	Clyde Cook (write-in)	158	55.6
Republican	Other write-ins	126	44.4
Total votes		284	100.0

=== General election ===
Predictions

Source	Ranking	As of
New Jersey Globe	Solid D	October 28, 2021
Elections Daily	Safe D	November 1, 2021

Results

5th Legislative District general election, 2021
Party	Candidate	Votes	%
Democratic	Nilsa Cruz-Perez (incumbent)	31,246	57.70
Republican	Clyde Cook	22,903	42.30
Total votes		54,149	100.0
Democratic hold			

== District 6 ==
=== Democratic primary ===
Democratic primary
Party	Candidate	Votes	%
Democratic	James Beach (incumbent)	17,758	100.0%
Total votes		17,758	100.0%

=== Republican primary ===
Republican primary
Party	Candidate	Votes	%
Republican	John Foley	6,113	100.0%
Total votes		6,113	100.0%

=== General election ===
Predictions

Source	Ranking	As of
New Jersey Globe	Solid D	October 28, 2021
Elections Daily	Safe D	November 1, 2021

Results

6th Legislative District general election, 2021
Party	Candidate	Votes	%
Democratic	James Beach (incumbent)	48,508	64.85
Republican	John Foley	26,292	35.15
Total votes		74,800	100.0
Democratic hold			

== District 7 ==
=== Democratic primary ===
Democratic primary
Party	Candidate	Votes	%
Democratic	Troy Singleton (incumbent)	14,694	100.0%
Total votes		14,694	100.0%

=== Republican primary ===
Republican primary
Party	Candidate	Votes	%
Republican	Michelle Arnold	6,571	100.0%
Total votes		6,571	100.0%

=== General election ===
Predictions

Source	Ranking	As of
New Jersey Globe	Solid D	October 28, 2021
Elections Daily	Safe D	November 1, 2021

Results

7th Legislative District general election, 2021
Party	Candidate	Votes	%
Democratic	Troy Singleton (incumbent)	46,619	62.29
Republican	Michelle Arnold	28,226	37.71
Total votes		74,845	100.0
Democratic hold			

== District 8 ==
=== Democratic primary ===
Democratic primary
Party	Candidate	Votes	%
Democratic	Dawn Marie Addiego (incumbent)	9,759	100.0%
Total votes		9,759	100.0%

=== Republican primary ===
Republican primary
Party	Candidate	Votes	%
Republican	Jean Stanfield	10,149	100.0%
Total votes		10,149	100.0%

=== General election ===
Predictions

Source	Ranking	As of
New Jersey Globe	Tossup	October 28, 2021
Elections Daily	Lean R (flip)	November 1, 2021

Debate

2021 New Jersey's 8th Senate district debate
No.	Date	Host	Moderator	Link	Democratic	Republican
Key: P Participant A Absent N Not invited I Invited W Withdrawn						
Key: P Participant A Absent N Not invited I Invited W Withdrawn					Dawn Marie Addiego	Jean Stanfield
1	Oct. 24, 2021	New Jersey Globe	Micah Rasmussen; David Wildstein		P	P

Results

8th Legislative District general election, 2021
Party	Candidate	Votes	%
Republican	Jean Stanfield	39,648	51.11
Democratic	Dawn Marie Addiego (incumbent)	37,927	48.89
Total votes		77,575	100.0
Republican gain from Democratic			

== District 9 ==
=== Republican primary ===
Republican primary
Party	Candidate	Votes	%
Republican	Christopher J. Connors (incumbent)	17,194	100.0%
Total votes		17,194	100.0%

=== Democratic primary ===
Democratic primary
Party	Candidate	Votes	%
Democratic	David T. Wright	7,000	100.0%
Total votes		7,000	100.0%

=== General election ===
Predictions

Source	Ranking	As of
New Jersey Globe	Solid R	October 28, 2021
Elections Daily	Safe R	November 1, 2021

Results

9th Legislative District general election, 2021
Party	Candidate	Votes	%
Republican	Christopher J. Connors (incumbent)	62,401	69.40
Democratic	David T. Wright	26,818	29.82
Unaffiliated Best Choice	Regina Discenza	701	0.78
Total votes		89,920	100.0
Republican hold			

== District 10 ==
=== Republican primary ===
Republican primary
Party	Candidate	Votes	%
Republican	Jim Holzapfel (incumbent)	15,285	100.0%
Total votes		15,285	100.0%

=== Democratic primary ===
Democratic primary
Party	Candidate	Votes	%
Democratic	Emma Mammano	6,164	100.0%
Total votes		6,164	100.0%

=== General election ===
Predictions

Source	Ranking	As of
New Jersey Globe	Solid R	October 28, 2021
Elections Daily	Safe R	November 1, 2021

Results

10th Legislative District general election, 2021
Party	Candidate	Votes	%
Republican	Jim Holzapfel (incumbent)	57,021	68.99
Democratic	Emma Mammano	25,635	31.01
Total votes		82,656	100.0
Republican hold			

== District 11 ==
=== Democratic primary ===
Democratic primary
Party	Candidate	Votes	%
Democratic	Vin Gopal (incumbent)	8,011	100.0%
Total votes		8,011	100.0%

==== Endorsements ====
Vin Gopal

Organizations

- New Jersey League of Conservation Voters

=== Republican primary ===
Republican primary
Party	Candidate	Votes	%
Republican	Lori L. Annetta	7,206	100.0%
Total votes		7,206	100.0%

=== General election ===
Predictions

Source	Ranking	As of
New Jersey Globe	Likely D	October 28, 2021
Elections Daily	Likely D	November 1, 2021

Results

11th Legislative District general election, 2021
Party	Candidate	Votes	%
Democratic	Vin Gopal (incumbent)	36,978	51.88
Republican	Lori L. Annetta	34,296	48.12
Total votes		71,274	100.0
Democratic hold			

== District 12 ==
=== Republican primary ===
Republican primary
Party	Candidate	Votes	%
Republican	Samuel D. Thompson (incumbent)	9,563	100.0%
Total votes		9,563	100.0%

=== Democratic primary ===
Democratic primary
Party	Candidate	Votes	%
Democratic	Joseph Altomonte	5,410	100.0%
Total votes		5,410	100.0%

=== General election ===
Predictions

Source	Ranking	As of
New Jersey Globe	Solid R	October 28, 2021
Elections Daily	Safe R	November 1, 2021

Results

12th Legislative District general election, 2021
Party	Candidate	Votes	%
Republican	Samuel D. Thompson (incumbent)	46,897	64.94
Democratic	Joseph Altomonte	25,321	35.06
Total votes		72,218	100.0
Republican hold			

== District 13 ==
=== Republican primary ===
Republican primary
Party	Candidate	Votes	%
Republican	Declan O'Scanlon (incumbent)	11,058	100.0%
Total votes		11,058	100.0%

=== Democratic primary ===
Democratic primary
Party	Candidate	Votes	%
Democratic	Vincent Solomeno III	6,116	100.0%
Total votes		6,116	100.0%

=== General election ===
Predictions

Source	Ranking	As of
New Jersey Globe	Solid R	October 28, 2021
Elections Daily	Safe R	November 1, 2021

Results

13th Legislative District general election, 2021
Party	Candidate	Votes	%
Republican	Declan O'Scanlon (incumbent)	53,599	61.45
Democratic	Vincent Solomeno III	33,627	38.55
Total votes		87,226	100.0
Republican hold			

== District 14 ==
=== Democratic primary ===
Democratic primary
Party	Candidate	Votes	%
Democratic	Linda R. Greenstein (incumbent)	10,609	100.0%
Total votes		10,609	100.0%

==== Endorsements ====
Linda R. Greenstein

Organizations

- New Jersey League of Conservation Voters

=== Republican primary ===
Republican primary
Party	Candidate	Votes	%
Republican	Adam J. Elias	6,687	100.0%
Total votes		6,687	100.0%

=== General election ===
Predictions

Source	Ranking	As of
New Jersey Globe	Solid D	October 28, 2021
Elections Daily	Safe D	November 1, 2021

Results

14th Legislative District general election, 2021
Party	Candidate	Votes	%
Democratic	Linda R. Greenstein (incumbent)	40,735	55.16
Republican	Adam J. Elias	33,116	44.84
Total votes		73,851	100.0
Democratic hold			

== District 15 ==
=== Democratic primary ===
Democratic primary
Party	Candidate	Votes	%
Democratic	Shirley K. Turner (incumbent)	12,254	100.0%
Total votes		12,254	100.0%

==== Endorsements ====
Shirley K. Turner

Organizations

- New Jersey League of Conservation Voters

=== Republican primary ===
Republican primary
Party	Candidate	Votes	%
Republican	Susan Gaul	2,979	100.0%
Total votes		2,979	100.0

=== General election ===
Predictions

Source	Ranking	As of
New Jersey Globe	Solid D	October 28, 2021
Elections Daily	Safe D	November 1, 2021

Results

15th Legislative District general election, 2021
Party	Candidate	Votes	%
Democratic	Shirley K. Turner (incumbent)	38,627	72.18
Republican	Susan Gaul	14,886	27.82
Total votes		53,513	100.0
Democratic hold			

== District 16 ==
=== Republican primary ===
Republican primary
Party	Candidate	Votes	%
Republican	Michael Pappas	7,146	64.5%
Republican	Jeffrey E. Grant	3,934	35.5%
Total votes		11,080	100.0%

=== Democratic primary ===
Democratic primary
Party	Candidate	Votes	%
Democratic	Andrew Zwicker	10,984	100.0%
Total votes		10,984	100.0%

==== Endorsements ====
Andrew Zwicker

Labor unions

- SEIU 32BJ

Organizations

- New Jersey League of Conservation Voters
- Working Families Party

=== General election ===
Polling

Poll source	Date(s) administered	Sample size	Margin of error	Michael Pappas (R)	Andrew Zwicker (D)
3D Strategic Research (R) (Note: Internal poll for the New Jersey Senate Republican Campaign Committee)	?	300 (LV)	± 5.7%	44%	44%

Predictions

Source	Ranking	As of
New Jersey Globe	Lean D (flip)	October 28, 2021
Elections Daily	Lean D (flip)	November 1, 2021

Debate

2021 New Jersey's 16th Senate district debate
No.	Date	Host	Moderator	Link	Republican	Democratic
Key: P Participant A Absent N Not invited I Invited W Withdrawn						
Key: P Participant A Absent N Not invited I Invited W Withdrawn					Michael Pappas	Andrew Zwicker
1	Sep. 22, 2021	League of Women Voters of the Princeton area and Somerset/Huntderdon Counties; Princeton Community Television; Raritan Valley Community College; The Montgomery News	Sandra Matson		P	P

Results

16th Legislative District general election, 2021
Party	Candidate	Votes	%
Democratic	Andrew Zwicker	41,837	53.32
Republican	Michael Pappas	36,632	46.68
Total votes		78,469	100.0
Democratic gain from Republican			

== District 17 ==
=== Democratic primary ===
Democratic primary
Party	Candidate	Votes	%
Democratic	Bob Smith (incumbent)	9,158	100.0%
Total votes		9,158	100.0%

==== Endorsements ====
Bob Smith

Organizations

- New Jersey League of Conservation Voters

=== Republican primary ===
Republican primary
Party	Candidate	Votes	%
Republican	James A. Abate	2,887	100.0%
Total votes		2,887	100.0%

=== General election ===
Predictions

Source	Ranking	As of
New Jersey Globe	Solid D	October 28, 2021
Elections Daily	Safe D	November 1, 2021

Results

17th Legislative District general election, 2021
Party	Candidate	Votes	%
Democratic	Bob Smith (incumbent)	32,455	69.11
Republican	James A. Abate	14,505	30.89
Total votes		46,960	100.0
Democratic hold			

== District 18 ==
=== Democratic primary ===
Democratic primary
Party	Candidate	Votes	%
Democratic	Patrick J. Diegnan (incumbent)	12,509	75.4%
Democratic	Mohin K. Patel	4,071	24.6%
Total votes		16,580	100.0%

==== Endorsements ====
Patrick J. Diegnan

Organizations

- New Jersey League of Conservation Voters

=== Republican primary ===
Republican primary
Party	Candidate	Votes	%
Republican	Vihal R. Patel	4,442	100.0%
Total votes		4,442	100.0%

=== General election ===
Predictions

Source	Ranking	As of
New Jersey Globe	Solid D	October 28, 2021
Elections Daily	Safe D	November 1, 2021

Results

18th Legislative District general election, 2021
Party	Candidate	Votes	%
Democratic	Patrick J. Diegnan (incumbent)	35,637	60.63
Republican	Vihal R. Patel	23,144	39.37
Total votes		58,781	100.0
Democratic hold			

== District 19 ==
=== Democratic primary ===
Democratic primary
Party	Candidate	Votes	%
Democratic	Joseph F. Vitale (incumbent)	7,906	100.0%
Total votes		7,906	100.0%

=== Republican primary ===
Republican primary
Party	Candidate	Votes	%
Republican	Christian Onuoha	3,271	100.0%
Total votes		3,271	100.0%

Following the primary, Onuoha was replaced on the ballot for the general election by Pedro "Peter" Pisar on August 23.

=== General election ===
Predictions

Source	Ranking	As of
New Jersey Globe	Solid D	October 28, 2021
Elections Daily	Safe D	November 1, 2021

Results

19th Legislative District general election, 2021
Party	Candidate	Votes	%
Democratic	Joseph F. Vitale (incumbent)	27,767	59.90
Republican	Pedro "Peter" Pisar	18,585	40.10
Total votes		46,352	100.0
Democratic hold			

== District 20 ==
=== Democratic primary ===
==== Candidates ====
- Joseph Cryan, incumbent state senator since 2018
- Jamel Holley, state assemblyman from Roselle since 2015

Withdrew

- Jason Krychiw, suspended campaign on April 23, 2021

==== Results ====
Democratic primary
Party	Candidate	Votes	%
Democratic	Joseph Cryan (incumbent)	7,804	62.5%
Democratic	Jamel C. Holley	4,176	33.5%
Democratic	Jason F. Krychiw	502	4.0%
Total votes		12,482	100.0%

==== Endorsements ====
Joe Cryan

Labor unions

- SEIU 32BJ

Organizations

- New Jersey League of Conservation Voters
- Working Families Party

=== Republican primary ===
No Republicans filed.

Republican primary
Party	Candidate	Votes	%
Republican	Write-in	35	100.0
Total votes		35	100.0

=== General election ===
Predictions

Source	Ranking	As of
New Jersey Globe	Solid D	October 28, 2021
Elections Daily	Safe D	November 1, 2021

Results

20th Legislative District general election, 2021
Party	Candidate	Votes	%
Democratic	Joseph Cryan (incumbent)	26,603	100.0
Total votes		26,603	100.0
Democratic hold			

== District 21 ==
=== Republican primary ===
Republican primary
Party	Candidate	Votes	%
Republican	Jon Bramnick	9,571	100.0%
Total votes		9,571	100.0%

=== Democratic primary ===
Democratic primary
Party	Candidate	Votes	%
Democratic	Joseph Signorello III	9,756	100.0%
Total votes		9,756	100.0%

=== General election ===
Predictions

Source	Ranking	As of
New Jersey Globe	Lean R	October 28, 2021
Elections Daily	Lean R	November 1, 2021

Results

21st Legislative District general election, 2021
Party	Candidate	Votes	%
Republican	Jon Bramnick	44,254	53.65
Democratic	Joseph Signorello III	38,237	46.35
Total votes		82,491	100.0
Republican hold			

== District 22 ==
=== Democratic primary ===
Democratic primary
Party	Candidate	Votes	%
Democratic	Nicholas P. Scutari (incumbent)	10,041	100.0%
Total votes		10,041	100.0%

=== Republican primary ===
Republican primary
Party	Candidate	Votes	%
Republican	William H. Michelson	3,827	100.0%
Total votes		3,827	100.0%

=== General election ===
Predictions

Source	Ranking	As of
New Jersey Globe	Solid D	October 28, 2021
Elections Daily	Safe D	November 1, 2021

Results

22nd Legislative District general election, 2021
Party	Candidate	Votes	%
Democratic	Nicholas P. Scutari (incumbent)	32,044	61.45
Republican	William H. Michelson	20,100	38.55
Total votes		52,144	100.0
Democratic hold			

== District 23 ==
=== Republican primary ===
Republican primary
Party	Candidate	Votes	%
Republican	Michael J. Doherty (incumbent)	14,472	100.0%
Total votes		14,472	100.0%

=== Democratic primary ===
Democratic primary
Party	Candidate	Votes	%
Democratic	Denise T. King	6,677	100.0%
Total votes		6,677	100.0%

=== General election ===
Predictions

Source	Ranking	As of
New Jersey Globe	Solid R	October 28, 2021
Elections Daily	Safe R	November 1, 2021

Results

23rd Legislative District general election, 2021
Party	Candidate	Votes	%
Republican	Michael J. Doherty (incumbent)	46,554	60.95
Democratic	Denise T. King	29,830	39.05
Total votes		76,384	100.0
Republican hold			

== District 24 ==
=== Republican primary ===
==== Candidates ====
- Daniel Cruz, member of the Andover Township Board of Education
- Steve Oroho, incumbent senator since 2008

==== Results ====
Republican primary
Party	Candidate	Votes	%
Republican	Steven V. Oroho (incumbent)	14,721	82.6%
Republican	Daniel Cruz	3,105	17.4%
Total votes		17,826	100.0%

=== Democratic primary ===
No Democrats filed. However, Frederick P. Cook received enough write-in votes to qualify for the general election.

Democratic primary
Party	Candidate	Votes	%
Democratic	Frederick P. Cook (write-in)	483	69.0
Democratic	Other write-ins	217	31.0
Total votes		700	100.0

=== General election ===
Predictions

Source	Ranking	As of
New Jersey Globe	Solid R	October 28, 2021
Elections Daily	Safe R	November 1, 2021

Results

24th Legislative District general election, 2021
Party	Candidate	Votes	%
Republican	Steven V. Oroho (incumbent)	52,628	69.37
Democratic	Frederick P. Cook	23,240	30.63
Total votes		75,868	100.0
Republican hold			

== District 25 ==
=== Republican primary ===
Republican primary
Party	Candidate	Votes	%
Republican	Anthony M. Bucco (incumbent)	12,520	100.0%
Total votes		12,520	100.0%

=== Democratic primary ===
Democratic primary
Party	Candidate	Votes	%
Democratic	Jeffrey Grayzel	8,487	100.0%
Total votes		8,487	100.0%

=== General election ===
Predictions

Source	Ranking	As of
New Jersey Globe	Likely R	October 28, 2021
Elections Daily	Likely R	November 1, 2021

Results

25th Legislative District general election, 2021
Party	Candidate	Votes	%
Republican	Anthony M. Bucco (incumbent)	43,758	57.47
Democratic	Jeffrey Grayzel	32,381	42.53
Total votes		76,139	100.0
Republican hold			

== District 26 ==
=== Republican primary ===
Republican primary
Party	Candidate	Votes	%
Republican	Joe Pennacchio (incumbent)	12,964	100.0%
Total votes		12,964	100.0%

=== Democratic primary ===
Democratic primary
Party	Candidate	Votes	%
Democratic	Christine Clarke	7,092	100.0%
Total votes		7,092	100.0%

=== General election ===
Predictions

Source	Ranking	As of
New Jersey Globe	Solid R	October 28, 2021
Elections Daily	Safe R	November 1, 2021

Results

26th Legislative District general election, 2021
Party	Candidate	Votes	%
Republican	Joe Pennacchio (incumbent)	46,057	58.94
Democratic	Christine Clarke	32,087	41.06
Total votes		78,144	100.0
Republican hold			

== District 27 ==
=== Democratic primary ===
Democratic primary
Party	Candidate	Votes	%
Democratic	Richard J. Codey (incumbent)	12,111	100.0%
Total votes		12,111	100.0%

==== Endorsements ====
Richard J. Codey

Organizations

- New Jersey League of Conservation Voters

=== Republican primary ===
Republican primary
Party	Candidate	Votes	%
Republican	Adam Kraemer	6,028	100.0%
Total votes		6,028	100.0%

=== General election ===
Predictions

Source	Ranking	As of
New Jersey Globe	Solid D	October 28, 2021
Elections Daily	Safe D	November 1, 2021

Results

27th Legislative District general election, 2021
Party	Candidate	Votes	%
Democratic	Richard J. Codey (incumbent)	50,604	64.87
Republican	Adam Kraemer	27,409	35.13
Total votes		78,013	100.0
Democratic hold			

== District 28 ==
=== Democratic primary ===
Democratic primary
Party	Candidate	Votes	%
Democratic	Ronald L. Rice (incumbent)	8,425	91.8%
Democratic	Quadir Selby	750	8.2%
Total votes		9,175	100.0%

=== Republican primary ===
Republican primary
Party	Candidate	Votes	%
Republican	Frank Contella	1,437	100.0%
Total votes		1,437	100.0%

=== General election ===
Predictions

Source	Ranking	As of
New Jersey Globe	Solid D	October 28, 2021
Elections Daily	Safe D	November 1, 2021

Results

28th Legislative District general election, 2021
Party	Candidate	Votes	%
Democratic	Ronald L. Rice (incumbent)	33,104	77.92
Republican	Frank Contella	9,383	22.08
Total votes		42,487	100.0
Democratic hold			

== District 29 ==
=== Democratic primary ===
Democratic primary
Party	Candidate	Votes	%
Democratic	M. Teresa Ruiz (incumbent)	6,289	100.0%
Total votes		6,289	100.0%

=== Republican primary ===
No Republicans filed.

Republican primary
Party	Candidate	Votes	%
Republican	Write-in		
Total votes			100.0

=== General election ===
Predictions

Source	Ranking	As of
New Jersey Globe	Solid D	October 28, 2021
Elections Daily	Safe D	November 1, 2021

Results

29th Legislative District general election, 2021
Party	Candidate	Votes	%
Democratic	M. Teresa Ruiz (incumbent)	20,706	100.0
Total votes		20,706	100.0
Democratic hold			

== District 30 ==
=== Republican primary ===
Republican primary
Party	Candidate	Votes	%
Republican	Robert W. Singer (incumbent)	9,747	100.0%
Total votes		9,747	100.0%

=== Democratic primary ===
Democratic primary
Party	Candidate	Votes	%
Democratic	Dan Stinger	4,173	100.0%
Total votes		4,173	100.0

=== General election ===
Predictions

Source	Ranking	As of
New Jersey Globe	Solid R	October 28, 2021
Elections Daily	Safe R	November 1, 2021

Results

30th Legislative District general election, 2021
Party	Candidate	Votes	%
Republican	Robert W. Singer (incumbent)	53,130	71.19
Democratic	Dan Stinger	21,506	28.81
Total votes		74,636	100.0
Republican hold			

== District 31 ==
=== Democratic primary ===
Democratic primary
Party	Candidate	Votes	%
Democratic	Sandra B. Cunningham (incumbent)	7,239	100.0%
Total votes		7,239	100.0%

=== Republican primary ===
Republican primary
Party	Candidate	Votes	%
Republican	Neil A. Schulman	979	100.0%
Total votes		979	100.0%

=== General election ===
Predictions

Source	Ranking	As of
New Jersey Globe	Solid D	October 28, 2021
Elections Daily	Safe D	November 1, 2021

Results

31st Legislative District general election, 2021
Party	Candidate	Votes	%
Democratic	Sandra B. Cunningham (incumbent)	26,699	75.28
Republican	Neil A. Schulman	8,769	24.72
Total votes		35,468	100.0
Democratic hold			

== District 32 ==
=== Democratic primary ===
==== Candidates ====
- Nicholas Sacco, incumbent senator since 1994 and Mayor of North Bergen

==== Results ====
Democratic primary
Party	Candidate	Votes	%
Democratic	Nicholas J. Sacco (incumbent)	9,819	100.0%
Total votes		9,819	100.0%

=== Republican primary ===
Republican primary
Party	Candidate	Votes	%
Republican	Juan Barbadillo	1,309	100.0%
Total votes		1,309	100.0%

=== General election ===
Predictions

Source	Ranking	As of
New Jersey Globe	Solid D	October 28, 2021
Elections Daily	Safe D	November 1, 2021

Results

32nd Legislative District general election, 2021
Party	Candidate	Votes	%
Democratic	Nicholas J. Sacco (incumbent)	23,839	71.17
Republican	Juan Barbadillo	9,659	28.83
Total votes		33,498	100.0
Democratic hold			

== District 33 ==
=== Democratic primary ===
Democratic primary
Party	Candidate	Votes	%
Democratic	Brian P. Stack (incumbent)	15,515	100.0%
Total votes		15,515	100.0%

=== Republican primary ===
Republican primary
Party	Candidate	Votes	%
Republican	Agha Khan	1,010	100.0%
Total votes		1,010	100.0%

=== General election ===
Predictions

Source	Ranking	As of
New Jersey Globe	Solid D	October 28, 2021
Elections Daily	Safe D	November 1, 2021

Results

33rd Legislative District general election, 2021
Party	Candidate	Votes	%
Democratic	Brian P. Stack (incumbent)	37,059	85.14
Republican	Agha Khan	6,466	14.86
Total votes		43,525	100.0
Democratic hold			

== District 34 ==
=== Democratic primary ===
Democratic primary
Party	Candidate	Votes	%
Democratic	Nia H. Gill (incumbent)	11,621	100.0%
Total votes		11,621	100.0%

=== Republican primary ===
Republican primary
Party	Candidate	Votes	%
Republican	Scott Pollack	1,566	100.0%
Total votes		1,566	100.0%

=== General election ===
Predictions

Source	Ranking	As of
New Jersey Globe	Solid D	October 28, 2021
Elections Daily	Safe D	November 1, 2021

Results

34th Legislative District general election, 2021
Party	Candidate	Votes	%
Democratic	Nia H. Gill (incumbent)	37,239	78.73
Republican	Scott Pollack	10,060	21.27
Total votes		47,299	100.0
Democratic hold			

== District 35 ==
=== Democratic primary ===
Democratic primary
Party	Candidate	Votes	%
Democratic	Nelida Pou (incumbent)	4,548	100.0%
Total votes		4,548	100.0%

=== Republican primary ===
Republican primary
Party	Candidate	Votes	%
Republican	Kenneth Pengitore	1,489	100.0%
Total votes		1,489	100.0%

=== General election ===
Predictions

Source	Ranking	As of
New Jersey Globe	Solid D	October 28, 2021
Elections Daily	Safe D	November 1, 2021

Results

35th Legislative District general election, 2021
Party	Candidate	Votes	%
Democratic	Nelida Pou (incumbent)	20,464	68.59
Republican	Kenneth Pengitore	9,372	31.41
Total votes		29,836	100.0
Democratic hold			

== District 36 ==
=== Democratic primary ===
Democratic primary
Party	Candidate	Votes	%
Democratic	Paul A. Sarlo (incumbent)	4,627	100.0%
Total votes		4,627	100.0%

=== Republican primary ===
Republicans Chris Auriemma filed to run, withdrew, and then received enough write-in votes to qualify for the general election.

Republican primary
Party	Candidate	Votes	%
Republican	Chris Auriemma (write-in)	115	71.0
Republican	Other write-ins	47	29.0
Total votes		162	100.0

=== General election ===
Predictions

Source	Ranking	As of
New Jersey Globe	Solid D	October 28, 2021
Elections Daily	Safe D	November 1, 2021

Results

36th Legislative District general election, 2021
Party	Candidate	Votes	%
Democratic	Paul A. Sarlo (incumbent)	25,373	56.86
Republican	Chris Auriemma	19,252	43.14
Total votes		44,625	100.0
Democratic hold			

== District 37 ==
=== Democratic primary ===
Democratic primary
Party	Candidate	Votes	%
Democratic	Gordon M. Johnson	10,404	72.2
Democratic	Valerie Vainieri Huttle	4,011	27.8
Total votes		14,415	100.0%

Debate

2021 New Jersey's 37th Senate district democratic primary debate
No.	Date	Host	Moderator	Link	Democratic	Democratic
Key: P Participant A Absent N Not invited I Invited W Withdrawn						
Key: P Participant A Absent N Not invited I Invited W Withdrawn					Gordon M. Johnson	Valerie Vainieri Huttle
1	May 2, 2021	New Jersey Globe	David Wildstein		P	P

==== Endorsements ====
Gordon Johnson

Governors

- Phil Murphy, Governor of New Jersey
- Sheila Oliver, Lieutenant Governor of New Jersey

Congressmen

- Josh Gottheimer, U.S. Congressman from New Jersey’s 5th District
- Bill Pascrell, U.S. Congressman from New Jersey’s 9th district

Mayors

- Christopher Chung, Mayor of Palisades Park, NJ
- James Dunleavy, Mayor of Teaneck, NJ
- John Labrosse, Mayor of Hackensack, NJ
- Mark Sokolich, Mayor of Fort Lee, NJ
- Michael Wildes, Mayor of Englewood, NJ
- Judah Ziegler, Mayor of Leonia, NJ
- Mark Zinna, Mayor of Tenafly, NJ

State legislators

- Joe Lagana, New Jersey State Senator
- Loretta Weinberg, Senate Majority Leader of New Jersey
- Benjie E. Wimberly, New Jersey State Assemblyman

Democratic chairs

- John Bang, District 37 Democratic Chair
- Anthony Cureton, Bergen County Sheriff
- Greta Grewal-Virk, Democratic Vice Chair of Bergen County
- John Hogan, District 37 Treasurer
- Lynn Hurwitz, Democratic Municipal Chair
- Paul Juliano, Democratic Chairman of the Bergen County
- Zonie LeSane, District 37 Vice Chair
- Marc Macri, Democratic Municipal Chair
- Kenneth Martin, District 37 Secretary
- Michelle Rupar, Democratic Municipal Chair
- Joan S. Voss, Bergen County Commissioner

Council people

- Tom Argiro, Northvale Councilman
- Lou Battaglia, Hackensack Councilman
- Charles Cobb, Englewood Councilman
- Michael Cohen, Englewood Councilman
- Lou DeLiso, Northvale Councilman
- Ed Develin, Northvale Councilman
- Jo Ellen Granquist, Bogota Councilwoman
- Paul Kim, Palisades Park Councilman
- JongChul Lee, Palisades Park Councilman
- Judith Maron, Englewood Councilwoman
- Andy Min, Palisades Park Councilman
- Mary Ellen Murphy, Bogota Councilwoman
- Michael Pagan, Teaneck Councilman
- Daniel Park, Tenafly Councilman
- Ellen Park, Englewood Cliffs Councilwoman
- Jae Park, Palisades Park Councilman
- Robert Robbins, Bogota Councilman
- Kenneth Rosenzweig, Englewood Councilman
- Peter Suh, Fort Lee Councilman
- Paul Yoon, Fort Lee Councilman

Organizations

- Bergen County Building and Construction’s Trade Council
- Carpenters Union (Eastern Atlantic States Council of Carpenters)
- Hotel and Motel Trades Council
- International Longshoremen’s Association (ILA)
- International Union of Operating Engineers (Local 825)
- Laborer's International Union of North America (LIUNA)
- Latino American Democratic Association of New Jersey
- New Jersey Firefighters Union
- New Jersey League of Conservation Voters
- United Food and Commercial Workers (UFCW)
- United Service Workers Union
Valerie Vainieri Huttle

Organizations

- EMILY's List
- Working Families Party

=== Republican primary ===
Republican primary
Party	Candidate	Votes	%
Republican	Michael W. Koontz	1,124	100.0%
Total votes		1,124	100.0%

=== General election ===
Predictions

Source	Ranking	As of
New Jersey Globe	Solid D	October 28, 2021
Elections Daily	Safe D	November 1, 2021

Results

37th Legislative District general election, 2021
Party	Candidate	Votes	%
Democratic	Gordon M. Johnson	34,410	67.04
Republican	Michael W. Koontz	16,155	31.48
New Directions	Glenn Coley	759	1.48
Total votes		51,324	100.0
Democratic hold			

== District 38 ==
=== Democratic primary ===
==== Candidates ====
- Joseph Lagana, incumbent senator since 2018

==== Results ====
Democratic primary
Party	Candidate	Votes	%
Democratic	Joseph A. Lagana (incumbent)	6,564	100.0%
Total votes		6,564	100.0%

=== Republican primary ===
Republican primary
Party	Candidate	Votes	%
Republican	Richard Garcia	5,484	100.0%
Total votes		5,484	100.0%

=== General election ===
Predictions

Source	Ranking	As of
New Jersey Globe	Solid D	October 28, 2021
Elections Daily	Safe D	November 1, 2021

Results

38th Legislative District general election, 2021
Party	Candidate	Votes	%
Democratic	Joseph A. Lagana (incumbent)	34,895	52.90
Republican	Richard Garcia	31,069	47.10
Total votes		65,964	100.0
Democratic hold			

== District 39 ==
=== Republican primary ===
==== Candidates ====
- Holly Schepisi, incumbent senator since 2021

==== Results ====
Republican primary
Party	Candidate	Votes	%
Republican	Holly Schepisi (incumbent)	9,212	100.0%
Total votes		9,212	100.0%

=== Democratic primary ===
Democratic primary
Party	Candidate	Votes	%
Democratic	Ruth Dugan	6,476	100.0%
Total votes		6,476	100.0%

=== General election ===
Predictions

Source	Ranking	As of
New Jersey Globe	Likely R	October 28, 2021
Elections Daily	Likely R	November 1, 2021

Results

39th Legislative District general election, 2021
Party	Candidate	Votes	%
Republican	Holly Schepisi (incumbent)	45,985	57.16
Democratic	Ruth Dugan	34,065	42.34
Libertarian	James Tosone	403	0.50
Total votes		80,453	100.0
Republican hold			

== District 40 ==
=== Republican primary ===
Republican primary
Party	Candidate	Votes	%
Republican	Kristin M. Corrado (incumbent)	9,726	100.0%
Total votes		9,726	100.0%

=== Democratic primary ===
Democratic primary
Party	Candidate	Votes	%
Democratic	Michael A. Sedon	5,842	100.0%
Total votes		5,842	100.0%

=== General election ===
Predictions

Source	Ranking	As of
New Jersey Globe	Solid R	October 28, 2021
Elections Daily	Safe R	November 1, 2021

Results

40th Legislative District general election, 2021
Party	Candidate	Votes	%
Republican	Kristin M. Corrado (incumbent)	47,230	60.97
Democratic	Michael A. Sedon	30,237	39.03
Total votes		77,467	100.0
Republican hold			

== See also ==
- 2021 New Jersey elections
- 2021 New Jersey General Assembly election
- List of New Jersey state legislatures
