= Matthew Feldman =

American politician (1919–1994)

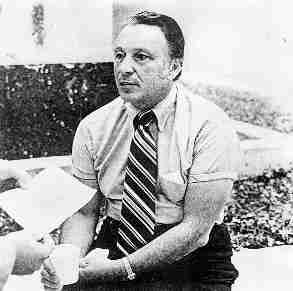
- Campaign brochure published by Citizens for Feldman, Teaneck, New Jersey, 1973.

Member of the New Jersey Senate
- In office January 11, 1966 – January 9, 1968 Serving with Ned Parsekian, Jeremiah F. O'Connor, and Alfred W. Kiefer
- Preceded by: Pierce H. Deamer Jr. (single-member)
- Succeeded by: Multi-member district
- Constituency: 13th district (Bergen)
- In office January 8, 1974 – January 11, 1994
- Preceded by: District created
- Succeeded by: Byron Baer
- Constituency: 37th District

President of the New Jersey Senate
- In office January 1976 – January 1978
- Preceded by: Frank J. Dodd
- Succeeded by: Joseph P. Merlino

New Jersey Senate Majority Leader
- In office January 1974 – January 1976
- Preceded by: Alfred D. Schiaffo
- Succeeded by: Joseph P. Merlino

Mayor of Teaneck
- In office February 1959 – January 1966
- Preceded by: August Hanniball Jr.
- Succeeded by: Thomas Costa

Personal details
- Born: March 22, 1919 Jersey City, New Jersey, U.S.
- Died: April 11, 1994 (aged 75) Teaneck, New Jersey, U.S.
- Party: Democratic
- Spouse: Muriel Gunsberg Feldman

Military service
- Allegiance: United States of America
- Branch/service: United States Army Air Forces
- Rank: Captain
- Battles/wars: World War II

Matthew Feldman (March 22, 1919 – April 11, 1994) was an American Democratic Party politician who served as a New Jersey State Senator and Mayor of Teaneck, New Jersey.

As Mayor of Teaneck in the early 1960s, he achieved racial and political harmony during the integration of its schools and neighborhoods. He served as the president of the New Jersey Senate from 1976 to 1978.

== Early life ==
Feldman was born on March 22, 1919, in Jersey City, New Jersey, the son of Samuel and Mary Feldman, both Jewish immigrants from Poland. He had an older brother, Norman, and a younger brother, Melvin. He attended Henry Snyder High School. He excelled in basketball and boxing, and joined the boxing team at the University of North Carolina. He used his physical prowess to "bust up" pro-Nazi German American Bund rallies held in North Bergen in the late 1930s, acting as a "heckler, protester, and street fighter".

He served as a U.S. Air Force Captain during World War II, and later served as New Jersey State Commander of the Jewish War Veterans. He later attended Panzer College.

According to Feldman's longtime friend Leon Sokol, in 1946, Feldman was driving on Route 17 when he spotted a sign for new housing in Ridgewood reading "Restricted Development", code for no Jews or blacks. Feldman stopped the car, called some veteran friends and staged the forerunner of a "flash" protest.

Feldman moved to Teaneck in 1947 after marrying Muriel Gunsberg. He joined the Federal Wine and Liquor Company, a liquor distribution business started by his father and uncle.

== Mayor of Teaneck (1959-66) ==
In 1958, Feldman was elected to the non-partisan Teaneck Township Council and was re-elected in 1962 with over 75% of the vote.

In February 1959, he became the mayor of Teaneck following the death of Mayor August Hanniball Jr. He served as mayor until 1966.

According to Feldman, the Bergen County Republican organization attempted to recruit him to run as a "New Jersey Jacob Javits". Feldman told a New York Times reporter in 1972 that his political identity was solidified by John F. Kennedy:

"Then Kennedy came into town in 1960. He electrified me. It was that that made me go into partisan politics. I felt you had to be a Democrat. Nothing else made sense."

Columnist Charles Stile of The Record later wrote that Feldman's "awakening occurred just as Teaneck threatened to become a racial tinderbox over a plan to integrate the Teaneck Public Schools – a plan advanced by the pioneering Superintendent of Schools Harvey B. Scribner, which created a new, central-sixth Bryant School in the predominantly black northeast section of Teaneck. It involved busing some students, which sparked the uproar."

Officially, Feldman and the rest of the Teaneck Council remained neutral, citing a separation of powers between the municipal government and the elected Board of Education. In September 1964, Feldman was interviewed on WJRZ radio following threats of boycotting the opening day of school and of violence. Feldman told listeners: "But I appeal to you, I urge you not to use 11- and 12-year-old children as weapons in a conflict between adults. Do not confuse your children by telling them that the obedience of law and authority is essential and then telling them that they don't have to attend school even though the law requires them to do so." School opened with no violence or large protests.

== New Jersey Senate (1966-68, 1974-94) ==
=== Elections ===
==== 1965 election ====
In its landmark decision Reynolds v. Sims, the United States Supreme Court required state legislatures to apportion districts as proportionally as possible. Prior to this decision, New Jersey apportioned its Senate at a rate of one member per county; in 1965, the state used a new allocation which maintained county boundaries but apportioned multiple Senators to some counties or combined counties with low populations. Because of its large population, Bergen County had four Senators under the new system.

Feldman became one of the four Democratic candidates, running on the party organization ticket with Ned Parsekian, Jeremiah F. O'Connor, and Alfred Kiefer. In the Democratic primary, the four easily defeated two insurgent candidates, Jeanette L. Winslow and Allan L. Fletcher.

The Democratic general election campaign was aided by the presence of popular Democratic governor Richard J. Hughes at the top of the ticket, and by a major division among Bergen County Republicans that led to incumbent GOP Senator Pierce H. Deamer Jr. being dumped from the organization line. The organization slate won decisively.

In the general election, Democrats won all four Bergen County Senate seats. Feldman ran second of the four, and out polled the leading Republican vote getter by more than 11,000 votes.

==== 1967 election ====
In 1967, Feldman was a candidate for re-election to a second term in the Senate. Another round of reapportionment gave Bergen County a fifth Senate seat, and the incumbents ran with Cliffside Park Mayor Gerald Calabrese. They easily defeated Richard Lapidus, a physics professor at Stevens Institute of Technology, in the primary election. However, in a strongly Republican year, Fairleigh Dickinson Jr., Joseph C. Woodcock, Alfred D. Schiaffo, Garrett W. Hagedorn, and Willard B. Knowlton won all five Bergen County State Senate seats by a wide margin. Feldman ran seventh, finishing more than 53,000 votes behind the fifth place Republican.

==== 1973 election ====
In 1973, the Senate was fully redistricted into its modern system: forty districts with one Senator and two Assembly members for each, with lines tracing town, rather than county, boundaries.

Teaneck was placed in the new 37th district, along with other Democratic-leaning towns. Feldman ran again for the Senate, with incumbent Assemblymen Albert Burstein and Byron Baer running with him. In the general election, he faced incumbent Joseph C. Woodcock and won, 36,690 (58.62%) to 25,524 (40.78%).

==== 1977 election ====
Feldman announced in April 1977 that he would seek re-election to the Senate. He was unopposed in the Democratic primary. In the general election campaign, Republican William C. Clark, a former Bergenfield Councilman, hammered Feldman on his ethical issues, and on the "totality of his record. "Here's a man making laws in Trenton and breaking them in his business. It's incredible. It gives the state a black eye." Feldman called his actions a "misadventure and an error in judgment", and said the prosecution was just politics. He touted an endorsement from a former Republican senator, Fairleigh Dickinson Jr., who had unseated Feldman a decade earlier. Feldman won by 10,222 votes, 31,945 (58.98%) to 21,723 (40.11%), winning re-election by an even higher percentage than in the Democratic landslide of 1973.

Feldman was re-elected in 1981 with 62% against attorney Barbara L. deMare, with 64% against Bergen County Bar Association President Michael L. Kingman in 1983, and 67% against Shel Haas in 1987.

==== 1991 election ====
Feldman's last Senate campaign was in 1991, when he was 72 years old and dealing with some serious health issues. 1991 was a Republican landslide year after Governor James Florio sought a $2.8 billion tax increase — the largest increase of any state in U.S. history. He faced a tough Republican challenger, 35-year-old Todd Caliguire, who had served as Assistant Counsel to Governor Thomas Kean. Feldman survived, narrowly, beating Caliguire by just 3,264 votes, 24,309 (53.60%) to 21,045 (46.40%).

=== Term in office ===
During his first term in the state senate, Feldman served as the Assistant Majority Leader and as chairman of the Senate Education Committee. He led the fight to establish the Department of Higher Education and for increases in state education funding at all levels. He sponsored legislation that created the New Jersey Motion Picture and Television Development Commission.

Upon returning to the Senate in 1974, Feldman was elected Senate Majority Leader, a post he held in 1974 and 1975. In 1976 and 1977, Feldman was the Senate President. The incumbent Senate President, Frank J. Dodd, had hoped to keep the post, but Feldman received the support of a majority of Democratic senators and Dodd withdrew as a candidate for the leadership post. Feldman ran with the support of Byrne, who was forced to back off a plan to allow crossover votes in primaries. At times when Byrne was out of state, Feldman served as acting governor.

Feldman was the Senate President Pro-Tempore from 1978 to 1982. He served as chairman of the Senate Education Committee from 1978 to 1992. Feldman served in the majority for all but the final two years of his Senate career.

In 1990, Feldman helped steer through the Senate Jim Florio's transformation of state aid and teacher pensions after he arranged for Bergen County school districts to receive special transportation aid that districts in no other county were eligible for.

==== State income tax ====
In 1973, the New Jersey Supreme Court ruled that school children in urban and rural areas of the state were being denied a "thorough and efficient education", because public schools relied on local property taxes to fund education. The Court ordered the state to provide funding for urban and rural school districts on par with the suburbs by July 1, 1976. Governor Byrne proposed a state income tax as the only practical means of compliance. Byrne's proposed income tax legislation only narrowly passed the State Assembly. Feldman, a staunch political ally of Byrne, led the income tax negotiations in the Senate. Refusing to allow senators to leave the chamber, Feldman played a key role in passing the tax plan, negotiating through the Bicentennial weekend and passing the package on July 8. Though initially unpopular, Byrne and Feldman were re-elected and Democrats held their majorities in the state senate and General Assembly.

==== Bribery conviction and attempted expulsion ====
On October 12, 1976, federal prosecutors charged Feldman and his son with bribing a restaurant chain employee to secure business for Federal Wine & Liquor. The Feldmans appeared in federal court on October 19 and entered not guilty pleas. Feldman was serving as acting governor on the date of his court appearance, as Governor Byrne was traveling in Japan. A third defendant, vice president of Emerson's Ltd. Donald Schwartz, pleaded guilty. Federal prosecutors alleged Feldman had paid $6,400 in cash to Schwartz in order to win about $240,000 in liquor business. Schwartz testified that one payment had come in an envelope "bearing the New Jersey Senate seal". Feldman did not deny that he had paid Schwartz but sought to have his indictment dismissed, claiming his prosecution by U.S. Attorney Jonathan Goldstein, a Republican appointed by Richard Nixon, was politically motivated and that such payments were common practice in the liquor distribution business.

On November 26, 1976, Feldman changed his plea to guilty. Addressing U.S. District Court Judge Frederick Bernard Lacey, Feldman sought to differentiate between his actions as a businessman and his duties as a State Senator: "Matty Feldman, State Senator, never met with Schwartz. It was Matty Feldman, Vice President of Federal Wine and Liquor, who met with him."

There were some questions regarding Feldman's legal right to serve in the Senate under New Jersey law stating that anyone convicted of a crime of moral turpitude is ineligible to serve. New Jersey Attorney General William Hyland deferred the question to the Senate, saying the Senate had the constitutional right to determine the qualifications of its own members. On December 13, 1976, the Chief Counsel to the New Jersey Legislature, William M. Lanning, issued an opinion that Feldman's conviction on federal commercial bribery charges did not involve "fraudulent, dishonest or corrupt conduct", and he could remain in the state senate. Attorney General Hyland concurred with the opinion.

When the New Jersey Legislature met on January 10, 1977, for the opening of the legislative session, Republicans made an attempt to remove Feldman but lost the vote 24–10. All Senate Republicans voted against him, and five Democratic senators did not vote at all. In March 1977, a state Superior Court Judge refused to remove Feldman from office, saying he had no authority to override the Senate's decision. A lawsuit seeking Feldman's ouster had been filed by Wyckoff councilman Henry McNamara, a Republican and Feldman's future Senate colleague.

== Other political activities ==
After leaving the Senate, Feldman was elected Bergen County Democratic Chairman in 1968. He held that post until 1973.

=== 1986 Bergen County Executive campaign ===
Bergen County voters chose to change their form of county government in a 1985 referendum, creating a new post of County Executive. The first election would be in 1986. Feldman, whose 1976 conviction ended his hopes of running for governor, surprised political observers by announcing that he would run for Bergen County Executive. He faced no opposition in the Democratic primary after his only rival, Freeholder Doris Mahalick, dropped out due to lack of organizational support and fundraising resources.

Feldman was the favorite in the general election against Republican William D. McDowell, the Bergen County Sheriff. Feldman criticized McDowell's management skills, citing a state audit that criticized fire-safety measures and medical procedures at the county jail run by McDowell. McDowell said Feldman had falsely claimed in campaign literature that he authored a 1966 Senate bill creating Bergen County Community College, noting that the college had been founded the year before Feldman was elected to the Senate. McDowell also touted an endorsement from Mahalick. While McDowell held to his promise not to raise Feldman's 1976 bribery conviction, Republican surrogates did it for him. McDowell beat Feldman, 112,619 (55%) to 92,649 (45%).

== Retirement, death, and legacy ==
On February 17, 1993, Feldman announced that he would not seek re-election to an eighth term in the Senate. In a letter to Democratic County Committee members, Feldman wrote: "For the Democratic Party to remain vital, it must continually redefine and renew itself. To do that, it must permit younger people to move up into positions of responsibility." Feldman told The Record, "We've been agonizing over this for months. The family has insisted that I've given public service over 30 years. It's time to conclude that public service." He cited the election of Bill Clinton and Al Gore in 1992 as evidence of the importance of "passing the baton to a new generation".

Feldman's wife, Muriel, died on November 7, 1993. He continued to battle health issues after leaving the Senate in January, 1994, and he died on April 11, 1994, at Holy Name Medical Center in Teaneck, aged 75, four months after leaving the Senate.

=== Legacy ===
In a 2011 profile, columnist Charles Stile of The Record wrote, "Matthew Feldman was the master of New Jersey's Senate for nearly 30 years, a legislative broker of the old school. He deployed a shrewd, conciliatory style, relying more on persuasion than partisan attacks or campaign cash. Feldman was more inclined to grab a colleague with a warm bear hug than twist their arm."

The advisory board on Community Relations of the Township of Teaneck recognizes worthy individuals and organizations with the Matthew Feldman Community Service Award, named in his honor.

Teaneck designated about 16 acres of the Roemer Woods as the Senator Matthew Feldman Nature Preserve.

Political offices
Preceded by Frank J. Dodd	President of the New Jersey Senate; 1976-1977	Succeeded by Joseph P. Merlino
