= Valerie Huttle =

American politician (born 1956)

Member of the New Jersey General Assembly from the 37th district
- In office January 10, 2006 – January 11, 2022 Serving with Gordon M. Johnson
- Preceded by: Loretta Weinberg
- Succeeded by: Shama Haider; Ellen Park

Member of the Bergen County Board of Chosen Freeholders
- In office January 1, 2001 – December 31, 2006
- Preceded by: Richard Mola; William Van Dyke
- Succeeded by: Julie O'Brien; Connie Wagner

Personal details
- Born: Valerie Vainieri; September 15, 1956 (age 70) Englewood, New Jersey, U.S.
- Party: Democratic
- Spouse: Frank Huttle
- Children: 2
- Education: Fairleigh Dickinson University (BA); Rider University

Valerie Vainieri Huttle (born September 15, 1956) is an American Democratic Party politician who served in the New Jersey General Assembly where she represented the 37th Legislative District, from 2006 to 2022. Huttle served on the Bergen County Board of Chosen Freeholders from 2001 through 2006.

In the Assembly, Huttle served on the Homeland Security and State Preparedness (chair), Labor (vice-chair), and Tourism, Gaming and the Arts Committees.

== Biography and early political career ==
Huttle was born in 1956 to Anthony P. and Natalie Vainieri. Her family founded the Vainieri Funeral Home in North Bergen. Huttle is a state-licensed funeral director, and has served as president of the funeral home since 1981.

Her father served on the North Bergen Board of Commissioners and one term in the General Assembly from the 32nd District from 1983 to 1985. Her brother Anthony P. Vainieri, Jr. is currently the chair of the Hudson County Board of County Commissioners.

Huttle graduated cum laude from Fairleigh Dickinson University in 1980 with a B.A. in English, and received state certification for teaching. She also attended Rider University, but did not receive a degree.

Huttle is a former member of the board of Palisades General Hospital and founder of the Southern Bergen County Homeowners Association. She is also a co-founder of Women Involved Now, an educational and social network for women in the community. Huttle sits on the board of trustees as vice president of Shelter Our Sisters, an organization that brings awareness to the plight of victims of domestic violence while providing hope and revitalization to their lives through counseling and direct care. She is a former trustee of Vantage Health.

While a resident of Cliffside Park, Huttle mounted a bid for the New Jersey Senate in 1997 in the 38th District against Republican incumbent Louis F. Kosco. Despite raising more funds in the campaign than Kosco, she was defeated by him in the general election 55% to 42%. Three years later, in 2000, by now a resident of Englewood, she and running mate Jack Alter (the mayor of Fort Lee) defeated Republican incumbent Bergen County Freeholders Richard Mola and J. William Van Dyke. Two years later, on January 2, 2003, she was unanimously chosen by her peers to serve the board as the first ever chairwoman under its present county executive form of government. She returned to the chairperson's seat again in 2004.

As freeholder, Huttle sat on the Community Oversight Board at Bergen Regional Medical Center during her first two years of service, providing oversight of the privately managed county hospital. She has also served on the county Board of Social Services, and is a member of the Community Action Partnership Board of Trustees, where she worked for development of a one-stop homeless shelter to better address the needs of that growing population. She was a member of the Board of School Estimate at the Bergen County Technical Schools, a member of the Board of School Estimate at Bergen Community College, and chair of the Freeholder committee for Health and Human Services. After serving one year as both an assemblywoman and freeholder, she declined to seek re-election in 2006 to the Freeholder Board.

Huttle is a resident of Englewood, where she lives with her husband Frank Huttle III and their two daughters, Alexandra and Francesca. Frank Huttle has served as mayor of Englewood since January 2010, succeeding Michael Wildes. Huttle and her husband were inducted into the Equestrian Order of the Holy Sepulchre of Jerusalem in ceremonies held in September 2000 at St. Patrick's Cathedral in New York City, having been recommended for the honor by Cardinal Theodore McCarrick. Archbishop Edward Egan designated Mrs. Huttle a Dame and Mr. Huttle a Knight of the order.

== Legislative career ==
After the resignation of District 37 State Senator Byron Baer on September 8, 2005, Huttle had put her name in the ring to fill the Senate vacancy. Ultimately, she withdrew and endorsed Assemblywoman Loretta Weinberg of Teaneck to fill the seat. On October 5, after an extended legal battle related to inclusion of five disputed ballots, Weinberg was ultimately victorious over Hackensack Police Chief Ken Zisa in her bid to replace Baer, both on an interim basis and on the November general election ballot.

With Weinberg's court victory, Huttle and Engelwood Mayor Michael Wildes both announced their candidacies for Weinberg's Assembly slot on the November general election ballot, and to fill the balance of her term in the Assembly once she took her seat in the Senate. The choice was decided by another special convention of the Bergen County Democratic Committee on October 6, 2005, with Huttle out-polling Wildes 121-96 (Huttle would ultimately not serve the remainder of Weinberg's term). Running together with Weinberg and incumbent Assemblyman Gordon M. Johnson, Huttle was elected on Election Day, November 8, 2005, to the Assembly, and was sworn in as a new member on January 10, 2006, the first day of the 212th Legislative Session.

As of 2015, Huttle chairs the Assembly Human Services Committee, and sits on the Tourism, Gaming and the Arts Committee and the New Jersey Legislative Select Committee on Investigation investigating the Fort Lee lane closure scandal. Since 2015, she has served as a deputy speaker.

Following a legislative study mission to Israel in 2016, Huttle along with other Assembly Democrats sponsored an anti-BDS bill barring the state's pension funds from investing in companies that boycott Israel or Israeli businesses.

In 2021, Huttle announced she would seek the District 37 Senate seat due to Loretta Weinberg's announcement that she would be retiring at the end of her term, going against fellow Assemblyman Gordon Johnson in the 2021 Democratic primary. Huttle was endorsed by the New Jersey Working Families Party and EMILY's List. However, she lacked her local Democratic party's support, as they elected to back Johnson to bracket with the Democratic Party on the primary ballot. Due to this, Huttle made changing ballot design and party endorsements part of her campaign, aligning with local progressive groups pushing for this. Huttle lost the primary, being defeated by Johnson 3-1.

New Jersey General Assembly
Preceded by Loretta Weinberg	Member of the New Jersey General Assembly from the 37th District; 2006–2022; Served alongside: Gordon M. Johnson	Succeeded by Shama Haider; Ellen Park
