= Gordon M. Johnson =

American politician

Gordon Johnson
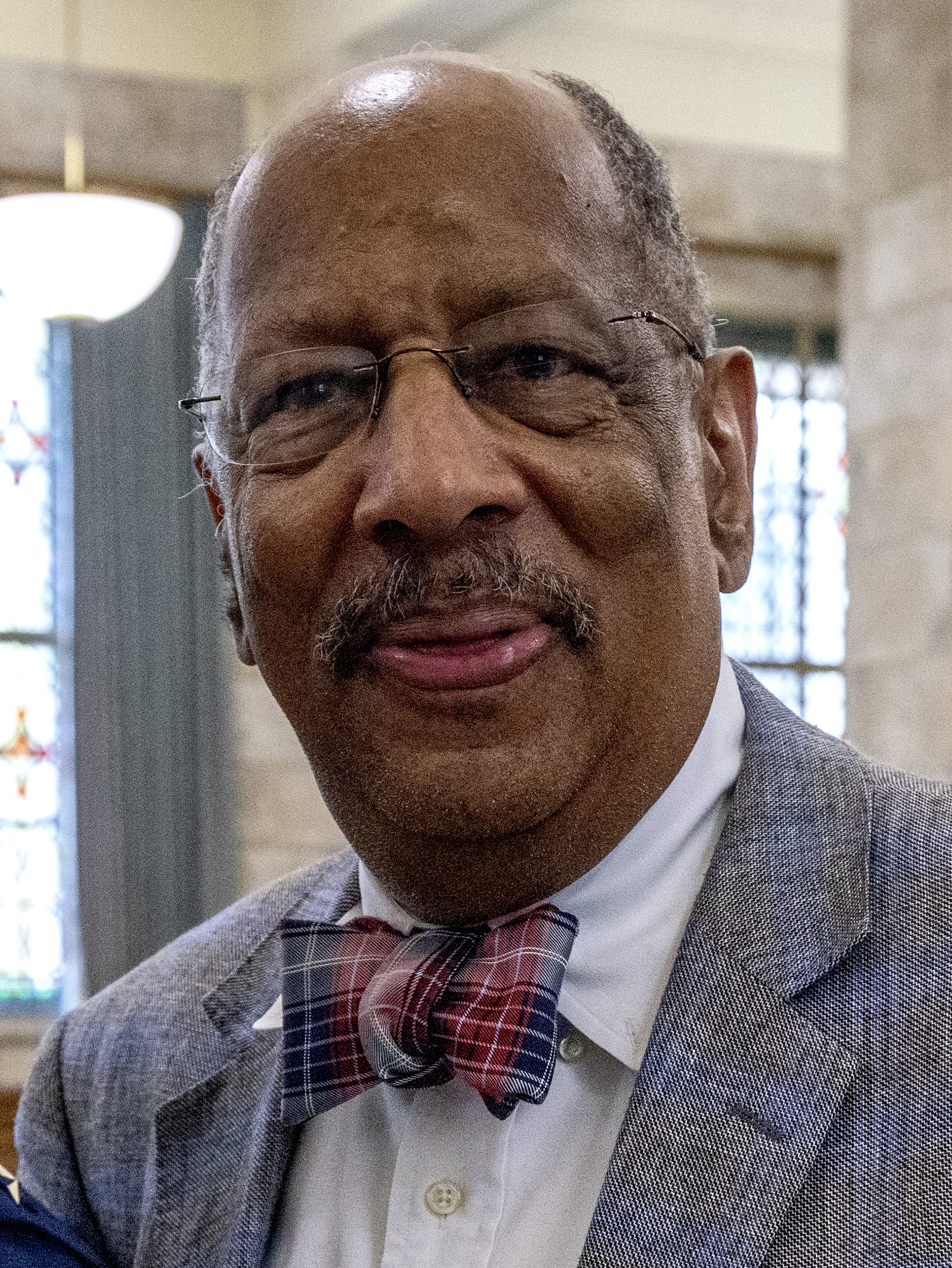

Member of the New Jersey Senate from the 37th district
- Incumbent
- Assumed office January 11, 2022
- Preceded by: Loretta Weinberg

Speaker pro tempore of the New Jersey General Assembly
- In office May 24, 2018 – January 11, 2022
- Preceded by: Jerry Green
- Succeeded by: Benjie E. Wimberly

Member of the New Jersey General Assembly from the 37th district
- In office January 8, 2002 – January 11, 2022
- Preceded by: Ken Zisa
- Succeeded by: Shama Haider; Ellen Park

Personal details
- Born: December 16, 1949 (age 76) New York City, New York, U.S.
- Party: Democratic
- Spouse: Jacqueline
- Children: 3
- Education: St. Thomas Aquinas College (BA); Seton Hall University (MA)
- Website: Legislative webpage

Gordon M. Johnson (born December 16, 1949) is an American Democratic Party politician who has represented the 37th Legislative District in the New Jersey Senate since 2022, having represented the same district in the New Jersey General Assembly from 2002 to 2022. He has served in the Senate since 2022 as Assistant Majority Leader.

== Biography ==
Johnson grew up in Englewood, New Jersey, where he still resides. His mother was a nurse and his father was a United States Customs Agent. He attended St. Cecilia High School, received a B.S. from St. Thomas Aquinas College in Social Science and Criminal Justice, and an M.A. from Seton Hall University in Administration and Supervision. He served in the United States Army Reserve with the rank of Major (United States), and participated in Operation Desert Storm in 1990 and 1991 and Operation Joint Endeavor in 1996. Johnson retired with the rank of Major from the United States Army Reserve in 2000. He is highly decorated and holds the National Defense Service Medal, Bronze Star, Meritorious Service Medal, Southwest Asia Service Medal, NATO Service Medal, and Kuwait Liberation Medal.

He was the Bergen County Sheriff from 2001 to 2002, and was with the Bergen County Sheriff’s Department since 1999. Mr. Johnson was the first African-American to hold countywide office in Bergen and was the first African-American Sheriff in Bergen County. Johnson served as an undersheriff in the Bergen County Sheriff’s Department, a position he has filled from 1999 to 2001 and from 2002 to 2005. In the days following September 11, 2001, Sheriff Johnson served as commander of the George Washington Bridge as part Bergen County's response to the terrorist attacks. According to the Record, Sheriff Johnson "has widely been credited with helping to ease the rancor and divisiveness within the department."

He served for 24 years with the Englewood Police Department, attaining the rank of patrol sergeant. He is also experienced in labor relations and served as president of the State P.B.A. Supervisory Officers Association-Local #216.

On June 6, 2006, Johnson won the Democratic Party primary for the Engelwood City Council at-large by unseating incumbent Rev. Vernon Walton; Victory in the primary is tantamount to winning the seat in this Democratic Party stronghold. On Election Day, November 7, 2006, Johnson won the at-large seat, defeating Republican Harry Kanner. Johnson received 5,132 votes, with Kanner receiving 1,501 votes. In August 2008, Johnson announced that he will be stepping down from his Englewood City Council seat by March 2008. While Johnson was grandfathered in from legislation banning dual office holding, he would step down to "follow the will of the people".

== New Jersey General Assembly ==
Gordon Johnson began his first term as a State Assemblyman in 2002, running on a ticket with Senator Byron Baer and Assemblywoman Loretta Weinberg. During his first term, he was the prime sponsor of laws to expand DNA collection from violent offenders and requiring towing companies to accept cash and credit card payment.

Johnson served as Chair of the Assembly Law and Public Safety Committee from 2006 to 2011 before becoming Majority Conference Leader in 2011. During his tenure as Chair, the committee took up legislation to abolish the death penalty. The committee also took up the issue of DNA evidence, expanding the collection of DNA for use by police, defendants, and those currently incarcerated. He has sponsored laws to commemorate the comfort women of World War II, enhanced the Crime Victim's Bill of Rights, and reform the State Board of Medical Examiners. Johnson was the prime sponsor of legislation in the Assembly that would limit rent increases for certain seniors. Other bills have included the "DREAMer's act" a law that expands access to education for certain New Jersey students, rail and transportation safety, and veterans issues. Assemblyman Johnson recently sponsored legislation to expand New Jersey's film and digital media production tax credit program to generate revenue and jobs in New Jersey.

During his 2007 campaign for the Assembly, Assemblyman Johnson faced Republican challengers Frank J. Cifarelli and Wojciech J. Siemaszkiewicz. Assemblyman Johnson received 21,228 votes, with the Republican vote at 9,051 and 8,921. In the 2009 general election, Johnson faced Republicans Barry Bellin and Siemaszkiewicz. Johnson received 32,845 votes with the Republicans receiving 16,266 and 15,635 votes. In the general elections in years 2011 and 2013 Assemblyman Johnson outpaced Republican challengers by an almost 2-1 margin.

In 2007 Johnson's contributions to Lyndon LaRouche's political action committee became a subject of criticism. Johnson reportedly gave a total of $1,850 in 2005 and 2006. He apologized repeatedly, saying he regretted not vetting the organization more carefully. Johnson was reelected handily, though he received 1,200 fewer votes than his running mate, a dropoff of over 5%.

In the Assembly, he served as Deputy Conference Leader from 2010 to 2011, as Majority Conference Leader from 2012 to 2013, as Deputy Speaker from 2014 to 2018 and as Speaker Pro Tempore 2018 from 2021.

== New Jersey Senate ==
In 2021, after Loretta Weinberg's announcement that she would be retiring at the end of her term, Johnson declared he would seek the District 37 Senate seat. Johnson's bid was endorsed by both Governor Phil Murphy and Senator Weinberg, along with the backing of the Bergen County Democratic party. Johnson went against fellow Assemblywoman Valerie Vainieri-Huttle in the 2021 Democratic Primary and won, defeating her 3-1.

Since 2022, Johnson has served in the Senate as Assistant Majority Leader.

=== Committees ===
Committee assignments for the 2024—2025 Legislative Session are:

- Military and Veterans' Affairs (as chair)
- Budget and Appropriations
- Commerce

=== District 37 ===
Each of the 40 districts in the New Jersey Legislature has one representative in the New Jersey Senate and two members in the New Jersey General Assembly. The representatives from the 37th District for the 2024—2025 Legislative Session are:

- Senator Gordon M. Johnson (D)
- Assemblywoman Shama Haider (D)
- Assemblywoman Ellen Park (D)

== Electoral history ==
=== Senate ===
37th Legislative District General Election, 2023
Party	Candidate	Votes	%
Democratic	Gordon M. Johnson (incumbent)	27,466	72.1
Republican	Dierdre G. Paul	10,610	27.9
Total votes		38,076	100.0
Democratic hold			

37th Legislative District general election, 2021
Party	Candidate	Votes	%
Democratic	Gordon M. Johnson	34,410	67.04
Republican	Michael W. Koontz	16,155	31.48
New Directions	Glenn Coley	759	1.48
Total votes		51,324	100.0
Democratic hold			

=== General Assembly ===
37th Legislative District General Election, 2019
Party	Candidate	Votes	%
Democratic	Gordon Johnson (incumbent)	19,602	36.05%
Democratic	Valerie Vainieri Huttle (incumbent)	19,475	35.81%
Republican	Angela Hendricks	7,484	13.76%
Republican	Gino Tessaro	7,333	13.48%
Libertarian	Claudio Belusic	485	0.89%
Total votes		54,090	100%
Democratic hold			

New Jersey General Assembly
Preceded by Ken Zisa	Member of the New Jersey General Assembly from the 37th district 2002–2022; Served alongside: Loretta Weinberg, Valerie Huttle	Succeeded by Shama Haider; Ellen Park
Preceded by Jerry Green	Speaker pro tempore of the New Jersey General Assembly; 2018–2022	Succeeded by Benjie E. Wimberly
New Jersey Senate
Preceded by Loretta Weinberg	Member of the New Jersey Senate from the 37th district 2022–present	Incumbent
