= New Jersey's 37th legislative district =

American legislative district

- Senator: Gordon M. Johnson (D)
- Assembly members: Shama Haider (D); Ellen Park (D)
- Registration: 47.8% Democratic; 15.3% Republican; 35.9% unaffiliated
- Demographics: 38.1% White; 13.3% Black/African American; 0.7% Native American; 24.9% Asian; 0.0% Hawaiian/Pacific Islander; 13.0% Other race; 10.1% Two or more races; 24.5% Hispanic
- Population: 231,985
- Voting-age population: 184,858
- Registered voters: 157,713

New Jersey's 37th legislative district is one of 40 in the state, covering the Bergen County municipalities of Bogota, Englewood, Englewood Cliffs, Fort Lee, Hackensack, Leonia, Palisades Park, Ridgefield Park, Teaneck and Tenafly.

== Demographic characteristics ==
As of the 2020 United States census, the district had a population of 231,985, of whom 184,858 (79.7%) were of voting age. The racial makeup of the district was 88,331 (38.1%) White, 30,788 (13.3%) African American, 1,547 (0.7%) Native American, 57,714 (24.9%) Asian, 82 (0.0%) Pacific Islander, 30,166 (13.0%) from some other race, and 23,357 (10.1%) from two or more races. Hispanic or Latino of any race were 56,951 (24.5%) of the population.

The district had 158,787 registered voters as of February 4, 2025, of whom 75,885 (47.8%) were registered as Democrats, 56,995 (35.9%) were registered as unaffiliated, 24,356 (15.3%) were registered as Republicans, and 1,551 (1.0%) were registered to other parties.

African-American residents account for 16.6% of the district's population, mostly in Englewood, Hackensack, and Teaneck. The 37th has the fourth-highest percentage of Asian residents of all districts statewide, accounting for 13.4% of the population.

== Political representation ==
For the 2026–2027 session, the 37th legislative district of the New Jersey Legislature is represented in the New Jersey Senate by Gordon M. Johnson (D, Englewood) and in the General Assembly by Shama Haider (D, Tenafly) and Ellen Park (D, Englewood Cliffs).

The legislative district overlaps with New Jersey's 5th congressional district.

== Apportionment history ==
The 37th district was created in 1973 along with the 40-district statewide legislative map. Some municipalities in the district in the 1970s included Bergenfield, Edgewater, Englewood, Fort Lee, Teaneck, and Tenafly. After the 1981 redistricting, the only change made to the district was the addition of Fairview. In the 1991 redistricting, some of the towns at the southern end of the district as well as Tenafly and Englewood Cliffs were shifted to other districts while it expanded west to Ridgefield Park, Bogota, Hackensack, and Maywood. Changes made as a result of the 2001 redistricting including the reinstatement of Palisades Park, Tenafly, and Englewood Cliffs and the addition of Rochelle Park but Fort Lee was removed from the district at this time.

In the 2011 apportionment following the 2010 census, Bergenfield, Maywood, and Rochelle Park (to the 38th district), Ridgefield Park (to the 36th district) were removed and Alpine, Cresskill, Fort Lee, Northvale and Rockleigh were added.

As of 2023, registered Democrats outnumber Republicans by a better than 3-1 ratio in the district. The 37th has never elected any legislators other than Democrats; one of only nine districts statewide to have only sent members of one political party to Trenton.

Loretta Weinberg was chosen by Democratic committee members in March 1992 to fill the seat vacated in the Assembly by D. Bennett Mazur, who had resigned due to illness.

In February 1993, Byron Baer announced that he would run for the seat in the New Jersey State Senate being vacated by Matthew Feldman. Together with Assembly running mates Weinberg and Ken Zisa, who was on the ballot for Baer's former Assembly seat, Baer won election to the Senate.

The Bergen County Democratic Organization caucused in September 2005, to select a candidate to replace Baer in the Senate who resigned on September 8, 2005 due to health issues. In balloting to replace Baer on an interim basis, Weinberg lost by a 114-110 margin to Zisa. In a separate vote, by a 112-111 margin, Zisa was selected over Weinberg to be the party's candidate on the November ballot. Weinberg filed suit to challenger the exclusion of five ballots and in October 2005 a ruling in Weinberg's favor was issued, giving Weinberg the interim position and the ballot post. With Weinberg's victory, Bergen County Freeholder Valerie Huttle and Englewood Mayor Michael Wildes both announced their candidacy for Weinberg's Assembly seat, with Huttle outpolling Wildes in another special convention by a 121-96 margin.

== Election history ==
Senators and Assembly members elected from the district are as follows:

Session	Senate	General Assembly	
1974–1975	Matthew Feldman (D)	Albert Burstein (D)	Byron Baer (D)
1976–1977	Matthew Feldman (D)	Albert Burstein (D)	Byron Baer (D)
1978–1979	Matthew Feldman (D)	Albert Burstein (D)	Byron Baer (D)
1980–1981	Matthew Feldman (D)	Albert Burstein (D)	Byron Baer (D)
1982–1983	Matthew Feldman (D)	D. Bennett Mazur (D)	Byron Baer (D)
1984–1985	Matthew Feldman (D)	D. Bennett Mazur (D)	Byron Baer (D)
1986–1987	Matthew Feldman (D)	D. Bennett Mazur (D)	Byron Baer (D)
1988–1989	Matthew Feldman (D)	D. Bennett Mazur (D)	Byron Baer (D)
1990–1991	Matthew Feldman (D)	D. Bennett Mazur (D)	Byron Baer (D)
1992–1993	Matthew Feldman (D)	D. Bennett Mazur (D) (Note: Resigned from the Assembly on February 24, 1992)	Byron Baer (D)
1992–1993	Matthew Feldman (D)	Loretta Weinberg (D) (Note: Appointed to the Assembly on March 16, 1992, won November 1992 special election to complete the unexpired term)	Byron Baer (D)
1994–1995	Byron Baer (D)	Loretta Weinberg (D)	Ken Zisa (D)
1996–1997	Byron Baer (D)	Loretta Weinberg (D)	Ken Zisa (D)
1998–1999	Byron Baer (D)	Loretta Weinberg (D)	Ken Zisa (D)
2000–2001	Byron Baer (D)	Loretta Weinberg (D)	Ken Zisa (D)
2002–2003	Byron Baer (D)	Loretta Weinberg (D)	Gordon M. Johnson (D)
2004–2005	Byron Baer (D) (Note: Resigned September 8, 2005 due to health issues)	Loretta Weinberg (D) (Note: Won November 2005 special election to complete the term of Baer, sworn in on November 10, 2005)	Gordon M. Johnson (D)
2004–2005	Loretta Weinberg (D)	Seat vacant	Gordon M. Johnson (D)
2006–2007	Loretta Weinberg (D)	Valerie Huttle (D)	Gordon M. Johnson (D)
2008–2009	Loretta Weinberg (D)	Valerie Huttle (D)	Gordon M. Johnson (D)
2010–2011	Loretta Weinberg (D)	Valerie Huttle (D)	Gordon M. Johnson (D)
2012–2013	Loretta Weinberg (D)	Valerie Huttle (D)	Gordon M. Johnson (D)
2014–2015	Loretta Weinberg (D)	Valerie Huttle (D)	Gordon M. Johnson (D)
2016–2017	Loretta Weinberg (D)	Valerie Huttle (D)	Gordon M. Johnson (D)
2018–2019	Loretta Weinberg (D)	Valerie Huttle (D)	Gordon M. Johnson (D)
2020–2021	Loretta Weinberg (D)	Valerie Huttle (D)	Gordon M. Johnson (D)
2022–2023	Gordon M. Johnson (D)	Shama Haider (D)	Ellen Park (D)
2024–2025	Gordon M. Johnson (D)	Shama Haider (D)	Ellen Park (D)
2026–2027	Gordon M. Johnson (D)	Shama Haider (D)	Ellen Park (D)

== Election results ==
=== Senate ===
2021 New Jersey general election
Party	Candidate	Votes	%	±%
Democratic	Gordon M. Johnson	34,410	67.0	▼8.4
Republican	Michael W. Koontz	16,155	31.5	▲6.9
New Directions	Glenn Coley	759	1.5	N/A
Total votes		51,324	100.0	

New Jersey general election, 2017
Party	Candidate	Votes	%	±%
Democratic	Loretta Weinberg	33,017	75.4	▲6.9
Republican	Modesto Romero	10,788	24.6	▼6.9
Total votes		43,805	100.0	

New Jersey general election, 2013
Party	Candidate	Votes	%	±%
Democratic	Loretta Weinberg	28,321	68.5	▼1.4
Republican	Paul A. Duggan	13,038	31.5	▲1.4
Total votes		41,359	100.0	

2011 New Jersey general election
Party	Candidate	Votes	%
Democratic	Loretta Weinberg	23,141	69.9
Republican	Robert S. Lebovics	9,980	30.1
Total votes		33,121	100.0

2007 New Jersey general election
Party	Candidate	Votes	%	±%
Democratic	Loretta Weinberg	24,118	75.3	▲2.3
Republican	Clara S. Nibot	7,924	24.7	▼2.3
Total votes		32,042	100.0	

Special election, November 8, 2005
Party	Candidate	Votes	%	±%
Democratic	Loretta Weinberg	37,677	73.0	▲11.1
Republican	Robert S. Lebovics	13,942	27.0	▼11.1
Total votes		51,619	100.0	

2003 New Jersey general election
Party	Candidate	Votes	%	±%
Democratic	Byron M. Baer	22,543	61.9	▼4.5
Republican	Barry S. Honig	13,860	38.1	▲4.5
Total votes		36,403	100.0	

2001 New Jersey general election
Party	Candidate	Votes	%
Democratic	Byron M. Baer	33,650	66.4
Republican	Jonathan L. Bender	17,037	33.6
Total votes		50,687	100.0

1997 New Jersey general election
Party	Candidate	Votes	%	±%
Democratic	Byron M. Baer	30,844	59.0	▼1.5
Republican	Steven M. Lonegan	20,543	39.3	▲1.7
Natural Law	Helen Hamilton	855	1.6	N/A
Total votes		52,242	100.0	

1993 New Jersey general election
Party	Candidate	Votes	%	±%
Democratic	Byron M. Baer	35,941	60.5	▲6.9
Republican	Mauro A. Mecca, M.D.	22,368	37.6	▼8.8
Conservative	Joe Marino	1,107	1.9	N/A
Total votes		59,416	100.0	

1991 New Jersey general election
Party	Candidate	Votes	%
Democratic	Matthew Feldman	24,309	53.6
Republican	Todd Caliguire	21,045	46.4
Total votes		45,354	100.0

1987 New Jersey general election
Party	Candidate	Votes	%	±%
Democratic	Matthew Feldman	31,342	66.6	▲2.3
Republican	Shel Haas	15,731	33.4	▼2.3
Total votes		47,073	100.0	

1983 New Jersey general election
Party	Candidate	Votes	%	±%
Democratic	Matthew Feldman	32,645	64.3	▲2.6
Republican	Michael L. Kingman	18,143	35.7	▼2.6
Total votes		50,788	100.0	

1981 New Jersey general election
Party	Candidate	Votes	%
Democratic	Matthew Feldman	39,299	61.7
Republican	Barbara L. deMare	24,416	38.3
Total votes		63,715	100.0

1977 New Jersey general election
Party	Candidate	Votes	%	±%
Democratic	Matthew Feldman	31,945	59.0	▲0.4
Republican	William C. Clark	21,723	40.1	▼0.7
Communist	Magnus Nelson	492	0.9	N/A
Total votes		54,160	100.0	

1973 New Jersey general election
Party	Candidate	Votes	%
Democratic	Matthew Feldman	36,690	58.6
Republican	Joseph C. Woodcock, Jr.	25,524	40.8
Socialist Labor	Armand Milletari	373	0.6
Total votes		62,587	100.0

=== General Assembly ===
2021 New Jersey general election
Party	Candidate	Votes	%	±%
Democratic	Shama A. Haider	32,797	33.0	▼2.7
Democratic	Ellen J. Park	33,532	33.8	▼2.1
Republican	Edward P. Durfee Jr.	16,193	16.3	▲2.4
Republican	Perley V. Patrick	15,863	16.0	▲2.3
Children&Seniors First	Natacha M. Pannell	923	0.9	N/A
Total votes		99,308	100.0	

2019 New Jersey general election
Party	Candidate	Votes	%	±%
Democratic	Gordon M. Johnson	22,961	35.9	▼1.4
Democratic	Valerie Vainieri Huttle	22,852	35.7	▼1.7
Republican	Angela T. Hendricks	8,893	13.9	▲1.5
Republican	Gino Tessaro	8,752	13.7	▲1.3
Libertarian	Claudio Belusic	568	0.9	▲0.4
Total votes		64,026	100.0	

New Jersey general election, 2017
Party	Candidate	Votes	%	±%
Democratic	Valerie Vainieri Huttle	31,855	37.4	▲1.5
Democratic	Gordon M. Johnson	31,798	37.3	▲1.5
Republican	Gino P. Tessaro	10,610	12.4	▼1.5
Republican	Angela Hendricks	10,576	12.4	▼2.0
Libertarian	Claudio I. Belusic	392	0.5	N/A
Total votes		85,231	100.0	

New Jersey general election, 2015
Party	Candidate	Votes	%	±%
Democratic	Valerie Vainieri Huttle	18,930	35.9	▲2.4
Democratic	Gordon M. Johnson	18,869	35.8	▲2.5
Republican	Joseph M. Fiscella	7,598	14.4	▼2.0
Republican	Gino P. Tessaro	7,338	13.9	▼2.9
Total votes		52,735	100.0	

New Jersey general election, 2013
Party	Candidate	Votes	%	±%
Democratic	Valerie Vainieri Huttle	26,581	33.5	▼0.6
Democratic	Gordon M. Johnson	26,373	33.3	▼0.5
Republican	Gino Tessaro	13,338	16.8	▲1.1
Republican	Deirdre G Paul	12,988	16.4	▲1.0
Total votes		79,280	100.0	

New Jersey general election, 2011
Party	Candidate	Votes	%
Democratic	Valerie Vainieri Huttle	22,062	34.1
Democratic	Gordon M. Johnson	21,839	33.8
Republican	Keith Jensen	10,150	15.7
Republican	Gregory John Aslanian	9,929	15.4
Libertarian	Julian Heicklen	675	1.0
Total votes		64,655	100.0

New Jersey general election, 2009
Party	Candidate	Votes	%	±%
Democratic	Gordon M. Johnson	32,845	33.8	▼0.6
Democratic	Valerie Vainieri Huttle	32,440	33.4	▼3.0
Republican	Barry Bellin	16,266	16.7	▲2.0
Republican	Wojciech Siemaszkiewicz	15,635	16.1	▲1.6
Total votes		97,186	100.0	

New Jersey general election, 2007
Party	Candidate	Votes	%	±%
Democratic	Valerie Vainieri Huttle	22,488	36.4	▲1.2
Democratic	Gordon M. Johnson	21,228	34.4	▼1.1
Republican	Frank J. Cifarelli	9,051	14.7	▲0.2
Republican	Wojciech J. Siemaszkiewicz	8,932	14.5	▲0.6
Total votes		61,699	100.0	

New Jersey general election, 2005
Party	Candidate	Votes	%	±%
Democratic	Gordon M. Johnson	35,554	35.5	▲4.0
Democratic	Valerie Vainieri Huttle	35,246	35.2	▲2.3
Republican	Frank J. Cifarelli	14,496	14.5	▼2.0
Republican	Norman Gorlyn	13,932	13.9	▼2.4
Conservative	Thomas A. Phelan	787	0.8	N/A
Total votes		100,015	100.0	

New Jersey general election, 2003
Party	Candidate	Votes	%	±%
Democratic	Loretta Weinberg	23,516	32.9	▼1.5
Democratic	Gordon M. Johnson	22,492	31.5	▼1.1
Republican	John M. Long	11,778	16.5	▼0.2
Republican	Sanford Steinfeld	11,690	16.3	▲0.1
Green	Patricia Alessandrini	1,063	1.5	N/A
Green	Ruth Bauer Neustadter	974	1.4	N/A
Total votes		71,513	100.0	

New Jersey general election, 2001
Party	Candidate	Votes	%
Democratic	Loretta Weinberg	34,443	34.4
Democratic	Gordon M. Johnson	32,687	32.6
Republican	Thomas F. Gaffney, Jr.	16,737	16.7
Republican	Sandi Cortazzo	16,270	16.2
Total votes		100,137	100.0

New Jersey general election, 1999
Party	Candidate	Votes	%	±%
Democratic	Loretta Weinberg	19,694	35.2	▲2.2
Democratic	Ken Zisa	18,971	33.9	▲2.6
Republican	Richard J. Bohan, Sr.	8,817	15.7	▼1.6
Republican	Sharon Hes	8,526	15.2	▼1.5
Total votes		56,008	100.0	

New Jersey general election, 1997
Party	Candidate	Votes	%	±%
Democratic	Loretta Weinberg	33,677	33.0	▲2.3
Democratic	Ken Zisa	31,961	31.3	▲3.8
Republican	Bette O’Keefe	17,633	17.3	▼2.3
Republican	John Abraham	17,045	16.7	▼2.5
Conservative	BettyJean Downing	975	1.0	▼0.5
Conservative	Gregory A. Potter	803	0.8	▼0.8
Total votes		102,094	100.0	

New Jersey general election, 1995
Party	Candidate	Votes	%	±%
Democratic	Loretta Weinberg	22,106	30.7	▲0.8
Democratic	Ken Zisa	19,789	27.5	▼1.8
Republican	John Mc Cann	14,149	19.6	▼1.2
Republican	Howard Williams	13,798	19.2	▼0.7
Conservative	Richard P. O’Neil	1,148	1.6	N/A
Conservative	Bettyjean Downing	1,050	1.5	N/A
Total votes		72,040	100.0	

New Jersey general election, 1993
Party	Candidate	Votes	%	±%
Democratic	Loretta Weinberg	33,876	29.9	▲3.8
Democratic	Ken Zisa	33,188	29.3	▲3.4
Republican	John Abraham	23,562	20.8	▼2.1
Republican	David Grobow Hahn	22,550	19.9	▼2.3
Total votes		113,176	100.0	

Special election, November 3, 1992
Party	Candidate	Votes	%
Democratic	Loretta Weinberg	46,356	60.9
Republican	John R. Smith	29,824	39.1
Total votes		76,180	100.0

1991 New Jersey general election
Party	Candidate	Votes	%
Democratic	D. Bennett Mazur	23,456	26.1
Democratic	Byron Baer	23,308	25.9
Republican	John R. Smith	20,601	22.9
Republican	Harvey Salb	19,955	22.2
Independent Party	Joseph Marino	1,417	1.6
Independent Party	John Gramuglia	1,270	1.4
Total votes		90,007	100.0

1989 New Jersey general election
Party	Candidate	Votes	%	±%
Democratic	Byron Baer	36,657	32.8	▲1.6
Democratic	D. Bennett Mazur	35,997	32.2	▲0.8
Republican	Anthony J. Cassano	19,552	17.5	▼1.4
Republican	Arthur V. Gallagher	19,462	17.4	▼1.0
Total votes		111,668	100.0	

1987 New Jersey general election
Party	Candidate	Votes	%	±%
Democratic	D. Bennett Mazur	28,801	31.4	▲4.4
Democratic	Byron Baer	28,575	31.2	▲4.3
Republican	Anthony J. Cassano	17,341	18.9	▼5.0
Republican	Barry N. Frank	16,895	18.4	▼3.7
Total votes		91,612	100.0	

1985 New Jersey general election
Party	Candidate	Votes	%	±%
Democratic	D. Bennett Mazur	27,376	27.0	▼3.9
Democratic	Byron Baer	27,335	26.9	▼4.5
Republican	Nicholas Corbiscello	24,300	23.9	▲5.0
Republican	Martin Katz	22,453	22.1	▲3.4
Total votes		101,464	100.0	

New Jersey general election, 1983
Party	Candidate	Votes	%	±%
Democratic	Byron Baer	31,216	31.4	▲2.0
Democratic	D. Bennett Mazur	30,673	30.9	▲1.4
Republican	Eugene Babbini	18,794	18.9	▼1.8
Republican	Jacqueline Stovall	18,597	18.7	▼1.2
Total votes		99,280	100.0	

New Jersey general election, 1981
Party	Candidate	Votes	%
Democratic	D. Bennett Mazur	36,432	29.5
Democratic	Byron M. Baer	36,304	29.4
Republican	Bart Talamini	25,496	20.7
Republican	David Baslow	24,603	19.9
Stop Transit Increases	Joseph J. Marion	540	0.4
Total votes		123,375	100.0

New Jersey general election, 1979
Party	Candidate	Votes	%	±%
Democratic	Albert Burstein	28,727	30.0	▼1.3
Democratic	Byron M. Baer	28,225	29.5	▼2.0
Republican	Bradford Menkes	19,432	20.3	▲1.9
Republican	Joan Van Alstyne Johnson	19,236	20.1	▲2.1
Total votes		95,620	100.0	

New Jersey general election, 1977
Party	Candidate	Votes	%	±%
Democratic	Byron M. Baer	33,063	31.5	▲3.6
Democratic	Albert Burstein	32,848	31.3	▲4.1
Republican	Bruce O. Baker	19,282	18.4	▼3.3
Republican	Paul W. Herbst	18,844	18.0	▼2.7
Libertarian	Kenneth A. Miller	472	0.4	▼0.9
Libertarian	Charles H. Irwin	395	0.4	N/A
Total votes		104,904	100.0	

New Jersey general election, 1975
Party	Candidate	Votes	%	±%
Democratic	Byron M. Baer	30,796	27.9	▼4.1
Democratic	Albert Burstein	29,995	27.2	▼4.1
Republican	Dennis M. Meehan	23,960	21.7	▲2.2
Republican	Jerry J. Hersch	22,859	20.7	▲3.4
Libertarian	Daniel J. Piro	1,426	1.3	N/A
Socialist Labor	Armand Milletari	703	0.6	N/A
"For Go-d's Sake"	Nana De Dia	519	0.5	N/A
Total votes		110,258	100.0	

New Jersey general election, 1973
Party	Candidate	Votes	%
Democratic	Byron M. Baer	38,387	32.0
Democratic	Albert Burstein	37,520	31.3
Republican	Charles J. O’Dowd, Jr.	23,398	19.5
Republican	Roger M. Kahn	20,742	17.3
Total votes		120,047	100.0
