= D. Bennett Mazur =

American politician (1924–1994)

David Bennett Mazur

Member of the New Jersey General Assembly from the 37th district
- In office January 12, 1982 – February 24, 1992 Serving with Byron Baer
- Preceded by: Albert Burstein
- Succeeded by: Loretta Weinberg

Personal details
- Born: December 14, 1924 Manhattan, New York, U.S.
- Died: October 11, 1994 (aged 69) Teaneck, New Jersey, U.S.
- Party: Democratic
- Children: 4
- Education: Lafayette College (BA); Fairleigh Dickinson University (MA); Rutgers University–New Brunswick (PhD)
- Occupation: Legislator

David Bennett Mazur (December 14, 1924 – October 11, 1994) was an American politician and academic who served six terms in the New Jersey General Assembly, where he represented the 37th Legislative District from 1982 to 1992. Mazur also spent two decades as a professor at Ramapo College.

== Early life and education ==
Born in Manhattan, New York City, Mazur served in the United States Army in Europe during World War II, where he earned a Bronze Star Medal as an infantryman, in addition to three Purple Hearts. He earned his undergraduate degree with a major in economics from Lafayette College, followed by a Master of Business Administration from Fairleigh Dickinson University with a major in economics and finance. He earned a Ph.D. from Rutgers University–New Brunswick in urban planning and public policy formation.

== Career ==
At the time he earned his Ph.D., Mazur was employed by the New York Daily Mirror. Mazur was a longtime professor at Ramapo College in Mahwah, where he taught planning and public administration.

Mazur moved to Fort Lee, New Jersey after completing his military service, where he became a tenant activist. He was first elected to the Bergen County Board of Chosen Freeholders in 1964, serving in office from 1965 to 1967 and again from 1975 to 1980. In 1966, Mayor of New York City John Lindsay named Mazur to serve on the Metropolitan Regional Council, where he was chosen to head the organization's committee on the future of the Tri-State region. As Freeholder in 1977, Mazur led efforts to save the Campbell-Christie House, an historic home that had been slated for demolition. With a $150,000 grant, the 200-year-old home was moved two miles from New Milford to a site at New Bridge Landing in River Edge.

He was elected to the Assembly in 1981, where legislation he proposed in 1984 banned the use of leg hold traps by hunters, created the state's 911 system and banned discrimination on the basis of sexual orientation. He served on the Hudson River Waterfront Planning and Study Commission, the New Jersey Railroad and Transportation Study Commission and the Tri-State Regional Planning Commission.

Mazur was elected to serve a sixth term in office in November 1991, but was forced to resign on February 24, 1992, due to a stroke he suffered on Election Day. Loretta Weinberg was chosen by Democratic committee members in March 1992 to fill the seat he vacated in the Assembly and was sworn into office in later that month.

== Personal life ==
Mazur married the Betty (née Greene) of the Bronx on September 3, 1951.

Mazur died at age 69 on October 11, 1994, at Holy Name Hospital in Teaneck, New Jersey due to complications of the stroke. He had four children.
