= Ken Zisa =

American politician (born 1954)

Member of the New Jersey General Assembly from the 37th district
- In office January 11, 1994 – January 8, 2002 Serving with Loretta Weinberg
- Preceded by: Byron Baer
- Succeeded by: Gordon M. Johnson

Personal details
- Born: January 27, 1954 (age 72) Hackensack, New Jersey, U.S.
- Party: Democratic

Charles "Ken" Zisa (born January 27, 1954) is an American Democratic Party politician, who served as a member of the New Jersey General Assembly from 1994 to 2002, where he represented the 37th Legislative District.

A lifelong resident of Hackensack, New Jersey and graduate of Hackensack High School, Zisa attended the Bergen County Police Academy.

Zisa was elected to the Assembly in 1993, filling the seat that had been occupied by Byron Baer who moved up to the Senate. Zisa gave up his seat in the Assembly to run for Bergen County Sheriff in 2001, losing in the general election to Joel Trella.

Effective June 1, 1995, Hackensack City Manager James Lacava named Zisa as Acting Police Chief, following the planned departure of John Aletta from the position as of that date. Zisa took the oath of office as Police Chief in December 1995. As of 2008, Zisa served as the Hackensack Police Chief until 2010.

After the resignation of State Senator Byron Baer, Zisa announced his pursuit of the seat with the support of local party chief Joe Ferriero, facing off against Assemblywoman Loretta Weinberg. The Bergen County Democratic Organization caucused on September 15, 2005, with Zisa winning by a 114-110 margin to fill the seat on an interim basis and by a 112-111 margin to be the party's candidate on the November ballot. Weinberg pursued a series of legal challenges, claiming that five excluded votes from County Committee members from Tenafly should be counted. After a ruling in Weinberg's favor, the "Tenafly Five" ballots were opened by Judge Peter Doyne on October 5, 2005, and each ballot was cast for Weinberg, thus giving her the slim margin of victory; With these five votes now counted, Weinberg defeated Zisa by one vote in balloting to fill Baer's vacated seat on an interim basis, 115-114, and won the contest for the Democratic ballot spot in November by a total of 116-112.

In 2007, Ferriero endorsed a ticket of Englewood Mayor Michael Wildes, and Cid Wilson and Zisa for Assembly, to face off in a primary challenge against incumbents Weinberg, and her Assembly running mates Valerie Huttle and Gordon M. Johnson. In a deal brokered by Governor of New Jersey Jon Corzine, Ferriero backed off the challenge and announced that he and the county party organization would endorse the three incumbents in the primary.

In January 2008, Zisa announced that he would seek a primary challenge in the 37th District Assembly in 2009, challenging incumbents Valerie Huttle and Gordon M. Johnson.

== Insurance fraud ==
On April 30, 2010, Zisa was arrested for insurance fraud. Three years after being found guilty, Zisa's conviction was overturned in 2019.
