= Shama Haider =

Member of the New Jersey General Assembly

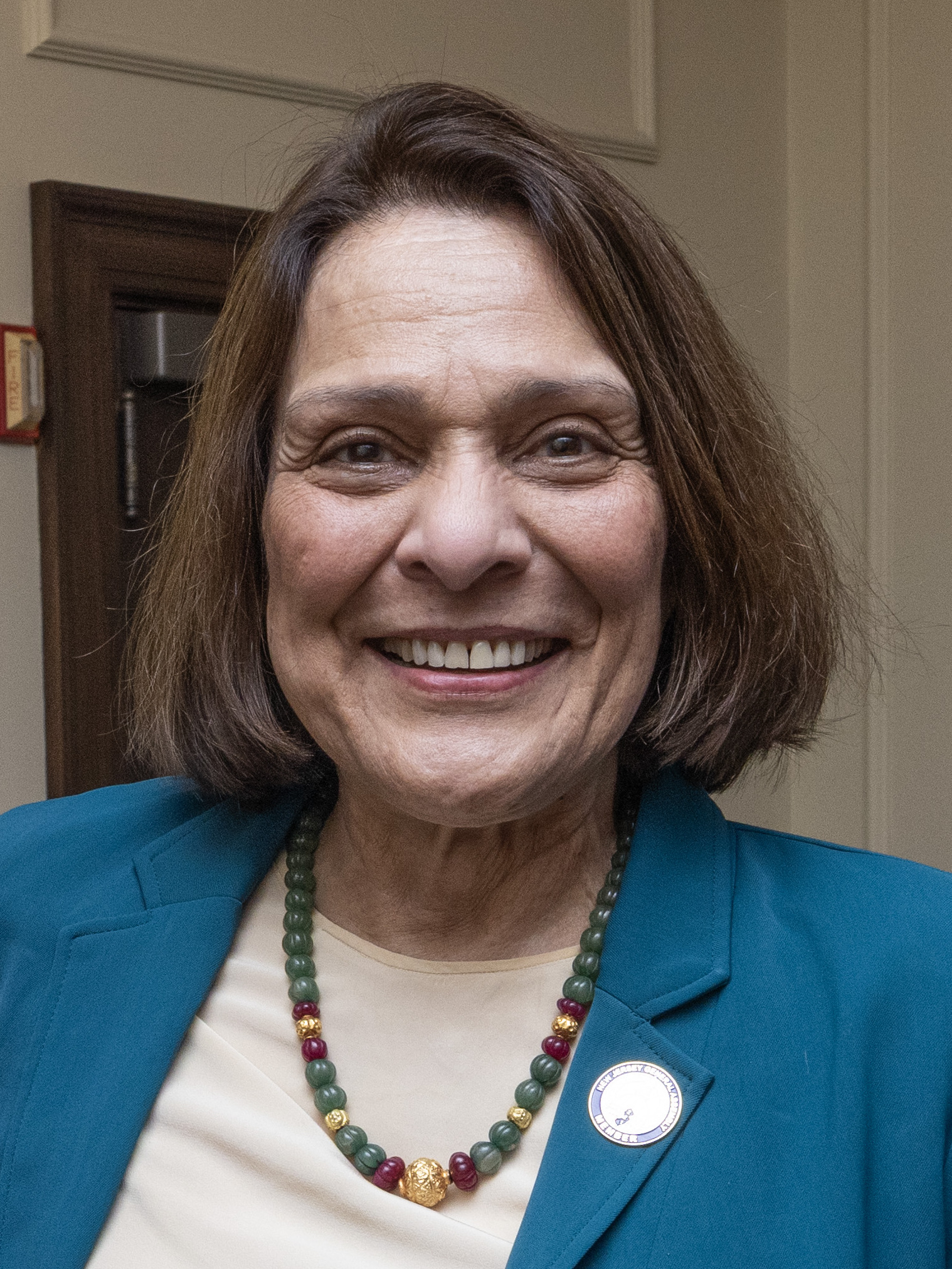
- Haider in 2025

Member of the New Jersey General Assembly from the 37th district
- Incumbent
- Assumed office January 11, 2022 Serving with Ellen Park
- Preceded by: Valerie Huttle; Gordon M. Johnson

Personal details
- Born: December 20, 1948 (age 77) Pakistan
- Party: Democratic
- Website: www.njleg.state.nj.us/legislative-roster/452/assemblywoman-haider

Shama Haider (born December 20, 1948) is a Democratic Party politician who represents the 37th legislative district in the New Jersey General Assembly since taking office on January 11, 2022. Along with Sadaf Jaffer, she is one of the first Muslim women to be elected to the New Jersey Legislature.

== Political career ==
Born and raised in Pakistan, where she attended the University of Punjab, Haider served as Secretary to the First Lady of Pakistan Nusrat Bhutto. Haider emigrated to the United States in 1977. She was elected in both 2001 and 2015 to serve on the Tenafly, New Jersey Borough Council. In the November 2021 general election, she was elected together with her running mates Gordon M. Johnson to the Senate and Ellen Park in the Assembly, making her one of the first two Muslim woman to serve in the state legislature.

She has served in the Assembly since 2024 as Deputy Majority Leader.

=== Committees ===
Committee assignments for the 2024—2025 Legislative Session are:

- Children, Families and Food Security (as chair)
- Appropriations
- Health

=== District 37 ===
Each of the 40 districts in the New Jersey Legislature has one representative in the New Jersey Senate and two members in the New Jersey General Assembly. The representatives from the 37th District for the 2024—2025 Legislative Session are:

- Senator Gordon M. Johnson (D)
- Assemblywoman Shama Haider (D)
- Assemblywoman Ellen Park (D)

== Electoral history ==
37th Legislative District General Election, 2023
| Party | Candidate | Votes | % |
|---|---|---|---|
| Democratic | Ellen J. Park (incumbent) | 26,942 | 36.4 |
| Democratic | Shama A. Haider (incumbent) | 25,943 | 35.0 |
| Republican | Robert Bedoya | 10,673 | 14.4 |
| Republican | Katherine Lebovics | 10,526 | 14.2 |
| Total votes | | 74,084 | 100.0 |
| Democratic hold | | | |
| Democratic hold | | | |

37th legislative district general election, 2021
| Party | Candidate | Votes | % |
|---|---|---|---|
| Democratic | Ellen J. Park | 33,532 | 33.77% |
| Democratic | Shama A. Haider | 32,797 | 33.03% |
| Republican | Edward P. Durfee Jr. | 16,193 | 16.31% |
| Republican | Perley V. Patrick | 15,863 | 15.97% |
| Children&Seniors First | Natacha M. Pannell | 923 | 0.93% |
| Total votes | | 99,308 | 100.0 |
| Democratic hold | | | |
