= Loretta Weinberg =

American politician (born 1935)

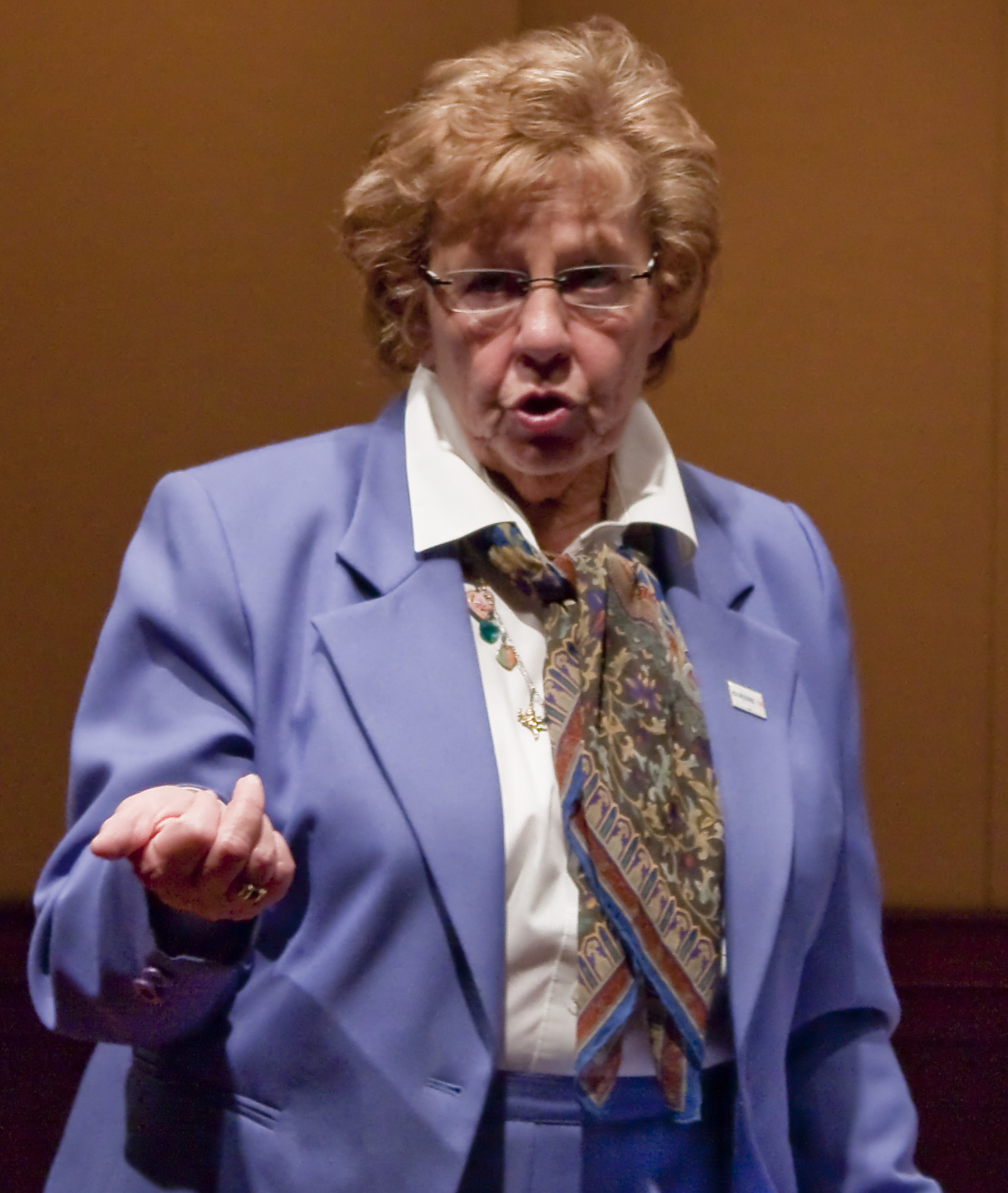

Majority Leader of the New Jersey Senate
- In office January 10, 2012 – January 7, 2022
- Deputy: Paul Sarlo
- Preceded by: Barbara Buono
- Succeeded by: Teresa Ruiz

Member of the New Jersey Senate from the 37th district
- In office November 10, 2005 – January 7, 2022
- Preceded by: Byron Baer
- Succeeded by: Gordon M. Johnson

Member of the New Jersey General Assembly from the 37th district
- In office March 16, 1992 – November 10, 2005
- Preceded by: D. Bennett Mazur
- Succeeded by: Valerie Vainieri Huttle

Personal details
- Born: February 6, 1935 (age 91) New York City, New York, U.S.
- Party: Democratic
- Education: University of California, Berkeley (BA); Fairleigh Dickinson University (MPA)
- Website: State Senate website

Loretta Weinberg (born February 6, 1935) is an American Democratic Party politician, who served as a member of the New Jersey Senate from 2005 until 2022, where she represented the 37th Legislative District. She also served as Senate Majority Leader. Weinberg served in the General Assembly before being selected to replace retiring Senator Byron Baer.

Weinberg was the Democratic nominee for Lieutenant Governor of New Jersey in the 2009 election, having been selected by Governor Jon Corzine as his running mate on July 24. Corzine and Weinberg were defeated by the Republican ticket of Chris Christie and Kim Guadagno on November 3, 2009.

== Biography ==
Weinberg serves on the Senate Health, Human Services and Senior Citizens Committee (as Vice-Chair) and on the State Government Committee (also as Vice-Chair). She is a former member of the Senate Commerce Committee and the Senate Judiciary Committee.

Weinberg was chosen by Democratic committee members in March 1992 to fill the seat vacated in the Assembly by D. Bennett Mazur, who had resigned due to illness. She served in the General Assembly, the lower house of the New Jersey Legislature, until 2005. In the Assembly, Weinberg served as the Majority Conference Leader from 2002 to 2005, Deputy Minority Leader from 1996 to 2001 and Assistant Minority Leader from 1994 to 1995. Weinberg served as the Chairwoman of the Health and Human Services Committee and Vice Chairwoman of the Family, Women, and Children's Services Committee. Additionally, she also served on the New Jersey Historical Commission, Legislative Services Commission and the New Jersey Israel Commission. Some of her past Committee assignments include the Community Services Committee, the Veteran Affairs Committee and, most recently, the Consumer and Regulated Professions Committee.

From 1975 to 1985, she was the Assistant Administrator of Bergen County. She was elected to the Teaneck Township Council in 1990, completing her council term in 1994. Besides her service in the Legislature, Weinberg has also been active in community organizations including the American Red Cross, Shelter Our Sisters, the Bergen Family Center, AARP Teaneck Chapter, New Jersey Network of Women Elected Officials, National Organization of Women Legislators and the National Council of Jewish Women.

Weinberg has been recognized as "Legislator Worker of the Year" by the National Association of Social Workers - New Jersey Chapter, The "Friend of New Jersey's Children Award" by the American Academy of Pediatrics - New Jersey Chapter and the "Legislator of the Year Award" by the New Jersey Center for Outreach and Services for the Autism Community (COSAC). She has been selected by Marquis Who's Who for inclusion in the "Who's Who of American Women List".

Weinberg was born in New York City and graduated from the University of California, Berkeley with a B.A. in History. She has completed all course work for a Master of Public Administration from Fairleigh Dickinson University.

On January 13, 2020, Weinberg announced her retirement from politics in January 2022 when her current term expires.

Weinberg resigned on January 7, 2022, four days before the end of her term, to join a board of directors role at Horizon Blue Cross Blue Shield of New Jersey.

In April 2025, at age 90, Weinberg organized a Hands Off protest at a retirement home in Teaneck.

=== Run for State Senate ===
Weinberg ran for the New Jersey Senate after fellow District 37 legislator Byron Baer resigned from the Senate on September 8, 2005. From the outset of his term, the resignation of the often-ailing Baer had been the subject of much speculation and maneuvering. In a January 7, 2004 article for PoliticsNJ.com, political reporter Steve Kornacki wrote, "Depending on whom you listen to, the 74-year-old Baer will step down sometime between the next few months and January 2008, when his term expires."

Kornacki identified a number of "potential successors" to Baer, including Hackensack Police Chief and former Assemblyman Charles "Ken" Zisa, who had briefly mounted a challenge to Baer's 2003 re-nomination before withdrawing it in what some have said was a deal brokered by Bergen County Democratic Organization Chairman Joe Ferriero; Bergen County Freeholder Valerie Huttle; Englewood Mayor Michael Wildes; and Weinberg. "But," wrote Kornacki, "whether Weinberg, who backed Zisa in his brief bid to topple Baer last year, does want it [the Senate seat] is an open question."

Sixteen months later, that question appeared to have been answered. In a May 3, 2005 PoliticsNJ.com article, Kornacki reported, "Weinberg essentially admitted to striking a deal with Ferriero. She said the chairman agreed to back her for [Assembly] majority leader, while she pledged to support a candidate of his choosing to replace state Senator Byron Barer when the 75-year-old steps down...some say she also had pledged support to Valerie Vainieri Huttle, a freeholder, for the Senate spot."

Following Baer's resignation, Ferriero backed Zisa to fill the vacancy, as expected. Huttle prepared to challenge Zisa for the nomination. Weinberg then let it be known she was interested, and on September 11, 2005, United States Senator Jon Corzine, the Democratic candidate for Governor of New Jersey, endorsed Weinberg for Baer's seat. Huttle bowed out of the race and endorsed Weinberg.

The Bergen County Democratic Organization caucused on September 15, 2005, to select a candidate. In balloting to replace Baer on an interim basis, Weinberg lost by a 114-110 margin to Zisa. In a separate vote, by a 112-111 margin, Zisa was selected over Weinberg to be the party's candidate on the November ballot. Though she congratulated Zisa in remarks made after results were announced at the September 15 caucus, Weinberg stated that inclusion of several uncounted ballots might change the results in her favor.

Weinberg filed a legal challenge to the caucus results to have the unopened ballots included, which she believed were cast for her. On September 20, 2005, New Jersey Superior Court Judge Peter Doyne refused to interfere in what he held was a party matter and upheld the decision of the election mediator, Rep. Steve Rothman, to exclude the five ballots. On September 23, 2005, an Appellate Court panel sent the case back to Judge Doyne, ruling that he did have the authority to address a party issue and that the five uncounted ballots cast by Tenafly Democratic Committee members could be counted irrespective of the failure to file their names within the specified 30-day window. Zisa announced on September 26, 2005, that he would appeal the Appellate panel's decision to the New Jersey Supreme Court. Judge Doyne's hearing on September 28 to readdress the issues was underway when the Supreme Court issued a ruling upholding the Appellate Court's decision and affirming that the 30-day rule for submission of new County Committee members could not be enforced. Judge Doyne decided on October 3, 2005, in Weinberg's favor, ruling that ballots from the "Tenafly Five" should be counted.

On October 5, 2005, the New Jersey Supreme Court ruled that it would not hear an appeal from Ken Zisa and the Bergen County Democratic Organization. The "Tenafly Five" ballots were opened by Judge Peter Doyne, and each ballot was cast for Loretta Weinberg, thus giving her the slim margin of victory. Weinberg defeated Zisa by one vote in balloting to fill Baer's vacated seat on an interim basis, 115–114, and won the contest for the Democratic ballot spot in November, by a total of 116–112.

With Weinberg's victory, Bergen County Freeholder Valerie Huttle and Englewood Mayor Michael Wildes both announced their candidacy for Weinberg's Assembly seat. The choice was decided by yet another special convention of the Bergen County Democratic Committee on October 6, 2005, with Huttle outpolling Wildes 121–96. On Election Day, November 8, 2005, Huttle won the Assembly seat.

=== 2007 primary challenge ===
In 2007, Ferriero endorsed a ticket of Englewood Mayor Michael Wildes, and Cid Wilson and Ken Zisa for Assembly, to face off in a primary challenge against incumbents Weinberg, and her Assembly running mates Valerie Huttle and Gordon M. Johnson. In a deal brokered by Governor of New Jersey Jon Corzine, Ferriero backed off the challenge and announced that he and the county party organization would endorse the three incumbents in the primary.

=== Fort Lee lane closure scandal ===
Weinberg played a major role in revealing the Fort Lee lane closure scandal. After reading about traffic jams in The Record, Weinberg began attending public meetings of the Port Authority of New York and New Jersey. Weinberg convinced fellow state legislator John Wisniewski to take an interest in the case. Wisniewski would subpoena Port Authority officials, which eventually led to the lane closures becoming a major controversy.

=== District 37 ===
Each of the forty districts in the New Jersey Legislature has one representative in the New Jersey Senate and two members in the New Jersey General Assembly. The other representatives from the 37th district for the 2018-2019 Legislative Session are:

- Assemblywoman Valerie Huttle
- Assemblyman Gordon M. Johnson

=== Legislation ===
Weinberg was a lead advocate of the 2002 New Jersey Childproof Handgun Law, which would restrict the sale of handguns in NJ to smart guns that "can only be fired by an authorized or recognized user" three years after the technology became generally available.

== Bernard Madoff investment loss ==
Weinberg lost $1.3 million in a retirement fund that had been invested through a Beverly Hills, California financial planner with Bernard Madoff, without her knowledge. Other family members had also invested money with the same advisor. In an interview with The New York Times Weinberg stated that she did not expect to recoup her loss but she was "determined not to make this the centerpiece of my life", stating that she would "have to budget myself very carefully over the next several years".

== 2009 lieutenant governor campaign ==
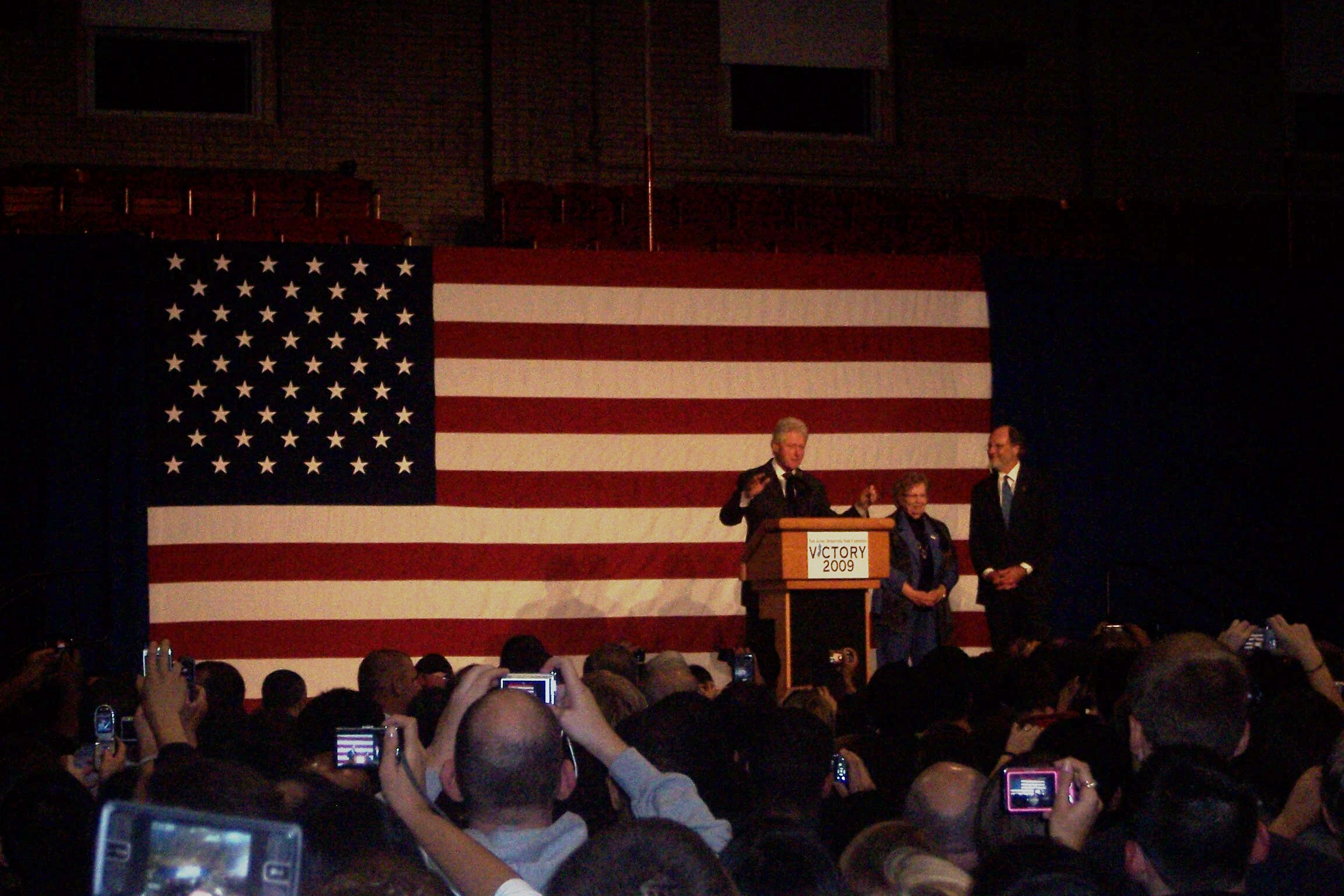
Weinberg with Corzine and President Bill Clinton at an October 20, 2009 campaign rally at Rutgers University's College Avenue Gymnasium.

Weinberg was selected as the Democratic candidate for Lieutenant Governor of New Jersey in the 2009 election by Governor Jon Corzine on July 24. She was attempting to become the state's first Lieutenant Governor.

In August during the campaign, following Republican gubernatorial candidate Chris Christie's acknowledgment that he had loaned $46,000 to First Assistant U.S. Attorney for New Jersey Michele Brown two years prior, while serving as her superior as the state's U.S. attorney, and that he had failed to report the loan on either his income tax returns or his mandatory financial disclosure report to the New Jersey Election Law Enforcement Commission, Weinberg called on Brown to recuse herself from the task of retrieving U.S. Attorney's Office records requested by the Corzine campaign under the Freedom of Information Act.

Weinberg engaged in a debate between herself and the other two major candidates for lieutenant governor, Kim Guadagno and Frank Esposito, at Monmouth University on October 8. Corzine and Weinberg were defeated by Chris Christie on November 3, 2009.

== Election history ==
New Jersey State Senate elections, 2013
Party	Candidate	Votes	%
Democratic	Loretta Weinberg (incumbent)	28,321	68.5
Republican	Paul A. Duggen	13,038	31.5
Democratic hold			

New Jersey State Senate elections, 2011
Party	Candidate	Votes	%
Democratic	Loretta Weinberg (incumbent)	23,141	69.0
Republican	Robert S. Lebovics	9,980	30.1
Democratic hold			

New Jersey State Senate elections, 2007
Party	Candidate	Votes	%
Democratic	Loretta Weinberg (incumbent)	24,118	75.3
Republican	Clara S. Nibot	7,924	24.7
Democratic hold			

New Jersey General Assembly
Preceded by D. Bennett Mazur	Member of the New Jersey General Assembly from the 37th district 1992–2005; Served alongside: Byron Baer, Ken Zisa, Gordon M. Johnson	Succeeded by Valerie Huttle
New Jersey Senate
Preceded by Byron Baer	Member of the New Jersey Senate from the 37th district 2005–2022	Succeeded by Gordon M. Johnson
Preceded by Barbara Buono	Majority Leader of the New Jersey Senate; 2012–2022	Succeeded by Teresa Ruiz
Party political offices
First	Democratic nominee for Lieutenant Governor of New Jersey; 2009	Succeeded by Milly Silva
