= Albert Burstein =

American politician (1922–2018)

Member of the New Jersey General Assembly
- In office January 11, 1972 – January 12, 1982 Serving with Byron Baer
- Preceded by: Thomas Costa
- Succeeded by: D. Bennett Mazur
- Constituency: District 13B (1972–1974); 37th District (1974–1982)

Personal details
- Born: November 22, 1922 Jersey City, New Jersey
- Died: December 27, 2018 (aged 96) Tenafly, New Jersey
- Party: Democratic

Albert Burstein (November 22, 1922 – December 27, 2018) was an American Democratic Party politician, who served five terms in the New Jersey General Assembly, where he represented the District 13B in his first term then from the 37th Legislative District for the next four. He served as Majority Leader of the Assembly. In June 2004, Burstein was appointed to serve on the New Jersey Election Law Enforcement Commission.

Burstein was born to Julius and Hannah Burstein on November 22, 1922, in Jersey City, New Jersey, where he graduated from Henry Snyder High School. He went on to receive his undergraduate degree from Columbia College, Columbia University and his law degree from Columbia Law School. A resident of Tenafly, New Jersey, Burstein was a partner in the law firm of Herten, Burstein, Sheridan, Cevasco, Bottinelli, Litt, & Harz, L.L.C. He served as chair of the New Jersey State Commission of Investigation Review Committee, chair of the New Jersey Law Revision Commission, chair of the Bergen County IIB South District Ethics Committee as well as serving as a member of the New Jersey Law Journal editorial board.

In the Assembly, Burstein sponsored legislation that included a major revision to New Jersey's election law, as well as the Gubernatorial Public Financing Law of 1974. Burstein served as chair of the Education Committee, and as a member of the Election Law Revision Committee, the Capital Budgeting and Planning Commission, and the Public Employees Relations Study Commission.

In what The New York Times described as a "surprising victory", Nicholas S. Mastorelli of Secaucus, New Jersey, won the Democratic primary in June 1978 for the nomination to run for the house seat of Harold C. Hollenbeck in New Jersey's 9th congressional district. While Burstein won in the Bergen County area, Mastorelli's edge came from large margins in the Hudson County, New Jersey, portion of the district.

Burstein was the recipient of numerous awards from his more than 60-year career as a practicing attorney in N.J., including "Lawyer of the Year" from the Committee on Professionalism in 1999 and the Daniel J. O'Hern Professional Award from the New Jersey Bar Association in 2006.

On Veterans Day, November 11, 2010, Burstein received the Chevalier of the Legion of Honor for his bravery on the battlefield as a soldier fighting the Germans on French territory during World War II. Burstein was also the recipient of the Bronze Star Medal for his service in World War II. He died on December 27, 2018, at the age of 96. He was Jewish.
