= Princeton Community Television =

Princeton Community Television (also known as Princeton TV and TV30) is a Public, educational, and government access (PEG) cable TV channels in Princeton, New Jersey. The station provides camera equipment, TV studios and training that allow the community to create television shows, films, and other projects. The station is carried on Comcast channel 30 and Verizon FIOS channel 45 in the Princeton, New Jersey area. Princeton Community Television is one of the largest public producers of original content in New Jersey.

== History ==
Princeton Community Television (TV30) is a Public Access cable television station, The station was created by the Borough and Township of Princeton in 1995, and occupied "two cramped, very small rooms" in The Arts Council building on Witherspoon Street; it moved to larger quarters in the old Valley Road School building in 2003. In 2013 the station moved from Valley Road, to newly renovated quarters in the former Borough Hall building at 1 Monument Drive.

== Shows produced ==
=== Back Story with Joan Goldstein ===
Monthly forum hosted by sociologist and educator Joan Goldstein will explore current issues of the day, both national and local, with guests invited for their expertise or particular viewpoints. Produced at PCTV. Mon. at 7:00 am, Wed. at 8:30 pm and Sun. at 5:30 pm.

=== Medical Tips You Need to Know ===
Medical Tips You Need to Know went on the air in 2009; program hosts Patricia Raya, RN, C, MBA and Corine Mogenis, Medical Paralegal, discussed health topics with the goal of helping people navigate the healthcare system

=== Talking Jazz with Eric Mintel ===
First aired on Feb. 8, 2018, the program features performances by and interviews with jazz musicians, and with other figures on the jazz scene. Guests have included Ella Ghant, a singer, and pianists Jim Riddle and Steve Rudolph.

=== Secrets of College Planning ===
Anthony Uva was an athlete in high school and a NJ state champion at a Group 1 school. In 2013, Anthony was asked to host a college information talk show called Secrets of College Planning. There have been more than 200 shows broadcast and he has a social media following of over 1 million.

Rebranding of Princeton Community Television

After a protacted legal battle with the Princeton Municipal Council over funding, PCTV eventually became Central New Jersey Network in 2022.
