= Byron Baer =

American politician (1929–2007)

Member of the New Jersey Senate from the 37th district
- In office January 11, 1994 – September 8, 2005
- Preceded by: Matthew Feldman
- Succeeded by: Loretta Weinberg

Member of the New Jersey General Assembly
- In office January 11, 1972 – January 11, 1994 Serving with Albert Burstein, D. Bennett Mazur and Loretta Weinberg
- Preceded by: Thomas Costa; William J. Dorgan
- Succeeded by: Ken Zisa
- Constituency: District 13B (1972–74); 37th district (1974–94)

Personal details
- Born: October 18, 1929 Pittsburgh, Pennsylvania
- Died: June 24, 2007 (aged 77) Englewood, New Jersey
- Party: Democratic

Byron M. Baer (October 18, 1929 – June 24, 2007) was an American civil rights activist and Democratic Party politician who represented the New Jersey's 37th legislative district in the General Assembly from 1972 to 1994 and the Senate from 1994 to 2005.

Baer was the primary author of the Open Public Meetings Act, the basic public records law in New Jersey, which was later renamed in his honor. He was an advocate of open government throughout his legislative career. Baer also sponsored a bill establishing New Jersey's Office of the Child Advocate and the state's identity theft law.

== Early life and education ==
According to his wife, Baer's grandparents emigrated from Germany and helped family members emigrate from Germany during the rise of the Nazi Party.

Baer attended Cornell University, New York University, and Columbia University but never received a degree.

== Early career and activism ==
Baer had a short-lived career in special effects for movies, which included work on the horror film The Brain That Wouldn't Die.

On July 29, 1961, Baer was one of ten activists who took a bus from Nashville, Tennessee to a segregated Greyhound bus station in Jackson, Mississippi. After police ordered them to leave and forcibly removed them, they were sentenced to 45 days in jail. Baer was held at Parchman State Prison. On the knowledge that Parchman did not conduct cavity searches of inmates, Baer smuggled in a miniature radio by hiding the disassembled parts in a condom in his rectum. The radio, which fellow inmate Wollcott Smith described as "close to state-of-the-art for 1961," was powered by a battery from a pair of glasses with a built-in hearing aid, which Baer had purchased in Nashville. According to fellow Freedom Rider and cellmate Rick Sheviakov, Baer also smuggled in paper, pencils, thread, pins, and a razor blade by hiding the objects in tinfoil gum wrappers in his mouth. While in prison, he fashioned a chess set out of bread and coffee. After his imprisonment, Baer emerged as a leader in the Congress of Racial Equality. In 1964, he led a black voter registration drive in Tennessee and helped secure the election of Al Gore Sr. to the United States Senate.

Through his activism, Baer personally advised and befriended Martin Luther King Jr. Baer attended the March on Washington in 1963 and participated in the Selma to Montgomery marches of 1965. King relied on Baer, who had experience in film, to advise on lighting for King's media appearances. Baer later served on New Jersey's standing Martin Luther King Jr. Commemorative Commission, which works to raise public awareness of King's ideals and philosophy, from 2002 to 2004.

In his hometown of Englewood, Baer was part of the movement to desegregate local public schools, and he advocated for fair housing policies in the city. On at least one occasion, Baer led thirty Bergen County, New Jersey activists to Baltimore, Maryland to protest a segregated restaurant.

== Political career ==
In 1965, Arnold E. Brown became the first black assemblyman from Bergen County and hired Baer as a legislative aide. In 1969, Baer advised the Democratic caucus on redistricting and drew new maps by hand.

=== New Jersey General Assembly (1974–94) ===
In 1971, the legislature created a new eastern Bergen County district centered on Englewood, Fort Lee and Teaneck. Local Democrats chose Baer and Albert Burstein to run for the seat; they would serve together until Burstein left office in 1982.

Baer was first elected to the New Jersey General Assembly in 1973, serving for ten terms until his election to the Senate in 1993.

While in the Assembly, Baer served in a variety of different posts including assistant minority leader (1986–89), minority leader pro tempore (1992–93), associate Assembly leader (1990), and deputy speaker (1991). He sponsored his signature piece of legislation, the basic public records law in New Jersey. Later, he co-sponsored its revision in 2002. The Act was officially renamed the Senator Byron M. Baer Open Public Meetings Act.

==== Migrant workers' camp incident ====
In 1974, Baer attempted to conduct a surprise inspection at a migrant workers' camp on a Gloucester County farm, accompanied by Newark Star-Ledger staff. Baer was assaulted by the camp foreman, who broke Baer's arm in three places and broke the windshield and windows of Baer's car. Tom Hurd, a Star-Ledger photographer, was also injured.

The farm filed trespassing charges against Baer and Charles Q. Finley, a Star-Ledger reporter. Both were arrested and acquitted after a trial in Clarksboro municipal court. The foreman was also acquitted of assault charges in state court and acquitted of slavery charges in federal court.

Although the incident resulted in acquittal for both Baer and the foreman, it drew national attention to the treatment of migrant workers in New Jersey. Baer sponsored a bill to hold farmers liable for the workers on their farms, which passed the Assembly in 1974.

==== 1976 campaign for U.S. representative ====
In 1976, Baer challenged incumbent U.S. representative Henry Helstoski in the Democratic primary. Helstoski, who had been under investigation for corruption since 1975, was indicted one week before the primary on charges of extortion, bribery, perjury, obstruction of justice, and conspiracy. He denied each charge and argued that they were politically motivated.

In an NBC debate shortly on the Sunday before the election, Baer argued that Helstoski was not electable and nominating him for another term would give the seat to the Republican Party. Although Baer only narrowly lost on election day by under 100 votes, absentee ballots showed an almost unanimous result for Helstoski. Baer challenged the results from Hudson County as fraudulent. His challenge dragged the race into the summer. After Superior Court judge Thomas O'Brien ordered a recount in North Bergen, Baer gained 200 votes. On August 11, Superior Court judge John Marzulli ordered a new primary election.

In the re-run on September 21, Helstoski won with 55 percent of the vote. Turnout increased, primarily in Hudson County. However, Helstoski lost the general election to Harold Hollenbeck.

=== New Jersey Senate (1994–2005) ===
In February 1993, Baer announced that he would run for the open seat in the New Jersey Senate being vacated by Matthew Feldman. Baer won the Bergen County organization line by only one vote over Englewood mayor Donald Aronson. He won the primary over Aronson and the general election over former Hackensack council member Mauro Mecca, with 60 percent of the vote in each. Baer was easily re-elected to three more terms before resigning in 2005. In 1997, he defeated Bogota mayor Steve Lonegan.

In the Senate, Baer filled a variety of different leadership roles including as Democratic Senate Leader ex officio (2002–2003), Minority Leader pro tempore (1996–2001), and Senate Leader ex officio, a post he held from 2004.

As Senator, Baer served on a variety of Senate committees including the Legislative Services Commission, Joint Committee on Public Schools, State Government, and Judiciary. He was also the chairman of the Senate Commerce Committee.

Baer resigned from office effective September 8, 2005, citing his poor health. In the special election to complete his term, Loretta Weinberg defeated Ken Zisa for the Democratic Party endorsement after a protracted legal battle, won the general election, and was sworn in on November 10.

== Personal life ==
Baer was a resident of Englewood, New Jersey. He was married to Linda Pollitt Baer, a New Jersey administrative law judge and former Bergen County Freeholder. His children are David Baer and Laura Baer and his stepchildren are Lara (Pollitt) Rodriquez and Roger Pollitt.

Baer died on June 24, 2007 from congestive heart failure at an assisted living facility, following several years of ill-health. He was Jewish.
