= 2007 New Jersey General Assembly election =

- November 6, 2007

All 80 seats to the General Assembly 41 seats needed for a majority
- Turnout: 32% (▼17pp)
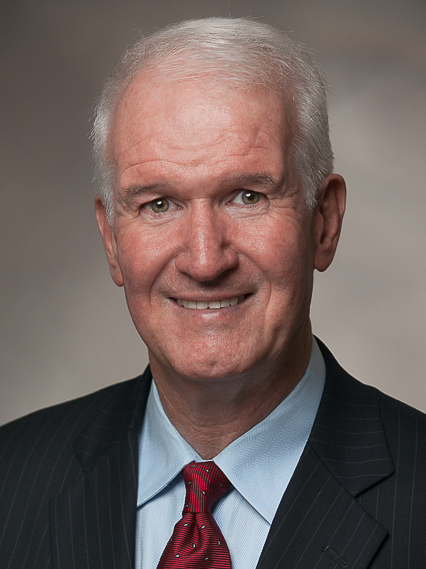

	Majority party	Minority party
Leader	Joseph J. Roberts	Alex DeCroce
Party	Democratic	Republican
Leader since	January 10, 2006	January 12, 2004
Leader's seat	5th (Bellmawr)	26th (Parsippany–Troy Hills)
Last election	49	31
Seats before	50	30
Seats won	48	32
Seat change	▼2	▲2
- Results: Democratic gain Republican gain Democratic hold Republican hold
Speaker before election
Joseph J. Roberts
Democratic
Elected Speaker
Joseph J. Roberts
Democratic

The 2007 New Jersey General Assembly elections were held on November 6, 2007, for all 80 seats in the lower house of the New Jersey Legislature. The election occurred midway through Democratic Governor Jon Corzine's term. Democrats held a 49–31 majority in the lower house prior to the election. The members of the New Jersey Legislature are chosen from 40 electoral districts. Each district elects one State Senator and two State Assembly members. New Jersey uses coterminous legislative districts for both its State Senate and General Assembly.

The Democratic Party won a 48–32 majority. Republicans were able to flip one seat in the 2nd, 8th (after a Republican switched to the Democrats) and 12th districts, while Democrats flipped one seat in the 14th.

== Incumbents not seeking re-election ==
=== Democratic ===
- Jeff Van Drew, District 1
- Jim Whelan, District 2
- David R. Mayer, District 4
- Michael J. Panter, District 12
- Mims Hackett, District 27
- William D. Payne, District 29
- Charles Epps, District 31
- Louis Manzo, District 31
- Albio Sires, District 33
- Brian Stack, District 33
- Alfred Steele, District 35
- Robert Gordon, District 38

=== Republican ===
- Francis J. Blee, District 2
- Larry Chatzidakis, District 8
- Francis Bodine, District 8
- Christopher J. Connors, District 9
- Steve Corodemus, District 11
- Sean Kean, District 11
- Jennifer Beck, District 12
- Bill Baroni, District 14
- Christopher Bateman, District 16
- Guy Gregg, District 24
- Joseph Pennacchio, District 26
- Kevin J. O'Toole, District 40

== Summary of results by district ==
Legislative District	Position	Incumbent	Party	Elected Assembly Member	Party
1st	1	Nelson Albano	Democratic	Nelson Albano	Democrat
1st	2	Jeff Van Drew	Democrat	Matthew Milam	Democratic
2nd	1	Francis J. Blee	Republican	John Amodeo	Republican
2nd	2	Jim Whelan	Democrat	Vincent Polistina	Republican
3rd	1	John J. Burzichelli	Democrat	John J. Burzichelli	Democrat
3rd	2	Douglas H. Fisher	Democrat	Douglas H. Fisher	Democrat
4th	1	Paul D. Moriarty	Democrat	Paul D. Moriarty	Democrat
4th	2	David R. Mayer	Democrat	Sandra Love	Democrat
5th	1	Nilsa Cruz-Perez	Democrat	Nilsa Cruz-Perez	Democrat
5th	2	Joseph J. Roberts	Democrat	Joseph J. Roberts	Democrat
6th	1	Louis Greenwald	Democrat	Louis Greenwald	Democrat
6th	2	Pamela Rosen Lampitt	Democrat	Pamela Rosen Lampitt	Democrat
7th	1	Herb Conaway	Democrat	Herb Conaway	Democrat
7th	2	Jack Conners	Democrat	Jack Conners	Democrat
8th	1	Larry Chatzidakis	Republican	Dawn Addiego	Republican
8th	2	Francis Bodine	Democrat	Scott Rudder	Republican
9th	1	Brian E. Rumpf	Republican	Brian E. Rumpf	Republican
9th	2	Christopher J. Connors	Republican	Daniel Van Pelt	Republican
10th	1	James W. Holzapfel	Republican	James W. Holzapfel	Republican
10th	2	David W. Wolfe	Republican	David W. Wolfe	Republican
11th	1	Sean Kean	Republican	Mary Pat Angelini	Republican
11th	2	Steve Corodemus	Republican	David Rible	Republican
12th	1	Jennifer Beck	Republican	Declan O'Scanlon	Republican
12th	2	Michael J. Panter	Democratic	Caroline Casagrande	Republican
13th	1	Samuel D. Thompson	Republican	Samuel D. Thompson	Republican
13th	2	Amy Handlin	Republican	Amy Handlin	Republican
14th	1	Bill Baroni	Republican	Wayne DeAngelo	Democrat
14th	2	Linda Greenstein	Democrat	Linda Greenstein	Democrat
15th	1	Bonnie Watson Coleman	Democrat	Bonnie Watson Coleman	Democrat
15th	2	Reed Gusciora	Democrat	Reed Gusciora	Democrat
16th	1	Peter Biondi	Republican	Peter Biondi	Republican
16th	2	Christopher Bateman	Republican	Denise Coyle	Republican
17th	1	Upendra Chivukula	Democrat	Upendra Chivukula	Democrat
17th	2	Joseph V. Egan	Democrat	Joseph V. Egan	Democrat
18th	1	Peter Barnes	Democrat	Peter Barnes	Democrat
18th	2	Patrick J. Diegnan	Democrat	Patrick J. Diegnan	Democrat
19th	1	Joseph Vas	Democrat	Joseph Vas	Democrat
19th	2	John Wisniewski	Democrat	John Wisniewski	Democrat
20th	1	Neil M. Cohen	Democrat	Neil M. Cohen	Democrat
20th	2	Joseph Cryan	Democrat	Joseph Cryan	Democrat
21st	1	Jon Bramnick	Republican	Jon Bramnick	Republican
21st	2	Eric Munoz	Republican	Eric Munoz	Republican
22nd	1	Linda Stender	Democrat	Linda Stender	Democrat
22nd	2	Jerry Green	Democrat	Jerry Green	Democrat
23rd	1	Michael J. Doherty	Republican	Erik Peterson	Republican
23rd	2	Marcia Karrow	Republican	Marcia Karrow	Republican
24th	1	Guy Gregg	Republican	Gary Chiusano	Republican
24th	2	Alison Littell McHose	Republican	Alison Littell McHose	Republican
25th	1	Rick Merkt	Republican	Rick Merkt	Republican
25th	2	Michael Patrick Carroll	Republican	Michael Patrick Carroll	Republican
26th	1	Alex DeCroce	Republican	Alex DeCroce	Republican
26th	2	Joseph Pennacchio	Republican	Jay Webber	Republican
27th	1	John F. McKeon	Democrat	John F. McKeon	Democrat
27th	2	Mims Hackett	Democrat	Mila Jasey	Democrat
28th	1	Craig A. Stanley	Democrat	Cleopatra Tucker	Democrat
28th	2	Oadline Truitt	Democrat	Ralph R. Caputo	Democrat
29th	1	William D. Payne	Democrat	Albert Coutinho	Democrat
29th	2	Wilfredo Caraballo	Democrat	L. Grace Spencer	Democrat
30th	1	Joseph Malone	Republican	Joseph Malone	Republican
30th	2	Ronald S. Dancer	Republican	Ronald S. Dancer	Republican
31st	1	Louis Manzo	Democrat	L. Harvey Smith	Democrat
31st	2	Charles Epps	Democrat	Anthony Chiappone	Democrat
32nd	1	Joan M. Quigley	Democrat	Joan Quigley	Democrat
32nd	2	Vincent Prieto	Democrat	Vincent Prieto	Democrat
33rd	1	Albio Sires	Democrat	Ruben Ramos	Democrat
33rd	2	Brian Stack	Democrat	Caridad Rodriguez	Democrat
34th	1	Thomas P. Giblin	Democrat	Thomas P. Giblin	Democrat
34th	2	Sheila Oliver	Democrat	Sheila Oliver	Democrat
35th	1	Nellie Pou	Democrat	Nellie Pou	Democrat
35th	2	Alfred Steele	Democrat	Elease Evans	Democrat
36th	1	Gary Schaer	Democrat	Gary Schaer	Democrat
36th	2	Frederick Scalera	Democrat	Frederick Scalera	Democrat
37th	1	Gordon M. Johnson	Democrat	Gordon M. Johnson	Democrat
37th	2	Valerie Huttle	Democrat	Valerie Huttle	Democrat
38th	1	Joan Voss	Democrat	Joan Voss	Democrat
38th	2	Robert M. Gordon	Democrat	Connie Wagner	Democrat
39th	1	Charlotte Vandervalk	Republican	Charlotte Vandervalk	Republican
39th	2	John E. Rooney	Republican	John E. Rooney	Republican
40th	1	Kevin J. O'Toole	Republican	Scott Rumana	Republican
40th	2	David C. Russo	Republican	David Russo	Republican

=== Close races ===
Districts where the difference of total votes between the top-two parties was under 10%:

1. District 1, 8.3%
2. District 12, 2.2% gain R
3. District 14, 2.2% gain D
4. District 22, 9.2%

== List of races ==
=== District 1 ===
New Jersey general election, 2007
Party	Candidate	Votes	%	±%
Democratic	Nelson Albano	27,721	28.8	▲0.7
Democratic	Matthew Milam	24,422	25.3	▼10.5
Republican	Michael J. Donohue	22,402	23.2	▲1.3
Republican	R. Norris Clark Jr.	21,820	22.6	▲8.5
Total votes		96,365	100.0	

=== District 2 ===
New Jersey general election, 2007
Party	Candidate	Votes	%	±%
Republican	John F. Amodeo	26,214	28.3	▲2.6
Republican	Vince Polistina	25,603	27.6	▲6.6
Democratic	Joe Wilkins	21,699	23.4	▼4.2
Democratic	Blondell K. Spellman	19,260	20.8	▼3.4
Total votes		92,776	100.0	

=== District 3 ===
New Jersey general election, 2007
Party	Candidate	Votes	%	±%
Democratic	John J. Burzichelli	30,222	29.5	▼0.1
Democratic	Douglas H. Fisher	30,078	29.3	▼0.2
Republican	Phil Donohue	19,534	19.0	▼1.2
Republican	Jeffrey Stepler	18,927	18.4	▼1.1
Green	Margie MacWilliams	2,078	2.0	N/A
Green	Charles Woodrow	1,755	1.7	N/A
Total votes		102,594	100.0	

=== District 4 ===
New Jersey general election, 2007
Party	Candidate	Votes	%	±%
Democratic	Sandra Love	19,429	27.9	▼3.9
Democratic	Paul D. Moriarty	19,357	27.8	▼4.0
Republican	Patricia Fratticcioli	15,656	22.5	▲3.7
Republican	Agnes Gardiner	15,238	21.9	▲4.4
Total votes		69,680	100.0	

=== District 5 ===
New Jersey general election, 2007
Party	Candidate	Votes	%	±%
Democratic	Joe Roberts	17,554	32.2	▼13.2
Democratic	Nilsa Cruz-Perez	15,978	29.3	▼13.2
Republican	Edward Torres	9,136	16.8	N/A
Republican	Jonathan Mangel	9,070	16.6	N/A
Green	Richard L. Giovanoni	1,419	2.6	▼2.5
Green	Mark Heacock	1,381	2.5	▼2.7
Total votes		54,538	100.0	

=== District 6 ===
New Jersey general election, 2007
Party	Candidate	Votes	%	±%
Democratic	Louis D. Greenwald	23,626	28.8	▼2.5
Democratic	Pamela R. Lampitt	22,701	27.7	▼0.9
Republican	JoAnn R. Gurenlian	16,850	20.5	▼0.3
Republican	Bradley L. Mattson	16,199	19.7	▲0.4
Green	Michael Gellman	2,677	3.3	N/A
Total votes		82,053	100.0	

=== District 7 ===
New Jersey general election, 2007
Party	Candidate	Votes	%	±%
Democratic	Herb Conaway	22,865	28.2	▼4.6
Democratic	Jack Conners	22,760	28.0	▼4.2
Republican	Brian Propp	17,843	22.0	▲4.0
Republican	Nancy Griffin	17,741	21.8	▲4.8
Total votes		81,209	100.0	

=== District 8 ===
New Jersey general election, 2007
Party	Candidate	Votes	%	±%
Republican	Dawn Marie Addiego	25,310	28.0	▼1.5
Republican	Scott Rudder	25,298	28.0	▼0.4
Democratic	Tracy L. Riley	20,540	22.7	▲1.9
Democratic	Christopher D. Fifis	19,234	21.3	▲0.6
Total votes		90,382	100.0	

=== District 9 ===
New Jersey general election, 2007
Party	Candidate	Votes	%	±%
Republican	Brian E. Rumpf	33,281	30.3	▲0.3
Republican	Daniel M. Van Pelt	31,321	28.5	▼3.6
Democratic	Michele F. Rosen	22,954	20.9	▲1.2
Democratic	William Coulter	22,295	20.3	▲2.1
Total votes		109,851	100.0	

=== District 10 ===
New Jersey general election, 2007
Party	Candidate	Votes	%	±%
Republican	David W. Wolfe	29,619	31.6	▼0.7
Republican	Jim Holzapfel	29,014	31.0	▼0.7
Democratic	John Kaklamanis	15,560	16.6	▼1.2
Democratic	Salvatore Martino	15,282	16.3	▼1.4
Green	Elizabeth Arnone	2,226	2.4	N/A
Green	Matthew Q. Dimon	2,029	2.2	N/A
Total votes		93,730	100.0	

=== District 11 ===
New Jersey general election, 2007
Party	Candidate	Votes	%	±%
Republican	David P. Rible	24,641	29.1	▲3.1
Republican	Mary Pat Angelini	24,638	29.1	▲3.4
Democratic	John P. Napolitani Sr.	18,316	21.7	▼2.6
Democratic	John J. Pirnat	16,970	20.1	▼3.9
Total votes		84,565	100.0	

=== District 12 ===
New Jersey general election, 2007
Party	Candidate	Votes	%	±%
Republican	Declan O'Scanlon Jr.	24,493	25.6	▲1.6
Republican	Caroline Casagrande	24,352	25.5	▲0.7
Democratic	Mike Panter	23,842	25.0	▲1.0
Democratic	Amy Mallet	22,870	23.9	▲0.1
Total votes		95,557	100.0	

=== District 13 ===
New Jersey general election, 2007
Party	Candidate	Votes	%	±%
Republican	Amy H. Handlin	22,705	28.6	▲2.7
Republican	Samuel Thompson	22,576	28.5	▲2.6
Democratic	Patricia Walsh	17,502	22.1	▼0.7
Democratic	Robert "Bob" Brown	16,505	20.8	▼1.1
Total votes		79,288	100.0	

=== District 14 ===
New Jersey general election, 2007
Party	Candidate	Votes	%	±%
Democratic	Linda R. Greenstein	28,266	27.1	▲0.4
Democratic	Wayne P. DeAngelo	25,119	24.0	▲1.7
Republican	Thomas Goodwin	24,298	23.3	▼4.4
Republican	Adam Bushman	23,711	22.7	▲0.4
Libertarian	Jason M. Scheurer	1,775	1.7	▲1.2
Libertarian	Ray F. Cragle	1,308	1.3	▲0.8
Total votes		104,477	100.0	

=== District 15 ===
New Jersey general election, 2007
Party	Candidate	Votes	%	±%
Democratic	Bonnie Watson Coleman	19,619	32.0	▼2.7
Democratic	Reed Gusciora	19,096	31.2	▼2.3
Republican	Norbert E. Donelly	10,489	17.1	▲0.9
Republican	Sylvester Bobby Bryant	10,331	16.9	▲1.4
Green	Nicholas Mellis	1,686	2.8	N/A
Total votes		61,221	100.0	

=== District 16 ===
New Jersey general election, 2007
Party	Candidate	Votes	%	±%
Republican	Denise Coyle	26,027	29.3	▼2.9
Republican	Pete Biondi	25,876	29.1	▼2.7
Democratic	Michael Fedun	18,898	21.3	▲3.2
Democratic	William Kole	18,042	20.3	▲2.4
Total votes		88,843	100.0	

=== District 17 ===
New Jersey general election, 2007
Party	Candidate	Votes	%	±%
Democratic	Joseph V. Egan	16,456	31.2	▼2.8
Democratic	Upendra J. Chivukula	15,765	29.9	▼2.5
Republican	Matthew "Skip" House	10,324	19.6	▲1.5
Republican	Leonard J. Messineo	10,257	19.4	▲3.9
Total votes		52,802	100.0	

=== District 18 ===
New Jersey general election, 2007
Party	Candidate	Votes	%	±%
Democratic	Patrick J. Diegnan Jr	18,858	28.8	▼0.3
Democratic	Peter J. Barnes III	18,621	28.4	▼2.4
Republican	Joseph Sinagra	14,121	21.6	▲1.5
Republican	William England	13,921	21.2	▲1.2
Total votes		65,521	100.0	

=== District 19 ===
New Jersey general election, 2007
Party	Candidate	Votes	%	±%
Democratic	John S. Wisniewski	17,738	33.3	▼1.5
Democratic	Joseph Vas	14,376	27.0	▼4.6
Republican	Paul "Daniels" Danielczyk	10,788	20.2	▲3.4
Republican	Reyes Ortega	10,428	19.6	▲2.9
Total votes		53,330	100.0	

=== District 20 ===
New Jersey general election, 2007
Party	Candidate	Votes	%	±%
Democratic	Neil Cohen	10,000	36.7	▼13.6
Democratic	Joseph Cryan	9,583	35.2	▼14.5
Clean Up Government	Marlene J. Abitanto	3,858	14.2	N/A
Clean Up Government	Lester Dominguez	3,810	14.0	N/A
Total votes		27,251	100.0	

=== District 21 ===
New Jersey general election, 2007
Party	Candidate	Votes	%	±%
Republican	Eric Munoz	27,496	29.1	▼0.5
Republican	Jon M. Bramnick	27,322	28.9	▼0.2
Democratic	Bruce Bergen	17,937	19.0	▼1.7
Democratic	Norman Albert	17,629	18.6	▼1.9
Green	George DeCarlo	1,245	1.3	N/A
Green	Ryan P. Reyes	1,180	1.2	N/A
Libertarian	Darren Young	900	1.0	N/A
Libertarian	Jeff Hetrick	850	0.9	N/A
Total votes		94,559	100.0	

=== District 22 ===
New Jersey general election, 2007
Party	Candidate	Votes	%	±%
Democratic	Linda Stender	14,054	27.6	▼4.7
Democratic	Gerald "Jerry" Green	13,765	27.0	▼3.3
Republican	Robert Gatto	10,579	20.7	▲1.0
Republican	Bryan E. Des Rochers	10,380	20.3	▲2.6
Libertarian	Sean Colon	1,215	2.4	N/A
Libertarian	Dolores Makrogiannis	1,018	2.0	N/A
Total votes		51,011	100.0	

=== District 23 ===
New Jersey general election, 2007
Party	Candidate	Votes	%	±%
Republican	Marcia A. Karrow	28,904	31.0	▲1.6
Republican	Michael J. Doherty	28,857	31.0	▼0.8
Democratic	Dominick C. Santini Jr.	18,333	19.7	▼1.2
Democratic	Peter G. Maurer	17,119	18.4	▲0.6
Total votes		93,213	100.0	

=== District 24 ===
New Jersey general election, 2007
Party	Candidate	Votes	%	±%
Republican	Alison Littell McHose	30,453	34.8	▲1.2
Republican	Gary R. Chiusano	29,616	33.8	▲0.8
Democratic	Pat Walsh	13,845	15.8	▼1.0
Democratic	Toni Zimmer	13,644	15.6	▼0.9
Total votes		87,558	100.0	

=== District 25 ===
New Jersey general election, 2007
Party	Candidate	Votes	%	±%
Republican	Rick Merkt	22,102	29.7	▲1.6
Republican	Michael Patrick Carroll	21,468	28.9	▲2.1
Democratic	Dana Wefer	16,001	21.5	▼1.1
Democratic	Marshall L. Gates	14,780	19.9	▼2.6
Total votes		74,351	100.0	

=== District 26 ===
New Jersey general election, 2007
Party	Candidate	Votes	%	±%
Republican	Alex DeCroce	25,342	32.1	▲1.9
Republican	Jay Webber	24,307	30.8	▲1.7
Democratic	David Modrak	13,488	17.1	▼3.0
Democratic	Wayne Marek	13,308	16.9	▼2.5
Green	Michael Spector	971	1.2	N/A
Green	Matthew Norton	935	1.2	N/A
Libertarian	Kenneth Kaplan	577	0.7	▲0.1
Total votes		78,928	100.0	

=== District 27 ===
New Jersey general election, 2007
Party	Candidate	Votes	%	±%
Democratic	John F. McKeon	19,246	40.0	▲5.4
Democratic	Mila M. Jasey	17,620	36.6	▲4.2
Republican	Mark Meyerowitz	8,644	18.0	▲1.3
Ethical Efficient Government	Edward B. Marable Jr	2,627	5.4	N/A
Total votes		48,137	100.0	

=== District 28 ===
New Jersey general election, 2007
Party	Candidate	Votes	%	±%
Democratic	Ralph R. Caputo	12,264	38.8	▼0.8
Democratic	Cleopatra G. Tucker	11,891	37.6	▼1.8
Republican	Michael V. Lewis	3,898	12.3	▲2.1
Republican	Andrew M. Bloschak	3,561	11.3	▲1.3
Total votes		31,614	100.0	

=== District 29 ===
New Jersey general election, 2007
Party	Candidate	Votes	%	±%
Democratic	L. Grace Spencer	11,385	33.9	▼11.4
Democratic	Alberto Coutinho	10,797	32.2	▼11.7
Putting People First	Bessie Walker	4,966	14.8	N/A
New Women Leadership	Carlotta Hall	3,604	10.7	N/A
Republican	Miguel A. Sanabria	948	2.8	▼2.7
Republican	Elaine L. Guarino	829	2.5	▼2.7
For Our Community	Joanne Miller	417	1.2	N/A
Pro Life Conservative	Katie Fowler	227	0.7	N/A
Pro Life Conservative	Aisleigh Riley	221	0.7	N/A
Socialist Workers	Edward Beck	164	0.5	N/A
Total votes		33,558	100.0	

=== District 30 ===
New Jersey general election, 2007
Party	Candidate	Votes	%	±%
Republican	Joseph R. Malone III	23,120	31.6	▼1.0
Republican	Ronald S. Dancer	22,477	30.7	▼1.4
Democratic	Sharon Atkinson	13,906	19.0	▲1.7
Democratic	Jeffrey Williamson	13,657	18.7	▲0.7
Total votes		73,160	100.0	

=== District 31 ===
New Jersey general election, 2007
Party	Candidate	Votes	%	±%
Democratic	Anthony Chiappone	10,754	50.2	▲9.3
Democratic	L. Harvey Smith	10,665	49.8	▲10.7
Total votes		21,419	100.0	

=== District 32 ===
New Jersey general election, 2007
Party	Candidate	Votes	%	±%
Democratic	Vincent Prieto	16,580	41.9	▲3.4
Democratic	Joan M. Quigley	16,544	41.8	▲2.9
Republican	Edward T. O’Neill	3,352	8.5	▼2.3
Republican	Jacob Hahn	3,069	7.8	▼2.7
Total votes		39,545	100.0	

=== District 33 ===
New Jersey general election, 2007
Party	Candidate	Votes	%	±%
Democratic	Ruben J. Ramos Jr	18,708	50.7	▲9.9
Democratic	Caridad Rodriguez	18,227	49.3	▲9.9
Total votes		36,935	100.0	

=== District 34 ===
New Jersey general election, 2007
Party	Candidate	Votes	%	±%
Democratic	Thomas P. Giblin	15,198	35.7	▼13.4
Democratic	Sheila Y. Oliver	14,755	34.6	▼16.3
Republican	Robert C. Bianco	6,432	15.1	N/A
Republican	Clenard H. Childress Jr.	6,210	14.6	N/A
Total votes		42,595	100.0	

=== District 35 ===
New Jersey general election, 2007
Party	Candidate	Votes	%	±%
Democratic	Nellie Pou	11,784	38.9	▲4.6
Democratic	Elease Evans	11,749	38.8	▲4.0
Republican	Chauncey I. Brown III	6,730	22.2	▲6.8
Total votes		30,263	100.0	

=== District 36 ===
New Jersey general election, 2007
Party	Candidate	Votes	%	±%
Democratic	Frederick Scalera	14,619	28.8	▼3.3
Democratic	Gary Schaer	13,687	27.0	▼2.7
Republican	Donald E. Diorio	11,263	22.2	▲3.6
Republican	Carmen Pio Costa	11,151	22.0	▲3.4
Total votes		50,720	100.0	

=== District 37 ===
New Jersey general election, 2007
Party	Candidate	Votes	%	±%
Democratic	Valerie Vainieri Huttle	22,488	36.4	▲1.2
Democratic	Gordon M. Johnson	21,228	34.4	▼1.1
Republican	Frank J. Cifarelli	9,051	14.7	▲0.2
Republican	Wojciech J. Siemaszkiewicz	8,932	14.5	▲0.6
Total votes		61,699	100.0	

=== District 38 ===
New Jersey general election, 2007
Party	Candidate	Votes	%	±%
Democratic	Joan M. Voss	21,779	30.0	0.0
Democratic	Concetta Wagner	21,457	29.6	▼0.9
Republican	John J. Driscoll Jr.	14,997	20.7	▲0.9
Republican	Renee Czarnecki	14,323	19.7	0.0
Total votes		72,556	100.0	

=== District 39 ===
New Jersey general election, 2007
Party	Candidate	Votes	%	±%
Republican	Charlotte Vandervalk	30,234	30.7	▲2.3
Republican	John E. Rooney	27,353	27.8	▲1.5
Democratic	Esther Fletcher	21,771	22.1	▼0.3
Democratic	Carl J. Manna	19,099	19.4	▼2.9
Total votes		98,457	100.0	

=== District 40 ===
New Jersey general election, 2007
Party	Candidate	Votes	%	±%
Republican	Scott T. Rumana	25,372	32.4	▲1.8
Republican	David C. Russo	25,208	32.2	▲1.7
Democratic	Lisa Sciancalepore	13,751	17.6	▼2.4
Democratic	Zonie LeSane	12,339	15.7	▼3.1
Libertarian	Derek DeMarco	855	1.1	N/A
Libertarian	Paul Tahan	819	1.0	N/A
Total votes		78,344	100.0	

== See also ==
- 2007 New Jersey Senate election
