= Robert D. Clifton =

Member of the New Jersey General Assembly (born 1968)

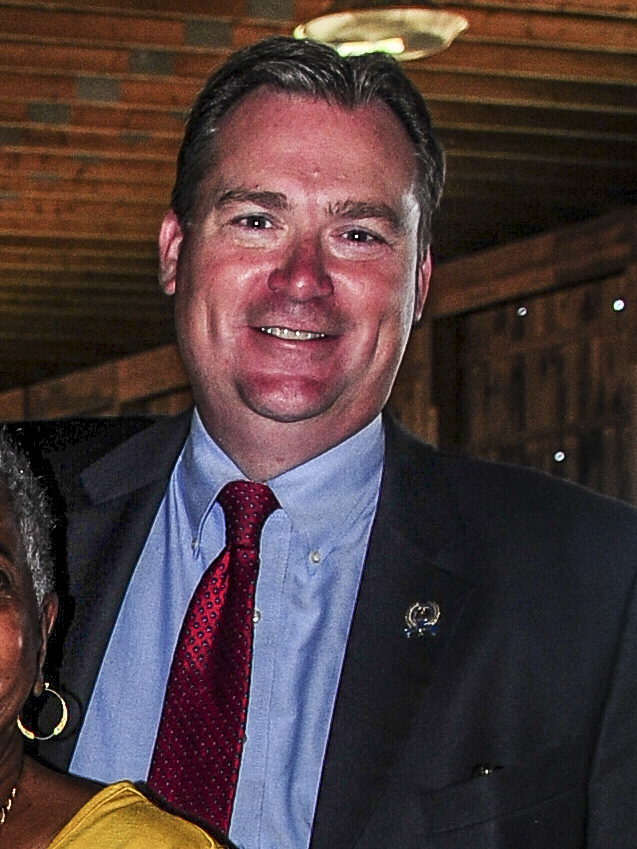

Member of the New Jersey General Assembly from the 12th district
- Incumbent
- Assumed office January 10, 2012 Serving with Alex Sauickie
- Preceded by: Caroline Casagrande; Declan O'Scanlon

Member of the Monmouth County Board of Chosen Freeholders
- In office January 1, 2005 – January 10, 2012
- Preceded by: Edward J. Stominski
- Succeeded by: Serena DiMaso

Mayor of Matawan, New Jersey
- In office October 1, 1996 – January 18, 2005
- Preceded by: Robert Shuey
- Succeeded by: Beatrice Duffy

Personal details
- Born: December 31, 1968 (age 57) Matawan, New Jersey, U.S.
- Party: Republican
- Spouse: Tracy Clifton
- Children: 2
- Education: B.A. Rider College (poli sci); M.A. University of Richmond (poli sci)
- Occupation: Director of Local Government Affairs, Comcast Cable
- Website: www.njleg.state.nj.us/legislative-roster/342/assemblyman-clifton

Robert D. Clifton (born December 31, 1968) is an American Republican Party politician who has represented the 12th Legislative District in the New Jersey General Assembly since January 10, 2012. He previously served on the Monmouth County, New Jersey Board of Chosen Freeholders from 2005 until he took office in the Assembly.

== Early life ==
Clifton was born and raised in Matawan, where he attended local elementary schools and St. John Vianney High School. He earned a bachelor's degree in political science at Rider College (now Rider University) and a master's degree in political science at the University of Richmond. He has been employed by Comcast Cable as Director of Government and Community Affairs since 2001. Prior to that, Clifton was Director of Industry Relations for the New Jersey Pavement and Asphalt Association, where he acted as liaison between the trade association and municipalities throughout the state regarding road improvement issues. He also served as an assistant to the Deputy Commissioner of the New Jersey Department of Labor and a legislative aide to former Assemblyman Michael Arnone.

== Monmouth County Politics ==
Clifton was the Mayor of Matawan from 1996 until 2005. He was appointed mayor in October 1996 upon the resignation of Robert Shuey. In addition, he served on the borough's unified Planning Board and Zoning Board of Adjustment, the Board of Health, and the Monmouth County Board of Drug & Alcohol Abuse Services. He also served as chairman of the Bayshore Conference of Mayors. In order to focus on his position as a newly elected Freeholder, he resigned from his mayoral post on January 18, 2005. As Freeholder, Clifton oversaw Finance and Information Technology which includes Department of Finance, the Monmouth County Improvement Authority, Information Technology Services, Department of Purchasing, Records Management and the County Treasurer. Clifton served three terms on the Board of Chosen Freeholders, elected in 2004, 2007, and 2010. In 2008, he served as deputy director of the Board; Clifton was succeeded in that post by John D'Amico, Jr. in 2009. At the January 7, 2010 annual reorganization, he was again chosen as deputy director and at the January 6, 2011 annual reorganization, he was chosen as Director of the Monmouth County, New Jersey Board of Chosen Freeholders.

== New Jersey Assembly ==
In 2011, after legislative redistricting, Clifton ran for the Assembly seat in the 12th District that was opened when Samuel D. Thompson ran for New Jersey Senate. He and his running mate Ronald S. Dancer defeated the Democratic candidates, William Spedding and Catherine Tinney Rome, in the general election. He was sworn in on January 10, 2012.

=== Committees ===
- Budget
- Housing and Community Development
- Transportation and Independent Authorities

=== District 12 ===
Each of the 40 districts in the New Jersey Legislature has one representative in the New Jersey Senate and two members in the New Jersey General Assembly. The representatives from the 12th District for the 2024—2025 Legislative Session are:

- Senator Owen Henry (R)
- Assemblyman Robert D. Clifton (R)
- Assemblyman Alex Sauickie (R)

== Personal life ==
Clifton lives in Matawan with his wife Tracy and his two sons.

== Electoral history ==
=== Assembly ===
12th Legislative District General Election, 2023
Party	Candidate	Votes	%
Republican	Robert D. Clifton (incumbent)	28,200	32.0
Republican	Alex Sauickie (incumbent)	27,061	30.7
Democratic	Paul Sarti	16,767	19.0
Democratic	Raya Arbiol	16,164	18.3
Total votes		88,192	100.0
Republican hold			
Republican hold			

12th legislative district general election, 2021
Party	Candidate	Votes	%
Republican	Ronald S. Dancer (incumbent)	47,595	33.37%
Republican	Robert D. Clifton (incumbent)	46,378	32.52%
Democratic	Michael Palazzolla	24,642	17.28%
Democratic	Raya Arbiol	23,993	16.82%
Total votes		142,608	100.0
Republican hold			

12th Legislative District General Election, 2019
Party	Candidate	Votes	%
Republican	Ronald Dancer (incumbent)	23,866	32.19%
Republican	Robert Clifton (incumbent)	23,173	31.25%
Democratic	David Lande	13,909	18.76%
Democratic	Malini Guha	13,194	17.8%
Total votes		74,142	100%
Republican hold			

New Jersey general election, 2017
Party	Candidate	Votes	%	±%
Republican	Ronald S. Dancer	30,348	29.3	▼0.2
Republican	Robert D. Clifton	29,610	28.5	▲0.5
Democratic	Gene Davis	21,441	20.7	▲0.3
Democratic	Nirav Patel	20,397	19.7	▼0.6
Libertarian	Anthony J. Storrow	1,016	1.0	N/A
Libertarian	Daniel A. Krause	938	0.9	N/A
Total votes		'103,750'	'100.0'	

New Jersey general election, 2015
Party	Candidate	Votes	%	±%
Republican	Ronald S. Dancer	15,164	29.5	▼3.3
Republican	Robert D. Clifton	14,433	28.0	▼3.7
Democratic	David W. Merwin	10,496	20.4	▲2.9
Democratic	Robert P. Kurzydlowski	10,449	20.3	▲3.7
Green	Stephen N. Zielinski Sr.	945	1.8	N/A
Total votes		'51,487'	'100.0'	

New Jersey general election, 2013
Party	Candidate	Votes	%	±%
Republican	Ronald S. Dancer	32,188	32.8	▲2.5
Republican	Robert D. Clifton	31,059	31.7	▲2.6
Democratic	Lawrence J. Furman	17,119	17.5	▼2.9
Democratic	Nicholas Nellegar	16,312	16.6	▼3.7
For the People	Diane Bindler	1,354	1.4	N/A
Total votes		'98,032'	'100.0'	

New Jersey general election, 2011
Party	Candidate	Votes	%
Republican	Ronald S. Dancer	22,345	30.3
Republican	Robert D. Clifton	21,469	29.1
Democratic	William "Bill" Spedding	15,077	20.4
Democratic	Catherine Tinney Rome	14,969	20.3
Total votes		73,860	100.0

== See also ==
- List of Monmouth County Board of County Commissioner Directors

New Jersey General Assembly
Preceded by Declan O'Scanlon; Caroline Casagrande	Member of the New Jersey General Assembly for the 12th District; January 12, 2012 – present With: Ronald S. Dancer	Succeeded by Incumbent
Political offices
Preceded by Edward J. Stominski	Monmouth County at-large Freeholder; January 1, 2005 – January 12, 2012	Succeeded by Serena DiMaso
Preceded by Lillian G. Burry	Monmouth County Freeholder Director; 2011 – 2012	Succeeded by John P. Curley
Preceded by Robert Shuey	Mayor of Matawan, New Jersey; October 1996 – January 18, 2005	Succeeded by Beatrice Duffy
