= 2007 New Jersey Senate election =

2007 New Jersey Senate elections
- November 4, 2007

All 40 seats in the New Jersey State Senate 21 seats needed for a majority
- Turnout: 32% (▼2pp)
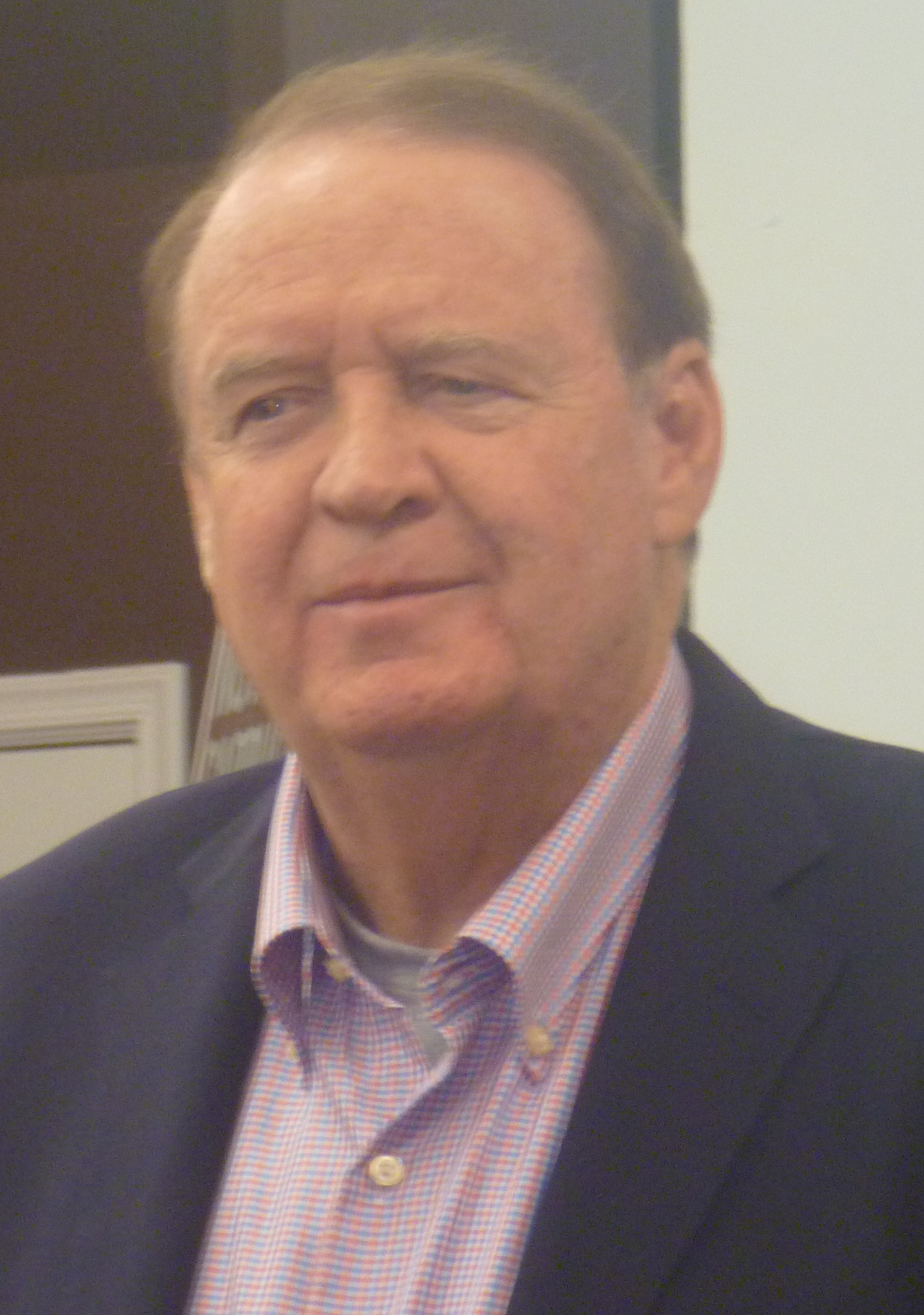

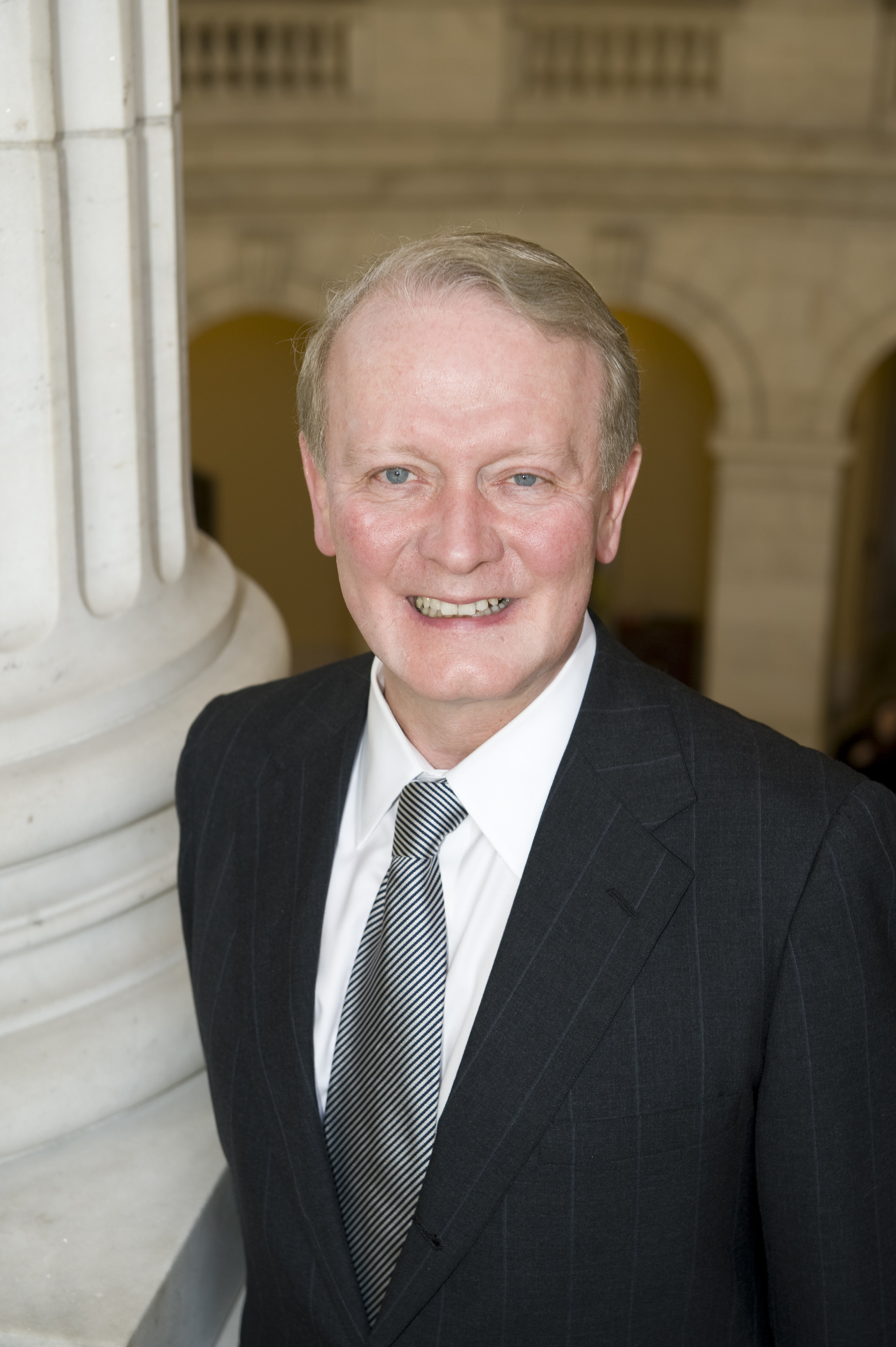
	Majority party	Minority party
Leader	Richard Codey	Leonard Lance (stepped down)
Party	Democratic	Republican
Leader since	January 12, 1998	January 13, 2004
Leader's seat	27th (West Orange)	23rd (Clinton Township)
Last election	22	18
Seats before	21	18
Seats won	23	17
Seat change	▲2	▼1
- Results by district Democratic hold Democratic gain Republican hold Republican gain
Senate President before election
Richard Codey
Democratic
Elected Senate President
Richard Codey
Democratic

The 2007 New Jersey Senate election was held on November 4.

The election took place midway through Jon Corzine's term as Governor of New Jersey. Democrats gained an additional seat by winning two Republican seats in South Jersey (districts 1 and 2), though one-term Senator Ellen Karcher lost re-election to Jennifer Beck in the 12th district. The Democratic gains in South Jersey laid the groundwork for a transfer of power within the Democratic Party, culminating in Steve Sweeney's election as Senate President midway through the 2008–12 term.

Contents
Incumbents not running • Summary of results
By District: 1 • 2 • 3 • 4 • 5 • 6 • 7 • 8 • 9 • 10 • 11 • 12 • 13 • 14 • 15 • 16 • 17 • 18 • 19 • 20 • 21 • 22 • 23 • 24 • 25 • 26 • 27 • 28 • 29 • 30 • 31 • 32 • 33 • 34 • 35 • 36 • 37 • 38 • 39 • 40

== Incumbents not running for re-election ==
=== Democratic ===
- Wayne R. Bryant (District 5)
- Sharpe James (District 29)
- Bernard Kenny (District 33)
- Joseph Coniglio (District 38)

=== Republican ===
- Martha W. Bark (District 8)
- Joseph A. Palaia (District 11)
- Peter Inverso (District 14)
- Walter J. Kavanaugh (District 16)
- Robert E. Littell (District 24)
- Robert J. Martin (District 26)
- Henry McNamara (District 40)

== Summary of results by State Senate district ==
District	Incumbent	Party	Elected Senator	Party
1st Legislative District	Nicholas Asselta	Rep	Jeff Van Drew	Dem
2nd Legislative District	Sonny McCullough	Rep	Jim Whelan	Dem
3rd Legislative District	Steve Sweeney	Dem	Steve Sweeney	Dem
4th Legislative District	Fred Madden	Dem	Fred Madden	Dem
5th Legislative District	Wayne R. Bryant	Dem	Dana Redd	Dem
6th Legislative District	John Adler	Dem	John Adler	Dem
7th Legislative District	Diane Allen	Rep	Diane Allen	Rep
8th Legislative District	Martha W. Bark	Rep	Phil Haines	Rep
9th Legislative District	Leonard T. Connors	Rep	Christopher Connors	Rep
10th Legislative District	Andrew R. Ciesla	Rep	Andrew R. Ciesla	Rep
11th Legislative District	Joseph A. Palaia	Rep	Sean Kean	Rep
12th Legislative District	Ellen Karcher	Dem	Jennifer Beck	Rep
13th Legislative District	Joe Kyrillos	Rep	Joe Kyrillos	Rep
14th Legislative District	Peter Inverso	Rep	Bill Baroni	Rep
15th Legislative District	Shirley Turner	Dem	Shirley Turner	Dem
16th Legislative District	Walter J. Kavanaugh	Rep	Kip Bateman	Rep
17th Legislative District	Bob Smith	Dem	Bob Smith	Dem
18th Legislative District	Barbara Buono	Dem	Barbara Buono	Dem
19th Legislative District	Joe Vitale	Dem	Joe Vitale	Dem
20th Legislative District	Raymond Lesniak	Dem	Raymond Lesniak	Dem
21st Legislative District	Tom Kean Jr.	Rep	Tom Kean Jr.	Rep
22nd Legislative District	Nicholas Scutari	Dem	Nicholas Scutari	Dem
23rd Legislative District	Leonard Lance	Rep	Leonard Lance	Rep
24th Legislative District	Robert Littell	Rep	Steve Oroho	Rep
25th Legislative District	Anthony Bucco	Rep	Anthony Bucco	Rep
26th Legislative District	Robert Martin	Rep	Joe Pennacchio	Rep
27th Legislative District	Richard Codey	Dem	Richard Codey	Dem
28th Legislative District	Ronald Rice	Dem	Ronald Rice	Dem
29th Legislative District	Sharpe James	Dem	Teresa Ruiz	Dem
30th Legislative District	Robert W. Singer	Rep	Robert W. Singer	Rep
31st Legislative District	Vacant (Note: Senator Joseph Doria resigned on October 10, 2007 to become New Jersey Commissioner of Community Affairs.)		Sandra Bolden Cunningham	Dem
32nd Legislative District	Nicholas Sacco	Dem	Nicholas Sacco	Dem
33rd Legislative District	Bernard Kenny	Dem	Brian Stack	Dem
34th Legislative District	Nia Gill	Dem	Nia Gill	Dem
35th Legislative District	John Girgenti	Dem	John Girgenti	Dem
36th Legislative District	Paul Sarlo	Dem	Paul Sarlo	Dem
37th Legislative District	Loretta Weinberg	Dem	Loretta Weinberg	Dem
38th Legislative District	Joseph Coniglio	Dem	Robert M. Gordon	Dem
39th Legislative District	Gerald Cardinale	Rep	Gerald Cardinale	Rep
40th Legislative District	Henry McNamara	Rep	Kevin O'Toole	Rep

=== Close races ===
1. District 12, 7.86% gain

== District 1 ==
New Jersey general election, 2007
Party	Candidate	Votes	%	±%
Democratic	Jeff Van Drew	28,240	55.7%	N/A
Republican	Nicholas Asselta (incumbent)	22,469	44.3%	▼36.6
Total votes		50,709	100.0%	

== District 2 ==
New Jersey general election, 2007
Party	Candidate	Votes	%	±%
Democratic	Jim Whelan	27,913	57.1%	▲20.0
Republican	Sonny McCullough (incumbent)	21,013	42.9%	▼17.1
Total votes		48,926	100.0%	

== District 3 ==
New Jersey general election, 2007
Party	Candidate	Votes	%	±%
Democratic	Stephen M. Sweeney	29,908	57.3%	▲3.3
Republican	Mark Cimino	20,645	39.6%	▼6.4
Get a Grip	William F. Mead	1,635	3.1%	N/A
Total votes		52,188	100.0%	

== District 4 ==
New Jersey general election, 2007
Party	Candidate	Votes	%	±%
Democratic	Fred Madden (incumbent)	21,395	59.8%	▲9.7
Republican	Shelley Lovett	14,364	40.2%	▼9.7
Total votes		35,759	100.0%	

== District 5 ==
New Jersey general election, 2007
Party	Candidate	Votes	%	±%
Democratic	Dana Redd	16,918	62.9%	▼2.0
Republican	Hans Berg	9,983	37.1%	▲2.0
Total votes		26,901	100.0%	

== District 6 ==
New Jersey general election, 2007
Party	Candidate	Votes	%	±%
Democratic	John H. Adler (incumbent)	25,737	61.9%	▲0.9
Republican	Joseph A. Adolf	15,846	38.1%	▼0.9
Total votes		41,583	100.0%	

== District 7 ==
New Jersey general election, 2007
Party	Candidate	Votes	%	±%
Republican	Diane Allen (incumbent)	23,185	55.6%	▼4.7
Democratic	Richard S. Dennison Jr.	18,511	44.4%	▲4.7
Total votes		41,696	100.0%	

== District 8 ==
New Jersey general election, 2007
Party	Candidate	Votes	%	±%
Republican	Phil Haines	28,148	60.9%	▼6.0
Democratic	Francis L. Bodine	18,066	39.1%	▲6.0
Total votes		46,214	100.0%	

== District 9 ==
New Jersey general election, 2007
Party	Candidate	Votes	%	±%
Republican	Christopher J. Connors	35,504	62.3%	▼3.3
Democratic	Russell K. Corby	21,524	37.7%	▲3.3
Total votes		57,028	100.0%	

== District 10 ==
New Jersey general election, 2007
Party	Candidate	Votes	%	±%
Republican	Andrew R. Ciesla (incumbent)	30,164	62.9%	▼2.2
Democratic	Britta Forsberg Wenzel	15,712	32.8%	▼2.1
Libertarian	Jim Miller	2,042	4.3%	N/A
Total votes		47,918	100.0%	

== District 11 ==
New Jersey general election, 2007
Party	Candidate	Votes	%	±%
Republican	Sean T. Kean	28,403	63.3%	▲4.6
Democratic	John A. Villapiano	16,465	36.7%	▲9.3
Total votes		44,868	100.0%	

== District 12 ==
New Jersey general election, 2007
Party	Candidate	Votes	%	±%
Republican	Jennifer Beck	26,743	53.9%	▲11.4
Democratic	Ellen Karcher (incumbent)	22,844	46.1%	▼6.3
Total votes		49,587	100.0%	

== District 13 ==
New Jersey general election, 2007
Party	Candidate	Votes	%	±%
Republican	Joe Kyrillos (incumbent)	25,119	60.7%	▲6.6
Democratic	Leonard L. Inzerillo	16,267	39.3%	▼1.8
Total votes		41,386	100.0%	

== District 14 ==
New Jersey general election, 2007
Party	Candidate	Votes	%	±%
Republican	Bill Baroni	33,207	62.3%	▲3.7
Democratic	Seema Singh	20,081	37.7%	▼1.2
Total votes		53,288	100.0%	

== District 15 ==
New Jersey general election, 2007
Party	Candidate	Votes	%	±%
Democratic	Shirley K. Turner (incumbent)	20,100	62.8%	▼4.6
Republican	Bob Martin	11,924	37.2%	▲4.6
Total votes		32,024	100.0%	

== District 16 ==
New Jersey general election, 2007
Party	Candidate	Votes	%	±%
Republican	Kip Bateman	27,846	61.6%	▼38.4
Democratic	Wayne G. Fox	17,378	38.4%	N/A
Total votes		45,224	100.0%	

== District 17 ==
New Jersey general election, 2007
Party	Candidate	Votes	%	±%
Democratic	Bob Smith (incumbent)	16,898	61.7%	▲0.7
Republican	John Costello	10,506	38.3%	▼0.7
Total votes		27,404	100.0%	

== District 18 ==
New Jersey general election, 2007
Party	Candidate	Votes	%	±%
Democratic	Barbara Buono (incumbent)	21,365	62.4%	▲3.9
Republican	Daniel H. Brown	12,896	37.6%	▼3.9
Total votes		34,261	100.0%	

== District 19 ==
New Jersey general election, 2007
Party	Candidate	Votes	%	±%
Democratic	Joe Vitale (incumbent)	18,864	66.4%	▲0.9
Republican	Donald H. Nelsen Jr.	9,557	33.6%	▼0.9
Total votes		28,421	100.0%	

== District 20 ==
New Jersey general election, 2007
Party	Candidate	Votes	%	±%
Democratic	Raymond Lesniak (incumbent)	9,760	58.7%	▼3.5
Republican	Linda Gaglione	4,478	26.9%	▼9.4
Clean Up Government	Stanley J. Moskal	2,387	14.4%	N/A
Total votes		16,625	100.0%	

== District 21 ==
New Jersey general election, 2007
Party	Candidate	Votes	%	±%
Republican	Thomas H. Kean Jr. (incumbent)	29,795	59.7%	▼7.7
Democratic	Gina Genovese	20,092	40.3%	▲9.9
Total votes		49,887	100.0%	

== District 22 ==
New Jersey general election, 2007
Party	Candidate	Votes	%	±%
Democratic	Nicholas Scutari (incumbent)	14,711	56.9%	▲1.9
Republican	Rose McConnell	11,139	43.1%	▼1.9
Total votes		25,850	100.0%	

== District 23 ==
New Jersey general election, 2007
Party	Candidate	Votes	%	±%
Republican	Leonard Lance (incumbent)	32,198	67.0%	▼1.0
Democratic	Harvey Baron	13,124	27.3%	▼4.7
For State Senate	Daniel Z. Seyler	2,763	5.7%	N/A
Total votes		48,085	100.0%	

== District 24 ==
New Jersey general election, 2007
Party	Candidate	Votes	%	±%
Republican	Steve Oroho	31,143	69.5%	▲1.4
Democratic	Edwin C. Selby	13,694	30.5%	▼1.4
Total votes		44,837	100.0%	

== District 25 ==
New Jersey general election, 2007
Party	Candidate	Votes	%	±%
Republican	Anthony R. Bucco (incumbent)	23,754	61.5%	▲6.4
Democratic	Frank Herbert	14,881	38.5%	▼6.4
Total votes		38,635	100.0	

== District 26 ==
New Jersey general election, 2007
Party	Candidate	Votes	%	±%
Republican	Joe Pennacchio	26,567	66.4%	▲0.4
Democratic	Wasim A. Khan	13,442	33.6%	▼0.4
Total votes		40,009	100.0%	

== District 27 ==
New Jersey general election, 2007
Party	Candidate	Votes	%	±%
Democratic	Richard Codey (incumbent)	23,631	78.8%	▲13.0
Republican	Joseph A. Fischer	6,368	21.2%	▼13.0
Total votes		29,999	100.0%	

== District 28 ==
New Jersey general election, 2007
Party	Candidate	Votes	%	±%
Democratic	Ronald Rice (incumbent)	12,821	77.0%	▲3.6
Republican	Herbert Glenn	3,838	23.0%	▲0.1
Total votes		16,659	100.0%	

== District 29 ==
New Jersey general election, 2007
Party	Candidate	Votes	%	±%
Democratic	Teresa Ruiz (incumbent)	10,816	57.2%	▼25.5
"The People's Choice"	Luis A. Quintana	3,687	19.5%	N/A
Independent-Experienced-Unbossed	William D. Payne	3,653	19.3%	N/A
Republican	Al-Samar Douglas	547	2.9%	N/A
Pro Life Conservative	Dick Hester	123	0.7%	N/A
Socialist Workers	Sara J. Lobman	96	0.5%	▼4.4
Total votes		18,922	100.0%	

== District 30 ==
New Jersey general election, 2007
Party	Candidate	Votes	%	±%
Republican	Robert Singer (incumbent)	23,072	61.6%	▼1.0
Democratic	Steven Morlino	14,365	38.4%	▲1.0
Total votes		37,437	100.0%	

== District 31 ==
New Jersey general election, 2007
Party	Candidate	Votes	%	±%
Democratic	Sandra Bolden Cunningham	10,821	87.7%	▲20.6
Eliminate Primary Elections	Louis Vernotico	1,511	12.3%	N/A
Total votes		12,332	100.0	

== District 32 ==
New Jersey general election, 2007
Party	Candidate	Votes	%	±%
Democratic	Nicholas Sacco (incumbent)	16,780	82.8%	▲5.9
Republican	John Pluchino	3,474	17.2%	▼1.0
Total votes		20,254	100.0%	

== District 33 ==
New Jersey general election, 2007
Party	Candidate	Votes	%	±%
Democratic	Brian P. Stack	20,313	100.0%	▲19.1
Total votes		20,313	100.0%	

== District 34 ==
New Jersey general election, 2007
Party	Candidate	Votes	%	±%
Democratic	Nia Gill (incumbent)	17,178	100.0%	▲30.3
Total votes		17,178	100.0%	

== District 35 ==
New Jersey general election, 2007
Party	Candidate	Votes	%	±%
Democratic	John A. Girgenti	14,265	100.0%	▲31.4
Total votes		14,265	100.0%	

== District 36 ==
New Jersey general election, 2007
Party	Candidate	Votes	%	±%
Democratic	Paul Sarlo (incumbent)	14,895	56.8%	▲3.5
Republican	Michael A. Guarino	11,317	43.2%	▼1.0
Total votes		26,212	100.0%	

== District 37 ==
New Jersey general election, 2007
Party	Candidate	Votes	%	±%
Democratic	Loretta Weinberg (incumbent)	24,118	75.3%	▲2.3
Republican	Clara S. Nibot	7,924	24.7%	▼2.3
Total votes		32,042	100.0%	

== District 38 ==
New Jersey general election, 2007
Party	Candidate	Votes	%	±%
Democratic	Robert M. Gordon	22,351	59.9%	▲4.2
Republican	Robert Colletti	14,949	40.1%	▼4.2
Total votes		37,300	100.0%	

== District 39 ==
New Jersey general election, 2007
Party	Candidate	Votes	%	±%
Republican	Gerald Cardinale (incumbent)	27,623	55.4%	▼6.9
Democratic	Joseph Ariyan	22,272	44.6%	▲6.9
Total votes		48,895	100.0	

== District 40 ==
New Jersey general election, 2007
Party	Candidate	Votes	%	±%
Republican	Kevin J. O'Toole	26,214	66.2%	▲1.7
Democratic	John Zunic	13,395	33.8%	▼1.7
Total votes		39,609	100.0%	

== See also ==
- 2007 New Jersey General Assembly election
