= Alex Sauickie =

Member of the New Jersey General Assembly

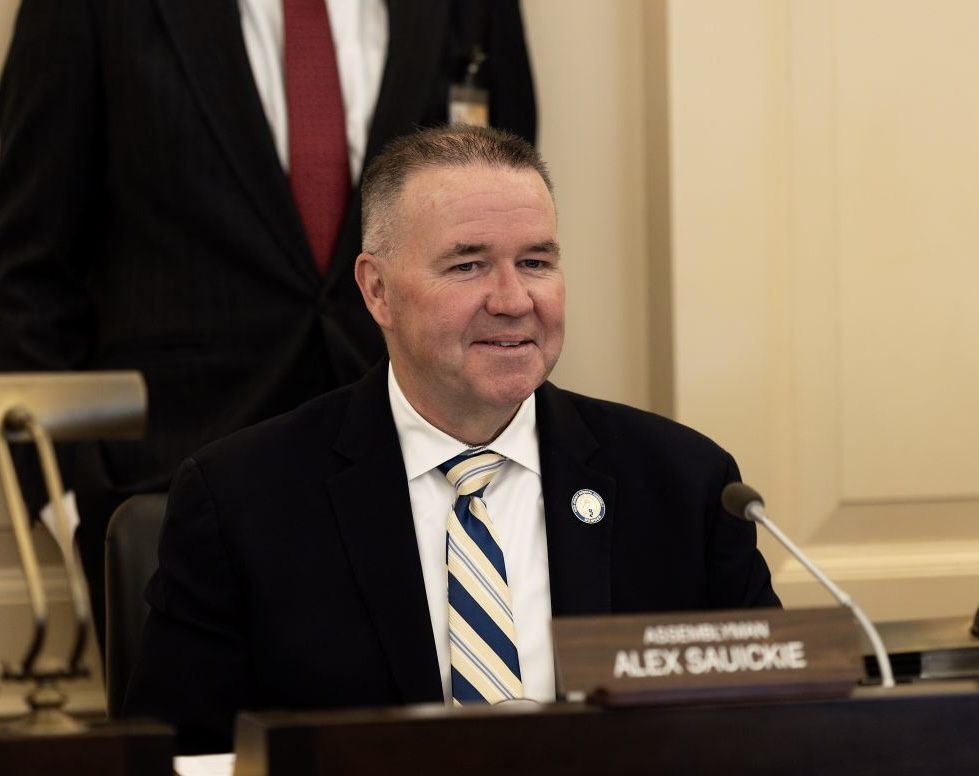
- Sauickie in 2025

Member of the New Jersey General Assembly from the 12th district
- Incumbent
- Assumed office August 11, 2022 Serving with Robert D. Clifton
- Preceded by: Ronald S. Dancer

Member of the Jackson Township Council
- In office January 9, 2019 – August 22, 2022

President of the Jackson Township Council
- In office June 9, 2020 – January 5, 2021
- Preceded by: Barry Calogero
- Succeeded by: Andrew Kern

Vice President of the Jackson Township Council
- In office January 2, 2020 – June 9, 2020
- Preceded by: Barry Calogero
- Succeeded by: Andrew Kern

Personal details
- Pronunciation: Sæwɪcki (Suh-wick-ee)
- Born: Alexander Sauickie III; January 25, 1971 (age 55) Jackson Township, New Jersey, U.S.
- Party: Republican
- Spouse: Margaret Dugan
- Children: 5
- Education: Trenton State College (BS)
- Occupation: Managing Director, The Oasis Group
- Website: Legislative Bio Page; Office Website

Alexander Sauickie III (born January 25, 1971) is an American Republican Party politician who was selected on August 11, 2022, to fill a seat in the New Jersey General Assembly representing New Jersey's 12th legislative district. That seat had been held by Ronald S. Dancer until it was vacated by his death on July 23, 2022.

A resident of Jackson Township, New Jersey, Sauickie served on the Jackson Township Council from January 9, 2019, until he was appointed to the Assembly at a special convention held on August 11, 2022.

Sauickie was elected to fill the unexpired term in the November 8, 2022, general election. The term expires on January 9, 2024, at the conclusion of the 220th New Jersey Legislature. The 221st New Jersey Legislature faces newly drawn state legislative districts by the 2022 New Jersey Apportionment Commission. The 12th Legislative District loses the municipalities of Chesterfield Township, New Hanover Township, and Wrightstown Borough, and gains Helmetta and Spotswood.

== New Jersey General Assembly ==
=== Committees ===
The 222nd Session:

- Agriculture and Natural Resources
- Military and Veterans' Affairs
- Telecommunications and Utilities
- State and Local Government

The 221st Session:

- Commerce, Economic Development, and Agriculture
- Military and Veterans' Affairs
- Telecommunications and Utilities

The 220th Session:

- Agriculture and Food Security
- Military and Veterans' Affairs
- Tourism, Gaming and the Arts

=== NJ Legislative District 12 ===
Each of the 40 districts in the New Jersey Legislature has one representative in the New Jersey Senate and two members in the New Jersey General Assembly. The representatives from the 12th District for the 2025–2026 Legislative Session are:

- Senator Owen Henry (R)
- Assemblyman Robert D. Clifton (R)
- Assemblyman Alex Sauickie (R)

== Electoral history ==
12th Legislative District General Election, 2025
Party	Candidate	Votes	%
Republican	Robert D. Clifton (incumbent)	54,756	31.01
Republican	Alex Sauickie (incumbent)	53,704	30.04
Democratic	Kyler Dineen	34,479	19.53
Democratic	Freshta Taeb	33,597	19.03
Total votes		176,536	100.0
Republican hold			
Republican hold			

12th Legislative District General Election, 2023
Party	Candidate	Votes	%
Republican	Robert D. Clifton (incumbent)	28,200	32.0
Republican	Alex Sauickie (incumbent)	27,061	30.7
Democratic	Paul Sarti	16,767	19.0
Democratic	Raya Arbiol	16,164	18.3
Total votes		88,192	100.0
Republican hold			
Republican hold			

12th Legislative District Special Election, 2022
Party	Candidate	Votes	%
Republican	Alex Sauickie (incumbent)	42,734	61.1
Democratic	Paul Sarti	27,249	38.9
Total votes		69,983	100.0
Republican hold			
