= Clare Farragher =

American politician

Member of the New Jersey General Assembly from the 12th district
- In office February 19, 1987 – January 13, 2004
- Preceded by: Marie Sheehan Muhler
- Succeeded by: Robert Lewis Morgan; Michael J. Panter

Personal details
- Born: December 11, 1941 (age 84) Queens, New York City, New York
- Party: Republican

Clare M. Farragher (born December 11, 1941) is an American Republican Party politician who served in the New Jersey General Assembly from 1987 until 2004 where she represented the 12th Legislative District. She also served as Mayor of Freehold Township.

Farragher attended St. John's University, majoring in Social Sciences. She served on the Freehold Township Committee from 1982 until 1991, serving as its mayor in 1985, as deputy mayor in 1984 and 1988, and as Police Commissioner from 1984 to 1991. She served in the Assembly as Deputy Speaker, and on the Agriculture and Natural Resources Committee, the Appropriations Committee and on the Joint Committee on Automobile Insurance Reform.

She won a special election in February 1987, replacing Assemblywoman Marie Sheehan Muhler, who had resigned from office to take a position with the New Jersey Department of Community Affairs, and was sworn into office on February 19, 1987. She was re-elected, along with incumbent John O. Bennett that November. She was re-elected with Bennett and won again in 1989, 1991, 1993, 1995, 1997, 1999 and 2001 together with Michael Arnone. Democrats Robert Lewis Morgan and running mate Michael J. Panter were elected in 2003, ousting incumbent Republicans Arnone and Farragher.

As chairwoman of the Assembly Insurance Committee, Farragher proposed legislation in June 1992 that would allow drivers to purchase no-frills insurance, that would be available with annual premiums as low as $250, in the hope that it would allow the estimated 500,000 uninsured drivers in New Jersey to have access to affordable coverage for their vehicles. The savings would be achieved by reducing the level of the required personal injury protection coverage from $250,000 to $15,000 and by allowing the deductible for car repairs to be as high as $10,000.

In what The New York Times described as a "food fight", Farragher argued in 2003 that the tomato has a strong historical association with the Garden State and that "the Jersey tomato does have a unique taste" that derives from the characteristics of the soil on the Atlantic coast. Legislation ultimately passed in 2003 establishing the blueberry as New Jersey's official state fruit.
