= Owen Henry =

American politician from New Jersey

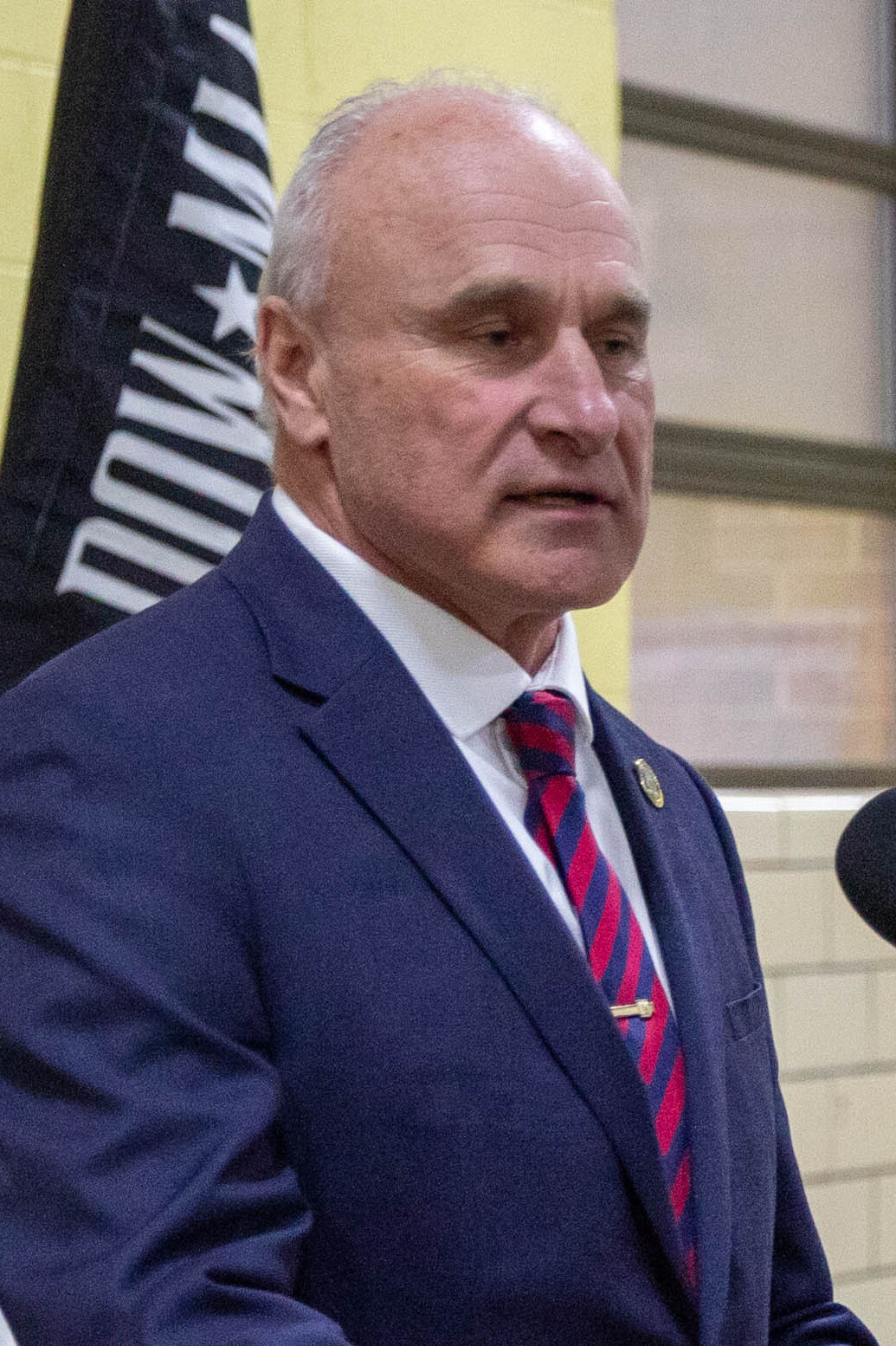

Member of the New Jersey Senate from the 12th district
- Incumbent
- Assumed office January 9, 2024
- Preceded by: Samuel D. Thompson

Personal details
- Born: May 30, 1959 (age 66)
- Party: Republican
- Education: The College of New Jersey
- Website: Legislative webpage

Owen Henry (born May 30, 1959) is an American Republican Party politician serving as a member of the New Jersey Senate for the 12th legislative district, having taken office on January 9, 2024.

== Biography ==
Henry was born in Hoboken, New Jersey, and moved in 1961 to Old Bridge Township, New Jersey. He graduated from Cedar Ridge High School (since merged with Old Bridge High School) in 1977 and Trenton State College (since renamed as The College of New Jersey) in 1981. He is the owner of Owen Henry Contracting, Inc., an industrial building construction company.

== Elective office ==
Henry served on the board of education of the Old Bridge Township Public Schools from 2009 to 2011 and served as mayor of Old Bridge from 2012 to 2023.

With Senator Samuel D. Thompson retiring from the Senate after having switched parties from Republican to Democratic, Senator Henry's election flipped District 12 back to the Republicans. He defeated Democratic challenger Brandon Rose by a vote of 28,038 (62.2%) to 16,265 (36.1%) in the 2023 New Jersey Senate election, with independent candidate Nina Jochnowitz collecting 806 votes. Henry was one of 10 members elected for the first time in 2023 to serve in the Senate, one quarter of all seats.

=== Committees ===
Committee assignments for the 2024—2025 Legislative Session are:

- Education
- Health, Human Services and Senior Citizens
- Law and Public Safety

=== District 12 ===
Each of the 40 districts in the New Jersey Legislature has one representative in the New Jersey Senate and two members in the New Jersey General Assembly. The representatives from the 12th District for the 2024—2025 Legislative Session are:

- Senator Owen Henry (R)
- Assemblyman Robert D. Clifton (R)
- Assemblyman Alex Sauickie (R)

== Electoral history ==
=== Senate ===
12th Legislative District General Election, 2023
Party	Candidate	Votes	%
Republican	Owen Henry	28,038	62.2
Democratic	Brandon A. Rose	16,265	36.1
Results Not Politics	Nina Jochnowitz	806	1.8
Total votes		45,109	100.0
Republican gain from Democratic			
