= Ronald S. Dancer =

American politician (1949–2022)

Member of the New Jersey General Assembly from the 12th district
- In office January 10, 2012 – July 23, 2022 Serving with Robert D. Clifton
- Preceded by: Caroline Casagrande; Declan O'Scanlon

Member of the New Jersey General Assembly from the 30th district
- In office November 18, 2002 – January 10, 2012 Serving with Joseph R. Malone
- Preceded by: Melvin Cottrell
- Succeeded by: Sean T. Kean; Dave Rible

Deputy Minority Leader of the New Jersey General Assembly
- In office January 9, 2018 – July 23, 2022
- Leader: Jon Bramnick
- Preceded by: Office Established

Mayor of Plumsted Township, New Jersey
- In office January 1, 1990 – December 31, 2011
- Succeeded by: Dave Leutwyler

Personal details
- Born: Ronald Stanley Dancer; May 31, 1949 Trenton, New Jersey, U.S.
- Died: July 23, 2022 (aged 73) Philadelphia, Pennsylvania, U.S.
- Party: Republican
- Spouse: Brenda Dancer
- Children: 2
- Education: Wesley College (Business Administration); Rutgers University
- Website: www.njleg.state.nj.us/legislative-roster/352/assemblyman-dancer

Ronald Stanley Dancer (May 31, 1949 – July 23, 2022) was an American Republican Party politician. He spent nearly 20 years in the New Jersey General Assembly, initially representing the 30th legislative district between 2002 and 2012. He later redistricted to the 12th legislative district in 2012, serving until his death in 2022.

== Early life ==
Dancer was born on May 31, 1949, to Rachel Young and Stanley Dancer, the latter of whom was a professional harness racer. He attended the Peddie School, Wesley College (majoring in Business Administration) and the Edward J. Bloustein School of Planning and Public Policy at Rutgers University. He also served in the United States Army from 1969 to 1971. In 1970 Ronald became the youngest driver ever to compete in harness racing’s Hambletonian.

== Mayor of Plumsted ==
Dancer's first elected office was serving on the Plumsted Township committee. He was chosen as mayor in 1990 and continued to be selected for one-year terms until 2011 when he retired from the committee. He has served on the Ocean County Board of Social Services since 1997 (as Chair), the Ocean County Natural Lands and Farmland Preservation Advisory Committee since 1998 and the Ocean County Senior Services Advisory Council since 2002. He was on the New Jersey Horse Racing Commission from 1999 to 2002. After retiring as mayor, he served as the business administrator for Plumsted Township. For a period of time, he held two elected positions—Plumsted Township committeeperson and Assemblyman. This dual position, often called double dipping, was allowed under a grandfather clause in the state law enacted by the New Jersey Legislature and signed into law by Governor of New Jersey Jon Corzine in September 2007 that prevented dual-office-holding but allows those who had held both positions as of February 1, 2008, to retain both posts.

== New Jersey Assembly ==
In November 2002, Republican County Committee representatives from the 30th Legislative District (which at the time was made up of portions of Burlington, Mercer, Monmouth, and Ocean counties) chose Dancer to fill the vacancy created by Melvin Cottrell's death; Dancer defeated Howell Township Councilmember Joseph DiBella by a 106–72 margin. He had been re-elected to two year terms four times from the 30th District before winning twice from the 12th District.

=== Committees ===
- Agriculture and Natural Resources
- Military and Veterans' Affairs
- Oversight, Reform and Federal Relations
- Tourism, Gaming and the Arts

=== District 12 ===
Each of the 40 districts in the New Jersey Legislature has one representative in the New Jersey Senate and two members in the New Jersey General Assembly. The representatives from the 12th District for the 2022—23 Legislative Session are:

- Senator Samuel D. Thompson (R)
- Assemblyman Robert D. Clifton (R)
- Assemblyman Ronald S. Dancer (R)

== Personal life and death ==
Dancer and his wife, Brenda, had two children, and lived in New Egypt, New Jersey. He died at the Hospital of the University of Pennsylvania in Philadelphia on July 23, 2022, at the age of 73.

== Electoral history ==
=== Assembly District 12 ===
30th Legislative District General Election, 2021
Party	Candidate	Votes	%
Republican	Sean T. Kean (incumbent)	54,541	36.76%
Republican	Ned Thomson (incumbent)	52,678	35.50%
Democratic	Stephen Dobbins	20,800	14.02%
Democratic	Matthew Filosa	20,366	13.73%
Total votes		148,385	100.0
Republican hold			

30th Legislative District General Election, 2019
Party	Candidate	Votes	%
Republican	Sean Kean (incumbent)	24,810	36.35%
Republican	Ned Thomson (incumbent)	23,078	33.82%
Democratic	Steven Farkas	9,781	14.33%
Democratic	Jason Celik	9,391	13.76%
The Other Candidate	Hank Schroeder	1,186	1.74%
Total votes		68,246	100%
Republican hold			

New Jersey general election, 2017
Party	Candidate	Votes	%	±%
Republican	Ronald S. Dancer	30,348	29.3	▼0.2
Republican	Robert D. Clifton	29,610	28.5	▲0.5
Democratic	Gene Davis	21,441	20.7	▲0.3
Democratic	Nirav Patel	20,397	19.7	▼0.6
Libertarian	Anthony J. Storrow	1,016	1.0	N/A
Libertarian	Daniel A. Krause	938	0.9	N/A
Total votes		'103,750'	'100.0'	

New Jersey general election, 2015
Party	Candidate	Votes	%	±%
Republican	Ronald S. Dancer	15,164	29.5	▼3.3
Republican	Robert D. Clifton	14,433	28.0	▼3.7
Democratic	David W. Merwin	10,496	20.4	▲2.9
Democratic	Robert P. Kurzydlowski	10,449	20.3	▲3.7
Green	Stephen N. Zielinski Sr.	945	1.8	N/A
Total votes		'51,487'	'100.0'	

New Jersey general election, 2013
Party	Candidate	Votes	%	±%
Republican	Ronald S. Dancer	32,188	32.8	▲2.5
Republican	Robert D. Clifton	31,059	31.7	▲2.6
Democratic	Lawrence J. Furman	17,119	17.5	▼2.9
Democratic	Nicholas Nellegar	16,312	16.6	▼3.7
For the People	Diane Bindler	1,354	1.4	N/A
Total votes		'98,032'	'100.0'	

New Jersey general election, 2011
Party	Candidate	Votes	%
Republican	Ronald S. Dancer	22,345	30.3
Republican	Robert D. Clifton	21,469	29.1
Democratic	William "Bill" Spedding	15,077	20.4
Democratic	Catherine Tinney Rome	14,969	20.3
Total votes		73,860	100.0

=== Assembly District 30 ===
New Jersey general election, 2009
Party	Candidate	Votes	%	±%
Republican	Joseph R. Malone, III	47,325	36.6	▲5.0
Republican	Ronald S. Dancer	45,901	35.5	▲4.8
Democratic	John Kocubinski	18,400	14.2	▼4.8
Democratic	William "Bill" Spedding	17,836	13.8	▼4.9
Write-In	Personal choice	8	0.01	N/A
Total votes		'129,470'	'100.0'	

New Jersey general election, 2007
Party	Candidate	Votes	%	±%
Republican	Joseph R. Malone III	23,120	31.6	▼1.0
Republican	Ronald S. Dancer	22,477	30.7	▼1.4
Democratic	Sharon Atkinson	13,906	19.0	▲1.7
Democratic	Jeffrey Williamson	13,657	18.7	▲0.7
Total votes		'73,160'	'100.0'	

New Jersey general election, 2005
Party	Candidate	Votes	%	±%
Republican	Joseph R. Malone III	36,286	32.6	▼0.4
Republican	Ronald S. Dancer	35,794	32.1	▲0.6
Democratic	Jeffrey Williamson	20,053	18.0	▼0.6
Democratic	Marvin Krakower	19,235	17.3	▲0.4
Total votes		'111,368'	'100.0'	

New Jersey general election, 2003
Party	Candidate	Votes	%	±%
Republican	Joseph R. Malone	25,497	33.0	▲2.4
Republican	Ronald S. Dancer	24,355	31.5	▲1.9
Democratic	Joseph D. Grisanti	14,347	18.6	▼2.1
Democratic	Mitchel Dolobowsky	13,031	16.9	▼2.2
Total votes		'77,230'	'100.0'	

New Jersey General Assembly
Preceded by Caroline Casagrande; Declan O'Scanlon	Member of the New Jersey General Assembly for the 12th District; January 12, 2012 – July 23, 2022; With: Robert D. Clifton	Succeeded by Vacant
Preceded by Melvin Cottrell	Member of the New Jersey General Assembly for the 30th District; November 18, 2002 – January 10, 2012; With: Joseph R. Malone	Succeeded by Sean T. Kean; Dave Rible
Political offices
Preceded by ?	Mayor of Plumsted Township, New Jersey; January 1, 1990 – December 31, 2011	Succeeded by Dave Leutwyler
