= Ellen Karcher =

American politician (born 1964)

Ellen Karcher (born February 28, 1964) is an American Democratic Party politician, who served in the New Jersey State Senate from 2004 until 2008, where she represented the 12th Legislative District.

Karcher graduated magna cum laude with a B.A. from Rutgers University with a double major in English and Political Science. She received an M.A. from the Eagleton Institute of Politics at Rutgers University in Political Science and Public Policy. Karcher is a Ph.D. Candidate at Rutgers University in Political Science. As an undergraduate, Karcher was elected to the Phi Beta Kappa honor society and was selected as a Henry Rutgers Scholar, a program designed to bring graduate level work to undergrads. During her masters studies, in addition to teaching undergraduate courses, she was named an Eagleton Fellow. She was elected to the second class of Rodel Fellows at the Aspen Institute.

Karcher is a medical policy and research advisor. She was an adjunct professor at Rutgers University where she taught courses in mass media and politics, mass political behavior, Congress and the Presidency. She is affiliated with the American Political Science Association as well as a section member of State Politics and Policy.

Karcher served on the Marlboro Township Council from 2002 to 2004, where she was Council President. In the 2003 election, she defeated incumbent Republican Senate Co-President John O. Bennett III, who had been the subject of ethics scandals. Karcher served on the Health, Human Services and Senior Citizens Committee (Vice Chair); the Wagering, Tourism and Historic Preservation Committee (Vice Chair); the Transportation Committee; and the Joint Legislative Committee on Government Consolidation and Shared Services. Karcher is the third generation of her family to have served in the New Jersey Legislature. She learned New Jersey politics from her father, Alan Karcher, who served in the Assembly from 1973 to 1990 and as Speaker of the Assembly from 1982 to 1985. Her grandfather, Joseph T. Karcher, served in the Assembly from 1930 to 1933. In the 2007 general election, Karcher lost her bid for another term to Republican candidate Jennifer Beck.

Since 2008, Karcher has owned and operated a lavender farm in Monmouth County, NJ

New Jersey Senate
Preceded by John O. Bennett	Member of the New Jersey Senate from the 12th district 2004–2008	Succeeded by Jennifer Beck
