= Robert Lewis Morgan =

American politician

Robert Lewis Morgan (born January 5, 1952) is an American Democratic Party politician who served in the New Jersey General Assembly for one term from 2004 to 2006, where he represented the 12th legislative district.

Morgan served in the Assembly on the Education and the Health and Human Services Committees.

Morgan and running mate Michael J. Panter were elected in 2003, ousting incumbent Republicans Michael Arnone and Clare Farragher .

In results from balloting on Election Day, November 8, 2005, in the 12th district, covering portions of Monmouth and Mercer counties, Republican challenger Jennifer Beck had an edge of over 1,000 votes for one of the two seats in the district. In early results, fewer than three hundred votes had separated Republican challenger Declan O'Scanlon and the one-term incumbent Democrats Robert Lewis Morgan and Michael J. Panter, leaving the race too close to call with O'Scanlon leading by just over 100 votes. The final tally had Panter retaining his seat by a 73-vote margin over O'Scanlon and Morgan in fourth place, falling short in his bid for re-election.

Morgan served on the Little Silver School District Board of Education as Vice President and on the Red Bank Regional High School Board of Education, also as President, a regional district that serves students in Little Silver, Red Bank and Shrewsbury. He has also served as President of both the Monmouth County Tuberculosis Control Board and the Monmouth County Infectious Disease Control Committee.

Morgan holds faculty positions at the Robert Wood Johnson Medical School and the School of Public Health at the University of Medicine and Dentistry of New Jersey, as well as the Department of Human Ecology at Rutgers University.

Morgan received an A.B. from Cornell University, an M.A. from the Columbia University School of International and Public Affairs, an M.P.H. from the Columbia University School of Public Health, was awarded an M.D. from the St. George's University School of Medicine and is a Doctoral Candidate at Columbia University in Epidemiology.
