= Caroline Casagrande =

American government official

Member of the New Jersey General Assembly from the 11th district
- In office January 10, 2012 – January 12, 2016 Serving with Mary Pat Angelini
- Preceded by: Dave Rible
- Succeeded by: Joann Downey; Eric Houghtaling

Member of the New Jersey General Assembly from the 12th district
- In office January 8, 2008 – January 10, 2012 Serving with Declan O'Scanlon
- Preceded by: Jennifer Beck; Michael J. Panter
- Succeeded by: Ronald S. Dancer; Robert D. Clifton

Personal details
- Born: November 21, 1976 (age 49) Point Pleasant, New Jersey, U.S.
- Party: Republican
- Spouse: Stephen Chance
- Education: Rutgers School of Law–Camden, J.D. Pennsylvania State University, B.S.

Caroline Casagrande (born November 21, 1976) is an attorney and former American government official and political appointee in the administration of President Donald J. Trump who served as Deputy Assistant Secretary of State for Academic Programs at the U.S. Department of State overseeing global public diplomacy programs. Earlier, Casagrande served as a Deputy Republican leader in the New Jersey General Assembly, representing the 11th Legislative District, from 2012 to 2016 and the 12th legislative district from 2008 to 2012. Casagrande is the youngest woman assembly member ever elected in New Jersey.

== Early life and family ==
Casagrande was born in Point Pleasant, and grew up in nearby Spring Lake. She graduated from Red Bank Catholic High School, in Red Bank, New Jersey.

While in college, Casagrande worked in the new democratic government of South Africa during her time studying at the University of Kwa-Zulu Natal-Pietermaritzburg. Later, she was awarded a Juris Doctor from Rutgers School of Law–Camden.

Casagrande lives in Arlington, VA with her husband, Stephen Chance, and three children.

== Education ==
Casagrande earned a B.S. degree from Pennsylvania State University majoring in Political Science. She was elected as Undergraduate Student Government President, where she worked to reduce the cost of student transportation around campus, improve student health care services, and protect students from dramatic tuition increases. In 2010 and 2015 respectively, Pennsylvania State University awarded Casagrande the Young Alumni Achievement Award as well as the Young Alumni Political Science Award.

Casagrande is a double-alumni of the Bureau of Educational and Cultural Affairs. She was an American Council for Young Political Leaders (ACYPL) delegate to Nepal in 2009. In 2015, Casagrande was awarded the ACYPL fellowship to the East-West Center to study India with parliamentarians from Asia.

== Career ==
=== Legal ===
Casagrande was a partner and attorney with the law firm of Menna, Supko & Casagrande in Shrewsbury, N.J. Previously, she worked as a litigation associate for the firm Cleary, Alfieri Jones & Hoyle (now Cleary, Giacobbe, Alfieri, & Jacobs). Casagrande has also served as municipal attorney to Manalapan Township and special counsel to Fair Haven. After graduating from law school, she clerked for New Jersey Superior Court Judge Robert O'Hagan.

=== New Jersey General Assembly ===
In 2007, Casagrande ran on the Republican ticket for New Jersey State Assemblywoman of the 12th district alongside Declan O'Scanlon. Casagrande defeated O'Scanlon defeated Democratic incumbent Assemblyman Michael J. Panter and his running mate Amy Mallet. Casagrande thus became the youngest woman to ever be elected to the New Jersey General Assembly. She served in the Assembly on the Appropriations Committee and the Women and Children Committee.

In 2011 Casagrande was redistricted to the 11th Legislative District where she sought re-election along with Senator Jennifer Beck, who was also shifted out of the 12th district, and Assembly member Mary Pat Angelini. They were the first trio of women to be elected as a team to the New Jersey Legislature.

Casagrande served in various leadership positions within the Republican Caucus - eventually rising to Deputy Republican Leader. She also served as a Republican Commissioner on the New Jersey Redistricting Commission, which was charged with redrawing the lines of the State's congressional districts following the 2010 United States census.

Casagrande lost her 2015 bid for re-election to Democratic challengers Joann Downey and Eric Houghtaling. Casagrande finished fourth among the four major party candidates behind Houghtaling, Downey and her Republican running mate, Mary Pat Angelini.

=== United States Department of State ===
Starting in April 2018, Casagrande entered the U.S. Department of State as a political appointee of the Trump Administration as the Special Advisor to Assistant Secretary Marie Royce in the Bureau of Educational and Cultural Affairs.

Casagrande was sworn into the position of Deputy Assistant Secretary of Academic Programs in September 2018 with the responsibility of shaping policy across the interagency and stewarding resources in excess of $400 million. In this role, Casagrande oversaw the flagship Fulbright Scholarship program, the Education USA Network of 435 global recruitment centers, 630 overseas American Spaces, State Department sponsored English language education programming, the Humphrey Fellowship, Gilman Scholarships, undergraduate exchanges, and teacher exchanges.

Casagrande also served on the National Security Education Board.

As the Deputy Assistant Secretary for Academic Programs, Casagrande promoted the message that the United States welcomes international students when questioned if the Trump administration's immigration policy had led to a decrease in foreign enrollment at US universities.

Casagrande's State Department appointment ended with President Trump's term on January 20, 2021.

==== Countries visited to promote US academics for international students ====
- India, March 2019.
- Colombia, May 2019.
- Bahamas, May 2019.
- Brazil, August 2019.
- China, September 2019.
- Austria, December 2019.
- Italy, December 2019.
- Mexico, January 2020.

=== Rutgers University ===
Casagrande was a Visiting Associate of the Rutgers-Eagleton Institute of Politics until 2019.

In 2018, Casagrande was featured in a Rutgers television commercial about training women running for public office.
