= Michael Arnone =

American politician (1932–2024)

Member of the New Jersey General Assembly from the 12th district
- In office June 14, 1989 – January 13, 2004
- Preceded by: John O. Bennett
- Succeeded by: Robert Lewis Morgan; Michael J. Panter

Mayor of Red Bank, New Jersey
- In office 1978–1990
- Preceded by: Daniel Joseph O'Hern
- Succeeded by: Edward J. McKenna, Jr.

Personal details
- Born: September 10, 1932 Red Bank, New Jersey, U.S.
- Died: July 1, 2024 (aged 91)
- Party: Republican
- Spouse: Barbara
- Children: 5
- Education: Seton Hall University (BS); Temple University (DDS)

Michael John Arnone (September 10, 1932 – July 1, 2024) was an American Republican Party politician who served in the New Jersey General Assembly from 1989 to 2004, where he represented the 12th legislative district.

== Background ==
Born in Red Bank, New Jersey, Arnone attended Red Bank Catholic High School before attending St. Francis College. Arnone graduated from Seton Hall University with a BS and received his DDS from the Temple University School of Dentistry.

Arnone died on July 1, 2024, at the age of 91.

== Political career ==
Arnone was the Mayor of Red Bank, New Jersey from 1978 to 1990, was the Red Bank Fire and Police Commissioner from 1970 to 1973 served on the Red Bank Council from 1969 to 1973 and as the borough's Zoning Board Chair in 1969. Arnone served in the United States Army from 1959 to 61, attaining the rank of captain.

Arnone served in the Assembly on the Housing & Local Government Committee.

Arnone and fellow-Republican running mate Clare Farragher were defeated in the 2003 elections by Democrats Michael J. Panter and Robert Lewis Morgan.
