= Jennifer Beck =

American Republican Party politician

Member of the New Jersey Senate
- In office January 8, 2008 – January 9, 2018
- Preceded by: Ellen Karcher
- Succeeded by: Vin Gopal
- Constituency: 12th district (2008-2012); 11th district (2012-2018)

Member of the New Jersey General Assembly from the 12th district
- In office January 10, 2006 – January 8, 2008
- Preceded by: Robert Lewis Morgan
- Succeeded by: Caroline Casagrande; Declan O'Scanlon

Personal details
- Born: January 3, 1967 (age 59) Erie, Pennsylvania, U.S.
- Party: Republican
- Education: University of Pennsylvania, M.A. Boston College, B.A.

Jennifer Beck (born January 3, 1967) is an American Republican Party politician who served in the New Jersey State Senate representing the 11th Legislative District from 2012 to 2018. Prior to redistricting, she served in the Senate from 2008 to 2012 representing the 12th Legislative District, serving portions of Monmouth and Mercer counties. Beck represented the 12th District in the New Jersey General Assembly from 2006 to 2008.

== Political career ==
Beck is a former Republican Party fundraiser who served for six years on the Red Bank Borough Council, from 1999 to 2005. She holds a B.A. from Boston College (Physics and Mathematics) and was awarded an M.A. from the University of Pennsylvania (Government Administration). Beck is also an alumna of the Fels Institute of Government at the University of Pennsylvania.

Beck won a very close Assembly election on November 8, 2005. As of December 6, 2005, she was declared winner of one of the seats, and was the top vote getter in the District with 31,418 votes. Democratic freshman Assemblyman Michael J. Panter won re-election with 30,466 votes, narrowly edging Beck's running mate, Declan O'Scanlon, who had 30,401 votes, just 65 fewer than Panter. One-term incumbent Robert Lewis Morgan lost his bid for re-election, coming in fourth with 30,228 votes. Two Green Party candidates each received about 2,000 votes. While in the Assembly, Beck served on the Judiciary Committee, the State Government Committee and the Wagering, Tourism & Historic Preservation Committee.

In the 2007 general election, Beck won her bid for a seat in the New Jersey Senate, defeating incumbent Democrat Ellen Karcher despite being outspent by a nearly 7-to-1 margin. For the 2011 elections, Beck was moved into the 11th District where she beat Democrat Raymond Santiago by over 13 points. She was subsequently re-elected by over 21 points in 2013 beating Democrat Michael Brantley and independent Marie E. Amato-Juckiewicz. Beck served on the Joint Committee on Economic Justice and Equal Employment Opportunity, the Budget and Appropriations Committee, and the Community and Urban Affairs Committee.

In November 2008, a petition was launched to urge the 2009 Republican nominee for Governor of New Jersey to select Beck as his/her lieutenant governor. Nevertheless, on July 20, 2009, nominee Chris Christie announced that he had chosen Kimberly Guadagno, Monmouth County sheriff, to complete his campaign ticket as a candidate for lieutenant governor.

Described by NJ.com as "perhaps the biggest upset of the night", Beck lost her bid for re-election in 2017 to Democratic challenger Vin Gopal, in what was the third-most expensive of the 120 legislative races statewide, with total spending in excess of $4 million. The district had been represented only by Republicans since 1992. With the addition of heavily Democratic communities like Asbury Park in the 2011 apportionment, Democrats gained a 32%-23% margin over Republicans in numbers of registered voters. Democrats Joann Downey and Eric Houghtaling won the two Assembly seats in 2015 and Gopal's win over Beck by an Election Day count of 28,750 votes to 25,108 put all three District 11 seats in the hands of Democrats.

=== Election history ===
11th Legislative District general election
Party	Candidate	Votes	%	±%
Democratic	Vin Gopal	31,308	53.6	▲14.8
Republican	Jennifer Beck (incumbent)	27,150	46.4	▼13.6
Total votes		58,458	100.0	
Democratic gain from Republican				

New Jersey State Senate elections, 2013
Party	Candidate	Votes	%
Republican	Jennifer Beck (incumbent)	30,531	60.0
Democratic	Michael Brantley	19,735	38.8
For the People	Marie E. Amato-Juckiewicz	599	1.2
Republican hold			

New Jersey State Senate elections, 2011
Party	Candidate	Votes	%
Republican	Jennifer Beck (incumbent)	20,226	56.6
Democratic	Raymond Santiago	15,487	43.4
Republican hold			

New Jersey State Senate elections, 2007
Party	Candidate	Votes	%
Republican	Jennifer Beck	26,743	53.9
Democratic	Ellen Karcher (incumbent)	22,844	46.1
Republican gain from Democratic			

New Jersey General Assembly elections, 2005
Party	Candidate	Votes	%
Republican	Jennifer Beck	31,418	24.8
Democratic	Michael J. Panter (incumbent)	30,466	24.0
Republican	Declan O'Scanlon	30,401	24.0
Democratic	Robert Lewis Morgan (incumbent)	30,228	23.8
Green	Ann Napolitano	2,303	1.8
Green	Judith Stanton	2,052	1.6

New Jersey Senate
Preceded by Sean T. Kean	Member of the New Jersey Senate for the 11th District; January 10, 2012 – January 9, 2018	Succeeded by Vin Gopal
Preceded by Ellen Karcher	Member of the New Jersey Senate for the 12th District; January 8, 2008 – January 10, 2012	Succeeded by Samuel D. Thompson
New Jersey General Assembly
Preceded by Robert Lewis Morgan	Member of the New Jersey General Assembly for the 12th District; January 10, 2006 – January 8, 2008; With: Michael J. Panter	Succeeded by Caroline Casagrande; Declan O'Scanlon
