= New Jersey's 12th legislative district =

American legislative district

- Senator: Owen Henry (R)
- Assembly members: Robert D. Clifton (R); Alex Sauickie (R)
- Registration: 35.86% Republican; 25.89% Democratic; 37.13% unaffiliated
- Demographics: 72.6% White; 6.8% Black/African American; 0.3% Native American; 8.3% Asian; 0.0% Hawaiian/Pacific Islander; 4.0% Other race; 7.9% Two or more races; 11.9% Hispanic
- Population: 230,971
- Voting-age population: 182,139
- Registered voters: 167,202

New Jersey's 12th legislative district is one of 40 in the state, covering the Burlington County municipalities of North Hanover Township; the Middlesex County municipalities of Helmetta, Old Bridge Township, and Spotswood; the Monmouth County municipalities of Allentown Borough, Englishtown Borough, Manalapan Township, Matawan Borough, Millstone Township, Roosevelt Borough and Upper Freehold Township; and the Ocean County municipalities of Jackson Township and Plumsted Township.

== Demographic characteristics ==
As of the 2020 United States census, the district had a population of 230,971, of whom 182,139 (78.9%) were of voting age. The racial makeup of the district was 167,675 (72.6%) White, 15,755 (6.8%) African American, 625 (0.3%) Native American, 19,231 (8.3%) Asian, 105 (0.0%) Pacific Islander, 9,349 (4.0%) from some other race, and 18,231 (7.9%) from two or more races. Hispanic or Latino of any race were 27,497 (11.9%) of the population.

The district had 176,467 registered voters as of February 1, 2025, of whom 68,820 (39.0%) were registered as unaffiliated, 60,269 (34.2%) were registered as Republicans, 45,288 (25.7%) were registered as Democrats, and 2,090 (1.2%) were registered to other parties.

== Political representation ==
For the 2026–2027 session, the 12th legislative district of the New Jersey Legislature is represented in the State Senate by Owen Henry (R, Old Bridge Township) and in the General Assembly by Robert D. Clifton (R, Matawan) and Alex Sauickie (R, Jackson Township).

The legislative district overlaps with New Jersey's 3rd, 4th, 6th and 12th congressional districts.

== 1965–1973 ==
In the interim period between the 1964 Supreme Court decision Reynolds v. Sims which required the creation of state legislature districts to be made as equal in population as possible and the 1973 creation of the 40-district map, the 12th district consisted of all of Hudson County. Senators were elected at-large in the 12th district; three members of the Senate were elected in the 1965 and 1971 elections for a two-year term and four Senators were elected for the four-year term elected in the 1967 elections. From 1967 until 1971, the 12th Senate district was split into four Assembly districts with each district electing two members. For the final election held under the interim measures, the 12th Senate district was split into three Assembly districts each electing two members and an additional Assembly member elected at-large by the entire county.

The members elected to the Senate from this district are as follows:

Session	Senators elected				
1966–1967	3	William Musto (D)	William F. Kelly (D)	Frank Joseph Guarini (D)	
1968–1969	4	William Musto (D)	Frank Joseph Guarini (D)	William F. Kelly (D)	Frederick H. Hauser (D)
1970–1971	4	William Musto (D)	Frank Joseph Guarini (D)	William F. Kelly (D)	Frederick H. Hauser (D)
1972–1973	3	William Musto (D)	James P. Dugan (D)	William F. Kelly (D)	

The members elected to the Assembly from each district are as follows:

Session	District 12A	District 12B	District 12C	District 12D	District 12 at-large
1968–1969	John J. Fekety (D)	Alfred E. Suminski (D)	Michael P. Esposito (D)	Theodore DiGiammo (D)	
1968–1969	Addison McLeon (D)	David Friedland (D)	Christopher Jackman (D)	Norman A. Doyle (D)	
1970–1971	Joseph A. LeFante (D)	Alfred E. Suminski (D) (Note: Died February 5, 1971)	Frank R. Conwell (D) (Note: Died August 10, 1971)	Joseph M. Healey (D)	
1970–1971	James P. Dugan (D)	David Friedland (D)	Michael P. Esposito (D)	Christopher Jackman (D)	
1972–1973	Joseph A. LeFante (D)	Michael P. Esposito (D)	Christopher Jackman (D)	Seat eliminated	David Friedland (D)
1972–1973	David Wallace (D)	William G. Wilkerson (D)	Silvio Failla (D) (Note: Murdered on September 16, 1972)	Seat eliminated	David Friedland (D)
1972–1973	David Wallace (D)	William G. Wilkerson (D)	Thomas Gallo (D) (Note: Elected in special election on January 8, 1973; seated January 15, 1973)	Seat eliminated	David Friedland (D)

== District composition since 1973 ==
When the 40-district legislative map was created in 1973, the 12th district first included the Middlesex County townships of Monroe Township and Madison (now Old Bridge) and the northern Monmouth County municipalities of Matawan borough and township (the latter now Aberdeen), Keyport, Union Beach, Keansburg, Middletown Township, and Red Bank. For the 1981 redistricting, almost the entire district was changed, only retaining Red Bank from the previous map. It consisted of all of western Monmouth County and some boroughs of northeastern Monmouth including Tinton Falls, Rumson, and West Long Branch. In the 1991 redistricting, the total area of the district was reduced as the four panhandle municipalities of western Monmouth and some of the boroughs on the east side of the district were shifted to other districts. The district became a long, narrow district in an east–west fashion in the 2001 redistricting stretching from Oceanport through the central Monmouth townships, and continuing into East Windsor and Hightstown in Mercer County. Following the 2011 redistricting, the district boundaries experienced yet another major change when it became composed of municipalities from four counties, Burlington, Ocean, Monmouth, and Middlesex.

== Election history ==
Session	Senate	General Assembly	
1974–1975	Eugene J. Bedell (D)	Bill Flynn (D)	Richard Van Wagner (D)
1976–1977	Eugene J. Bedell (D)	Bill Flynn (D)	Richard Van Wagner (D)
1978–1979	Eugene J. Bedell (D)	Bill Flynn (D)	Richard Van Wagner (D)
1980–1981	Eugene J. Bedell (D)	Bill Flynn (D)	Richard Van Wagner (D)
1982–1983	S. Thomas Gagliano (R)	Marie Sheehan Muhler (R)	John O. Bennett (R)
1984–1985	S. Thomas Gagliano (R)	Marie Sheehan Muhler (R)	John O. Bennett (R)
1986–1987	S. Thomas Gagliano (R)	Marie Sheehan Muhler (R) (Note: Resigned October 20, 1986 to join Department of Community Affairs)	John O. Bennett (R)
1986–1987	S. Thomas Gagliano (R)	Clare Farragher (R) (Note: Elected in a February 3, 1987 special election, sworn in on February 19)	John O. Bennett (R)
1988–1989	S. Thomas Gagliano (R) (Note: Resigned May 1, 1989 to become director of New Jersey Transit)	Clare Farragher (R)	John O. Bennett (R) (Note: Appointed to the Senate on May 22, 1989, elected to complete the unexpired term in November 1989 special election)
1988–1989	John O. Bennett (R)	Clare Farragher (R)	Michael Arnone (R) (Note: Appointed to the Assembly on June 15, 1989)
1990–1991	John O. Bennett (R)	Clare Farragher (R)	Michael Arnone (R)
1992–1993	John O. Bennett (R)	Clare Farragher (R)	Michael Arnone (R)
1994–1995	John O. Bennett (R)	Clare Farragher (R)	Michael Arnone (R)
1996–1997	John O. Bennett (R)	Clare Farragher (R)	Michael Arnone (R)
1998–1999	John O. Bennett (R)	Clare Farragher (R)	Michael Arnone (R)
2000–2001	John O. Bennett (R)	Clare Farragher (R)	Michael Arnone (R)
2002–2003	John O. Bennett (R)	Clare Farragher (R)	Michael Arnone (R)
2004–2005	Ellen Karcher (D)	Robert Lewis Morgan (D)	Michael J. Panter (D)
2006–2007	Ellen Karcher (D)	Jennifer Beck (R)	Michael J. Panter (D)
2008–2009	Jennifer Beck (R)	Declan O'Scanlon (R)	Caroline Casagrande (R)
2010–2011	Jennifer Beck (R)	Declan O'Scanlon (R)	Caroline Casagrande (R)
2012–2013	Samuel D. Thompson (R)	Ronald S. Dancer (R)	Robert D. Clifton (R)
2014–2015	Samuel D. Thompson (R)	Ronald S. Dancer (R)	Robert D. Clifton (R)
2016–2017	Samuel D. Thompson (R)	Ronald S. Dancer (R)	Robert D. Clifton (R)
2018–2019	Samuel D. Thompson (R)	Ronald S. Dancer (R)	Robert D. Clifton (R)
2020–2021	Samuel D. Thompson (R)	Ronald S. Dancer (R)	Robert D. Clifton (R)
2022–2023	Samuel D. Thompson (R)	Ronald S. Dancer (R) (Note: Died July 23, 2022)	Robert D. Clifton (R)
2022–2023	Samuel D. Thompson (R)	Alex Sauickie (R) (Note: Appointed to the Assembly on September 15, 2022)	Robert D. Clifton (R)
2022–2023	Samuel D. Thompson (D) (Note: Switched from Republican to Democratic on February 13, 2023)	Alex Sauickie (R)	Robert D. Clifton (R)
2024–2025	Owen Henry (R)	Alex Sauickie (R)	Robert D. Clifton (R)
2026–2027	Owen Henry (R)	Alex Sauickie (R)	Robert D. Clifton (R)

== Election results, 1973–present ==
=== Senate ===
2021 New Jersey general election
Party	Candidate	Votes	%	±%
Republican	Samuel D. Thompson	46,897	64.9	▲8.2
Democratic	Joseph Altomonte	25,321	35.1	▼6.3
Total votes		72,218	100.0	

New Jersey general election, 2017
Party	Candidate	Votes	%	±%
Republican	Samuel D. Thompson	30,013	56.7	▼8.7
Democratic	David H. Lande	21,888	41.4	▲6.8
Coach Kev	Kevin Antoine	990	1.9	N/A
Total votes		52,891	100.0	

New Jersey general election, 2013
Party	Candidate	Votes	%	±%
Republican	Samuel D. Thompson	32,911	65.4	▲5.5
Democratic	Raymond D. Dotard	17,440	34.6	▼5.5
Total votes		50,351	100.0	

2011 New Jersey general election
Party	Candidate	Votes	%
Republican	Samuel D. Thompson	22,578	59.9
Democratic	Robert "Bob" Brown	15,125	40.1
Total votes		37,703	100.0

2007 New Jersey general election
Party	Candidate	Votes	%	±%
Republican	Jennifer Beck	26,743	53.9	▲11.4
Democratic	Ellen Karcher	22,844	46.1	▼6.3
Total votes		49,587	100.0	

2003 New Jersey general election
Party	Candidate	Votes	%	±%
Democratic	Ellen Karcher	24,174	52.4	▲11.2
Republican	John O. Bennett	19,600	42.5	▼16.3
Green	Earl Gray	2,334	5.1	N/A
Total votes		46,108	100.0	

2001 New Jersey general election
Party	Candidate	Votes	%
Republican	John O. Bennett	34,464	58.8
Democratic	Amy I. Aughenbaugh	24,189	41.2
Total votes		58,653	100.0

1997 New Jersey general election
Party	Candidate	Votes	%	±%
Republican	John O. Bennett, III	41,171	62.8	▼2.2
Democratic	George E. Ball	20,289	30.9	▼0.4
Conservative	John P. Desmond	2,780	4.2	▲1.8
Natural Law	Mary Jo Christian	1,354	2.1	N/A
Total votes		65,594	100.0	

1993 New Jersey general election
Party	Candidate	Votes	%	±%
Republican	John O. Bennett	43,490	65.0	▼2.2
Democratic	George E. Ball	20,926	31.3	▲3.5
Conservative	Rich Pezzullo	1,609	2.4	N/A
Libertarian	Virginia A. Flynn	881	1.3	▼0.4
Total votes		66,906	100.0	

1991 New Jersey general election
Party	Candidate	Votes	%
Republican	John O. Bennett	36,629	67.2
Democratic	Joseph D. Youssouf	15,151	27.8
Abortion Is Murder	Pat Daly	1,760	3.2
Libertarian	Helen L. Radder	941	1.7
Total votes		54,481	100.0

Special election, November 7, 1989
Party	Candidate	Votes	%	±%
Republican	John O. Bennett	36,196	56.7	▼10.9
Democratic	Andrew M. Smith, Jr.	27,661	43.3	▲10.9
Total votes		63,857	100.0	

1987 New Jersey general election
Party	Candidate	Votes	%	±%
Republican	S. Thomas Gagliano	31,188	67.6	▲16.7
Democratic	Bernard B. Finan	14,965	32.4	▼16.7
Total votes		46,153	100.0	

1983 New Jersey general election
Party	Candidate	Votes	%	±%
Republican	S. Thomas Gagliano	24,294	50.9	▼8.2
Democratic	Alexander D. Lehrer	23,414	49.1	▲8.2
Total votes		47,708	100.0	

1981 New Jersey general election
Party	Candidate	Votes	%
Republican	S. Thomas Gagliano	33,521	59.1
Democratic	Roger J. Kane	23,169	40.9
Total votes		56,690	100.0

1977 New Jersey general election
Party	Candidate	Votes	%	±%
Democratic	Eugene J. Bedell	28,391	53.6	▼5.2
Republican	Joseph Azzolina	21,877	41.3	▲6.1
Independent	Eileen Lloyd	2,435	4.6	N/A
Libertarian	Jack Moyers	261	0.5	N/A
Total votes		52,964	100.0	

1973 New Jersey general election
Party	Candidate	Votes	%
Democratic	Eugene J. Bedell	29,193	58.8
Republican	Joseph Azzolina	17,492	35.2
United Independents	Peter P. Garibaldi	2,967	6.0
Total votes		49,652	100.0

=== General Assembly ===
Special election, November 8, 2022
Party	Candidate	Votes	%
Republican	Alexander Sauckie III		
Democratic	Paul Sarti		
Total votes			100.0

2021 New Jersey general election
Party	Candidate	Votes	%	±%
Republican	Ronald S. Dancer	47,595	33.4	▲1.3
Republican	Robert D. Clifton	46,378	32.5	▲1.3
Democratic	Michael Palazzolla	24,642	17.3	▼1.5
Democratic	Raya Arbiol	23,993	16.8	▼1.1
Total votes		142,608	100.0	

2019 New Jersey general election
Party	Candidate	Votes	%	±%
Republican	Ronald S. Dancer	24,577	32.1	▲2.8
Republican	Robert D. Clifton	23,879	31.2	▲2.7
Democratic	David H. Lande	14,449	18.9	▼1.8
Democratic	Malini Guha	13,708	17.9	▼1.8
Total votes		76,613	100.0	

New Jersey general election, 2017
Party	Candidate	Votes	%	±%
Republican	Ronald S. Dancer	30,348	29.3	▼0.2
Republican	Robert D. Clifton	29,610	28.5	▲0.5
Democratic	Gene Davis	21,441	20.7	▲0.3
Democratic	Nirav Patel	20,397	19.7	▼0.6
Libertarian	Anthony J. Storrow	1,016	1.0	N/A
Libertarian	Daniel A. Krause	938	0.9	N/A
Total votes		103,750	100.0	

New Jersey general election, 2015
Party	Candidate	Votes	%	±%
Republican	Ronald S. Dancer	15,164	29.5	▼3.3
Republican	Robert D. Clifton	14,433	28.0	▼3.7
Democratic	David W. Merwin	10,496	20.4	▲2.9
Democratic	Robert P. Kurzydlowski	10,449	20.3	▲3.7
Green	Stephen N. Zielinski Sr.	945	1.8	N/A
Total votes		51,487	100.0	

New Jersey general election, 2013
Party	Candidate	Votes	%	±%
Republican	Ronald S. Dancer	32,188	32.8	▲2.5
Republican	Robert D. Clifton	31,059	31.7	▲2.6
Democratic	Lawrence J. Furman	17,119	17.5	▼2.9
Democratic	Nicholas Nellegar	16,312	16.6	▼3.7
For the People	Diane Bindler	1,354	1.4	N/A
Total votes		98,032	100.0	

New Jersey general election, 2011
Party	Candidate	Votes	%
Republican	Ronald S. Dancer	22,345	30.3
Republican	Robert D. Clifton	21,469	29.1
Democratic	William "Bill" Spedding	15,077	20.4
Democratic	Catherine Tinney Rome	14,969	20.3
Total votes		73,860	100.0

New Jersey general election, 2009
Party	Candidate	Votes	%	±%
Republican	Declan J. O’Scanlon, Jr.	42,932	31.3	▲5.7
Republican	Caroline Casagrande	42,662	31.1	▲5.6
Democratic	Michelle Roth	25,891	18.9	▼6.1
Democratic	John Amberg	24,125	17.6	▼6.3
Green	Steven Welzer	1,635	1.2	N/A
Total votes		137,245	100.0	

New Jersey general election, 2007
Party	Candidate	Votes	%	±%
Republican	Declan O'Scanlon Jr.	24,493	25.6	▲1.6
Republican	Caroline Casagrande	24,352	25.5	▲0.7
Democratic	Mike Panter	23,842	25.0	▲1.0
Democratic	Amy Mallet	22,870	23.9	▲0.1
Total votes		95,557	100.0	

New Jersey general election, 2005
Party	Candidate	Votes	%	±%
Republican	Jennifer Beck	31,418	24.8	▲0.8
Democratic	Michael J. Panter	30,466	24.01	▼2.8
Republican	Declan O'Scanlon Jr.	30,401	23.96	▲1.1
Democratic	Robert L. Morgan	30,228	23.82	▼2.6
Green	Ann Napolitano	2,306	1.8	N/A
Green	Judith Stanton	2,052	1.6	N/A
Total votes		126,871	100.0	

New Jersey general election, 2003
Party	Candidate	Votes	%	±%
Democratic	Michael Panter	23,613	26.8	▲3.8
Democratic	Robert Morgan	23,240	26.4	▲3.6
Republican	Michael J. Arnone	21,098	24.0	▼3.3
Republican	Clare M. Farragher	20,140	22.9	▼3.3
Total votes		88,091	100.0	

New Jersey general election, 2001
Party	Candidate	Votes	%
Republican	Michael J. Arnone	31,794	27.3
Republican	Clare M. Farragher	30,476	26.2
Democratic	Gordon N. Gemma	26,823	23.0
Democratic	William I. Scherer	26,501	22.8
Natural Law	Mary Jo Christian	865	0.7
Total votes		116,459	100.0

New Jersey general election, 1999
Party	Candidate	Votes	%	±%
Republican	Michael J. Arnone	19,236	28.4	▼2.3
Republican	Clare M. Farragher	18,564	27.4	▼2.7
Democratic	David M. Lerner	13,970	20.6	▲2.5
Democratic	Salvatore Vitale	12,991	19.2	▲1.9
Conservative	Frances H. Marshall	1,223	1.8	▲0.5
Conservative	Cornelius Van Sant	1,068	1.6	▲0.4
Natural Law	Mary Jo Christian	773	1.1	▲0.4
Total votes		67,825	100.0	

New Jersey general election, 1997
Party	Candidate	Votes	%	±%
Republican	Michael J. Arnone	39,098	30.7	▼2.6
Republican	Clare M. Farragher	38,356	30.1	▼3.2
Democratic	Lillian E. Harris	23,018	18.1	▼4.9
Democratic	Gayle L. Hershcopf	22,073	17.3	N/A
Conservative	Frances H. Marshall	1,645	1.3	▼2.7
Conservative	Cornelius Van Sant	1,528	1.2	▼3.0
Natural Law	Christina M. Zegler	913	0.7	▼0.5
Natural Law	Joseph Parziale	867	0.7	▼0.4
Total votes		127,498	100.0	

New Jersey general election, 1995
Party	Candidate	Votes	%	±%
Republican	Michael J. Arnone	20,301	33.3	▲1.5
Republican	Clare M. Farragher	20,275	33.3	▲1.8
Democratic	Lynn Reich	13,996	23.0	▲4.4
Conservative	Richard Pezzullo	2,539	4.2	N/A
Conservative	Frances H. Marshall	2,426	4.0	N/A
Natural Law	Ronnie Dougherty	733	1.2	N/A
Natural Law	Gordon Smith	676	1.1	N/A
Total votes		60,946	100.0	

New Jersey general election, 1993
Party	Candidate	Votes	%	±%
Republican	Michael J. Arnone	41,450	31.8	▼0.2
Republican	Clare M. Farragher	41,061	31.5	▼0.4
Democratic	Lillian Harris	24,281	18.6	▲2.3
Democratic	Fred Eckhaus	23,676	18.1	▲2.3
Total votes		130,468	100.0	

1991 New Jersey general election
Party	Candidate	Votes	%
Republican	Michael J. Arnone	33,772	32.0
Republican	Clare M. Farragher	33,657	31.9
Democratic	Michael A. Ferguson	17,168	16.3
Democratic	Arnold Bellush	16,625	15.8
Accountable Independent	James H. Dorn	1,867	1.8
Libertarian	Virginia A. Flynn	1,396	1.3
Libertarian	Donald W. Jamison	971	0.9
Total votes		105,456	100.0

1989 New Jersey general election
Party	Candidate	Votes	%	±%
Republican	Clare M. Farragher	34,169	26.3	▼3.5
Republican	Michael J. Arnone	33,506	25.8	▼5.9
Democratic	Lynn Reich	31,515	24.2	▲4.8
Democratic	Frank G. Abate	30,842	23.7	▲4.6
Total votes		130,032	100.0	

1987 New Jersey general election
Party	Candidate	Votes	%	±%
Republican	John O. Bennett	28,592	31.7	▼0.8
Republican	Clare M. Farragher	26,931	29.8	▼1.8
Democratic	Dante J. Massa	17,544	19.4	▲1.2
Democratic	Gene J. Anthony	17,217	19.1	▲1.4
Total votes		90,284	100.0	

Special election, February 3, 1987
Party	Candidate	Votes	%
Republican	Clare M. Farragher	6,321	54.0
Democratic	Lynn Reich	5,392	46.0
Total votes		11,713	100.0

1985 New Jersey general election
Party	Candidate	Votes	%	±%
Republican	John O. Bennett	33,205	32.5	▲2.6
Republican	Marie Sheehan Muhler	32,346	31.6	▲2.0
Democratic	Donald M. Lomurro	18,584	18.2	▼2.3
Democratic	Michael L. Detzky	18,129	17.7	▼2.3
Total votes		102,264	100.0	

New Jersey general election, 1983
Party	Candidate	Votes	%	±%
Republican	John O. Bennett	27,599	29.9	▼0.1
Republican	Marie Sheehan Muhler	27,288	29.6	▼1.4
Democratic	Sally Ann Mollica	18,892	20.5	▲0.8
Democratic	George P. Spodak	18,410	20.0	▲0.6
Total votes		92,189	100.0	

New Jersey general election, 1981
Party	Candidate	Votes	%
Republican	Marie Sheehan Muhler	34,411	31.0
Republican	John O. Bennett	33,263	30.0
Democratic	Joseph Meehan	21,840	19.7
Democratic	Stephen C. Hornik	21,540	19.4
Total votes		111,054	100.0

New Jersey general election, 1979
Party	Candidate	Votes	%	±%
Democratic	Richard Van Wagner	28,325	29.4	▼1.3
Democratic	William E. Flynn	26,751	27.7	▼0.7
Republican	Robert B. Thaler	20,597	21.4	▲0.6
Republican	Richard J. Dealy, Jr.	20,054	20.8	▲1.0
Libertarian	Chris Toto	740	0.8	▲0.4
Total votes		96,467	100.0	

New Jersey general election, 1977
Party	Candidate	Votes	%	±%
Democratic	Richard Van Wagner	31,681	30.7	▲2.1
Democratic	William E. Flynn	29,344	28.4	▲1.5
Republican	Michael J. Arnone	21,542	20.8	▼1.5
Republican	Richard A. Cooper	20,417	19.8	▼2.4
Libertarian	Stevenson M. Enterline	362	0.4	N/A
Total votes		103,346	100.0	

New Jersey general election, 1975
Party	Candidate	Votes	%	±%
Democratic	Richard Van Wagner	27,832	28.6	▼1.7
Democratic	William E. Flynn	26,225	26.9	▼3.7
Republican	Albert E. Allen	21,739	22.3	▲2.5
Republican	Peter J. Carton	21,630	22.2	▲2.8
Total votes		97,426	100.0	

New Jersey general election, 1973
Party	Candidate	Votes	%
Democratic	William E. Flynn	29,427	30.6
Democratic	Richard Van Wagner	29,203	30.3
Republican	Michael J. Arnone	19,030	19.8
Republican	Richard A. Cooper	18,642	19.4
Total votes		96,302	100.0

== Election results, 1965–1973 ==
=== Senate ===
1965 New Jersey general election
Party	Candidate	Votes	%
Democratic	William V. Musto	154,183	24.7
Democratic	William F. Kelly, Jr.	152,975	24.6
Democratic	Frank J. Guarini	152,263	24.4
Republican	William Bozzuffi	52,363	8.4
Republican	John J. Grossi, Jr.	51,891	8.3
Republican	Victoria Borsett	50,649	8.1
The New Frontier	James C. Lynch	3,204	0.5
The New Frontier	Beatrice Waiss	2,772	0.4
The New Frontier	Willie Mae Mason	2,741	0.4
Total votes		623,041	100.0

1967 New Jersey general election
Party	Candidate	Votes	%
Democratic	William V. Musto	115,534	16.6
Democratic	Frank J. Guarini, Jr.	111,741	16.0
Democratic	William F. Kelly, Jr.	111,331	16.0
Democratic	Frederick H. Hauser	110,949	15.9
Republican	Cresenzi Castaldo	39,667	5.7
Republican	Eugene P. Kenny	39,049	5.6
Republican	Norman H. Roth	38,985	5.6
Republican	Geoffrey Gaulkin	37,609	5.4
No Additional Taxes	Michael J. Bell	24,777	3.6
No Additional Taxes	James B. Sansone	19,713	2.8
No Additional Taxes	Allen Zavodnick	19,106	2.7
No Additional Taxes	George Ahto	19,046	2.7
Conservative	Frank Potocnie	2,467	0.4
Conservative	Rita A. Bailey	2,428	0.3
Conservative	Gabriel M. Masters	2,262	0.3
Conservative	George A. Daum	2,239	0.3
Total votes		696,903	100.0

1971 New Jersey general election
Party	Candidate	Votes	%
Democratic	William V. Musto	81,522	17.0
Democratic	James P. Dugan	78,293	16.3
Democratic	William F. Kelly, Jr.	76,177	15.9
Save Hudson County	Patrick D. Conaghan	47,082	9.8
Save Hudson County	Francis X. Hayes	47,036	9.8
Save Hudson County	Anthony M. Defino	44,703	9.3
Republican	Joseph J. Panepinto	33,985	7.1
Republican	Cosmo Palmitessa	33,131	6.9
Republican	Mario DeLuca	32,131	6.7
Honesty-Efficiency-Decency	Richard D. McAleer	5,496	1.1
Total votes		479,556	100.0

=== General Assembly ===
==== District 12A ====
New Jersey general election, 1967
Party	Candidate	Votes	%
Democratic	John J. Fekety	26,990	31.9
Democratic	Addison M. McLeon	26,384	31.2
Republican	John C. Gallagher	10,143	12.0
Republican	Oliver Timbers	8,640	10.2
No Additional Taxes	Frank Gorman	5,867	6.9
No Additional Taxes	Al Rinn	5,378	6.4
Conservative	Thomas McFadden	648	0.8
Conservative	Melvin A. Henderson	622	0.7
Total votes		84,672	100.0

New Jersey general election, 1969
Party	Candidate	Votes	%
Democratic	Joseph A. Lefante	38,635	32.9
Democratic	James P. Dugan	37,283	31.8
Republican	Walter Skowronski	20,882	17.8
Republican	Albert A. Sann	19,363	16.5
National Conservative	Arthur F. Distler	599	0.5
National Conservative	Robert W. Ragsdale	539	0.5
Total votes		117,301	100.0

New Jersey general election, 1971
Party	Candidate	Votes	%
Democratic	Joseph A. LeFante	29,702	26.6
Democratic	David A. Wallace	26,585	23.8
Save Hudson County	Leonard R. Kantor	14,517	13.0
Save Hudson County	Richard E. Morrow	14,305	12.8
Republican	John W. Pettigrew	13,575	12.2
Republican	Helen Payzak	12,810	11.5
Total votes		111,494	100.0

==== District 12B ====
New Jersey general election, 1967
Party	Candidate	Votes	%
Democratic	Alfred E. Suminski	28,693	31.3
Democratic	David Friedland	28,151	30.7
No Additional Taxes	Vincent Verdiramo	8,182	8.9
No Additional Taxes	Mortimer P. Cullity	7,856	8.6
Republican	Andrew H. Stoma	7,708	8.4
Republican	Ronald T. Hazzard	7,632	8.3
A Fair Share	Arsenio V. Silvestri	1,028	1.1
A Fair Share	James J. Mack	914	1.0
Conservative	Dolores S. Connerty	699	0.8
Conservative	Alfred E. Smith	690	0.8
Total votes		91,553	100.0

New Jersey general election, 1969
Party	Candidate	Votes	%
Democratic	Alfred E. Suminski	25,854	29.7
Democratic	David Friedland	25,151	28.9
Republican	John P. Errico	17,625	20.3
Republican	William X. Burke	17,044	19.6
National Conservative	William A. Otto	657	0.8
National Conservative	Carol Ann Borowski	629	0.7
Total votes		86,960	100.0

New Jersey general election, 1971
Party	Candidate	Votes	%
Democratic	Michael P. Esposito	24,124	25.5
Democratic	William G. Wilkerson	22,870	24.2
Save Hudson County	Anthony L. Altomonte	12,747	13.5
Save Hudson County	William O. Perkins, Jr.	11,325	12.0
Republican	John P. Errico	10,893	11.5
Republican	John Alexander	10,669	11.3
Independent	George Whaley	1,937	2.0
Total votes		94,565	100.0

==== District 12C ====
New Jersey general election, 1967
Party	Candidate	Votes	%
Democratic	Michael P. Esposito	22,916	33.2
Democratic	Christopher J. Jackman	22,533	32.7
Republican	Anthony Federico	7,907	11.5
Republican	Walter J. Hyjek	7,596	11.0
No Additional Taxes	Edward Lombardi	3,807	5.5
No Additional Taxes	Katherine Bell	3,339	4.8
Conservative	Joseph M. Caruso	467	0.7
Conservative	Carol A. Otto	411	0.6
Total votes		68,976	100.0

New Jersey general election, 1969
Party	Candidate	Votes	%
Democratic	Frank R. Conwell	20,884	32.8
Democratic	Michael P. Esposito	20,689	32.5
Republican	Anthony L. Federico	11,093	17.4
Republican	Albert R. Jordan	10,973	17.2
Total votes		63,639	100.0

New Jersey general election, 1971
Party	Candidate	Votes	%
Democratic	Christopher J. Jackman	22,162	21.5
Democratic	Silvio J. Failla	21,637	21.0
Save Hudson County	John J. Duffy	20,091	19.5
Save Hudson County	James E. Lagomarsino	19,968	19.4
Republican	Charles E. Miller	10,201	9.9
Republican	Josephine Astrauskas	9,048	8.8
Total votes		103,107	100.0

Special election, January 8, 1973
Party	Candidate	Votes	%
Democratic	Thomas A. Gallo	11,208	62.7
Republican	Nilo Juri	4,124	23.1
Independent	Eleanor Yaschak	1,233	6.9
Independent	Angelo Charles Romano	622	3.5
Independent	Herbert Shaw	293	1.6
Total votes		17,880	100.0

==== District 12D ====
New Jersey general election, 1967
Party	Candidate	Votes	%
Democratic	Norman A. Doyle, Jr.	30,833	31.1
Democratic	Theodore Digiammo	30,759	31.0
Republican	Robert W. McCann	14,736	14.8
Republican	Cosmo Palmitessa	14,524	14.6
No Additional Taxes	H. Roger Gilbert	3,656	3.7
No Additional Taxes	Rocco Biase	3,293	3.3
Conservative	Joseph F. Jorda	795	0.8
Conservative	Ernest T. Bradow	678	0.7
Total votes		99,274	100.0

New Jersey general election, 1969
Party	Candidate	Votes	%
Democratic	Joseph M. Healey	26,380	25.8
Democratic	Christopher J. Jackman	25,967	25.4
Republican	Cosmo A. Palmitessa	23,956	23.5
Republican	Marita Borzaga	23,471	23.0
National Conservative	Ralph D. Cicirelli	1,408	1.4
National Conservative	George S. Whateley	873	0.9
Total votes		102,055	100.0

==== District 12 At-large ====
New Jersey general election, 1971
Party	Candidate	Votes	%
Democratic	David Friedland	69,970	46.7
Save Hudson County	Meyer Kaplan	46,425	31.0
Republican	Rae S. Zalkin	33,428	22.3
Total votes		149,823	100.0
