= Declan O'Scanlon =

Member of the New Jersey Senate

Member of the New Jersey Senate from the 13th district
- Incumbent
- Assumed office January 9, 2018
- Preceded by: Joe Kyrillos

Member of the New Jersey General Assembly
- In office January 8, 2008 – January 9, 2018
- Preceded by: Jennifer Beck; Michael J. Panter
- Succeeded by: Serena DiMaso
- Constituency: 12th district (2008–2012); 13th district (2012–2018)

Personal details
- Born: Declan Joseph O'Scanlon Jr. June 9, 1963 (age 63) Marlboro Township, New Jersey, U.S.
- Party: Republican
- Spouse: Heather
- Education: Monmouth University (BA, BS)
- Website: State Senate website

Declan Joseph O'Scanlon Jr. (born June 9, 1963) is an American politician who has served in the New Jersey Senate since 2018, representing the 13th Legislative District. A member of the Republican Party, he previously served in the New Jersey General Assembly from 2012 to 2018. Prior to the 2011 redistricting, O'Scanlon represented the 12th Legislative District in the Assembly from 2008 to 2012.

== Early life ==
O'Scanlon was born in Marlboro Township and resides in Little Silver. He served on the Little Silver Borough Council from 1994 to 2007 and also served as the borough's police commissioner. O'Scanlon graduated with dual bachelor's degrees from Monmouth University (a BA and a BS), majoring in Psychology and Finance. He is the chief executive officer of FSD Enterprises LLC of Red Bank. The company is a wireless telecommunications consulting and public relations firm he founded in 1995. FSD specializes in helping bring together elected officials and wireless industry representatives to promote mutually agreeable solutions to wireless infrastructure siting. FSD's areas of expertise include municipal wireless ordinance construction, current wireless technology and future trends and municipal bidding for wireless infrastructure locations.

== New Jersey Assembly ==
Running together with Jennifer Beck, O'Scanlon lost the very close Assembly election held on November 8, 2005. As of December 6, 2005, Beck was declared winner of one of the seats, and was the top vote getter in the District with 31,421 votes. Freshman Democratic Assemblyman Michael J. Panter won re-election with 30,473 votes, narrowly edging O'Scanlon, who had 30,400 votes, just 73 fewer than Panter. One-term incumbent Robert Lewis Morgan lost his bid for re-election, coming in fourth with 30,257 votes. In a partial rematch of 2005, O'Scanlon and his Republican running mate Caroline Casagrande defeated incumbent Panter and future Monmouth County Freeholder Amy Mallet in the 2007 General Assembly election. O'Scanlon and Casagrande received 25.6% and 25.5% of the vote respectively while Panter and Mallet got 25.0% and 23.9% respectively. He was opposed to the state's red light camera program and has proposed legislation to increase fines for those caught misusing passing lanes, increasing the state's speed limit, and removing the state ban on self-service gas stations.

== New Jersey Senate ==
After incumbent District 13 Senator Joe Kyrillos announced he would not seek re-election for 2017, O'Scanlon was nominated by the Republicans to succeed him in the general election. O'Scanlon was initially to face fellow Assembly member Amy Handlin for Kyrillos' seat in the Republican primary, but Handlin ultimately dropped her bid. He subsequently won the seat in the 2017 election, defeating Democratic candidate Sean Byrnes by a 34,782 to 28,353 margin, and began serving in the Senate in 2018. O'Scanlon was succeeded in the Assembly by Republican Serena DiMaso.

During the 2019 budget fight, Democrats contradicted Governor Phil Murphy and passed a budget with no millionaires tax. O'Scanlon, alongside six other Republicans, voted for the budget.

=== Committees ===
Committee assignments for the 2024—2025 Legislative Session are:

- Budget and Appropriations
- Law and Public Safety

=== District 13 ===
Each of the 40 districts in the New Jersey Legislature has one representative in the New Jersey Senate and two members in the New Jersey General Assembly. The representatives from the 13th District for the 2024—2025 Legislative Session are:

- Senator Declan O'Scanlon (R)
- Assemblyman Vicky Flynn (R)
- Assemblyman Gerard Scharfenberger (R)

== Electoral history ==
=== Senate ===
13th Legislative District General Election, 2023
Party	Candidate	Votes	%
Republican	Declan O'Scanlon (incumbent)	31,750	58.8
Democratic	Lucille Lo Sapio	22,236	41.2
Total votes		53,986	100.0
Republican hold			

13th Legislative District general election, 2021
Party	Candidate	Votes	%
Republican	Declan O'Scanlon (incumbent)	53,599	61.45
Democratic	Vincent Solomeno III	33,627	38.55
Total votes		87,226	100.0
Republican hold			

New Jersey general election, 2017
Party	Candidate	Votes	%	±%
Republican	Declan O'Scanlon	34,976	55.1	▼13.0
Democratic	Sean F. Byrnes	28,493	44.9	▲14.3
Total votes		'63,469'	'100.0'	

=== Assembly District 13 ===
New Jersey general election, 2015
Party	Candidate	Votes	%	±%
Republican	Amy Handlin	19,829	30.4	▼3.1
Republican	Declan O'Scanlon	18,977	29.1	▼3.4
Democratic	Thomas Herman	12,934	19.8	▲2.8
Democratic	Jeanne Cullinane	12,779	19.6	▲3.3
Jobs, Sidewalks, Transit	Joshua Leinsdorf	770	1.2	N/A
Total votes		'65,289'	'100.0'	

New Jersey general election, 2013
Party	Candidate	Votes	%	±%
Republican	Amy Handlin	38,795	33.5	▲3.0
Republican	Declan O'Scanlon	37,577	32.5	▲3.7
Democratic	Allison Friedman	19,623	17.0	▼2.4
Democratic	Matthew Morehead	18,843	16.3	▼2.9
Vote Green 13	Anne Zaletel	796	0.7	N/A
Total votes		'115,634'	'100.0'	

New Jersey general election, 2011
Party	Candidate	Votes	%
Republican	Amy Handlin	24,073	30.5
Republican	Declan O'Scanlon	22,754	28.8
Democratic	Patrick Short	15,333	19.4
Democratic	Kevin M. Lavan	15,165	19.2
Constitution	Frank C. Cottone	834	1.1
Constitution	William H. Lawton	757	1.0
Total votes		78,916	100.0

=== Assembly District 12 ===
New Jersey general election, 2009
Party	Candidate	Votes	%	±%
Republican	Declan J. O’Scanlon, Jr.	42,932	31.3	▲5.7
Republican	Caroline Casagrande	42,662	31.1	▲5.6
Democratic	Michelle Roth	25,891	18.9	▼6.1
Democratic	John Amberg	24,125	17.6	▼6.3
Green	Steven Welzer	1,635	1.2	N/A
Total votes		'137,245'	'100.0'	

New Jersey general election, 2007
Party	Candidate	Votes	%	±%
Republican	Declan O'Scanlon Jr.	24,493	25.6	▲1.6
Republican	Caroline Casagrande	24,352	25.5	▲0.7
Democratic	Mike Panter	23,842	25.0	▲1.0
Democratic	Amy Mallet	22,870	23.9	▲0.1
Total votes		'95,557'	'100.0'	

New Jersey general election, 2005
Party	Candidate	Votes	%	±%
Republican	Jennifer Beck	31,418	24.8	▲0.8
Democratic	Michael J. Panter	30,466	24.01	▼2.8
Republican	Declan O'Scanlon Jr.	30,401	23.96	▲1.1
Democratic	Robert L. Morgan	30,228	23.82	▼2.6
Green	Ann Napolitano	2,306	1.8	N/A
Green	Judith Stanton	2,052	1.6	N/A
Total votes		'126,871'	'100.0'	
