= Michael J. Panter =

American politician

Member of the New Jersey General Assembly from the 12th district
- In office January 13, 2004 – January 8, 2008
- Succeeded by: Declan O'Scanlon; Caroline Casagrande

Personal details
- Born: October 10, 1969 (age 56)
- Education: Syracuse University (B.A.); Harvard Law School (J.D.)

Michael J. Panter (born October 10, 1969 in Red Bank, New Jersey) is an American politician and entrepreneur from the state of New Jersey. Panter served in the New Jersey General Assembly for two terms from 2004 until 2008, where he represented the 12th legislative district. He has been as resident of Shrewsbury, New Jersey.

== Education ==
Panter received a B.A. from Syracuse University in History and was awarded a J.D. from Harvard Law School in 1995.

== Business career ==
He is listed as the managing partner of Panter & Kelly Financial LLC, a firm engaged in the management of corporate pension plans, and as the founder/managing member of Realty Data Systems, a real estate technology and data collection company serving as a government vendor in New Jersey, which has conducted inspections of over 300,000 properties for municipal governments.

Previously, an investment banker with Salomon Smith Barney in New York City handling mergers and acquisitions, he also spent several years practicing as a corporate attorney in New Jersey and New York .

== Career in state politics ==
Panter and running mate Robert Lewis Morgan were elected in 2003, ousting incumbent Republicans Michael Arnone and Clare Farragher.

Panter served in the Assembly on the Financial Institutions and Insurance Committee (as Vice Chair), the Environment and Solid Waste Committee and the Transportation and Public Works Committee.

In the 2005 election for the 12th district (covering portions of Monmouth and Mercer counties), Panter narrowly defeated Republican challenger Declan O'Scanlon, winning the district's second seat by 73 votes.

Panter's 2003 primary and general election victories, and his 2005 re-election, made him the only Democrat to be elected, and re-elected in any legislative district within (predominantly Republican) Monmouth County in several decades.

In 2004, Panter appeared on Fox News Channel's Hannity & Colmes program to debate Ann Coulter regarding comments Coulter made about 9/11 widows from New Jersey who lived in Panter's legislative district.

In 2006 Panter moved to limit demonstrations at military funerals to a minimum of 500 feet from mourners following statements by the Westboro Baptist Church which announced plans to protest at New Jersey funerals for soldiers killed in Iraq, receiving the endorsement of the Asbury Park Press.

In 2006, Panter proposed a bill to prohibit the force-feeding of ducks and geese in New Jersey. This practice, done to fatten the birds' livers to make foie gras, was criticized by animal welfare and animal rights activists. His effort led to a spat with Anthony Bourdain who wrote an editorial published in The Star Ledger in opposition to Panter's proposed ban.

In 2007, Panter introduced legislation to exempt military members stationed overseas from paying state income taxes due to their official New Jersey residency.

Panter was also the sponsor of New Jersey's 2005 minimum wage increase and the Highlands Water Protection and Planning Act which limited development in an 800,000 acre zone in northwest New Jersey surrounding drinking water reservoirs for one half of the State's residents.

In the 2007 elections Democrats Panter and Amy Mallet were defeated on November 6 in a tight race against Republicans O'Scanlon and attorney Caroline Casagrande.

== Dispute with Bill O’Reilly ==
In October 2017, Panter wrote a social media post providing an account of the sexual harassment he claimed his former partner, a Fox News personality, faced from political commentator Bill O'Reilly.

Stating that he was motivated by hearing O’Reilly make public statements that "he's been persecuted", Panter stated that "Bill should be aware that not everyone is bound by a non-disclosure ... I am not." He described a phone call he witnessed in which he claimed O’Reilly sought damaging information from his former partner on another accuser, saying "He asked if anything was known about her sex life. He asked if she used any illegal drugs. He also asked if anything was known about her financial situation and marriage."

Reacting to O’Reilly's statement that "never once was there a complaint filed against me with any HR", Panter told CNN that "When I read that, I pictured Vladimir Putin defending his presidency by saying there have been no complaints to the KGB about him."

Panter's account reached a wider audience following Twitter posts from Vanity Fair journalist Gabriel Sherman on October 27, 2017, and he received support from former Fox News personalities Gretchen Carlson (December 4, 2017) and Kirsten Powers (October 26, 2017). Powers wrote that "any woman who worked at Fox News knows this is true" with Carlson thanking him for his "strength as a man helping fight sexual harassment."

== O’Reilly litigation ==
O’Reilly filed a $5 million defamation lawsuit against Panter in New York on October 26, 2017, calling his account a lie and labeling him a "smear merchant", and repeating his position on The Glenn Beck radio show.

Panter, a Harvard Law grad, proceeded to hire civil rights attorney Lisa Bloom, telling HuffPost that O’Reilly should be "a little smarter than that if they read a little bit about my background. You don’t need to be a lawyer to know that the absolute defense of defamation is that you’re speaking the truth" and suggesting O’Reilly could face his own defamation suit, adding to CNN that "His actions give me a small sense of what victims must feel when speaking up against powerful men, and why more men hesitate to do so."

Regarding the pending lawsuit, Vanity Fair noted "there are a great many journalists and others who would welcome the opportunity to see what a good libel defense lawyer could uncover about O’Reilly's behavior in the course of discovery. It seems unlikely that O’Reilly will open himself up to having to answer these types of questions under oath" and saying Panter's account "sure matches what we know of O’Reilly's workplace modus operandi"

In November 2018 Newsday reported that a federal judge had dismissed O'Reilly's suit, with Panter stating that the pundit "learned today that no amount of wealth or fame can silence the truth when people with shared principles band together."
