= New Jersey's 11th legislative district =

American legislative district

- Senator: Vin Gopal (D)
- Assembly members: Margie Donlon (D); Luanne Peterpaul (D)
- Registration: 33.81% Democratic; 27.40% Republican; 37.67% unaffiliated
- Demographics: 61.4% White; 13.0% Black/African American; 0.7% Native American; 4.3% Asian; 0.0% Hawaiian/Pacific Islander; 10.8% Other race; 9.8% Two or more races; 18.9% Hispanic
- Population: 251,063
- Voting-age population: 182,117
- Registered voters: 160,507

New Jersey's 11th legislative district is one of 40 in the New Jersey Legislature, covering the Monmouth County municipalities of Allenhurst Borough, Asbury Park City, Bradley Beach, Colts Neck Township, Deal Borough, Eatontown Borough, Fair Haven, Freehold Borough, Freehold Township, Interlaken Borough, Loch Arbour Village, Long Branch City, Neptune City Borough, Neptune Township, Ocean Township, Red Bank Borough, Shrewsbury Borough, Shrewsbury Township, and Tinton Falls Borough.

== Demographic characteristics ==
As of the 2020 United States census, the district had a population of 227,063, of whom 182,117 (80.2%) were of voting age. The racial makeup of the district was 139,463 (61.4%) White, 29,418 (13.0%) African American, 1,574 (0.7%) Native American, 9,695 (4.3%) Asian, 71 (0.0%) Pacific Islander, 24,487 (10.8%) from some other race, and 22,355 (9.8%) from two or more races. Hispanic or Latino of any race were 42,924 (18.9%) of the population.

The district had 167,889 registered voters as of February 1, 2025, of whom 66,176 (39.4%) were registered as unaffiliated, 55,518 (33.1%) were registered as Democrats, 44,213 (26.3%) were registered as Republicans, and 1,982 (1.2%) were registered to other parties.

== Political representation ==
For the 2026–2027 session, the 11th legislative district of the New Jersey Legislature is represented in the New Jersey Senate by Vin Gopal (D, Long Branch) and in the General Assembly by Margie Donlon (D, Ocean Township) and Luanne Peterpaul (D, Long Branch).

The legislative district overlaps with New Jersey's 3rd, New Jersey's 4th, and 6th congressional districts.

== 1965–1973 ==
In the interim period between the 1964 Supreme Court decision Reynolds v. Sims which required the creation of state legislature districts to be made as equal in population as possible, and the 1973 creation of the 40-district map, the 11th district consisted of all of Essex County. Because of its large population, the 11th Senate district elected multiple people to the State Senate at-large. It was further divided into six Assembly districts in 1967 and 1969, and five in 1971; in all cases, each district elected two people to serve in the General Assembly.

The members elected to the Senate from this district are as follows:

Session	Senators elected						
1966–1967	4	Nicholas Fernicola (D)	Maclyn Goldman (D)	John J. Giblin (D)	Hutchins F. Inge (D)		
1968–1969	6	Michael Giuliano (R)	Gerardo Del Tufo (R)	Alexander Matturri (R)	James Wallwork (R)	Milton Waldor (R)	David W. Dowd (R) (Note: Resigned on November 16, 1970, to become counsel for the New Jersey Turnpike Authority)
1970–1971	6	Michael Giuliano (R)	Gerardo Del Tufo (R)	Alexander Matturri (R)	James Wallwork (R)	Milton Waldor (R)	David W. Dowd (R)
1970–1971	6	Michael Giuliano (R)	Gerardo Del Tufo (R)	Alexander Matturri (R)	James Wallwork (R)	Milton Waldor (R)	Charles DeMarco (D) (Note: Elected in November 1971 special election to complete term of David W. Dowd)
1972–1973	5	Michael Giuliano (R)	Ralph DeRose (D)	James Wallwork (R)	Frank J. Dodd (D)	Wynona Lipman (D)	

The members elected to the General Assembly from the 11th Senate district are as follows:

Session	District 11A	District 11B	District 11C	District 11D	District 11E	District 11F
1968–1969	George C. Richardson (D)	Paul Policastro (D)	Ralph R. Caputo (R)	Kenneth T. Wilson (R)	Herbert Rinaldi (R)	Philip D. Kaltenbacher (R)
1968–1969	Walter J. Vohdin (D)	Ronald Owens (D)	C. Richard Fiore (R)	Frank J. Dodd (D)	John N. Dennis (R)	Thomas Kean (R)
1970–1971	Paul Policastro (D)	George C. Richardson (D)	Ralph R. Caputo (R) (Note: Resigned on October 4, 1971)	Herbert Rinaldi (R)	Kenneth T. Wilson (R)	Thomas Kean (R)
1970–1971	James Lordi (D)	Ronald Owens (D)	C. Richard Fiore (R)	David Goldfarb (R)	John N. Dennis (R)	Philip D. Kaltenbacher (R)
1972–1973	George C. Richardson (D)	Anthony Imperiale (I)	Carl Orechio (R)	Eldridge Hawkins (R)	Thomas Kean (R)	District eliminated
1972–1973	Ronald Owens (D)	Frank Megaro (D)	John N. Dennis (R)	Peter G. Stewart (D)	Philip D. Kaltenbacher (R)	District eliminated

== District composition since 1973 ==
When the 40-district state legislature apportionment was created in 1973, the 11th district consisted of central Monmouth County suburban townships including Freehold (and the borough of the same name), Howell, Colts Neck, Manalapan, Marlboro, Holmdel, and Hazlet with a spur from Tinton Falls (then called New Shrewsbury) to Sea Bright, and continuing up the Atlantic coastline to Highlands and Atlantic Highlands. In the 1981 redistricting, the district hugged the Monmouth County municipalities along the coastline from Manasquan to Atlantic Highlands inclusive of other inland townships and boroughs including Wall Township, Neptune Township, Ocean Township, and Oceanport. The 1990s iteration of the district remained largely the same with the exception of coastline municipalities south of South Belmar shifting to the 10th and the addition of Eatontown, Fair Haven, Rumson, and West Long Branch. Following the 2001 redistricting, most of the boroughs shifted to the 10th in the 1991 redistricting returned to the 11th (with the exception of Manasquan) while Fair Haven and Oceanport were shifted to the 12th.

Described by NJ.com as "perhaps the biggest upset of the night", Republican Jennifer Beck lost her bid for re-election to the Senate in 2017 to Democratic challenger Vin Gopal, in what was the third-most expensive of the 120 legislative races statewide, with total spending in excess of $4 million. The district had been represented only by Republicans since 1992. With the addition of heavily Democratic communities like Asbury Park in the 2011 apportionment, Democrats gained a 32%-23% margin over Republicans in numbers of registered voters. Democrats Joann Downey and Eric Houghtaling won the two Assembly seats in 2015 and Gopal's 2017 win over Beck, combined with holds by Assembly incumbents Downey and Houghtaling, put all three 11th district seats in the hands of Democrats.

== Election history ==
Session	Senate	General Assembly	
1974–1975	Alfred N. Beadleston (R)	Morton Salkind (D)	Walter J. Kozloski (D)
1976–1977	Alfred N. Beadleston (R)	Marie Sheehan Muhler (R)	Walter J. Kozloski (D)
1978–1979	S. Thomas Gagliano (R)	Marie Sheehan Muhler (R)	Walter J. Kozloski (D) (Note: Died November 25, 1979)
1980–1981	S. Thomas Gagliano (R)	Marie Sheehan Muhler (R)	John O. Bennett (R)
1982–1983	Brian T. Kennedy (R)	Joseph A. Palaia (R)	Anthony M. Villane (R)
1984–1985	Frank Pallone (D)	Joseph A. Palaia (R)	Anthony M. Villane (R)
1986–1987	Frank Pallone (D)	Joseph A. Palaia (R)	Anthony M. Villane (R)
1988–1989	Frank Pallone (D) (Note: Resigned on November 8, 1988, after his election to Congress)	Joseph A. Palaia (R) (Note: Elected to the Senate in November 1989 special election, sworn into the Senate on November 20, 1989)	Anthony M. Villane (R) (Note: Resigned on July 11, 1988, to join Department of Community Affairs)
1988–1989	Frank Pallone (D)	Joseph A. Palaia (R)	John Villapiano (D) (Note: Elected in September 15, 1988 special election, sworn in September 28, 1988)
1988–1989	John D'Amico Jr. (D) (Note: Appointed to the Senate on December 20, 1988, defeated in November 1989 special election)	Joseph A. Palaia (R)	John Villapiano (D)
1988–1989	Joseph A. Palaia (R)	Paul A. Kapalko (R) (Note: Appointed on November 27, 1989 to fill unexpired term of Palaia)	John Villapiano (D)
1990–1991	Joseph A. Palaia (R)	Daniel P. Jacobson (D)	John Villapiano (D)
1992–1993	Joseph A. Palaia (R)	Thomas S. Smith (R)	Steve Corodemus (R)
1994–1995	Joseph A. Palaia (R)	Thomas S. Smith (R)	Steve Corodemus (R)
1996–1997	Joseph A. Palaia (R)	Thomas S. Smith (R)	Steve Corodemus (R)
1998–1999	Joseph A. Palaia (R)	Thomas S. Smith (R)	Steve Corodemus (R)
2000–2001	Joseph A. Palaia (R)	Thomas S. Smith (R)	Steve Corodemus (R)
2002–2003	Joseph A. Palaia (R)	Thomas S. Smith (R) (Note: Died September 26, 2002)	Steve Corodemus (R)
2002–2003	Joseph A. Palaia (R)	Sean T. Kean (R) (Note: Appointed to the Assembly on October 28, 2002)	Steve Corodemus (R)
2004–2005	Joseph A. Palaia (R)	Sean T. Kean (R)	Steve Corodemus (R)
2006–2007	Joseph A. Palaia (R)	Sean T. Kean (R)	Steve Corodemus (R)
2008–2009	Sean T. Kean (R)	Dave Rible (R)	Mary Pat Angelini (R)
2010–2011	Sean T. Kean (R)	Dave Rible (R)	Mary Pat Angelini (R)
2012–2013	Jennifer Beck (R)	Caroline Casagrande (R)	Mary Pat Angelini (R)
2014–2015	Jennifer Beck (R)	Caroline Casagrande (R)	Mary Pat Angelini (R)
2016–2017	Jennifer Beck (R)	Joann Downey (D)	Eric Houghtaling (D)
2018–2019	Vin Gopal (D)	Joann Downey (D)	Eric Houghtaling (D)
2020–2021	Vin Gopal (D)	Joann Downey (D)	Eric Houghtaling (D)
2022–2023	Vin Gopal (D)	Marilyn Piperno (R)	Kimberly Eulner (R)
2024–2025	Vin Gopal (D)	Margie Donlon (D)	Luanne Peterpaul (D)
2026–2027	Vin Gopal (D)	Margie Donlon (D)	Luanne Peterpaul (D)

== Election results, 1973–present ==
=== Senate ===
2021 New Jersey general election
Party	Candidate	Votes	%	±%
Democratic	Vin Gopal	36,978	51.9	▼1.7
Republican	Lori L. Annetta	34,296	48.1	▲1.7
Total votes		71,274	100.0	

New Jersey general election, 2017
Party	Candidate	Votes	%	±%
Democratic	Vin Gopal	31,308	53.6	▲14.8
Republican	Jennifer Beck	27,150	46.4	▼13.6
Total votes		58,458	100.0	

New Jersey general election, 2013
Party	Candidate	Votes	%	±%
Republican	Jennifer Beck	30,531	60.0	▲3.4
Democratic	Michael Brantley	19,735	38.8	▼4.6
For the People	Marie E. Amato-Juckiewicz	599	1.2	N/A
Total votes		50,865	100.0	

2011 New Jersey general election
Party	Candidate	Votes	%
Republican	Jennifer Beck	20,226	56.6
Democratic	Raymond Santiago	15,487	43.4
Total votes		35,713	100.0

2007 New Jersey general election
Party	Candidate	Votes	%	±%
Republican	Sean T. Kean	28,403	63.3	▲4.6
Democratic	John A. Villapiano	16,465	36.7	▲9.3
Total votes		44,868	100.0	

2003 New Jersey general election
Party	Candidate	Votes	%	±%
Republican	Joseph A. Palaia	23,643	58.7	▼3.3
Democratic	Paul X. Escandon	11,045	27.4	▼10.6
Green	Brian Unger	4,759	11.8	N/A
Libertarian	Emerson Ellett	831	2.1	N/A
Total votes		40,278	100.0	

2001 New Jersey general election
Party	Candidate	Votes	%
Republican	Joseph A. Palaia	36,385	62.0
Democratic	Maureen O'Rourke	22,261	38.0
Total votes		58,646	100.0

1997 New Jersey general election
Party	Candidate	Votes	%	±%
Republican	Joseph A. Palaia	39,579	66.2	▲0.6
Democratic	Eugene M. LaVergne	18,981	31.7	▲0.8
Conservative	Christian P. Olsen	1,228	2.1	0.0
Total votes		59,788	100.0	

1993 New Jersey general election
Party	Candidate	Votes	%	±%
Republican	Joseph A. Palaia	40,612	65.6	▲0.4
Democratic	Richard C. Schwartz	19,163	30.9	▲0.8
Conservative	Tom Appleby	1,313	2.1	▼1.1
Libertarian	Barbara A. Jones	858	1.4	N/A
Total votes		61,946	100.0	

1991 New Jersey general election
Party	Candidate	Votes	%
Republican	Joseph A. Palaia	35,349	65.2
Democratic	Gloria R. Filippone	16,286	30.1
Non Lawyer	Thomas W. Appleby, Jr.	1,738	3.2
Nonpartisan	Joshua Leinsdorf	819	1.5
Total votes		54,192	100.0

Special election, November 7, 1989
Party	Candidate	Votes	%	±%
Republican	Joseph A. Palaia	30,878	51.3	▲11.4
Democratic	John D’Amico	28,722	47.7	▼12.4
Honest Politician	Joshua Leinsdorf	551	0.9	N/A
Total votes		60,151	100.0	

1987 New Jersey general election
Party	Candidate	Votes	%	±%
Democratic	Frank Pallone, Jr.	28,223	60.1	▲9.7
Republican	Gerri Chappell Popkin	18,751	39.9	▼8.6
Total votes		46,974	100.0	

1983 New Jersey general election
Party	Candidate	Votes	%	±%
Democratic	Frank Pallone, Jr.	24,339	50.4	▲9.3
Republican	Brian T. Kennedy	23,412	48.5	▼9.3
Bull Moose	Edgar Van Houten	508	1.1	N/A
Total votes		48,259	100.0	

1981 New Jersey general election
Party	Candidate	Votes	%
Republican	Brian T. Kennedy	32,063	57.8
Democratic	George Callas	22,807	41.1
Citizens	Stan Johnson	574	1.0
Total votes		55,444	100.0

1977 New Jersey general election
Party	Candidate	Votes	%	±%
Republican	S. Thomas Gagliano	30,452	54.5	▲0.4
Democratic	Arthur Goldzweig	24,398	43.7	▼2.2
Libertarian	Anne Caroline Riecker	567	1.0	N/A
Independent	Joseph Rembisz, Jr.	477	0.9	N/A
Total votes		55,894	100.0	

1973 New Jersey general election
Party	Candidate	Votes	%
Republican	Alfred N. Beadleston	27,718	54.1
Democratic	H. Joseph Dietz	23,564	45.9
Total votes		51,282	100.0

=== General Assembly ===
2021 New Jersey general election
Party	Candidate	Votes	%	±%
Republican	Marilyn Piperno	35,336	25.1	▲1.3
Republican	Kimberly Eulner	35,177	24.9	▲1.9
Democratic	Joann Downey	34,830	24.7	▼1.9
Democratic	Eric Houghtaling	34,555	24.5	▼2.1
Green	Dominique Faison	1,152	0.8	N/A
Total votes		141,050	100.0	

2019 New Jersey general election
Party	Candidate	Votes	%	±%
Democratic	Joann Downey	23,151	26.6	▼1.1
Democratic	Eric Houghtaling	23,083	26.6	▼0.8
Republican	Michael Amoroso	20,670	23.8	▲1.2
Republican	Matthew C. Woolley	20,002	23.0	▲0.7
Total votes		86,906	100.0	

New Jersey general election, 2017
Party	Candidate	Votes	%	±%
Democratic	Joann Downey	31,347	27.7	▲2.5
Democratic	Eric Houghtaling	31,012	27.4	▲1.8
Republican	Robert Acerra	25,672	22.6	▼2.2
Republican	Michael Whelan	25,320	22.3	▼2.1
Total votes		113,351	100.0	

New Jersey general election, 2015
Party	Candidate	Votes	%	±%
Democratic	Eric Houghtaling	15,149	25.6	▲5.0
Democratic	Joann Downey	14,906	25.2	▲5.0
Republican	Mary Pat Angelini	14,653	24.8	▼5.3
Republican	Caroline Casagrande	14,418	24.4	▼4.7
Total votes		59,126	100.0	

New Jersey general election, 2013
Party	Candidate	Votes	%	±%
Republican	Mary Pat Angelini	29,842	30.1	▲3.7
Republican	Caroline Casagrande	28,827	29.1	▲2.3
Democratic	Kevin McMillan	20,406	20.6	▼1.4
Democratic	Edward Zipprich	19,968	20.2	▼1.3
Total votes		99,043	100.0	

New Jersey general election, 2011
Party	Candidate	Votes	%
Republican	Caroline Casagrande	18,739	26.8
Republican	Mary Pat Angelini	18,479	26.4
Democratic	Vin Gopal	15,392	22.0
Democratic	Kathleen Horgan	15,060	21.5
Demand A Voice	Daniel Jacobson	2,358	3.4
Total votes		70,028	100.0

New Jersey general election, 2009
Party	Candidate	Votes	%	±%
Republican	Mary Pat Angelini	36,278	30.9	▲1.8
Republican	David P. Rible	35,936	30.7	▲1.6
Democratic	J. Randy Bishop	22,956	19.6	▼2.1
Democratic	Richard J. Bolger	22,063	18.8	▼1.3
Total votes		117,233	100.0	

New Jersey general election, 2007
Party	Candidate	Votes	%	±%
Republican	David P. Rible	24,641	29.1	▲3.1
Republican	Mary Pat Angelini	24,638	29.1	▲3.4
Democratic	John P. Napolitani Sr.	18,316	21.7	▼2.6
Democratic	John J. Pirnat	16,970	20.1	▼3.9
Total votes		84,565	100.0	

New Jersey general election, 2005
Party	Candidate	Votes	%	±%
Republican	Sean Kean	31,527	26.0	▼2.9
Republican	Steve Corodemus	31,136	25.7	▼4.6
Democratic	Matt Doherty	29,489	24.3	▲6.6
Democratic	Jim Reilly	29,051	24.0	▲7.0
Total votes		121,203	100.0	

New Jersey general election, 2003
Party	Candidate	Votes	%	±%
Republican	Steve Corodemus	23,599	30.3	▲1.3
Republican	Sean Kean	22,480	28.9	▲2.0
Democratic	Charles "Chuck" Davis	13,791	17.7	▼4.2
Democratic	John Loffredo	13,205	17.0	▼3.7
Green	Lynn Surgalla	2,383	3.1	N/A
Green	Thomas Auletta	2,366	3.0	N/A
Total votes		77,824	100.0	

New Jersey general election, 2001
Party	Candidate	Votes	%
Republican	Steve Corodemus	34,002	29.0
Republican	Tom Smith	31,554	26.9
Democratic	Jim Reilly	25,674	21.9
Democratic	Warren Goode	24,267	20.7
Libertarian	Robert Hull	676	0.6
Libertarian	John M. Taylor	658	0.6
Lower Taxes Now	Karen Zaletel	592	0.5
Total votes		117,423	100.0

New Jersey general election, 1999
Party	Candidate	Votes	%	±%
Republican	Steve Corodemus	20,858	30.1	▼1.3
Republican	Tom Smith	20,271	29.2	▼2.2
Democratic	Michael Beson	13,304	19.2	▲0.5
Democratic	Dwayne M. Harris	12,789	18.4	▲1.7
Libertarian	Barbara A. Jones	725	1.0	N/A
Conservative	Leonard P. Marshall	524	0.8	▼0.1
Conservative	Wayne E. May	511	0.7	▼0.2
Reform!	Jonathan Moschberger	372	0.5	N/A
Total votes		69,354	100.0	

New Jersey general election, 1997
Party	Candidate	Votes	%	±%
Republican	Steve Corodemus	36,447	31.4	▲4.6
Republican	Tom Smith	36,379	31.4	▲4.8
Democratic	Matthew Donovan	21,673	18.7	▼2.1
Democratic	James Famularo	19,381	16.7	▼4.9
Conservative	Tom Holthausen	1,080	0.9	▼0.9
Conservative	Art Post	1,000	0.9	▼0.7
Total votes		115,960	100.0	

New Jersey general election, 1995
Party	Candidate	Votes	%	±%
Republican	Steve Corodemus	19,786	26.8	▲0.3
Republican	Tom Smith	19,588	26.6	▼0.3
Democratic	Patricia S. Murray	15,933	21.6	▼1.3
Democratic	Matthew M. Donovan	15,314	20.8	▼0.8
Conservative	Tom Appleby	1,357	1.8	▲1.0
Conservative	Michael Connelly, Jr.	1,211	1.6	▲0.8
Natural Law	Patricia A. Bily	274	0.4	N/A
Natural Law	Frances M. Nikovits	262	0.4	N/A
Total votes		73,725	100.0	

New Jersey general election, 1993
Party	Candidate	Votes	%	±%
Republican	Tom Smith	33,190	26.9	▲1.4
Republican	Steve Corodemus	32,748	26.5	▲1.1
Democratic	John A. Villapiano	28,259	22.9	▲0.5
Democratic	Daniel P. Jacobson	26,675	21.6	▲1.0
Conservative	Allen Lorentson	938	0.8	N/A
Conservative	Anthony Rajoppe	937	0.8	N/A
Libertarian	Keith Quarles	723	0.6	N/A
Total votes		123,470	100.0	

1991 New Jersey general election
Party	Candidate	Votes	%
Republican	Tom Smith	27,024	25.5
Republican	Steve Corodemus	26,966	25.4
Democratic	John A. Villapiano	23,703	22.4
Democratic	Daniel P. Jacobson	21,864	20.6
Truth in Government	James W. Manning	3,750	3.5
I Represent You	Robert J. Furlong, Sr.	2,653	2.5
Total votes		105,960	100.0

1989 New Jersey general election
Party	Candidate	Votes	%	±%
Democratic	John A. Villapiano	36,655	30.6	▲9.1
Democratic	Daniel P. Jacobson	30,282	25.2	▲4.9
Republican	Paul A. Kapalko	28,100	23.4	▼4.7
Republican	Dennis G. Sternberg	24,928	20.8	▼7.0
Total votes		119,965	100.0	

Special election, September 15, 1988
Party	Candidate	Votes	%
Democratic	John A. Villapiano	14,513	53.4
Republican	Thomas M. Villane	12,162	44.8
Libertarian	Lucille Bender	323	1.2
The Education Solution	Joshua Leinsdorf	168	0.6
Total votes		27,166	100.0

1987 New Jersey general election
Party	Candidate	Votes	%	±%
Republican	Joseph A. Palaia	25,973	28.1	▼6.3
Republican	Anthony M. Doc Villane, Jr.	25,725	27.8	▼6.3
Democratic	John D'Amico, Jr.	19,868	21.5	▲5.7
Democratic	Joseph Quinn	18,743	20.3	▲4.6
Compulsory Education Law	Mary K. Blohm	1,134	1.2	N/A
Compulsory Education Law	Joshua Leinsdorf	942	1.0	N/A
Total votes		92,385	100.0	

1985 New Jersey general election
Party	Candidate	Votes	%	±%
Republican	Joseph A. Palaia	35,629	34.4	▲5.1
Republican	Anthony M. “Doc” Villane	35,291	34.1	▲4.9
Democratic	Craig Alan Frankel	16,298	15.8	▼5.0
Democratic	Daniel P. Jacobson	16,242	15.7	▼5.1
Total votes		103,460	100.0	

New Jersey general election, 1983
Party	Candidate	Votes	%	±%
Republican	Joseph A. Palaia	27,222	29.3	▲0.1
Republican	Anthony M. “Doc” Villane	27,174	29.2	▼1.4
Democratic	Martin S. Chomsky	19,303	20.8	▲0.6
Democratic	Cornelius V. “Neil” Kelly	19,297	20.8	▲1.8
Total votes		92,996	100.0	

New Jersey general election, 1981
Party	Candidate	Votes	%
Republican	Anthony M. (Doc) Villane	33,768	30.6
Republican	Joseph A. Palaia	32,204	29.2
Democratic	Joan Kiernan	22,231	20.2
Democratic	John P. Clancy	20,920	19.0
Citizens	John H. Walton	551	0.5
Citizens	Helena McCurdy	546	0.5
Total votes		110,220	100.0

New Jersey general election, 1979
Party	Candidate	Votes	%	±%
Republican	Marie Sheehan Muhler	29,850	28.5	▲2.4
Republican	John O. Bennett	27,571	26.3	▲1.2
Democratic	Walter J. Kozloski	23,375	22.3	▼3.0
Democratic	Stephen F. Duffy	22,610	21.6	▼1.4
Independent	Joshua Leinsdorf	1,418	1.4	N/A
Total votes		104,824	100.0	

New Jersey general election, 1977
Party	Candidate	Votes	%	±%
Republican	Marie A. Muhler	28,519	26.1	▲1.3
Democratic	Walter J. Kozloski	27,649	25.3	▲0.3
Republican	John I. Dawes	27,436	25.1	▲0.5
Democratic	Peter E. Donoghue	25,223	23.0	▼1.6
Libertarian	Elizabeth Macron	614	0.6	▼0.4
Total votes		109,441	100.0	

New Jersey general election, 1975
Party	Candidate	Votes	%	±%
Democratic	Walter J. Kozloski	26,731	25.0	▼1.6
Republican	Marie A. Muhler	26,589	24.8	▲1.3
Democratic	Morton Salkind	26,318	24.6	▼2.6
Republican	Jerome U. Burke	26,303	24.6	▲1.9
Libertarian	Ronald K. Wishart	1,096	1.0	N/A
Total votes		107,037	100.0	

New Jersey general election, 1973
Party	Candidate	Votes	%
Democratic	Morton Salkind	27,450	27.2
Democratic	Walter J. Kozloski	26,873	26.6
Republican	S. Thomas Gagliano	23,795	23.5
Republican	Robert N. Ferrell	22,950	22.7
Total votes		101,068	100.0

== Election results, 1965–1973 ==
=== Senate ===
1965 New Jersey general election
Party	Candidate	Votes	%
Democratic	Nicholas T. Fernicola	145,589	13.7
Democratic	Maclyn S. Goldman	143,795	13.5
Democratic	John J. Giblin	143,040	13.4
Democratic	Hutchins F. Inge	135,959	12.8
Republican	C. Robert Sarcone	128,815	12.1
Republican	Irwin I. Kimmelman	116,205	10.9
Republican	James E. Churchman, Jr.	112,995	10.6
Republican	William F. Tompkins	112,128	10.5
United Political Freedom	George C. Richardson	10,409	1.0
United Political Freedom	Kenrick O. Stephenson	5,970	0.6
United Political Freedom	David Blumgart	5,305	0.5
United Political Freedom	Fredrick Waring	4,476	0.4
Total votes		1,064,686	100.0

1967 New Jersey general election
Party	Candidate	Votes	%
Republican	Michael A. Giuliano	122,354	9.6
Republican	Gerardo L. Del Tufo	119,956	9.4
Republican	Alexander J. Matturri	119,152	9.3
Republican	James H. Wallwork	118,834	9.3
Republican	Milton A. Waldor	117,280	9.2
Republican	David W. Dowd	115,568	9.0
Democratic	Nicholas T. Fernicola	91,812	7.2
Democratic	John J. Giblin	89,297	7.0
Democratic	Maclyn S. Goldman	88,796	6.9
Democratic	David Mandelbaum	85,131	6.7
Democratic	Victor F. Addonizio	83,587	6.5
Democratic	Hutchins F. Inge	83,543	6.5
Essex Conservative	John P. Keelan	5,196	0.4
Essex Conservative	Marion Carluccio	5,140	0.4
Essex Conservative	William Murray	4,906	0.4
Essex Conservative	Joseph R. Garrity	4,657	0.4
Essex Conservative	Edmund O. Matzal	4,337	0.3
Essex Conservative	James W. Lomker	4,096	0.3
Conservative	Harrison P. Smith, Jr.	2,484	0.2
Public Employee Candidate	James Larry Giordano	2,427	0.2
Conservative	William Barbetta	2,412	0.2
Conservative	Gladis P. Smith	2,086	0.2
Conservative	James H. Flynn	1,987	0.2
Conservative	Frank De George	1,804	0.1
Socialist Workers	Joseph Carroll	1,507	0.1
Total votes		1,278,349	100.0

Special election, November 2, 1971
Party	Candidate	Votes	%
Democratic	Charles DeMarco	83,525	46.9
Republican	Nicholas LaSpina	76,352	42.9
Essex Bi-Partisan	Frank J. Messina	18,095	10.2
Total votes		177,972	100.0

1971 New Jersey general election
Party	Candidate	Votes	%
Republican	Michael A. Giuliano	92,166	9.8
Democratic	Ralph C. DeRose	91,380	9.7
Republican	James H. Wallwork	88,632	9.5
Democratic	Frank J. Dodd	86,041	9.18
Democratic	Wynona M. Lipman	85,644	9.14
Republican	Milton A. Waldor	84,736	9.04
Democratic	Martin L. Greenberg	82,291	8.8
Republican	Matthew G. Carter	77,418	8.3
Democratic	Henry W. Smolen	76,190	8.1
Republican	Frederic Remington	73,663	7.9
Essex Bi-Partisan	John J. Giblin	21,688	2.3
Essex Bi-Partisan	John F. Monica	21,072	2.2
Essex Bi-Partisan	Sylvester L. Casta	19,015	2.0
Essex Bi-Partisan	Joseph J. Bradley	16,348	1.7
Essex Bi-Partisan	Richard P. Weitzman	15,733	1.7
Unity-Victory-Progress	Joseph A. Santiago	5,483	0.6
Total votes		937,500	100.0

=== General Assembly ===
==== District 11A ====
New Jersey general election, 1967
Party	Candidate	Votes	%
Democratic	George Richardson	13,329	33.1
Democratic	Walter J. Vohdin	11,506	28.6
Republican	Joseph J. Bradley	8,009	19.9
Republican	Jesse W. Mapson	7,383	18.4
Total votes		40,227	100.0

New Jersey general election, 1969
Party	Candidate	Votes	%
Democratic	Paul Policastro	16,400	29.5
Democratic	James P. Lordi	16,252	29.2
Republican	Raymond F. Bossert	10,549	19.0
Republican	Charles J. Chirichiello	10,173	18.3
National Conservative	Joseph T. De Vizzio	1,180	2.1
National Conservative	Melville Bowers	1,046	1.9
Total votes		55,600	100.0

New Jersey general election, 1971
Party	Candidate	Votes	%
Democratic	George C. Richardson	14,135	36.1
Democratic	Ronald Owens	13,724	35.1
Republican	Donald J. Scott	3,994	10.2
Republican	Albert Mikuli	2,699	6.9
Essex Bi-Partisan	Albert Cernadas	2,668	6.8
Essex Bi-Partisan	John L. Pelt	1,888	4.8
Total votes		39,108	100.0

==== District 11B ====
New Jersey general election, 1967
Party	Candidate	Votes	%
Democratic	Paul Policastro	12,838	30.3
Democratic	Ronald Owens	12,766	30.1
Republican	Philip Insabella	8,468	20.0
Republican	Sidney J. Brown	7,143	16.9
Essex Conservative	Melville Bowers	1,145	2.7
Total votes		42,360	100.0

New Jersey general election, 1969
Party	Candidate	Votes	%
Democratic	George C. Richardson	18,647	40.8
Democratic	Ronald Owens	17,719	38.8
Republican	Jesse Wendell Mapson	5,403	11.8
Republican	Martha A. Daniels	3,912	8.6
Total votes		45,681	100.0

New Jersey general election, 1971
Party	Candidate	Votes	%
For The People	Anthony Imperiale	13,857	23.6
Democratic	Frank G. Megaro	12,436	21.2
Democratic	Paul Policastro	10,825	18.4
Republican	C. Richard Fiore	8,215	14.0
Republican	Ralph D’Ambola	7,351	12.5
Essex Bi-Partisan	Ronald J. Del Mauro	3,323	5.7
Essex Bi-Partisan	Nicholas A. Ciufi III	2,729	4.6
Total votes		58,736	100.0

==== District 11C ====
New Jersey general election, 1967
Party	Candidate	Votes	%
Republican	Ralph R. Caputo	19,311	28.5
Republican	C. Richard Fiore	19,293	28.5
Democratic	Armand E. Lembo	14,720	21.8
Democratic	Joseph G. Biancardi	14,347	21.2
Total votes		67,671	100.0

New Jersey general election, 1969
Party	Candidate	Votes	%
Republican	Ralph R. Caputo	23,745	28.7
Republican	C. Richard Fiore	23,383	28.3
Democratic	Carmen A. Orechio	17,849	21.6
Democratic	Joseph L. Iannuzzi	17,640	21.4
Total votes		82,617	100.0

New Jersey general election, 1971
Party	Candidate	Votes	%
Republican	Carl A. Orechio	28,344	27.0
Republican	John N. Dennis	27,278	26.0
Democratic	Peter A. Torre, Jr.	19,849	18.9
Democratic	David W. Conrad	18,894	18.0
Essex Bi-Partisan	Fred O. Perrotti	5,876	5.6
Essex Bi-Partisan	William A. Corda	4,760	4.5
Total votes		105,001	100.0

==== District 11D ====
New Jersey general election, 1967
Party	Candidate	Votes	%
Republican	Kenneth T. Wilson	19,281	25.6
Democratic	Frank J. Dodd	19,101	25.3
Republican	Donald F. MacArt	18,845	25.0
Democratic	Thomas H. Cooke, Jr.	17,816	23.6
Independent	Lewis Bateman	341	0.5
Total votes		75,384	100.0

New Jersey general election, 1969
Party	Candidate	Votes	%
Republican	Herbert M. Rinaldi	26,754	26.7
Republican	David Goldfarb	25,653	25.6
Democratic	Joseph P. Barry, Jr.	23,943	23.9
Democratic	Edward J. Lynch	23,834	23.8
Total votes		100,184	100.0

New Jersey general election, 1971
Party	Candidate	Votes	%
Democratic	Eldridge Hawkins	18,896	22.86
Democratic	Peter G. Stewart	18,877	22.84
Republican	John F. Trezza	18,864	22.82
Republican	Kenneth T. Wilson	18,695	22.6
Essex Bi-Partisan	Peter E. O’Gara	3,699	4.5
Essex Bi-Partisan	Anna M. Jannelli	3,617	4.4
Total votes		82,648	100.0

==== District 11E ====
New Jersey general election, 1967
Party	Candidate	Votes	%
Republican	Herbert M. Rinaldi	31,705	33.4
Republican	John N. Dennis	31,239	32.9
Democratic	Ralph G. Conte	15,710	16.5
Democratic	John J. Regan	15,344	16.2
Conservative	Melvin A. Ramsey	503	0.5
Conservative	Winfred O. Perry	465	0.5
Total votes		94,966	100.0

New Jersey general election, 1969
Party	Candidate	Votes	%
Republican	Kenneth T. Wilson	28,233	26.2
Republican	John N. Dennis	27,890	25.9
Democratic	Frank J. Dodd	27,016	25.1
Democratic	William J. Fusco	24,658	22.9
Total votes		107,797	100.0

New Jersey general election, 1971
Party	Candidate	Votes	%
Republican	Thomas H. Kean	28,728	30.2
Republican	Philip D. Kaltenbacher	27,943	29.4
Democratic	Harry A. McEnroe, Jr.	16,403	17.2
Democratic	Gerard M. Simons	16,354	17.2
Essex Bi-Partisan	Lawrence J. Kosisko	2,871	3.0
Essex Bi-Partisan	Charles T. Merrigan	2,832	3.0
Total votes		95,131	100.0

==== District 11F ====
New Jersey general election, 1967
Party	Candidate	Votes	%
Republican	Philip D. Kaltenbacher	32,825	32.8
Republican	Thomas H. Kean	32,675	32.6
Democratic	Bernard A. Kuttner	17,964	17.9
Democratic	Eugene E. McNany	16,702	16.7
Total votes		100,166	100.0

New Jersey general election, 1969
Party	Candidate	Votes	%
Republican	Thomas H. Kean	38,680	31.7
Republican	Philip D. Kaltenbacher	38,218	31.3
Democratic	Harvey Marcus Sklaw	21,437	17.6
Democratic	Gerard Maurice Simons	21,407	17.6
Essex Conservative	Willard Freeman	1,146	0.9
Essex Conservative	Stephen S. Boub	1,060	0.9
Total votes		121,948	100.0
