= 1977 New Jersey Senate election =

1977 New Jersey State Senate elections
- November 8, 1977

All 40 seats in the New Jersey State Senate 21 seats needed for a majority
- Turnout: 59% (▼2pp)
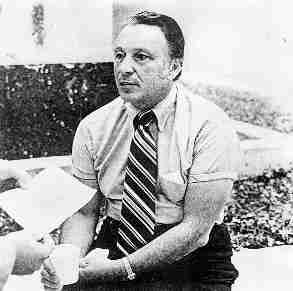

| | Majority party | Minority party | Third party |
|---|---|---|---|
| Leader | Matthew Feldman (stepped down) | James Cafiero (stepped down) |
| Party | Democratic | Republican | Independent |
| Leader since | January 8, 1974 | January 13, 1976 |
| Leader's seat | 37th (Teaneck) | 1st (North Wildwood) |
| Last election | 29 | 10 | 1 |
| Seats before | 28 | 10 | 1 |
| Seats won | 27 | 13 | 0 |
| Seat change | ▼1 | ▲3 | ▼1 |
| Popular vote | 1,066,812 | 864,431 |
| Percentage | 53.5% | 43.4% |
- Results by district Democratic hold Democratic gain Republican hold Republican gain
Senate President before election
Matthew Feldman
Democratic
Elected Senate President
Joseph P. Merlino
Democratic

The 1977 New Jersey Senate election coincided with Brendan Byrne's re-election to a second term as Governor of New Jersey.

The election coincided with Governor Brendan Byrne's re-election over Senator Raymond Bateman. Byrne narrowly survived a primary election that eliminated seven incumbent Democratic Senators. Despite the intra-party division and early polls indicating Byrne was an underdog in the general election, Byrne survived and the Democrats preserved their large majority in the Senate, with Republicans only gaining three seats. Republicans flipped districts 6, 10, 14, and 23, while Democrats flipped districts 30 (from a Democrat-turned-independent) and 35.

This is the last time Democrats held a veto-proof majority in the chamber. Democrats chose Joseph P. Merlino as the Senate President and Carmen Orechio as Majority Leader; Republicans named Garrett Hagedorn as Minority Leader.

== Incumbents not running for re-election ==
=== Democratic ===
- John A. Lynch Sr. (District 17)
- Alexander J. Menza (District 20) (ran for U.S. Senator)
- Raymond Garramone (District 39) (ran for Governor)

=== Republican ===
- Alfred N. Beadleston (District 11)
- Raymond Bateman (District 16) (ran for Governor)
- Frank Davenport (District 35)

== Incumbents defeated ==
=== In primary elections ===
==== Democratic ====
- District 2: Joseph McGahn (Atlantic) lost party support to Steven P. Perskie, an Assemblyman from Atlantic County.
- District 6: Alene Ammond (Camden) lost the primary to Victor Pachter.
- District 7: Edward J. Hughes (Burlington) lost the primary to Charles B. Yates.
- District 19: John Fay (Middlesex) lost the primary to Laurence Weiss.
- District 21: Thomas Dunn (Union) lost party support to John Gregorio, an Assemblyman from Union County and mayor of Linden.
- District 31: James P. Dugan (Hudson) lost the primary to Wally Sheil, the President of Hudson County Community College.
- District 32: Joseph W. Tumulty (Hudson) lost the primary to David Friedland, a former Assemblyman from Hudson County.

=== In general elections ===
==== Democratic ====
- District 10: Herbert Buehler (Monmouth) lost to Republican Brian Kennedy, a former Assemblyman from Monmouth County.
- District 23: Stephen Wiley (Morris) lost to Republican John H. Dorsey, an Assemblyman from Morris County.

==== Independent ====
- District 2: After losing the Democratic primary, Senator Joseph McGahn ran as an independent in the general election; he finished third behind Perskie and Republican F. Frederick Perone.
- District 21: After losing the Democratic primary, Senator Thomas Dunn ran as an independent in the general election; he finished second behind Gregorio.
- District 30: Anthony Imperiale (Essex) was defeated by Democrat Frank E. Rodgers, the mayor of Harrison.

== Open seats ==
=== Democratic holds ===
- District 17: John A. Lynch Sr. (Middlesex) retired. Speaker of the Assembly William J. Hamilton won the open seat.
- District 20: Alexander J. Menza (Union) retired to run for U.S. Senator. Union Township councilman Anthony E. Russo won the open seat.
- District 39: Raymond Garramone (Bergen) retired to run for Governor. Former Bergen County Freeholder Frank Herbert won the open seat.

=== Democratic gains ===
- District 35: Republican Frank Davenport did not seek re-election. Frank X. Graves Jr., the mayor of Paterson, defeated former Assemblyman Alfred Fontanella.

=== Republican holds ===
- District 11: Alfred N. Beadleston (Monmouth) retired. Former Monmouth County Surrogate S. Thomas Gagliano won the open seat.
- District 17: Raymond Bateman (Somserset) retired to run for Governor. Assemblyman John H. Ewing won the open seat.

=== Republican gains ===
- District 6: Alene Ammond (Camden) lost the Democratic primary to Victor Pachter; Pachter lost the general election to Republican Lee Laskin, a former Assemblyman.
- District 14: Anne Clark Martindell (Mercer) was appointed U.S. Ambassador to New Zealand in May, leaving her seat vacant; Republican Walter E. Foran, an Assemblyman from Hunterdon County, won the open seat.

== Summary of results by district ==
| District | Incumbent | Party | Elected Senator | Party |
|---|---|---|---|---|
| 1st Legislative District | James Cafiero | Rep | James Cafiero | Rep |
| 2nd Legislative District | Joseph McGahn | Dem | Steven P. Perskie | Dem |
| 3rd Legislative District | Raymond Zane | Dem | Raymond Zane | Dem |
| 4th Legislative District | Joseph A. Maressa | Dem | Joseph A. Maressa | Dem |
| 5th Legislative District | Angelo Errichetti (Note: Errichetti, who was also mayor of Camden, was chosen to succeed Senator John J. Horn in 1976. Horn joined Governor Byrne's cabinet as Commissioner of Labor and Industry.) | Dem | Angelo Errichetti | Dem |
| 6th Legislative District | Alene Ammond | Dem | Lee B. Laskin | Rep |
| 7th Legislative District | Edward J. Hughes | Dem | Charles B. Yates | Dem |
| 8th Legislative District | Barry T. Parker | Rep | Barry T. Parker | Rep |
| 9th Legislative District | John F. Russo | Dem | John F. Russo | Dem |
| 10th Legislative District | Herbert J. Buehler | Dem | Brian T. Kennedy | Rep |
| 11th Legislative District | Alfred N. Beadleston | Rep | S. Thomas Gagliano | Rep |
| 12th Legislative District | Eugene J. Bedell | Dem | Eugene J. Bedell | Dem |
| 13th Legislative District | Joseph P. Merlino | Dem | Joseph P. Merlino | Dem |
| 14th Legislative District | Vacant (Note: Senator Anne Clark Martindell resigned on May 17 to join the Jimmy Carter administration.) | | Walter E. Foran | Rep |
| 15th Legislative District | Wayne Dumont | Rep | Wayne Dumont | Rep |
| 16th Legislative District | Raymond Bateman | Rep | John H. Ewing | Rep |
| 17th Legislative District | John A. Lynch Sr. | Dem | William J. Hamilton | Dem |
| 18th Legislative District | Bernard Dwyer | Dem | Bernard Dwyer | Dem |
| 19th Legislative District | John Fay | Dem | Laurence Weiss | Dem |
| 20th Legislative District | Alexander J. Menza | Dem | Anthony E. Russo | Dem |
| 21st Legislative District | Thomas G. Dunn | Dem | John Gregorio | Dem |
| 22nd Legislative District | Peter J. McDonough | Rep | Peter J. McDonough | Rep |
| 23rd Legislative District | Stephen B. Wiley | Dem | John H. Dorsey | Rep |
| 24th Legislative District | James P. Vreeland | Rep | James P. Vreeland | Rep |
| 25th Legislative District | James Wallwork | Rep | James Wallwork | Rep |
| 26th Legislative District | Frank J. Dodd | Dem | Frank J. Dodd | Dem |
| 27th Legislative District | Carmen Orechio | Dem | Carmen Orechio | Dem |
| 28th Legislative District | Martin L. Greenberg | Dem | Martin L. Greenberg | Dem |
| 29th Legislative District | Wynona Lipman | Dem | Wynona Lipman | Dem |
| 30th Legislative District | Anthony Imperiale | Ind | Frank E. Rodgers | Dem |
| 31st Legislative District | James P. Dugan | Dem | Wally Sheil | Dem |
| 32nd Legislative District | Joseph W. Tumulty | Dem | David Friedland | Dem |
| 33rd Legislative District | William Musto | Dem | William Musto | Dem |
| 34th Legislative District | Joseph Hirkala | Dem | Joseph Hirkala | Dem |
| 35th Legislative District | Frank Davenport | Rep | Frank X. Graves Jr. | Dem |
| 36th Legislative District | Anthony Scardino | Dem | Anthony Scardino | Dem |
| 37th Legislative District | Matthew Feldman | Dem | Matthew Feldman | Dem |
| 38th Legislative District | John Skevin | Dem | John Skevin | Dem |
| 39th Legislative District | Raymond Garramone | Dem | Frank Herbert | Dem |
| 40th Legislative District | Garrett Hagedorn | Rep | Garrett Hagedorn | Rep |

=== Close races ===
Seats where the margin of victory was under 10%:

1. District 27, 1.8%
2. District 20, 1.6%
3. District 6, 4.2% gain
4. District 39, 5.6%
5. District 23, 8.6% gain
6. District 10, 9.5% gain

== District 1 ==
New Jersey general election, 1977
| Party | Candidate | Votes | % | ±% |
|---|---|---|---|---|
| Republican | James Cafiero (incumbent) | 35,416 | 62.0% | ▲3.7 |
| Democratic | Frank Kneiser | 21,702 | 38.0% | ▼3.7 |
| Total votes | | 57,118 | 100.00% | |

== District 2 ==
New Jersey general election, 1977
| Party | Candidate | Votes | % | ±% |
|---|---|---|---|---|
| Democratic | Steven P. Perskie | 31,712 | 47.9% | ▼7.2 |
| Republican | F. Frederick Perone | 20,160 | 30.5% | ▼14.4 |
| Re-Elect, Experience, Integrity | Joseph McGahn (incumbent) | 14,288 | 21.6% | N/A |
| Total votes | | 66,160 | 100.00% | |

== District 3 ==
New Jersey general election, 1977
| Party | Candidate | Votes | % | ±% |
|---|---|---|---|---|
| Democratic | Raymond Zane (incumbent) | 37,199 | 65.8% | ▼14.1 |
| Republican | Robert C. Hendrickson, Jr. | 19,328 | 34.2% | ▲14.1 |
| Total votes | | 56,527 | 100.00% | |

== District 4 ==
New Jersey general election, 1977
| Party | Candidate | Votes | % | ±% |
|---|---|---|---|---|
| Democratic | Joseph A. Maressa (incumbent) | 35,736 | 65.0% | ▲1.2 |
| Republican | Walter C. Gebelein | 19,248 | 35.0% | ▼1.2 |
| Total votes | | 54,984 | 100.00% | |

== District 5 ==
New Jersey general election, 1977
| Party | Candidate | Votes | % | ±% |
|---|---|---|---|---|
| Democratic | Angelo Errichetti (incumbent) | 27,352 | 69.4% | ▲9.1 |
| Republican | Ernest J. Merlino | 12,078 | 30.6% | ▼6.2 |
| Total votes | | 39,430 | 100.00% | |

== District 6 ==
New Jersey general election, 1977
| Party | Candidate | Votes | % | ±% |
|---|---|---|---|---|
| Republican | Lee B. Laskin | 29,823 | 52.1 | ▲5.3 |
| Democratic | Victor Pachter | 27,449 | 47.9 | ▼5.3 |
| Total votes | | 57,272 | 100.00% | |

== District 7 ==
New Jersey general election, 1977
| Party | Candidate | Votes | % | ±% |
|---|---|---|---|---|
| Democratic | Charles B. Yates | 30,793 | 59.5% | ▲1.6 |
| Republican | Michael J. Conda | 20,971 | 40.5% | ▼1.1 |
| Total votes | | 51,764 | 100.00% | |

== District 8 ==
New Jersey general election, 1977
| Party | Candidate | Votes | % | ±% |
|---|---|---|---|---|
| Republican | Barry T. Parker (incumbent) | 30,042 | 55.4% | ▲2.6 |
| Democratic | Charles H. Ryan | 24,168 | 44.6% | ▼2.6 |
| Total votes | | 54,210 | 100.00% | |

== District 9 ==
New Jersey general election, 1977
| Party | Candidate | Votes | % | ±% |
|---|---|---|---|---|
| Democratic | John F. Russo (incumbent) | 53,309 | 63.7% | ▲9.2 |
| Republican | James J. Mancini | 28,673 | 34.3% | ▼11.2 |
| Libertarian | Leonard T. Flynn | 1,153 | 1.4% | N/A |
| Independent | Donald Knause | 494 | 0.6% | N/A |
| Total votes | | 83,629 | 100.00% | |

== District 10 ==
New Jersey general election, 1977
| Party | Candidate | Votes | % | ±% |
|---|---|---|---|---|
| Republican | Brian T. Kennedy | 29,059 | 54.3% | ▲9.4 |
| Democratic | Herbert J. Buehler (incumbent) | 23,990 | 44.8% | ▼10.3 |
| Let's Work Together | Franco DiDomenica | 502 | 0.9% | N/A |
| Total votes | | 53,551 | 100.00% | |

== District 11 ==
New Jersey general election, 1977
| Party | Candidate | Votes | % | ±% |
|---|---|---|---|---|
| Republican | S. Thomas Gagliano | 30,452 | 54.5% | ▲0.4 |
| Democratic | Arthur Goldzweig | 24,398 | 43.7% | ▼2.2 |
| Libertarian | Anne Caroline Riecker | 567 | 1.0% | N/A |
| Independent | Joseph Rembisz, Jr. | 477 | 0.9% | N/A |
| Total votes | | 55,894 | 100.00% | |

== District 12 ==
New Jersey general election, 1977
| Party | Candidate | Votes | % | ±% |
|---|---|---|---|---|
| Democratic | Eugene J. Bedell (incumbent) | 28,391 | 53.6% | ▼5.2 |
| Republican | Joseph Azzolina | 21,877 | 41.3% | ▲6.1 |
| Independent | Eileen Lloyd | 2,435 | 4.6% | N/A |
| Libertarian | Jack Moyers | 261 | 0.5% | N/A |
| Total votes | | 52,964 | 100.00% | |

== District 13 ==
New Jersey general election, 1977
| Party | Candidate | Votes | % | ±% |
|---|---|---|---|---|
| Democratic | Joseph P. Merlino (incumbent) | 33,757 | 69.6% | ▼4.8 |
| Republican | Harry L. Dearden | 14,776 | 30.4% | ▲4.8 |
| Total votes | | 48,533 | 100.00% | |

== District 14 ==
New Jersey general election, 1977
| Party | Candidate | Votes | % | ±% |
|---|---|---|---|---|
| Republican | Walter E. Foran (incumbent) | 33,556 | 56.8% | ▲8.3 |
| Democratic | Peter J. Bearse | 25,504 | 43.2% | ▼8.3 |
| Total votes | | 59,060 | 100.00% | |

== District 15 ==
New Jersey general election, 1977
| Party | Candidate | Votes | % | ±% |
|---|---|---|---|---|
| Republican | Wayne Dumont (incumbent) | 35,268 | 60.7% | ▲5.7 |
| Democratic | Joseph J. Keslo | 22,815 | 39.3% | ▼5.7 |
| Total votes | | 58,083 | 100.00% | |

== District 16 ==
1977 general election
| Party | Candidate | Votes | % | ±% |
|---|---|---|---|---|
| Republican | John H. Ewing | 38,772 | 65.2% | ▲1.2 |
| Democratic | Kenneth L. Hetrick | 20,654 | 34.8% | ▼1.2 |
| Total votes | | 59,426 | 100.00% | |

== District 17 ==
1977 general election
| Party | Candidate | Votes | % | ±% |
|---|---|---|---|---|
| Democratic | William J. Hamilton, Jr. | 26,343 | 59.7% | ▼11.0 |
| Republican | Peter J. Selesky | 16,183 | 36.7% | ▲8.3 |
| Independent Candidate | Walter Jinotti | 985 | 2.2% | N/A |
| Repeal Income Tax | Edward J. McGlynn | 638 | 1.4% | N/A |
| Total votes | | 44,149 | 100.00% | |

== District 18 ==
1977 general election
| Party | Candidate | Votes | % | ±% |
|---|---|---|---|---|
| Democratic | Bernard J. Dwyer (incumbent) | 34,144 | 57.6% | ▼5.6 |
| Republican | S. Elliott Mayo | 23,803 | 40.2% | ▲3.4 |
| Independent | Edward R. Gavarny | 1,281 | 2.2% | N/A |
| Total votes | | 59,228 | 100.00% | |

== District 19 ==
1977 general election
| Party | Candidate | Votes | % | ±% |
|---|---|---|---|---|
| Democratic | Laurence S. Weiss | 30,474 | 65.9% | ▼12.7 |
| Republican | Raymond J. Freid | 15,390 | 33.3% | ▲11.9 |
| U.S. Labor | Michael R. Leppig | 396 | 0.9% | N/A |
| Total votes | | 46,260 | 100.00% | |

== District 20 ==
1977 general election
| Party | Candidate | Votes | % | ±% |
|---|---|---|---|---|
| Democratic | Anthony E. Russo | 30,057 | 50.8 | ▼5.5 |
| Republican | Frank X. McDermott | 29,067 | 49.2 | ▲6.0 |
| Total votes | | 59,124 | 100.00% | |

== District 21 ==
1977 general election
| Party | Candidate | Votes | % | ±% |
|---|---|---|---|---|
| Democratic | John T. Gregorio | 20,255 | 46.9% | ▼15.8 |
| Re-elect Experience, Courage | Thomas G. Dunn (incumbent) | 13,932 | 32.2% | N/A |
| Republican | Robert T. Walsh | 8,005 | 18.5% | ▼16.0 |
| Repeal Income Tax | Rocco J. Gallo | 1,023 | 2.4% | N/A |
| Total votes | | 43,215 | 100.00% | |

== District 22 ==
1977 general election
| Party | Candidate | Votes | % | ±% |
|---|---|---|---|---|
| Republican | Peter McDonough (incumbent) | 28,669 | 55.2% | ▲2.9 |
| Democratic | Harry P. Pappas | 22,032 | 42.5% | ▼5.2 |
| An Independent Choice | John J. Carone | 1,198 | 2.3% | N/A |
| Total votes | | 51,899 | 100.00% | |

== District 23 ==
1977 general election
| Party | Candidate | Votes | % | ±% |
|---|---|---|---|---|
| Republican | John H. Dorsey | 30,882 | 54.3% | ▲7.4 |
| Democratic | Stephen B. Wiley (incumbent) | 25,981 | 45.7% | ▼7.4 |
| Total votes | | 56,863 | 100.0 | |

== District 24 ==
1977 general election
| Party | Candidate | Votes | % | ±% |
|---|---|---|---|---|
| Republican | James P. Vreeland | 34,694 | 67.1% | ▲14.5 |
| Democratic | Norma K. Herzfeld | 17,036 | 32.9% | ▼14.5 |
| Total votes | | 51,730 | 100.00% | |

== District 25 ==
1977 general election
| Party | Candidate | Votes | % | ±% |
|---|---|---|---|---|
| Republican | James Wallwork | 35,517 | 60.6% | ▲6.4 |
| Democratic | Lewis J. Paper | 23,096 | 39.4% | ▼6.4 |
| Total votes | | 58,613 | 100.00% | |

== District 26 ==
1977 general election
| Party | Candidate | Votes | % | ±% |
|---|---|---|---|---|
| Democratic | Frank J. Dodd | 27,293 | 75.0% | ▼0.1 |
| Republican | Nancy Jane Schron | 8,847 | 24.3% | ▼0.6 |
| Libertarian | Kenneth R. Kaplan | 250 | 0.7% | N/A |
| Total votes | | 36,390 | 100.00% | |

== District 27 ==
1977 general election
| Party | Candidate | Votes | % | ±% |
|---|---|---|---|---|
| Democratic | Carmen A. Orechio | 25,773 | 50.9% | ▼2.2 |
| Republican | John N. Dennis | 24,855 | 49.1% | ▲2.2 |
| Total votes | | 50,628 | 100.00% | |

== District 28 ==
1977 general election
| Party | Candidate | Votes | % | ±% |
|---|---|---|---|---|
| Democratic | Martin L. Greenberg | 16,986 | 57.8% | ▼2.5 |
| Republican | James A. Pindar | 11,399 | 38.8% | ▲2.0 |
| Income Tax Referendum | Nicholas T. Fernicola | 770 | 2.6% | N/A |
| Jobs, Equality, Peace | Charles E. Cascone | 234 | 0.8% | N/A |
| Total votes | | 29,389 | 100.00% | |

== District 29 ==
1977 general election
| Party | Candidate | Votes | % | ±% |
|---|---|---|---|---|
| Democratic | Wynona Lipman | 16,037 | 90.6% | ▲6.8 |
| Republican | Manuel Angel Colon | 1,658 | 9.4% | ▼6.8 |
| Total votes | | 17,695 | 100.00% | |

== District 30 ==
1977 general election
| Party | Candidate | Votes | % | ±% |
|---|---|---|---|---|
| Democratic | Frank E. Rodgers | 20,081 | 48.0% | ▲11.6 |
| Anti-Tax Candidate | Anthony Imperiale | 14,771 | 35.3% | ▼14.0 |
| Republican | Harry J. Romeo | 6,946 | 16.6% | ▲2.4 |
| Total votes | | 41,798 | 100.00% | |

== District 31 ==
1977 general election
| Party | Candidate | Votes | % | ±% |
|---|---|---|---|---|
| Democratic | Wally Sheil | 26,872 | 70.6% | ▼8.9 |
| Republican | Edward T. Magee | 11,191 | 29.4% | ▲8.9 |
| Total votes | | 38,063 | 100.00% | |

== District 32 ==
1977 general election
| Party | Candidate | Votes | % | ±% |
|---|---|---|---|---|
| Democratic | David Friedland | 26,813 | 67.5% | ▼7.2 |
| Republican | Joseph W. Gallagher | 11,817 | 29.8% | ▲6.9 |
| Politicians Are Crooks | Herbert H. Shaw | 1,082 | 2.7% | N/A |
| Total votes | | 39,712 | '100.00%' | |

== District 33 ==
1977 general election
| Party | Candidate | Votes | % | ±% |
|---|---|---|---|---|
| Democratic | William Musto | 25,270 | 71.8% | ▼6.2 |
| Republican | Michael A. Litzas | 7,244 | 20.6% | ▼1.4 |
| Repeal Income Tax | William J. Meehan | 1,719 | 4.9% | N/A |
| For The People | Eulalio Jose Negrin | 966 | 2.7% | N/A |
| Total votes | | 35,199 | '100.00%' | |

== District 34 ==
1977 general election
| Party | Candidate | Votes | % | ±% |
|---|---|---|---|---|
| Democratic | Joseph Hirkala | 28,628 | 69.6% | ▲5.7 |
| Republican | Herman Schmidt | 12,484 | 30.4% | ▼5.7 |
| Total votes | | 41,112 | 100.00 | |

== District 35 ==
1977 general election
| Party | Candidate | Votes | % | ±% |
|---|---|---|---|---|
| Democratic | Frank X. Graves Jr. | 17,005 | 56.2% | ▲6.3 |
| Republican | Alfred E. Fontanella | 12,193 | 40.3% | ▼9.8 |
| Tax Revolt Independent | Joseph S. Long | 547 | 1.8% | N/A |
| Independent Progressive Conservative | Roy L. Ward | 500 | 1.7% | N/A |
| Total votes | | 30,245 | '100.00%' | |

== District 36 ==
1977 general election
| Party | Candidate | Votes | % | ±% |
|---|---|---|---|---|
| Democratic | Anthony Scardino | 31,466 | 63.9% | ▲1.9 |
| Republican | Harold A. Pareti | 17,805 | 36.1% | ▼0.7 |
| Total votes | | 49,271 | 100.00% | |

== District 37 ==
1977 general election
| Party | Candidate | Votes | % | ±% |
|---|---|---|---|---|
| Democratic | Matthew Feldman (incumbent) | 31,945 | 59.0% | ▲0.4 |
| Republican | William C. Clark | 21,723 | 40.1% | ▼0.7 |
| Communist | Magnus Nelson | 492 | 0.9% | N/A |
| Total votes | | 54,160 | '100.00%' | |

== District 38 ==
1977 general election
| Party | Candidate | Votes | % | ±% |
|---|---|---|---|---|
| Democratic | John Skevin (incumbent) | 24,629 | 56.1% | ▼1.5 |
| Republican | Frank A. Buono, Jr. | 19,289 | 43.9% | ▲1.5 |
| Total votes | | 43,918 | '100.00%' | |

== District 39 ==
1977 general election
| Party | Candidate | Votes | % | ±% |
|---|---|---|---|---|
| Democratic | Frank Herbert | 28,658 | 52.8% | ▼1.5 |
| Republican | John W. Markert | 25,582 | 47.2% | ▲1.5 |
| Total votes | | 54,240 | 100.00% | |

== District 40 ==
1977 general election
| Party | Candidate | Votes | % | ±% |
|---|---|---|---|---|
| Republican | Garrett W. Hagedorn (incumbent) | 29,689 | 57.8% | ▲1.6 |
| Democratic | Anthony D. Andora | 21,009 | 40.9% | ▼2.9 |
| Independent Middle America | Victor E. Virgens | 664 | 1.3% | N/A |
| Total votes | | 51,362 | '100.00%' | |
