= John Villapiano =

American politician (born 1951)

John A. Villapiano

Monmouth County, New Jersey Board of Chosen Freeholders
- In office 1987 – September 28, 1988

Member of the New Jersey General Assembly from the 11th Legislative District
- In office September 29, 1988 – January 7, 1992 Serving with Joseph A. Palaia, Paul A. Kapalko and Daniel P. Jacobson
- Preceded by: Anthony M. Villane
- Succeeded by: Steve Corodemus and Thomas S. Smith

Personal details
- Born: November 17, 1951 (age 74) Long Branch, New Jersey, U.S.
- Party: Democratic
- Spouse: Patricia McMahon
- Children: two daughters and two sons
- Education: Bowling Green State University
- Occupation: Owner of preschool / camp

John A. Villapiano (born November 17, 1951) is an American former professional football player who played in the World Football League and a Democratic Party politician who served on the Monmouth County, New Jersey Board of Chosen Freeholders and the New Jersey General Assembly from 1988 to 1992.

== Early life and education ==
Born in Long Branch, New Jersey on November 17, 1951, Villapiano is the younger brother of Phil Villapiano, who played for 13 seasons in the NFL with the Oakland Raiders and Buffalo Bills. Raised in Ocean Township, he attended Ocean Township High School. Like his older brother, he played for the Bowling Green Falcons football team as its captain, graduating in 1974.

Villapiano played as a linebacker in the World Football League in 1974 and 1975 for the Houston Texans / Shreveport Steamer. For the 1974 season, Pro Football Weekly named Villapiano to its WFL All-League Team. In 1975, Villapiano told the Asbury Park Press that he was still owed more than $11,000 by the World Football League and hadn't been paid for his last six weeks of play, but that he stayed on the field so that he "wouldn't breach my contract."

Married to Patricia McMahon, with four children, Villapiano has been the director and co-owner of a family-owned preschool and day camp in Long Branch. Seashore Day Camp & School, was founded in 1926 and describes itself as the state's first day camp.

== Government service ==
After serving on the Ocean Township Planning Board in 1978 and 1979, Villapiano was elected to the Ocean Township Council, serving from 1979 to 1987. Villapiano was elected to the Monmouth County Board of Chosen Freeholders in 1987, where he advocated for establishment of the county's first shelter for homeless families.

Anthony M. Villane resigned from his seat representing the 11th Legislative District of the New Jersey General Assembly on July 11, 1988, after being confirmed to serve as commissioner of the New Jersey Department of Community Affairs. Villapiano defeated Villane's son Thomas in a September 15, 1988, special election to fill the vacant seat, and was sworn into office on September 28, 1988, cutting the Republican majority in the Assembly to 41–39. The special election was the last one before the passage of an amendment to the New Jersey State Constitution that allows the political party of a departing elected official to select a replacement. Villapiano and running mate Daniel P. Jacobson, a 27-year-old Township Council member in Ocean Township, were elected to full two-year terms in the Assembly in the November 1989 general election, while Republican Joseph A. Palaia defeated Democratic incumbent John D'Amico, Jr. for the seat in the New Jersey Senate. As a member of the Assembly, Villapiano served as a member of the Appropriations Committee and advocated for beach replenishment on the Jersey Shore and expansion of the state's Urban Enterprise Zone program.

As part of the Republican Party landslide in the 1991 general election as a backlash against Governor James Florio's tax increases, Villapiano and Jacobson lost their re-election bid and were replaced in the Assembly by Steve Corodemus and Thomas S. Smith. In his book How to Rig an Election: Confessions of a Republican Operative, Allen Raymond described his involvement in the 1991 race on behalf of the campaign committee of Assembly Speaker Chuck Haytaian, creating advertisements falsely implying that Villapiano had awarded himself bonuses after laying off dozens of employees at his day camp, and another piece that charged that Jacobson and Villapiano had been involved with crooked real estate deals. In the 1993 general election, Jacobson and Villapiano ran again for Assembly, losing again to Corodemus and Smith.

In March 2007, Villapiano announced that he would run as a Democrat to fill the New Jersey Senate seat being vacated by the retirement of Republican Joseph A. Palaia. In the November 2007 general election, Republican Sean T. Kean won the seat by a 28,249 to 16,314 margin.
