= James Lordi =

American politician

James P. Lordi (December 1, 1910 – June 16, 1985) was an American Democratic Party politician who served in the New Jersey General Assembly from 1970 to 1972.

Born in Newark, New Jersey, on December 1, 1910, Lordi graduated from East Side High School. He graduated from Rutgers Law School in 1934.

A lawyer and former executive secretary to Newark Mayor Ralph A. Villani, Lordi was elected to the Assembly in 1969 to represent Essex County District 11A. Running with incumbent Paul Policastro, they easily defeated the Republican candidates, Raymond Bossert and Charles J. Chirichiello. Lordi did not seek re-election to a second term in 1971 and was replaced on the ticket by Democrat Frank Megaro.

A resident of Caldwell, New Jersey, Lordi died at his home there on June 16, 1985.

== Family ==
Lordi's brother, Joseph P. Lordi, was an Essex County Prosecutor and the first chairman of the New Jersey Casino Control Commission.
