= Marie Sheehan Muhler =

American politician from New Jersey

Member of the New Jersey General Assembly
- In office January 13, 1976 – October 20, 1986 Serving with Walter J. Kozloski, John O. Bennett
- Preceded by: Morton Salkind
- Succeeded by: Clare Farragher
- Constituency: 11th District (1976–1982); 12th District (1982–1986)

Personal details
- Born: July 19, 1937 (age 89) The Bronx, New York City, New York
- Party: Republican

Marie Sheehan Muhler (born July 19, 1937) is an American Republican Party politician who served in the New Jersey General Assembly from 1976 to 1986.

Born in The Bronx, Muhler grew up in Montclair, New Jersey and graduated from Montclair High School and Marymount College (now known as Marymount University). Living in Marlboro Township, New Jersey with her husband—an engineer at Bell Laboratories—and their four children, Sheehan served on the township's zoning board of adjustment and on the boards of education of both the Marlboro Public Schools and the Freehold Regional High School District.

In her first campaign for the Assembly, running in 1975 in the 11th Legislative District, Muhler knocked off incumbent Democrat Morton Salkind by a margin of under 300 votes. In the Assembly, she served on the Education Committee and the Joint Committee on Ethical Standards, and was selected as deputy minority whip, one of the four party leadership roles selected by a vote of the assembly members of each party.

In the 1980 general election, Muhler faced off against incumbent Democrat James J. Howard with campaign visits from President Gerald R. Ford and plans to raise $200,000 and outspend the incumbent. She lost by less than one percent of the vote in the race for New Jersey's 3rd congressional district. In 1982, Muhler and Howard faced off against each other for a second time. In redistricting following the 1980 United States census, Marlboro Township was one of several strongly Republican municipalities that were removed from the district. With the changes in the political landscape, Muhler lost a second time to Howard, by a 62% to 36% margin.

Muhler resigned from the Assembly on October 20, 1986 to join the New Jersey Department of Community Affairs.

New Jersey General Assembly
Preceded by Morton Salkind	Member of the New Jersey General Assembly from the 11th district January 13, 1976–January 12, 1982; Served alongside: Walter J. Kozloski and John O. Bennett	Succeeded by Joseph A. Palaia
Preceded by Bill Flynn	Member of the New Jersey General Assembly from the 12th district January 12, 1982–October 20, 1986; Served alongside: John O. Bennett	Succeeded by Clare Farragher
