= Daniel Jacobson =

Daniel Jacobson may refer to:

- Dan Jacobson (1929–2014), South African writer
- Daniel P. Jacobson (born 1961), American politician in New Jersey
