= S. Thomas Gagliano =

American politician (1931–2019)

Member of the New Jersey Senate
- In office January 10, 1978 – May 1, 1989
- Preceded by: Alfred N. Beadleston
- Succeeded by: John O. Bennett
- Constituency: 11th district (1978–1982); 12th district (1982–1989)

Personal details
- Born: November 10, 1931 Long Branch, New Jersey, U.S.
- Died: April 13, 2019 (aged 87) Red Bank, New Jersey, U.S.
- Party: Republican
- Spouse: Jeanne M. Labrecque
- Children: 4
- Education: Brown University; Georgetown University Law School

S. Thomas Gagliano (November 10, 1931 – April 13, 2019) was an American Republican Party politician who served in the New Jersey Senate from 1978 to 1989.

== Biography ==
Gagliano was born in Long Branch in 1931. He attended Long Branch High School and the Carteret School in West Orange. He attended Brown University graduating in 1954 with a degree in English and American Literature. He then attended Georgetown University Law School earning a law degree in 1959. While in law school, he worked as an aide to Congressman James C. Auchincloss. Gagliano also served in the United States Navy Reserve from 1954 to 1956 where he attained the rank of lieutenant, junior grade.

After earning his law degree, Gagliano began working as an attorney for various Monmouth County municipalities and public agencies. After some unsuccessful runs for the New Jersey General Assembly in the 1960s, he was elected to the Oceanport borough council in 1967 serving until 1970. He also served as the Monmouth County Surrogate (probate court) from 1971 to 1976. In 1973, by now a resident of Holmdel Township, he was one of two Republican candidates for the General Assembly running in the new 11th Legislative District. He was defeated by two Democrats, Morton Salkind and Walter J. Kozloski, in a landslide election for Democrats throughout the state that year.

In 1977, following the announced retirement of State Senator Alfred N. Beadleston, Gagliano was elected to that body from the 11th district. Easily reelected in 1981 from the renumbered 12th district, he faced a close reelection campaign in 1983 narrowly defeating Alexander Lehrer 51%–49%. During the next Senate session, he was chosen by his Republican colleagues to be an assistant Minority Leader. He became the Senate Minority Leader in 1985 and 1986. Following an easy reelection victory in 1987, he sought the position of NJ Transit director in 1989. He was ultimately chosen and resigned his Senate seat in May 1989. He held that position until 1991.

Following his retirement from public offices, he was president of the Jersey Shore Partnership, an organization relating to the coastal protection of the Jersey Shore. He was married to the former Jeanne M. Labrecque and had four children. He died on April 13, 2019, in Red Bank, New Jersey at the age of 87.

New Jersey Senate
Preceded by Alfred N. Beadleston	Member of the New Jersey Senate from the 11th district January 10, 1978–January 12, 1982	Succeeded by Brian T. Kennedy
Preceded by Eugene J. Bedell	Member of the New Jersey Senate from the 12th district January 12, 1982–May 1, 1989	Succeeded by John O. Bennett
