= Policastro =

Policastro may refer to:

== Places and jurisdictions ==
Places

- Policastro Bussentino, an Italian town and hamlet of Santa Marina, Campania
- Petilia Policastro, an Italian town and municipality in the province of Crotone, Calabria

Dioceses

- The former Roman Catholic Diocese of Policastro, and its precursor Buxentum = Bussento, which had its see in the town of Policastro Bussentino, and remains a Latin Catholic titular see as Capo della Foresta
- The current Roman Catholic Diocese of Teggiano-Policastro, created in 1986 with the union of the Dioceses of Policastro and Diano-Teggiano

== People ==
- Paul Policastro (1900–1981), American politician who served in the New Jersey General Assembly
