= Joseph A. Palaia =

American politician

President pro tempore of the New Jersey Senate
- In office January 11, 1994 – January 13, 2004; Co-Presidency with Shirley Turner from January 8, 2002 until January 13, 2004
- Preceded by: John H. Ewing
- Succeeded by: Shirley Turner

Member of the New Jersey Senate from the 11th district
- In office November 20, 1989 – January 8, 2008
- Preceded by: John D'Amico Jr.
- Succeeded by: Sean T. Kean

Member of the New Jersey General Assembly from the 11th district
- In office January 12, 1982 – November 20, 1989
- Preceded by: John O. Bennett; Marie Sheehan Muhler
- Succeeded by: Paul A. Kapalko

Member of the Monmouth County Board of Chosen Freeholders
- In office 1979–1981

Mayor of Ocean Township
- In office 1971–1979

Member of the Ocean Township Council
- In office 1967–1971

Personal details
- Born: February 3, 1927 Neptune Township, New Jersey, U.S.
- Died: August 20, 2016 (aged 89)
- Resting place: Monmouth Memorial Park, Tinton Falls, New Jersey, US
- Party: Republican
- Spouse(s): Wedell Simon (m. 1956–?, her death)
- Children: 2
- Education: Neptune High School
- Alma mater: Rider College (B.S.); Rutgers University (M.Ed.)

Joseph A. "Joe" Palaia Sr. (February 3, 1927 – August 20, 2016) was an American politician. He served in the New Jersey General Assembly from 1981 to 1989 and in the State Senate from 1989 to 2008, representing the 11th Legislative District.

== Early life ==
Palaia was born and raised in Neptune, New Jersey and was a graduate of Neptune High School. He attended New Jersey's Rider College where he received a B.S. degree in Business Administration in 1949. He then went to study at Rutgers University and was awarded an M.Ed. in Administration and Supervision. Before entering politics, Palaia was an educator, and principal of the Wanamassa Elementary School in Ocean Township (Monmouth County) where he resided.

== Political career ==
Prior to entering the State Legislature, Palaia served in a variety of state and local elected offices. He was a member of the Ocean Township Council from 1967 to 1971 until he became mayor in 1971. During his tenure as mayor, the Seaview Square Mall was built and the oversaw the township's conversion of the Deal Test Site into a park which was renamed for him in 1998. Palaia served as Ocean Township's mayor until 1979. He then served on the Monmouth County Board of Chosen Freeholders from 1979 to 1981.

In 1981, Palaia was elected to the New Jersey General Assembly, the lower house of the New Jersey Legislature, where he served until 1989. In 1984, he served as the Assembly's Assistant Minority Whip. He chaired the Assembly Education Committee during the one term Republicans controlled the Assembly from 1986 to 1988. He created bills signed into law that would allow for the state takeover of failing school districts and the requirement that 11th grade high school students pass a standardized test (High School Proficiency Assessment) to graduate high school.

He was elected to the State Senate in 1989, defeating the appointed incumbent Democrat John D'Amico, Jr. After taking the office on November 20, he served in a variety of leadership roles. From 1992 to 1993, Palaia was the Assistant Majority Leader and from 1994 to 2003 he was President Pro Tempore of the Senate. In 2002-2003 he was the Republican President Pro Tempore when the Senate was evenly split 20-20. Palaia was a member of the Senate Education Committee. He was one of the sponsors of the New Jersey Childproof Handgun Law that passed in 2002.

== Personal life ==
Palaia was married to the former Wedell Simon from 1956 until her death. Together, they had two children: son Joseph Jr. (1959 – 2016), and daughter Denise who has followed her father into education and is principal of Wayside Elementary School. Palaia died on August 20, 2016.

New Jersey General Assembly
| Preceded by John O. Bennett; Marie Sheehan Muhler | Member of the New Jersey General Assembly from the 11th district January 12, 1982–November 20, 1989; Served alongside: Anthony M. Villane, John Villapiano | Succeeded by Paul A. Kapalko |
New Jersey Senate
| Preceded by John D'Amico, Jr. | Member of the New Jersey Senate from the 11th district November 20, 1989–January 8, 2008 | Succeeded by Sean T. Kean |
