= Biancardi =

Biancardi is an Italian surname. Notable people with the surname include:

- Joseph Biancardi (1906–1984), American Democratic Party politician and labor leader
- Paul Biancardi (born 1962), American recruiting director, basketball analyst and former college basketball coach.

== See also ==
- Bracardi
