= Patrick Dodd =

Patrick or Pat Dodd may refer to:

- Patrick Dodd, a singer on The Voice (U.S. season 4)
- Patrick Dodd, an editor on Smooth Talk
- Pat Dodd, American businessman and politician
