= Sean T. Kean =

Member of the New Jersey General Assembly

Member of the New Jersey General Assembly
- Incumbent
- Assumed office January 10, 2012 Serving with Dave Rible; Ned Thomson
- Preceded by: Ronald S. Dancer; Joseph R. Malone
- Constituency: 30th district
- In office October 28, 2002 – January 8, 2008 Serving with Steve Corodemus
- Preceded by: Thomas S. Smith
- Succeeded by: Mary Pat Angelini; Dave Rible
- Constituency: 11th district

Member of the New Jersey Senate from the 11th district
- In office January 8, 2008 – January 10, 2012
- Preceded by: Joseph A. Palaia
- Succeeded by: Jennifer Beck

Personal details
- Born: Sean Thomas Kean; May 21, 1963 (age 63) Montclair, New Jersey, U.S.
- Party: Republican
- Spouse: Bridget
- Children: Sean Jr., Terrence & Mary
- Education: Seton Hall University (BA, JD); Columbia University (MALS)
- Occupation: Attorney
- Website: Legislative webpage

Sean T. Kean (born May 21, 1963) is an American Republican Party politician, who has represented the 30th legislative district in the New Jersey General Assembly since being sworn into office on January 10, 2012. Prior to redistricting, Kean served in the New Jersey Senate from 2008 to 2012, representing the 11th legislative district. He had previously represented the 11th district in the General Assembly from 2002 to 2008.

== Biography ==
Kean was born in Montclair, grew up in Deal and attended Red Bank Catholic High School. He is of Irish heritage and has family ancestry in County Cork.

Kean received a B.A. in 1988 from Seton Hall University in Political Science, was granted an M.A.L.S. in 1992 from Columbia University in American Studies and was awarded a J.D. from the Seton Hall University School of Law in 1995. Before becoming an attorney, Kean was a member of the Heavy and General Construction Laborers Local 472 Union (a branch of the Laborers' International Union of North America) in Newark from 1984 until 1988. Kean served as an aide to State Senator John O. Bennett from 1994 through 1996. He served on the Monmouth County Environmental Council from 1999 to 2001 and on the Wall Township Planning Board from 2001 to 2002. Prior to 1994, Kean had been registered a Democrat.

Kean is a resident of Wall Township where he lives with his wife Bridget and triplets born in July 2012. Kean formerly wrote a column titled "Legislative Matters" in The Coast Star, a weekly local newspaper in Monmouth County. His column typically contains news from the statehouse in Trenton, opinions on issues facing his district, and criticism of the state's Democratic Party.

== Legislative career ==
Kean first took his seat in the Assembly on October 28, 2002, following his selection by the District 11 Republican County Committee members to fill the vacancy created by the death of Assemblyman Thomas S. Smith. Despite not having the endorsement of Monmouth County Republican Chair William F. Dowd and the district's other Assemblyman Steve Corodemus, Kean won the special convention vote winning a majority of the vote (113 votes) on the first ballot defeating Long Branch councilman Anthony Giordano (81 votes) and former Asbury Park mayor Carl Williams (13 votes). He would win election to full two-year terms in 2003 and 2005.

In the Assembly, he was the Assistant Republican Whip from 2004 to 2008. In his first stint in the Assembly, Kean served in the State Government Committee and the Transportation and Public Works Committee.

In 2007, 11th District Senator Joseph A. Palaia opted to retire at the end of his term. Kean sought election to the seat and defeated former professional football player and Assemblyman John Villapiano 63%-37%. During the first two years of his four-year Senate term, he served on the Legislative Services Commission, Labor, and Transportation Committees. In the next two years, he was a member of the Health, Human Services and Senior Citizens Committee and the Transportation Committee.

As a result of the 2011 legislative redistricting, Kean's hometown of Wall Township was placed into the 30th Legislative District setting up a potential primary election with fellow Republican Senator Robert Singer. Kean avoided such a fight by instead successfully running for election to the Assembly alongside David Rible (who was one of Kean's Assembly successors). In his current term in the Assembly, he is on the Consumer Affairs and Regulated Professions Committees.

=== Committees ===
Committee assignments for the 2024—2025 Legislative Session are:

- Consumer Affairs
- Regulated Professions

=== District 30 ===
Each of the 40 districts in the New Jersey Legislature has one representative in the New Jersey Senate and two members in the New Jersey General Assembly. The representatives from the 30th District for the 2024—2025 Legislative Session are:

- Senator Robert Singer (R)
- Assemblyman Sean T. Kean (R)
- Assemblyman Avi Schnall (D)

== Election history ==
30th Legislative District General Election, 2023
Party	Candidate	Votes	%
Republican	Sean T. Kean (incumbent)	37,450	39.9
Democratic	Avi Schnall	29,482	31.4
Republican	Edward H. Thomson (incumbent)	18,076	19.3
Democratic	Salvatore Frascino	8,868	9.4
Total votes		93,876	100.0
Republican hold			
Democratic gain from Republican			

2021 New Jersey general election
Party	Candidate	Votes	%	±%
Republican	Sean T. Kean	54,541	36.8	▲0.5
Republican	Edward H. Thomson	52,678	35.5	▲1.7
Democratic	Stephen Dobbins	20,800	14.0	▼0.4
Democratic	Matthew Filosa	20,366	13.7	▼0.1
Total votes		148,385	100.0	

2019 New Jersey general election
Party	Candidate	Votes	%	±%
Republican	Sean T. Kean	25,426	36.3	▲3.0
Republican	Edward H. Thomson	23,662	33.8	▲3.5
Democratic	Steven Farkas	10,063	14.4	▼4.1
Democratic	Yasin “Jason” Celik	9,666	13.8	▼4.1
The Other Candidate	Hank Schroeder	1,213	1.7	N/A
Total votes		70,030	100.0	

New Jersey general election, 2017
Party	Candidate	Votes	%	±%
Republican	Sean T. Kean	33,672	33.3	▼1.2
Republican	Edward H. Thomson III	30,680	30.3	▼3.6
Democratic	Kevin Scott	18,737	18.5	▲2.6
Democratic	Eliot Arlo Colon	18,160	17.9	▲4.2
Total votes		101,249	100.0	

New Jersey general election, 2015
Party	Candidate	Votes	%	±%
Republican	Sean T. Kean	19,826	34.5	▼3.7
Republican	David P. Rible	19,459	33.9	▼2.0
Democratic	Jim Keady	9,148	15.9	▲2.5
Democratic	Lorna Phillipson	7,867	13.7	▲1.2
Economic Growth	Hank Schroeder	1,101	1.9	N/A
Total votes		57,401	100.0	

New Jersey general election, 2013
Party	Candidate	Votes	%	±%
Republican	Sean T. Kean	39,702	38.2	▲3.8
Republican	David P. Rible	37,252	35.9	▲4.7
Democratic	Jimmy Esposito	13,898	13.4	▼3.5
Democratic	Lorelei Rouvrais	12,967	12.5	▼3.5
Total votes		103,819	100.0	

New Jersey general election, 2011
Party	Candidate	Votes	%
Republican	Sean T. Kean	22,889	34.4
Republican	David P. Rible	20,728	31.2
Democratic	Shaun O'Rourke	11,256	16.9
Democratic	Howard Kleinhendler	10,639	16.0
Libertarian	David Schneck	986	1.5
Total votes		66,498	100.0

New Jersey Senate
Preceded by Joseph A. Palaia	Member of the New Jersey Senate for the 11th District; January 8, 2008 – January 10, 2012	Succeeded by Jennifer Beck
New Jersey General Assembly
Preceded by Ronald S. Dancer; Joseph R. Malone	Member of the New Jersey General Assembly for the 30th District; January 10, 2012 – present With: David Rible, Ned Thomson	Succeeded by Incumbent
Preceded by Thomas S. Smith	Member of the New Jersey General Assembly for the 11th District; October 28, 2002 – January 8, 2008; With: Steve Corodemus	Succeeded by Mary Pat Angelini; David Rible
