= Joseph P. Lordi =

American lawyer (1919-1983)

1st Chairman of the New Jersey Casino Control Commission
- In office September 6, 1977–1981
- Succeeded by: Martin B. Danziger (acting)

Essex County Prosecutor
- In office 1968–1977

Director of the New Jersey Division of Alcoholic Beverage Control
- In office 1964–1968

Personal details
- Born: June 28, 1919
- Died: October 21, 1983 (aged 64) Spring Lake Heights, New Jersey, US
- Party: Democratic
- Spouse: Mary
- Relations: James Lordi (brother)
- Children: Linda Lordi Cavanaugh
- Education: East Side High School; Rutgers University–Newark; Rutgers Law School
- Website: New Jersey Casino Control Commission-Archived page

Joseph P. Lordi (June 28, 1919 – October 21, 1983) was an American law enforcement official who served as the Essex County, New Jersey prosecutor and as the first Chairman of the New Jersey Casino Control Commission.

Lordi was a counterespionage agent for the Office of Strategic Services in Europe during World War II.

== Early life and education ==
Raised in Newark, New Jersey, Lordi graduated from East Side High School, Rutgers University–Newark and Rutgers Law School.

== Legal career ==
Lordi served as Deputy Attorney General of New Jersey under Gov. Robert Meyner and was an Assistant Essex County Prosecutor from 1959 to 1964. Gov. Richard J. Hughes named him as Director of the New Jersey Alcoholic Beverage Commission, and in 1968 as the Essex County Prosecutor, replacing Brendan Byrne. He spent nine years in that post, where he grew in prominence for his prosecution of organized crime figures and corrupt public officials. Byrne named him as the first New Jersey Casino Control Commission Chairman, and he was sworn in on September 6, 1977. He served until 1981.

== Personal life ==
Lordi died at the age of 64 on October 21, 1983, at his home in Spring Lake Heights, New Jersey.

Lordi's brother, James Lordi, served in the New Jersey General Assembly. His daughter, Linda Lordi Cavanaugh, served on the Essex County Board of Chosen Freeholders.

Government offices
Preceded by None	Chair of the New Jersey Casino Control Commission; 1977–1981	Succeeded by Martin B. Danziger (acting)
