= Bracardi =

Bracardi is an Italian surname. Notable people with the surname include:

- Franco Bracardi (1937–2005), Italian actor, composer, pianist and stand-up comedian.
- Giorgio Bracardi (1933–2026), Italian actor, composer and stand-up comedian.

== See also ==
- Bacardi
- Biancardi
- Bracari
