= Gregory J. Castano =

American journalist (born 1929)

Gregory Joseph Castano (born February 17, 1929) is an American Democratic Party politician and lawyer. He is the son of the late Mr. and Mrs. Nicholas Castano. He is a graduate of Seton Hall University and Fordham University School of Law and received a master's degree in Taxation Law from New York University. He was admitted to the New Jersey Bar in 1956. He is a partner in the law firm of Castano Quigley LLC in Fairfield, New Jersey.

Castano served as an Assistant Hudson County Prosecutor and as the Harrison tax assessor. He served as the Town Attorney for Kearny and West New York, and as the attorney for the Harrison Redevelopment Authority. He was also a sports writer for The Star-Ledger and worked for The New York Times, the Associated Press, the Newark Evening News and The Philadelphia Inquirer. He served on the editorial board for The Advocate, the newspaper of the Newark Archdiocese.

He also worked as a bylined sport writer for The Star-Ledger and as an area correspondent for The New York Times, Associated Press, Newark Evening News and The Philadelphia Inquirer. He has been a member of Notre Dame Church Parish Council in North Caldwell, chairman of the grammar school basketball program, coach of the town youth basketball program, a member of the Municipal Juvenile Conference Committee and a member of the editorial board of The Advocate, The Newark Archdiocese newspaper.

Castano ran for the New Jersey Senate in 1973, in a newly drawn legislative district that included parts of Essex (Newark/North Ward) and Hudson (Harrison and Kearny). With the support of the Hudson County Democratic Organization, he defeated Belleville Commissioner Mary V. Senatore, who was endorsed by the Essex County Democratic Committee, in the primary by a vote of 9,231 (56%) to 7,859 (44%). Castano lost the General Election to Assemblyman Anthony Imperiale, an Assemblyman running as an Independent. Imperiale received 24,756 votes (49%), with 18,286 votes (36%) for Castano and 7,131 votes (14%) for the Republican, former Assemblyman C. Richard Fiore.

Governor Brendan T. Byrne appointed Castano to serve as a New Jersey Superior Court Judge.
