= 1970 Newark mayoral election =

- June 16, 1970
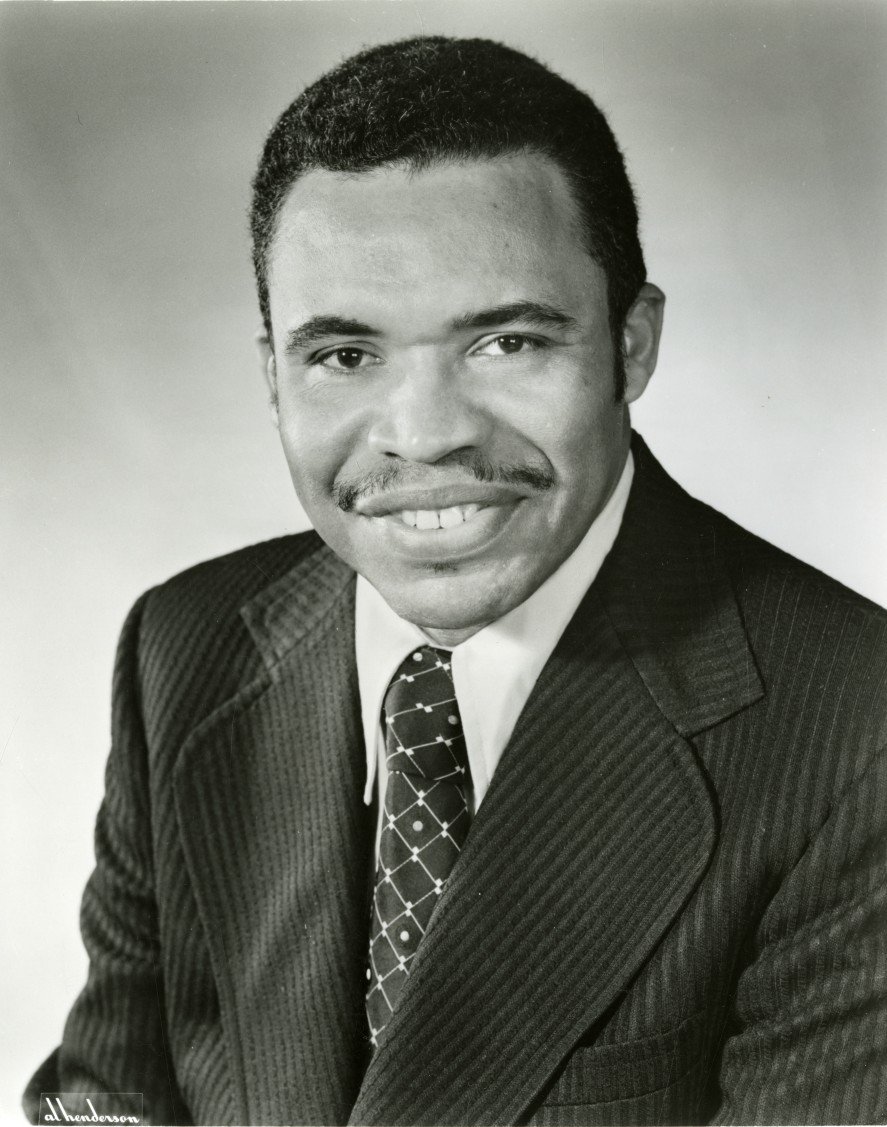

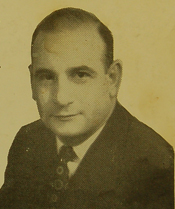
Candidate	Kenneth A. Gibson	Hugh Addonizio
Party	Nonpartisan	Nonpartisan
Popular vote	54,892	43,339
Percentage	55.88%	44.12%
Mayor before election
Hugh Addonizio
Democratic
Elected mayor
Kenneth A. Gibson
Democratic

The 1970 Newark mayoral election was held on June 16, 1970. Incumbent mayor Hugh Addonizio ran for a third term in office but was defeated by civil engineer Kenneth A. Gibson. Gibson became the first black man elected mayor of a major city in the Northeastern United States or Eastern Seaboard.

Gibson finished first in a primary election on May 12 but did not receive a majority of the vote. He defeated Addonizio in the run-off with 55.88% of the vote and record turnout.

Gibson would remain in office until 1986; he ran two unsuccessful campaigns for Governor of New Jersey in 1981 and 1985.

== Background ==
=== Race ===
By 1970, Newark was one of the United States' first majority-black cities. However, city government, the police department, and political representation at the state and federal level were still overwhelmingly white, possibly due in part to the black population skewing below the voting age.

=== 1967 riots ===
In the summer of 1967, Newark was the site of race riots, one of 159 throughout the country that summer. Beginning with the arrest, beating, and jailing of a black taxicab driver by two white police officers, the city descended into violent chaos for six days. From July 12 to 17, violence in the city left a total of 16 civilian bystanders, 8 criminal suspects, a police officer, and a firefighter dead; 353 civilians, 214 suspects, 67 police officers, 55 firefighters, and 38 military personnel injured; and 689 civilians and 811 suspects arrested. Property damage is estimated to have exceeded $10 million ($148,765,859 in 2025).

=== Addonizio corruption investigation ===
In December 1969, stemming from federal investigations into the cause and handling of the riots, Mayor Addonizio and nine current or former municipal officials were indicted by a federal grand jury on charges of extortion and tax evasion. Five other persons were also indicted, including reputed mafioso Anthony Boiardo.

== Primary election ==
=== Candidates ===
- Hugh Addonizio, incumbent Mayor since 1962
- John P. Caufield, former Newark Fire Director (1962–70)
- Kenneth A. Gibson, civil engineer and candidate for mayor in 1966
- Anthony Imperiale, City Councilman and vigilante leader during 1967 riots
- Alexander Matturri, State Senator
- George C. Richardson, former State Assemblyman
- Harry Wheeler

=== Endorsements ===
Alexander Matturri

Individuals

- Leo P. Carlin, former Mayor (1953–62) and candidate for Mayor in 1962 and 1966

=== Results ===
1970 Newark mayoral election
Party	Candidate	Votes	%
Nonpartisan	Kenneth A. Gibson	37,666	42.72%
Nonpartisan	Hugh Addonizio (incumbent)	17,925	20.33%
Nonpartisan	Anthony Imperiale	13,904	15.77%
Nonpartisan	John P. Caufield	11,752	13.33%
Nonpartisan	Alexander Matturri	4,752	5.39%
Nonpartisan	George C. Richardson	2,024	2.30%
Nonpartisan	Harry Wheeler	140	0.16%
Total votes		88,173	100.00%

== Runoff ==
=== Endorsements ===
Kenneth Gibson

Individuals

- John P. Caufield, former Newark Fire Director and candidate in primary

=== Results ===
1970 Newark mayoral runoff
Party	Candidate	Votes	%
Nonpartisan	Kenneth A. Gibson	54,892	55.88%
Nonpartisan	Hugh Addonizio (incumbent)	43,339	44.12%
Total votes		98,231	100.00%

== Aftermath ==
=== Addonizio ===
Addonizio was convicted of conspiracy and 63 counts of extortion in July and sentenced to ten years in federal prison in September.

=== Caufield ===
John Caufield was elected to the New Jersey Senate as a Democrat in 1978 and served until his death in 1986.

=== Gibson ===
Gibson went on to serve four terms as mayor until he was defeated for re-election by Sharpe James in 1986. While mayor, he ran twice for Governor of New Jersey in 1981 and 1985, but failed to win the Democratic nomination. He returned to politics in 1998, when he narrowly lost a race for Essex County Executive to Republican James Treffinger. In 2002, he pleaded guilty to tax evasion.

=== Imperiale ===
Imperiale represented the East Ward as an independent member of the state legislature from 1972 to 1978. He challenged Gibson unsuccessfully in the 1974 mayoral election. He served one more term in the Assembly as a Republican from 1980 to 1982 but left office to run for governor in the 1981 election. He finished sixth in the Republican primary.
