= Anthony Imperiale =

American politician (1931–1999)

Member of the New Jersey Senate from the 30th district
- In office January 8, 1974 – January 10, 1978
- Preceded by: District created
- Succeeded by: Frank E. Rodgers

Member of the New Jersey General Assembly
- In office January 11, 1972 – January 8, 1974 Serving with Frank Megaro
- Preceded by: Ronald Owens; George C. Richardson
- Succeeded by: District eliminated
- Constituency: District 11-B
- In office January 8, 1980 – January 12, 1982 Serving with Michael F. Adubato
- Preceded by: John F. Cali
- Succeeded by: John V. Kelly; Buddy Fortunato
- Constituency: 30th district

Personal details
- Born: April 10, 1931 Newark, New Jersey, U.S.
- Died: December 27, 1999 (aged 68) Livingston, New Jersey, U.S.
- Party: Independent (1970–79); Republican (after 1979)
- Children: 7

Military service
- Allegiance: United States
- Branch/service: United States Marine Corps
- Battles/wars: Korean War

Anthony Michael Imperiale Sr. (July 10, 1931 – December 27, 1999) was an American paramedic, activist, vigilante and militant leader, and populist politician from Newark, New Jersey who represented the city's North Ward on the Municipal Council of Newark from 1968 to 1974 and represented the city in the New Jersey Legislature between 1972 and 1982. He was a controversial and polarizing figure who became a symbol of white ethnic backlash to the civil rights movement and civil disorder of the 1960s. He unsuccessfully sought to become mayor of Newark in 1970 and 1974 and governor of New Jersey in 1977 and 1981.

During the 1967 Newark riots, Imperiale led armed citizen groups in the city's North Ward; he was accused of vigilantism by critics, including Governor Richard J. Hughes. In 1968, he was elected to the Municipal Council of Newark. He ran unsuccessfully for mayor in 1970 and 1974, when he was the runner-up to incumbent Kenneth A. Gibson. While on the council, he opposed Gibson and was highly critical of the black nationalist movement in the city led by Amiri Baraka, successfully blocking Kawaida Towers, a controversial high-rise project sponsored by Baraka.

Running as an independent, Imperiale was elected to represent the 30th district in the New Jersey General Assembly in 1971 and New Jersey Senate in 1973. In 1977, he ran against incumbent governor Brendan Byrne but withdrew from the race. He was elected to a second term in the General Assembly in 1979 and joined the Republican Party. After running unsuccessfully for the Republican nomination for governor in 1981, he never held office again, though he made several unsuccessful bids for federal, state, and local offices.

== Early life ==
Anthony Michael Imperiale Sr. was born on July 10, 1931, in Newark, New Jersey, where he attended, but never graduated from, Barringer High School. He later served in the United States Marine Corps during the Korean War. In the 1960s, his first foray into local politics was when he opposed forced race-integration busing in Newark.

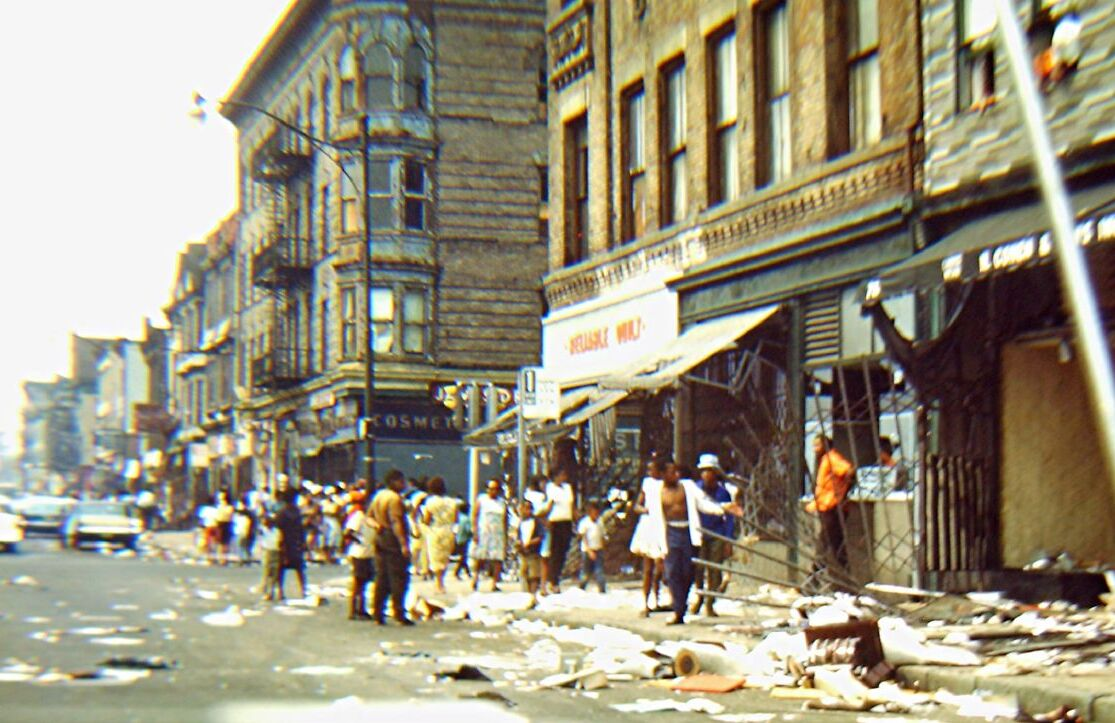
The aftermath of the 1967 Newark riots, which resulted in at least 26 deaths and hundreds of serious injuries.

=== 1967 Newark riots ===
During the 1967 Newark riots, Imperiale advocated armed white self-defense and formed the volunteer North Ward First Aid Squad, ostensibly to escort North Ward residents, most of whom were Italian-American, through racially troubled neighborhoods. Imperiale likened Newark during the riots to "a town of the old West" and said, "The good guys are prepared to shoot to kill to keep the peace, if Negroes come to burn our homes."

The group was accused of vigilantism, and Governor Richard J. Hughes called Imperiale's followers "brownshirts". At one point during the riots, Imperiale warned that "when the Black Panther comes, the white hunter will be waiting." At the end of the riots, Imperiale negotiated with Imamu Baraka to bring violence in the city to an end; however, neither sought permanent reconciliation.

In 1969, the group disbanded.

== Political career ==
=== Newark city council ===
In November 1968, following his involvement in the riots, Imperiale gained national attention by winning a seat on the Municipal Council of Newark. His victory was taken as emblematic of white ethnic backlash against the riots and the civil rights movement. He represented the city at-large, but his political base was the North Ward, an economically diverse region of the city bordering the Passaic River and home to a large white population of mostly Italian American residents, along with substantial African American, Irish American, and Puerto Rican minorities. In 1968, Imperiale supported the presidential campaign of George Wallace, the former segregationist governor of Alabama; although Wallace was expected to carry 15 to 20 percent of the vote in Newark, he finished with under 10 percent. Hubert Humphrey carried the North Ward with a plurality of the vote.

As a councilor, Imperiale continued to receive criticism from members of the city's moderate establishment. In 1972, Imperiale critic and mayoral aide Don Malafronte said, "Many whites want peace, and Imperiale means trouble."

=== 1970 mayoral campaign ===
In 1970, Imperiale ran for mayor against the incumbent, Hugh J. Addonizio. He finished third behind Addonizio and Kenneth A. Gibson with 15 percent of the vote, with the majority coming from the North Ward. Despite much of Imperiale's support going to Addonizio in the run-off election, Gibson would win to become the first black mayor in Newark history and in any major city in the northeastern United States. Shortly after Gibson's election, the 1970 census showed that Newark had become the second black-majority city in the United States.

Despite his defeat, Imperiale ran well ahead of the field in the North Ward. He parlayed this success into an attempt to supplant Steve Adubato Sr., the ward's Democratic Party chair. However, the effort failed, possibly because Imperiale was known to be a Republican and because Adubato was able to hold together a coalition of Italian Americans and middle-class African Americans.

=== State assemblyman (1972–74) ===
Imperiale was elected to the New Jersey General Assembly in 1971. Running as an independent on a "For the People" ticket, Imperiale received more votes than any candidate for public office in the district, including candidates for United States Senator. As of 2018, Imperiale was the only independent politician to win election to the New Jersey legislature since 1968.

Because the 1971 elections gave the Democratic Party a slim 40-39 advantage in the General Assembly, Imperiale's victory threatened to deadlock the chamber. As a result, Imperiale's role as an independent was crucial to the legislative organization of the Assembly and passage of any legislation in the upcoming session. On November 4, however, Governor William T. Cahill pledged to block any efforts to invite Imperiale to vote with the Republican Party. On November 5, George C. Richardson of Newark said he would walk out rather than vote for a Democratic majority that included Imperiale, which he believed would be "an insult to every white or black who believes in racial conciliation." Other black Democratic assemblymembers, S. Howard Woodson and Ronald Owens, welcomed Imperiale's support.

On his arrival in the Assembly in 1972, Imperiale declined to join either major party. He went so far as to plant his seat in the aisle separating the two parties and refused to move out of the way.

==== Kawaida Towers protest ====
As a state legislator, Imperiale continued to focus on local issues. He joined with George C. Richardson in December 1971 to set aside political differences and address a city Chamber of Commerce luncheon, stressing their shared opposition to black nationalism and the need to rebuild the city. In late 1972, he led the opposition to the construction of Kawaida Towers, a planned low- and middle-income high-rise public housing project in the North Ward, organizing against Imamu Amiri Baraka, the city's leading black nationalist and sponsor of the project, which he referred to as "the temple Kawaida." Opponents of the project denied their opposition was racially motivated and emphasized the single-family homes and small apartment buildings which dominated the character of the neighborhood; councilman Anthony Guiliano cited high rises as "breed[ing] slums" and "crime". Imperiale publicly called for a meeting with Baraka and expressed willingness to support a five-story building or "garden apartments."

During the protests, Imperiale vowed to chain himself to the entrance to the construction site and criticized Baraka (whom he referred to by his birth name, LeRoi Jones) for favoring segregation in Dallas, the Archbishop of Newark for attending a Baraka speech, and Channel 2 News for unfavorable coverage of demonstrators. Construction stopped when workers refused to cross Imperiale's picket line. By the end of the protests, The New York Times reported that Imperiale was considered the leading white political figure in the city and a probable mayoral contender in 1974. The Kawaida Towers project was eventually abandoned in 1976.

=== State senator (1974–78), 1974 mayoral campaign ===
==== 1973 Senate election ====
In 1973, although he was expected to win easily by pulling votes from both Republican and Democratic voters Imperiale chose not to run for re-election and instead ran as an independent for the New Jersey Senate, seeking an open seat in the newly created 30th district, which included the North Ward as well as Newark's East Ward and the towns of Belleville, East Newark, Harrison, Kearny, and Secaucus. The district featured a predominantly white ethnic population and the campaign was dominated by concerns regarding crime. Imperiale declared his campaign an instrument through which "the working people of all races can get real representation in Trenton."

In the election, Imperiale faced Gregory J. Castano, a former assistant Hudson County prosecutor, and C. Richard Fiore, whom he had unseated in the 1971 Assembly election. Though both opponents expected Imperiale to perform as a spoiler candidate, Imperiale argued that his personal identity was stronger than traditional political allegiances. Both opponents challenged him for absenteeism in the Assembly and his allegedly extremist views. Fiore said that Newark would be better off if "they put Imperiale and LeRoi Jones in the same bus and ship[ped] them out of town." Maintaining a populist stance, Imperiale countered that his local activism against Kawaida was more important than attendance in the Assembly and that while he had been on "the firing line," both Castano and Fiore had been "back in their living rooms watching the battle over Kawaida on their television sets." He said that he sought the Senate seat in order to exercise leverage over the appointment of judges.

During his senate campaign, Imperiale emphasized populist and patriotic themes, claiming that in 1971, "you and I made history when we beat the well-oiled, well-financed political machines" who had "lined their pockets and sold you out to the troublemakers." He argued that the political machines were "antireligion, antiflag, Antichrist." He aligned himself with the gubernatorial campaign of Charles W. Sandman Jr., a conservative Republican.

Imperiale received 24,756 votes (49%), Castano received 18,286 votes (36%), and Fiore received 7,131 votes (14%).

In 1975, Imperiale was ranked as the most conservative member of the New Jersey legislature by the organization Americans for Democratic Action. He received 7 percent on the ADA survey, having only voted in favor of one ADA-supported measure, a bill strengthening the state Public Employment Relations Commission.

==== 1974 mayoral campaign ====
In 1974, Imperiale ran against incumbent Kenneth Gibson, but lost with 43.7% of the vote.

=== 1977 gubernatorial campaign ===
Following his second failed mayoral bid, Imperiale briefly ran for governor of New Jersey in 1977 before dropping out of the race. He was defeated for re-election to the state senate in 1977 by Frank E. Rodgers, the mayor of Harrison. He was again elected to the State Assembly in 1979, this time as a Republican. He defeated three-term Democratic Assemblyman John F. Cali.

=== 1981 gubernatorial campaign ===
He gave up his Assembly seat in 1981 to seek the Republican nomination for Governor of New Jersey, finishing 6th in a field of 8 candidates with 5% of the vote.

Later, Imperiale made unsuccessful bids for Essex County Freeholder, Essex County Sheriff, and U.S. Representative.

== Electoral history ==
1971 Assembly District 11-B
Party	Candidate	Votes	%
Independent	Anthony Imperiale	13,857	23.59%
Democratic	Frank Megaro	12,436	21.17%
Democratic	Paul Policastro (incumbent)	10,825	18.43%
Republican	C. Richard Fiore (incumbent)	8,215	13.99%
Republican	Ralph D'Ambola	7,351	12.52%
Independent	Ronald J. DelMauro	3,323	5.66%
Independent	Nicholas A. Ciufi III	2,729	4.65%
Total votes		58,736	100.00%

1981 Republican gubernatorial primary
Party	Candidate	Votes	%
Republican	Thomas Kean	122,512	30.75
Republican	Lawrence Francis Kramer	83,565	20.98
Republican	Bo Sullivan	67,651	16.98
Republican	James Wallwork	61,816	15.52
Republican	Barry T. Parker	26,040	6.54
Republican	Anthony Imperiale	18,452	4.63
Republican	John K. Rafferty	12,837	3.22
Republican	Richard McGlynn	5,486	1.38
Total votes		398,359	100.00

== Personal life and death ==
After leaving office, Imperiale founded a volunteer ambulance company in Newark. As a volunteer paramedic, he was praised by his former political rivals and for his generosity, sense of humor, and commitment to equal treatment.

In 1984, Imperiale's son Anthony Jr. was sentenced to nine years in prison for shooting and wounding a minor who was making noise outside his bedroom window. In 1987, Imperiale's son Michael was shot and wounded by an off-duty police officer after the two got in a car accident.

He died on December 26, 1999, at Saint Barnabas Medical Center in Livingston, New Jersey of complications related to kidney failure.

== Popular culture ==
Imperiale is referenced in season 4, episode 7 of The Sopranos

New Jersey General Assembly
Preceded by Ronald Owens; George C. Richardson	Member of the New Jersey General Assembly from the 11-B district January 11, 1972–January 8, 1974; Served alongside: Frank Megaro	Succeeded by Constituency abolished
Preceded by John F. Cali	Member of the New Jersey General Assembly from the 30th district January 8, 1980–January 12, 1982; Served alongside: Michael F. Adubato	Succeeded by John V. Kelly; Buddy Fortunato
New Jersey Senate
Preceded by Constituency established	Member of the New Jersey Senate from the 30th district January 8, 1974–January 10, 1978	Succeeded by Frank E. Rodgers
