= Steve Corodemus =

American Republican Party politician

Member of the New Jersey General Assembly from the 11th district
- In office January 7, 1992 – January 8, 2008 Serving with Thomas S. Smith; Sean T. Kean
- Preceded by: Daniel P. Jacobson and John Villapiano
- Succeeded by: Mary Pat Angelini and Dave Rible

Personal details
- Born: January 14, 1952 (age 74) Newark, New Jersey, U.S.
- Party: Republican
- Spouse: Michelle
- Children: one daughter and one son
- Education: Rutgers University (BA); Seton Hall University (JD)
- Occupation: Attorney

Steve Corodemus (born January 14, 1952) is an American Republican Party politician, who served in the New Jersey General Assembly from 1992 to 2008, where he represented the 11th Legislative District.

== Early life and education ==
Born in Newark, New Jersey, Corodemus was raised in Old Bridge Township, New Jersey, graduating from Madison Township High School in 1970.

Corodemus received a B.A. from Rutgers University in History in 1974 and was awarded a J.D. from the Seton Hall University School of Law in 1979.

== Elected office ==
He was the Deputy Republican Leader and Policy Chair from 2004 until he left the Assembly. He served as the Majority Whip from 1994 to 1995, and was the Assistant Majority Whip from 1992 to 1993. Corodemus served in the Assembly on the Health and Senior Services Committee and the Joint Legislative Committee on Ethical Standards.

Corodemus served on the Monmouth County Planning Board from 1986 to 1992, serving as its Vice Chair from 1989 to 1992. He was a member of the Atlantic Highlands Borough Council from 1986 to 1988 and served as its president in 1988. Corodemus served as the attorney for the Atlantic Highlands Rent Control Board and Board of Adjustment.

== Personal life ==
Corodemus is currently married to his wife, Michele, and they have two children: a daughter, Katelynn and a son, Dimitrios. He resides in Atlantic Highlands.
