= Dave Rible =

American politician

David P. Rible

Director of the New Jersey Division of Alcoholic Beverage Control
- Incumbent
- Assumed office July 17, 2017
- Preceded by: Jonathan Orsen (acting)

Member of the New Jersey General Assembly from the 30th District
- In office January 10, 2012 – July 17, 2017 Serving with Sean T. Kean
- Preceded by: Ronald S. Dancer; Joseph R. Malone
- Succeeded by: Ned Thomson

Member of the New Jersey General Assembly from the 11th District
- In office January 8, 2008 – January 10, 2012 Serving with Mary Pat Angelini
- Preceded by: Steve Corodemus; Sean T. Kean
- Succeeded by: Caroline Casagrande

Personal details
- Born: August 28, 1967 (age 59) Belmar, New Jersey, U.S.
- Party: Republican
- Spouse: Jacqueline Rible
- Children: one
- Education: Brookdale Community College; Seton Hall University
- Website: Legislative website

David P. Rible (born August 28, 1967) is an American Republican Party politician, who has served as Director of the New Jersey Division of Alcoholic Beverage Control since July 2017. He had previously served in the New Jersey General Assembly representing the 30th Legislative District from January 10, 2012 until July 17, 2017, when he was appointed as Director of the ABC. Prior to redistricting, he represented the 11th Legislative District in the Assembly from January 8, 2008 to 2012.

== Biography ==
Rible was born and raised in Belmar. He attended Asbury Park High School, Brookdale Community College majoring in criminal justice, and Seton Hall University, also majoring in criminal justice. After his college career, he attended the New Jersey State Police Academy and the New Jersey Division of Criminal Justice Academy. He is a certified forensic locksmith, one of only twenty-nine in the world. Rible is a resident of Wall Township, New Jersey where he lives with his wife Jacqueline and one daughter.

Rible is a member of the Belmar Fire Department, the Belmar First Aid Squad, and the Wall Township Police Department (as a patrolman, hostage negotiator, crime prevention officer and forensic specialist). Rible retired from the Wall Township Police Department in 1998 at age 31 due to a back injury that left him "totally and permanently disabled" and qualified him for an enhanced pension of $54,000 in addition to his salary as a legislator. A News 12 New Jersey investigation in 2010 found that Rible rehabilitates regularly at a gym and runs in road races. The state pension board notified Rible that he may be subject to annual medical exams to confirm that he is still disabled. Rible served on the Wall Township Planning Board from 2000 to 2007. He remains the chairman of the Wall Township Patrolmen's Benevolent Association's fundraising committee after serving as the organization's treasurer and president.

== Legislative career ==
Rible was first elected to the General Assembly from the 11th District in 2007 alongside Mary Pat Angelini. The two were re-elected in 2009. Following the 2011 legislative redistricting, Rible's hometown of Wall Township was moved to the 30th District. He and one of his predecessors in the Assembly Sean T. Kean, were elected to the 30th in 2011 and 2013.

In the Assembly, Rible served as an Assistant Republican Whip (2008-2009), Deputy Conference Leader in 2009, the Republican Whip (2010-2011), and was elected Republican Conference Leader in January 2012. He served in the Assembly on the Education Committee and the Law and Public Safety Committee.

=== Resignation ===
On June 15, 2017, Rible was nominated by Governor Chris Christie to be Director of the New Jersey Division of Alcoholic Beverage Control. The nomination was confirmed by the State Senate on July 4, and Rible resigned his Assembly seat to take the position on July 17. Rible was succeeded in the Assembly by Ned Thomson, a former mayor of Wall Township.

New Jersey General Assembly
Preceded by Jonathan Orsen (acting)	Director of the New Jersey Division of Alcoholic Beverage Control; July 17, 2017 – present	Succeeded by Incumbent
Preceded by Ronald S. Dancer; Joseph R. Malone	Member of the New Jersey General Assembly for the 30th District; January 10, 2012 – July 17, 2017; With: Sean T. Kean	Succeeded by Ned Thomson
Preceded by Steve Corodemus; Sean T. Kean	Member of the New Jersey General Assembly for the 11th District; January 8, 2008 – January 10, 2012; With: Mary Pat Angelini	Succeeded by Caroline Casagrande
