= Mayor of Asbury Park, New Jersey =

Political office in the United States

Asbury Park, New Jersey incorporated as a borough by an act of the New Jersey Legislature on March 26, 1874, from portions of Ocean Township. The borough was reincorporated on February 28, 1893. Asbury Park was incorporated as a city, its current type of government, as of March 25, 1897. The city has seen various changes in its form of government. It had directly elected mayors under its first two forms of government beginning in 1874. In 1915, the city adopted mayor-council form of government with a commission. It reorganized under the 1923 Municipal Manager Law in that year. In 2011, it became mayor-council.

== Mayors ==
Image	Name	Term	Party	Notes
	John Moor	2014–Present		Elected mayor in November 2014 after the electorate voted to change the form of government with the direct election of the mayor
	Myra Campbell	2013–2014		First African-American female mayor. Was appointed in July 2013 in a 3-2 City Council vote despite being the second-to-lowest vote getter, breaking tradition.
	Ed Johnson	2009–2013		5th African-American mayor. Served three terms on Asbury Park City Council. Appointed to vacancy as City Councilman in 2005, Elected City Councilman in 2005 and reelected in 2009. Appointed to Asbury Park Urban Enterprise Zone Board in 1998. Served as Chairman of Urban Enterprise Zone Board 1999 - 2004 rebuilding the board of directors and Asbury Park UEZ Operations. Served as Mayor during the historic start of the ongoing city-wide redevelopment of Asbury Park. Created the Springwood Avenue Advisory Committee (SAAC) and served as SAAC Chairman which developed on-going Springwood Avenue Redevelopment Plan recognized by 2008 Planning Merit Award for the Amended Springwood Avenue Redevelopment Plan and the 2008 Achievement in Planning Award from the New Jersey Planning Officials for community-based planning. Founded the Transportation Station Subcommittee charged with the repairs and upgrades to the Asbury Park Transportation Center bolstering commuter and tourism rail service to the city. Oversaw preparation and reconstruction of the city during August 2011 Earthquake, 2011 Hurricane Irene and 2012 Superstorm Sandy. Developed Sister City Exchange Program with Casalgrande, Italy hosting Mayor Andrea Rossi in Asbury Park and leading a City delegation to Italy in 2012. Honored with Presidential visit to the city by President Barack Obama in May 2013. Retired as Mayor on June 30, 2019. Entered private life as president and Founder of Ed Johnson AP International civic engagement consulting firm. Continues public service as Honorary Member and Ambassador of the Global Parliament of Mayors.
	Kevin G. Sanders	2001–2005; 2005–2009		4th African-American mayor
	Kenneth E. Saunders Sr. (born 17 August 1944)	1997–2001		3rd African-American mayor. Kenneth "Butch" Saunders was first elected to the City Council in 1996 to fill an unexpired term.
	Carl Williams Jr.	1996–1997		2nd African-American mayor
	Patricia Candiano	1994–1996		First woman mayor of Asbury Park Named mayor in March 1994 after prior mayor resigned after being charge with cocaine possession. Lost a recall election in February 1996.
	Dennis M. Buckley	1993–1994		Resigned in March 1994 after being charged with cocaine possession
	Thomas S. Smith (1917–2002)	1989–1993	Republican	First African-American mayor. Served on the Asbury Park Council from 1985 to 1989 and was Asbury Park Police Chief from 1968 to 1979
	Frank Fiorentino	1985–1989		
	Ray Kramer (August 20, 1918 – August 27, 1992)	1973–1977; 1977–1981; 1981–1985	Democrat	In 1969, Raymond Paul Kramer was elected to the City Council of Asbury Park, the first person of Jewish descent to serve on the City Council. In May 1973, he was elected by the City Council as mayor. Elected to the Monmouth County Board of Chosen Freeholders in 1974. Ray Kramer was chosen as Director of the Monmouth County Board of Chosen Freeholders in April 1976 to succeed Philip N. Gumbs, who had been appointed to the Worker's Compensation Court, and served in that capacity for the balance of the year. He again served as Director in 1979 and 1980. After serving two, three-year terms, he was defeated for reelection to a third term in 1980. In 1981, he attempted a return to the Board, but was again defeated. Kramer was elected to his third and final term in 1982, but was defeated by his Republican opponent, former County Administrator Theodore J. Narozanick. He lost a 1988 re-match with Narozanick
	Joseph F. Mattice	1969–1973		
	Frank H. Rowland	1965–1969		
	Thomas F. Shebell	1957–1961; 1961–1965		
	George A. Smock II	1944–1945; 1945–1949; 1949–1953; 1953–1957		Elected mayor in 1944 to finish Mooney's term; re-elected in 1945 to a 4-year term; re-elected in 1949; re-elected in 1953.
	Vincent P. Keuper	1944		Acting mayor after Mooney's death
	Clarence V. Mooney †	1941–1944		Died in office on January 13, 1944
	Clarence Eugene Francis Hetrick	1935–1940 (2nd term)		Won after a recall election
	John C. Palmateer	1935		
	Sherman Oviatt Dennis (1879-1935)	1934-1935		Hotel owner Died March 17, 1935
	Clarence Eugene Francis Hetrick (1873–1941)	1915–1933 (1st term)		Died October 13, 1941
	William A. Berry	1914		Died March 2, 1931, age 62
	Reginald S. Bennett	1912–1913	Democrat	First Democratic mayor. Died June 8, 1928, age 52
	Thomas Frank Appleby (1864–1924)	1908–1911		
	Charles A. Atkins	1906–1907		Died November 7, 1922, age 39
	Frank LaRue Ten Broeck	1904–1905 (2nd term)		
	Bruce S. Keator	1903		Acting mayor. Died March 8, 1925, age 70
	James Adam Bradley	1902		Died June 6, 1921, age 92
	Frank LaRue Ten Broeck	March 25, 1897 – 1901 (1st term)		First mayor of the city of Asbury Park
	James Adam Bradley (1830-1921)	February 28, 1893 – March 25, 1897		James Adam Bradley was the founder of the borough of Asbury Park; The title "mayor" seems to have been loosely applied to the leader of the borough with both Bradley and Frank LaRue Ten Broeck referred to as such.
