= Commerce National Insurance =

US insurance agency

- Industry: insurance
- Headquarters: Cherry Hill, New Jersey
- Area served: United States
- Subsidiaries: Commerce Bancorp

Commerce National Insurance, Commerce National Insurance Services, or Commerce Insurance Services is the insurance subsidiary of Commerce Bancorp and maintains its headquarters in Cherry Hill, New Jersey. Commerce National is one of the 25 largest insurance agencies in the United States, and is licensed in all 50 states. The current chief executive of Commerce National is George Norcross III.
