= John D'Amico Jr. =

American politician

Chair of the New Jersey State Parole Board
- In office 2003–2007
- Succeeded by: Peter J. Barnes Jr.

Judge of the New Jersey Superior Court
- In office 1992

Member of the New Jersey Senate from the 11th district
- In office December 10, 1988 – 1989
- Preceded by: Frank Pallone
- Succeeded by: Joseph A. Palaia

Member of the Monmouth County Board of Chosen Freeholders
- In office 2007–2010
- In office 1983–1989

Member of Council of Oceanport, New Jersey
- In office 1979–1984

Personal details
- Born: January 24, 1941 (age 85) Long Branch, New Jersey, US
- Party: Democrat
- Education: Red Bank Regional High School
- Alma mater: Harvard College; Harvard Law School

John D'Amico Jr. (born January 24, 1941) is an American Democratic Party politician from New Jersey, who served on the Monmouth County, New Jersey Board of Chosen Freeholders and served in the New Jersey Senate in 1988 and 1989.

Born in Long Branch on January 24, 1941, D'Amico attended Red Bank Regional High School. He graduated from Harvard College in 1963 and from Harvard Law School in 1966.

D’Amico served as a Councilman in Oceanport, New Jersey from 1979 to 1984 and was elected to a three-year term as a Monmouth County Freeholder in 1983. He was reelected in 1986. As Freeholder, he helped found the Monmouth County Department of Transportation and the Office of Recycling.

Following the death of Representative James J. Howard, State Senator Frank Pallone was elected to fill the vacancy. On December 10, 1988, John D'Amico was elected to Pallone's senate vacancy by the Democratic County Party Committee members in the 11th Legislative District; he was the first of the state's legislators to be chosen by a political caucus and not popularly elected. Eleven months later, he was defeated in the 1989 general election by Republican Assemblyman Joseph A. Palaia.

During his tenure in the New Jersey Senate, D'Amico sponsored bills on transportation and the environment, including a Green Acres Bond Act and the Clean Water Enforcement Act.

In 1992, he was appointed as a Judge of the New Jersey Superior Court. During his tenure, he developed a streamlined trial procedure called an "Expedited Jury Trial" that is in use statewide and has been emulated in other states. In 2003, he was appointed Chairman of the New Jersey State Parole Board. As Chairman, he implemented a system of graduated sanctions for technical violations of conditions of parole with a focus on rehabilitation. To enhance re-entry programs, he established re-entry task forces to work with individual volunteers, faith-based entities, and nonprofit agencies to address the issues of housing, employment, addiction, gang activity, family reunification, and transportation. He retired from his position as Chairman in 2007.

He was elected to a third three-year term as Freeholder in November 2007. As a freeholder, D'Amico oversaw Planning, Commerce and Education, which includes Brookdale Community College, Economic Development & Tourism, Planning Board, Superintendent of Schools and the Vocational Board of Education.

He served as Deputy Director of the board in 2009. At the January 7, 2010, annual reorganization, he was succeeded as Deputy Director by Robert D. Clifton.

D'Amico, after the election and short of his 70th birthday, announced his retirement from politics. He was the recipient of the 2016 New Jersey Law Journal Lifetime Achievement Award based on his career in public service, including serving as a superior court judge, chairman of the state parole board, a state senator, a Monmouth County Freeholder during three different decades at two different times and as an Oceanport councilman.

D'Amico currently serves as Chairman of the Board of Trustees of NY/NJ Baykeeper, a non-profit environmental organization. NY/NJ Baykeeper's mission is to protect, preserve, and restore the ecological integrity and productivity of the Hudson-Raritan Estuary. He is also a member of the Board of Directors of the Friends of the Monmouth County Parks.

His book, "Murder, Media, and Metamorphosis: A Memoir and Guidebook to Save Democracy and the Planet", is available on Amazon and Barnes and Noble.
