= Thomas S. Smith (politician) =

American politician (1917–2002)

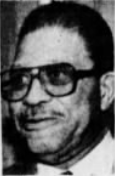

Member of the New Jersey General Assembly from the 11th district
- In office January 14, 1992 – September 26, 2002 Serving with Steve Corodemus
- Preceded by: Daniel P. Jacobson
- Succeeded by: Sean T. Kean

Mayor of Asbury Park, New Jersey
- In office 1989–1993
- Preceded by: Frank Fiorentino
- Succeeded by: Dennis M. Buckley

Personal details
- Born: December 14, 1917 Bloomfield, New Jersey, U.S.
- Died: September 26, 2002 (aged 84) Trenton, New Jersey, U.S.
- Party: Republican

Thomas S. Smith (December 14, 1917 – September 26, 2002) was an American Republican Party politician, who served in the New Jersey General Assembly from 1992 until his death in 2002, where he represented the 11th legislative district. At the time of his death, Smith was the oldest serving member of the Assembly and was the only African American Republican in the New Jersey Legislature.

== Biography ==
He was born on December 14, 1917, in Bloomfield, New Jersey and graduated from Asbury Park High School. attended Howard University, majoring in education.

He served in the United States Army from 1942 to 1945, attaining the rank of First Sergeant.

He was the Mayor of Asbury Park, New Jersey from July 1989 to 1993, served on the Asbury Park Council from 1985 to 1989 and was Asbury Park Police Chief from 1968 to 1979.

In the assembly, he was the Deputy Speaker from 1998 to 2001, Majority Whip from 1996 to 1998, and the Assistant Majority Whip in 1996. He served in the Assembly on the Senior Issues Committee. Smith served on the Martin Luther King Jr. Commission from 1995 until his death, the New Jersey Commission on Discrimination in Public Procurement and Construction in 1992 and the Monmouth County Volunteers in Probation Board of Directors in 1992.

He died on September 26, 2002.

== Legacy ==
District 11 Republican County Committee members voted to fill the vacancy created by Smith's death by naming Sean T. Kean to fill the seat.

== See also ==
- List of first African-American mayors
