= Frank Megaro =

American politician (1933–2015)

Frank G. Megaro (May 28, 1933 – March 24, 2015) was an American Democratic Party politician who served as a City Councilman in Newark, New Jersey and in the New Jersey General Assembly.

== Life and career ==
Megaro was a graduate of Fairleigh Dickinson University and worked in Newark as an insurance broker. He was elected to the Newark City Council in 1970, winning the North Ward seat. In 1971, he was elected to the State Assembly from Essex County District 11B. The top vote getter in that race was Anthony Imperiale, also a Newark City Councilman, who ran as an Independent. Imperiale received 13,857 votes, with Megaro winning the second seat with 12,436 votes. Defeated were Megaro's running mate, Democratic Assemblyman Paul Policastro with 10,825 votes, followed by Republican Assemblyman C. Richard Fiore with 8,215 votes, Republican Ralph D'Ambola (7,351 votes), Independent Ronald J. Del Mauro (3,323 votes), and Independent Nicholas A. Ciufi II (2,729 votes).

He ran for re-election to a second term in 1973, but lost the Democratic primary. The newly-drawn 30th Legislative District included Newark's North Ward and Belleville in Essex County and Kearny and Harrison in Hudson County. Michael Adubato, the brother of North Ward political leader Steve Adubato Sr., and John F. Cali of Kearny, won with 9,289 and 8,435 votes, respectively. Megaro lost by 412 votes, receiving a total of 8,023. Fiorentino Alati finished 4th with 7,404.

Megaro became Newark City Council President in 1973 following the resignation of Louis Turco. In 1974, he lost his North Ward Council seat to Anthony Carrino, a Newark police officer.

In 1983, Megaro ran again for State Assembly as an Independent in the 28th Legislative District, winning just 3,098 against incumbents Adubato and James Zangari.

In 1995, Megaro pleaded guilty to federal corruption charges connected to a Newark towing contract.

Megaro died on March 24, 2015, at the age of 81.
