= Daniel P. Jacobson =

American politician

Member of the New Jersey General Assembly from the 11th district
- In office January 9, 1990 – January 14, 1992 Serving with John Villapiano
- Preceded by: Paul A. Kapalko
- Succeeded by: Thomas S. Smith; Steve Corodemus

Personal details
- Born: October 29, 1961 (age 65) Long Branch, New Jersey, U.S.
- Party: Democratic

Daniel P. Jacobson (born October 29, 1961) is an American politician who served in the New Jersey General Assembly from the 11th Legislative District from 1990 to 1992.
