= Morton Salkind =

American politician

Member of the New Jersey General Assembly from the 11th Legislative District
- In office January 8, 1974 – January 13, 1976
- Preceded by: District created
- Succeeded by: Marie Sheehan Muhler

Mayor of Marlboro Township
- In office 1969–1975
- Preceded by: Walter Grubb
- Succeeded by: Arthur Goldzweig

Personal details
- Born: June 1, 1932 New York City, New York
- Died: October 4, 2014 (aged 82) Denville Township, New Jersey
- Party: Democratic

Morton Salkind (June 1, 1932 – October 4, 2014) was an American politician who served as the Mayor of Marlboro Township from 1969 to 1975 and in the New Jersey General Assembly from 1974 to 1976.

He died of liver cancer on October 4, 2014, in Denville Township, New Jersey at age 82.
