= Ronald Owens =

American politician

Member of the New Jersey General Assembly
- In office January 11, 1966 – January 10, 1978
- Preceded by: Multi-member district
- Succeeded by: Eugene H. Thompson
- Constituency: Essex County (1966–1968); District 11B (1968–1972); District 11A (1972–1974); 29th District (1974–1978)

Personal details
- Born: February 4, 1930; Newark, New Jersey
- Died: June 8, 2005 (aged 75); Newark, New Jersey
- Political party: Democratic

Ronald Owens (February 4, 1930 – June 8, 2005) was an American Democratic Party politician who served in the New Jersey General Assembly from 1966 to 1978.

Born in Newark, Owens graduated from Central High School in 1948 and earned a B.A. in political science from Rutgers University in 1953. After serving in the Signal Corps from 1953 to 1955, he became a teacher in the Newark Public Schools. Later, he attended Seton Hall University where he earned a law degree, was admitted to the New Jersey Bar in 1962, and opened a law practice in Newark.

Owens was a member of the Board of Education of the Newark Public Schools from 1963 to 1966. In 1965, he was elected to the General Assembly from an at-large seat consisting of nine members from Essex County. In 1967, he was elected to the newly formed District 11B in Essex County and was reelected there in 1969. He was reelected in District 11A centered about the South Ward of Newark and Ironbound district in 1971. Owens was reelected two more times in a similar district, later numbered as the 29th. He did not run for reelection in 1977.

He died on June 8, 2005.
