= Walter J. Kozloski =

American politician

Member of the New Jersey General Assembly from the 11th Legislative District
- In office January 8, 1974 – November 25, 1979
- Preceded by: District created
- Succeeded by: John O. Bennett

Personal details
- Born: March 6, 1935 Plymouth, Pennsylvania, U.S.
- Died: November 25, 1979 (aged 44) Long Branch, New Jersey, U.S.
- Party: Democratic

Walter J. Kozloski (March 6, 1935 – November 25, 1979) was an American politician who served in the New Jersey General Assembly from the 11th Legislative District from 1974 to 1979.

In 1976 Kozloski opposed the legalization of gambling in Atlantic City, arguing that it would make the city "the haven for the racketeer, for the corrupt, for everything that would spell disaster for New Jersey.”
