= Frank J. Dodd =

American businessman and politician

President of the New Jersey Senate
- In office 1974–1975
- Preceded by: Alfred N. Beadleston
- Succeeded by: Matthew Feldman

Member of the New Jersey Senate
- In office January 11, 1972 – January 10, 1982
- Preceded by: Multi-member district
- Succeeded by: James P. Vreeland
- Constituency: 11th District (at-large) (1972–1974); 26th district (1974–1982)

Member of the New Jersey General Assembly
- In office January 11, 1966 – January 13, 1970
- Constituency: Essex County (1966–1968); District 11D (1968–1970)

Member of the New Jersey Casino Control Commission
- In office 1989–1993
- Preceded by: Carl Zeitz
- Succeeded by: Diane M. Legreide

Personal details
- Born: February 4, 1938 Orange, New Jersey, U.S.
- Died: May 14, 2010 (aged 72) Neptune, New Jersey, U.S.
- Party: Democratic
- Spouse: Lizbeth Reich Dodd
- Website: Infosite

Frank J. "Pat" Dodd (February 4, 1938 – May 14, 2010) was an American businessman and Democratic Party politician who served as President of the New Jersey Senate from 1974 to 1975.

== Early life ==
Dodd was born in Orange, New Jersey, in 1938. He was educated at Upsala College and Seton Hall University. He founded Dodd Enterprises, operating two cocktail lounges, a restaurant, and a travel agency, based out of West Orange.

== Political career ==
Dodd was elected to the New Jersey General Assembly at the age of 27, serving for two terms, from 1966 to 1970. In the Assembly Dodd served on the Labor Relations, Banking and Insurance, and Public Safety, Defense, and Veteran's Affairs Committees.

In 1971 Dodd was elected to the New Jersey Senate to represent the 11th Legislative District and was re-elected in 1973 in the 26th Legislative District. He served as Senate president from 1974 to 1975, also serving as acting governor during that time.

In the 1977 Democratic primary for the Senate seat, Dodd faced opposition from Assemblyman Eldridge Hawkins and tennis star Althea Gibson, who was serving as state Athletic Commissioner. Dodd was supported by the Essex County Democratic organization under County Chairman Harry Lerner. With Gibson and Hawkins splitting the anti-organization vote, Dodd won the nomination and the subsequent general election. In 1981, Dodd gave up his Senate seat to run in the Democratic primary for Governor of New Jersey. His successor in the Senate in the area was Richard Codey.

The 1981 Democratic primary included a crowded field of 13 candidates, led by U.S. Representative James Florio, U.S. Representative Robert A. Roe, Newark Mayor Kenneth A. Gibson, Senate President Joseph P. Merlino, Attorney General John J. Degnan, and Jersey City Mayor Thomas F. X. Smith. Dodd finished in seventh place with 4 percent of the vote behind Florio (26 percent), Roe (16 percent), Gibson (16 percent), Merlino (11 percent), Degnan (11 percent), and Smith (9 percent).

== Career after politics ==
In the fall of 1981, Dodd was selected by governor-elect Thomas Kean and outgoing governor Brendan Byrne to serve as the chairman of the New Jersey Hazardous Waste Siting Commission, tasked with selecting sites for toxic waste incinerators. The commission received heavy public criticism for its recommendation of potential toxic waste sites throughout the state.

In 1989, Kean appointed Dodd to a five-year term on the New Jersey Casino Control Commission. He served until the end of 1993.

Dodd later competed as a sport fisherman, participating in billfish tournaments in Key West and the Turks and Caicos Islands. He resided in Manasquan, New Jersey. He died on May 14, 2010, in Neptune Township, New Jersey.

Political offices
Preceded by Alfred N. Beadleston	President of the New Jersey Senate; 1974–1975	Succeeded by Matthew Feldman
