= Alfred N. Beadleston =

American politician (1912–2000)

Member of the New Jersey Senate
- In office 1968–1978
- Preceded by: Office created
- Succeeded by: S. Thomas Gagliano
- Constituency: 5th district (1968–74); 11th district (1974–78)

Member of the New Jersey General Assembly
- In office 1952–1968

Mayor of Shrewsbury, New Jersey
- In office 1941–1952

Personal details
- Born: February 20, 1912 Rumson, New Jersey, U.S.
- Died: January 18, 2000 (aged 87) Red Bank, New Jersey, U.S.
- Party: Republican
- Spouse(s): Sylvia Lawrence White (m. 1935, div.); Isabel Palmer Morrell Waud (m. 1948)
- Education: Fay School; St. Paul's School; Yale University

Alfred Nash Beadleston Jr. (February 20, 1912 – January 18, 2000) was an American Republican Party politician who served as Speaker of the New Jersey General Assembly and President of the New Jersey Senate.

== Biography ==
Alfred N. Beadleston (far right) checks election results with other successful Monmouth County Republican candidates in Freehold. Red Bank Register November 1961

Beadleston was born in Rumson, New Jersey, in 1912 to Alfred Nash Beadleston, Sr. (1848–1915), partner in the Beadleston & Woerz brewery, and his wife Helen F. Hazard (1888–1937), daughter of Edward Clarke Hazard of the grocery firm E. C. Hazard and Company. His parents made headlines when they married in 1909, when the elder Beadleston was 60 years old and his bride was only 21. This was his father's second marriage.

Beadleston attended Fay School in Southborough, Massachusetts, and St. Paul's School in Concord, New Hampshire, and Yale College. After graduating in 1934, Beadleston converted the family brewing company's facilities into commercial property and embarked on a career in public service. In 1938 he was elected to the Shrewsbury Borough Council, and two years later he was elected as Mayor of Shrewsbury, New Jersey. He served as Shrewsbury mayor from 1941 to 1952.

In 1951 Beadleston was elected to the General Assembly from Monmouth County. In 1954 he authored legislation commonly known as "The Beadleston Act," which protected students in the State of New Jersey with educational disabilities by guaranteeing their right to special education. The Beadleston Act is highly regarded as the cornerstone predecessor to the Education for All Handicapped Children Act, and subsequently the Individuals with Disabilities Education Act.

Beadleston was named Speaker of the Assembly in 1964. In 1967 he was elected to the State Senate. He served as Senate President in 1973, becoming one of the few politicians in state history to hold the leadership posts in both houses of the legislature.

Beadleston declined to run for another Senate term in 1977, retiring to his Rumson home. He died on January 18, 2000, at Riverview Medical Center in Red Bank at the age of 88.

== Family ==
Beadleston's first marriage, to Sylvia Lawrence White on February 16, 1935. They had William Beadleston, their son, in 1936. Their marriage ended in divorce. He married Isabel Palmer Morrell Waud on February 7, 1948. She was the widow of Dr. Sydney P. Waud of Chicago, a colonel in the Army Medical Corps.

Political offices
Preceded by Elmer Matthews	Speaker of the New Jersey General Assembly; 1964	Succeeded by Marion West Higgins
Preceded by Raymond Bateman	President of the New Jersey Senate; 1973	Succeeded by Frank J. Dodd
