= John O. Bennett =

American politician

John Orus Bennett III

Acting Governor of New Jersey
- In office January 8, 2002 – January 12, 2002
- Preceded by: John Farmer Jr. (acting)
- Succeeded by: Richard Codey (acting)

President of the New Jersey Senate
- In office January 8, 2002 – January 14, 2004 Serving with Richard Codey (co-presidents)
- Preceded by: Robert E. Littell (acting)
- Succeeded by: Richard Codey

Majority Leader of the New Jersey Senate
- In office January 11, 1994 – January 8, 2002
- Preceded by: John H. Dorsey
- Succeeded by: Anthony R. Bucco; Robert Singer

Member of the New Jersey Senate from the 12th district
- In office May 22, 1989 – January 13, 2004
- Preceded by: S. Thomas Gagliano
- Succeeded by: Ellen Karcher

Member of the New Jersey General Assembly
- In office January 8, 1980 – May 22, 1989
- Preceded by: Walter J. Kozloski
- Succeeded by: Michael Arnone
- Constituency: 11th district (1980–1982); 12th district (1982–1989)

Personal details
- Born: August 6, 1948 (age 78) New Jersey, U.S.
- Party: Republican
- Spouse: Peg Bennett
- Education: West Virginia University (BA); Seton Hall University (JD)

John Orus Bennett III (born August 6, 1948) is an American former politician from New Jersey. A member of the Republican Party, he served as a state senator, and between 2002 and 2004, as president of the state senate. Bennett served as acting governor of New Jersey for four days in January 2002.

== Education ==
Bennett attended Dickinson College from 1966 to 1968, graduated from West Virginia University with a B.A. in 1970, and earned a J.D. from Seton Hall University School of Law in 1974.

== Acting governor ==
Bennett acted as governor for three and a half days in January 2002. Following Republican Governor Christine Todd Whitman's resignation on January 31, 2001 to become head of the EPA, Bennett was one of three different senate presidents (along with Donald DiFrancesco and Richard Codey, and furthermore Attorney General John Farmer Jr.) to serve as acting governor for the one-year period between Whitman's resignation and the inauguration of the Democratic governor-elect Jim McGreevey on January 15, 2002.

Fellow Republican DiFrancesco served as acting governor for almost a year in his capacity as president of the senate, but his term as president ended a few days before the rest of the gubernatorial term was finished, as a new senate had been sworn in. The new senate was evenly divided between Democrats and Republicans, leading Attorney General Farmer to serve as acting governor for about ninety minutes while Republican leader Bennett and Democratic leader Codey agreed to serve as co-presidents of the senate. They also decided to divide the last week of the gubernatorial term among them, with Bennett first serving for three and a half days, from January 8, 2002 to January 12, 2002, before Codey would serve the remaining three and a half days. By the time McGreevey took office on January 15, he was the fifth person to serve as governor in the preceding eight days.

During his service as acting governor, Bennett signed legislation into law, appointed judges, granted a pardon to Hugh G. Gallagher, created a nursing advisory council, and hosted several parties at Drumthwacket. The nursing advisory council was a tribute to his wife, Peg, a nurse.

Before he became Senate President, Bennett served as Senate Majority Leader.

== Controversies ==
In June 2002, Bennett was involved in a shoving match with South Jersey Democratic Party boss and Commerce National Insurance CEO George Norcross after Norcross threatened to publicize a pardon Bennett gave during his three-day executive tenure if Bennett could not convince his fellow Republican senators to vote for a tax increase and stadium construction bill in committee.

Bennett fell out of favor as a result of allegations that he overbilled the municipality of Marlboro Township for legal services. In a statement to the press, Bennett blamed party bosses and a biased press for attempting to destroy him. Bennett was a leading opponent of using state funds to construct a convention center/stadium in Pennsauken Township, New Jersey that would have been used by a minor league ice hockey team in which Norcross had bought an interest.

== 2003 Election ==
John Bennett failed in his 2003 bid for re-election to the State Senate, falling to Ellen Karcher, 52%-43%, with the Green Party of New Jersey candidate winning 5% of the vote.

== Current activities ==
In the 2005 primary election he was elected Republican State Committeeman for Monmouth County. John O. Bennett is also a professor at Montclair State University. In June 2012 he was elected the chairman of the Monmouth County Republican Party Committee during its annual reorganization meeting. After being ousted from the chairmanship by county sheriff Shaun Golden, Bennett served as an administrator for Oceanport, Lavallette, and Woodbridge.

In September 2020, he was appointed as the Interim Administrator in Dover, New Jersey. His appointment was made permanent in April 2021.

== Personal life ==
Bennett was hospitalized in January 2022 after a traffic accident with a school bus. The crash may have been caused by a medical incident.

== Sources ==
- Murphy, Brian P. (July 1, 2002). Senatorial suspense on the CBT and arena, web.archive.org; accessed July 8, 2021.
- New Jersey Governor John O. Bennett, National Governors Association
- Dilworth Paxson biography

New Jersey General Assembly
Preceded by Walter J. Kozloski	Member of the New Jersey General Assembly from the 11th district January 8, 1980–January 12, 1982	Succeeded by Anthony M. Villane
Preceded by Richard Van Wagner	Member of the New Jersey General Assembly from the 12th district January 12, 1982–May 22, 1989	Succeeded by Michael Arnone
New Jersey Senate
Preceded by S. Thomas Gagliano	Member of the New Jersey Senate from the 12th district May 22, 1989–January 14, 2004	Succeeded by Ellen Karcher
Preceded by John H. Dorsey	Majority Leader of the New Jersey Senate; January 11, 1994–January 8, 2002	Succeeded by Anthony R. Bucco; Robert Singer
Political offices
Preceded by Robert E. Littell; Acting Governor	Acting Governor of New Jersey; January 8, 2002–January 12, 2002	Succeeded by Richard Codey; Acting Governor
Preceded by Robert E. Littell (Acting)	President of the New Jersey Senate (co-president); January 8, 2002–January 14, 2004	Succeeded by Richard Codey
