= C. Richard Fiore =

American politician

C. Richard Fiore (July 18, 1931 – July 12, 2003) was an American Republican Party politician who served two terms in the New Jersey General Assembly. Fiore (along with Ralph R. Caputo) was elected as a Republican to the State Assembly in 1967, defeating Eugene Molinaro and Warren Davis in the Republican primary and Democratic incumbents Armand Lembo and Joseph Biancardi. They represented Essex County's District 11C. Fiore and Caputo were re-elected in 1969 against Democrats Carmen Orechio and Joseph Iannuzzi. Fiore lost his bid for a third term in 1971, losing a multi-candidate General Election. The winners were Independent Anthony Imperiale and Democrat Frank G. Megaro, who received 13,857 and 12,436 votes, respectively. Defeated were incumbent Democratic Assemblyman Paul Policastro (10,825 votes), Fiore (8,215 votes), Republican Ralph D'Ambola (7,351 votes), Independent Ronald J. Del Mauro (3,323 votes), and independent Nicholas A. Ciufi II (2,729 votes). Fiore became the Republican nominee for State Senator in 1973, running for an open seat in the newly created 30th district, which comprised Newark's East Ward, and Harrison and Kearny in Hudson County. Imperiale, running as an Independent, won that Senate race with 24,756 votes (49%), against Democrat Gregory J. Castano with 18,286 votes (36%) and Fiore, with 7,131 votes (14%).

Fiore, the Chairman of the Assembly Law and Public Safety Committee, got in some trouble during his first term in the Assembly when he reportedly asked to cancel a hearing on organized crime under pressure from one of the state's most powerful mob bosses, Gerardo Catena. Senate Law and Public Safety Committee Chairman Joseph Woodcock held a news conference in December 1968 to say that his aide was told by Fiore that he was being pressured by Catena to stop legislative proposals to create the State Commission of Investigation, and to legalize wiretapping, and to permit certain witnesses to receive immunity from prosecution. New Jersey Attorney General's office investigators were told that Fiore claimed he wanted to head the Assembly panel "to stop these kind of things." "There is a lot of pressure. You just don't know how much pressure. Jerry is unhappy about it," A Woodcock aide quoted Fiore as telling her. The New York Times reported that Fiore claimed he had never heard of Catena. "Listen, every time an Italian boy starts to rise in the state, they try to bury him," Fiore told the New York Times. "The got (Newark Mayor) Hugh Addonizio. They got (Newark Police Director) Dominick Spina and they got (former Essex County State Senator Robert) Sarcone. Now they want to get me. I tell you it's a conspiracy against the Italian boys." The only proof offered up by an investigator was a phone bill that showed a toll call to Fiore's home on the day he allegedly made his comments.
