= Joseph Biancardi =

American politician

Joseph F. Biancardi (July 7, 1906 – February 4, 1984) was an American Democratic Party politician and labor leader who served in the New Jersey General Assembly from 1966 to 1968. Biancardi was elected as an Assemblyman from Essex County in 1965, and lost his bid for re-election to a second term in 1967 to Republicans Ralph R. Caputo and C. Richard Fiore. He was the President of Teamsters Industrial and Allied Workers Local 97. On January 23, 1970, Biancardi and two associates were indicted on charges on embezzling union funds. In 1973, Biancardi was sentenced to two years probation and fined $10,000. Biancardi was in the news in 1978 when a New York Times Magazine outed him as having a hidden interest in an Atlantic City casino.
