= Paul Policastro =

American politician

Paul Policastro (August 29, 1900 – November 4, 1981) was an American Democratic Party politician who served five terms in the New Jersey General Assembly.

He was a graduate of Lafayette College and Rutgers Law School and served in the U.S. Army during World War II. He served on the Newark Board of Adjustment from 1953 to 1954. He first ran for the State Assembly in 1959, but lost. He ran again in 1961 and won. He was re-elected in 1963, 1965, 1967, and 1969. He served as Assistant Majority Leader in 1966 and as Majority Leader in 1967. Had Democrats not lost the majority in the 1967 election, Policastro was expected to become Assembly Speaker. In 1971, Policastro lost his bid for re-election to a fifth term, losing to an independent candidate, Newark vigilante leader Anthony Imperiale. Imperiale received 13,857 votes, followed by Policastro's running mate, incumbent Democratic Assemblyman Frank Megaro with 12,436 votes. Policastro ran third with 10,825 votes, followed by incumbent Republican Assemblyman C. Richard Fiore with 8,215 votes and Republican challenger Ralph D'Ambola with 7,351 votes.
