= 2023 New Jersey Senate election =

2023 New Jersey State Senate election
- November 7, 2023

All 40 seats in the New Jersey Senate 21 seats needed for a majority
- Turnout: 27% (▼13pp)

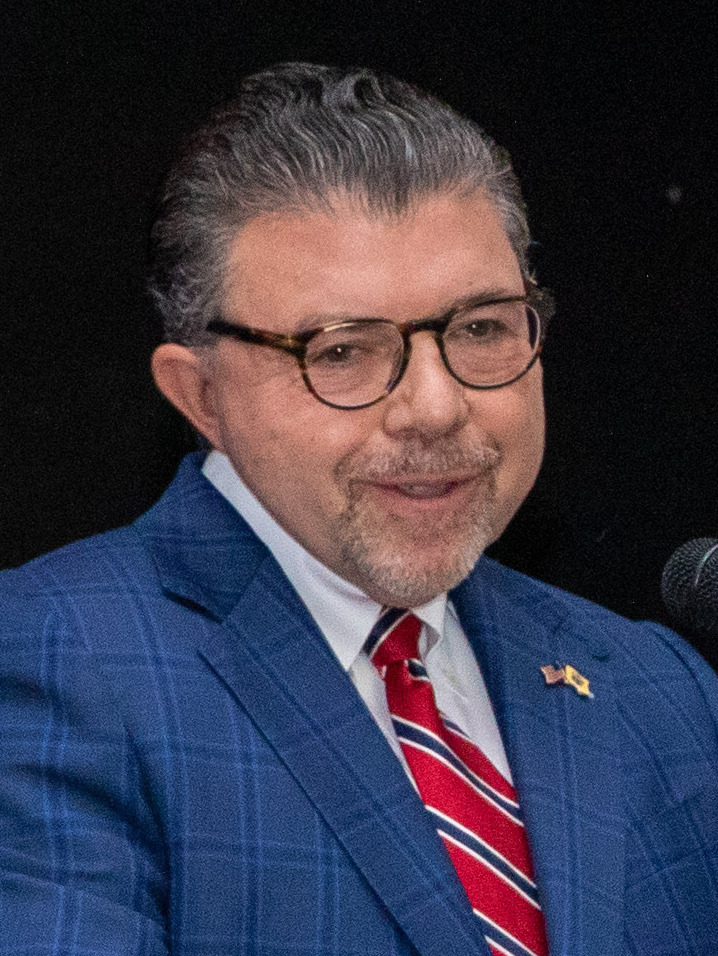
	Majority party	Minority party
Leader	Nicholas Scutari	Anthony M. Bucco
Party	Democratic	Republican
Leader since	January 11, 2022	July 1, 2023
Leader's seat	22nd (Linden)	25th (Boonton Twp.)
Last election	24 seats	16 seats
Seats before	25	15
Seats won	25	15
Seat change	Steady	Steady
Popular vote	922,977	772,680
Percentage	54.2%	45.4%
Swing	▲2.3%	▼2.6%
- Democratic hold Democratic gain Republican hold Republican gain
Senate President before election
Nicholas Scutari
Democratic
Elected Senate President
Nicholas Scutari
Democratic

The 2023 New Jersey State Senate elections were held on November 7, 2023. New Jersey voters elected state senators in all of the state's legislative districts for a four-year term to the New Jersey Senate. This was the first election after redistricting following the 2020 United States census. The winners of these elections were sworn in on January 9, 2024.

Democrats retained their 25–15 majority over Republicans. Democrats flipped one seat, the 3rd district. Republicans flipped the 12th district from an elected Republican who became a Democrat in February 2023.

== Incumbents not running for re-election ==
As per 2021 redistricting

=== Democratic ===
- Richard Codey, District 27 (withdrew after renomination)
- Sandra Bolden Cunningham, District 31
- Fred H. Madden, District 4
- Nicholas Sacco, District 32 (redistricted into District 33)
- Samuel D. Thompson, District 12 (previously elected as a Republican)

=== Republican ===
- Christopher J. Connors, District 9
- Steve Oroho, District 24
- Jean Stanfield, District 8

In addition, two members who were elected in the last election in 2021 left office before the election: Ronald Rice (D-28th, resigned; deceased) and Michael J. Doherty, (R-23rd, resigned).

== Incumbents defeated ==
=== In primary election ===
One incumbent senator, a Democrat, was defeated in a redistricting race in the June 6 primary election.

==== Democratic ====
- Nia Gill, District 27 (redistricted from District 34; lost party endorsement)

=== In general election ===
One incumbent senator, a Republican, was defeated in the November 7 general election.

==== Republican ====
- Ed Durr, District 3

== Predictions ==
Source	Ranking	As of
270toWin	Solid D	September 6, 2023
Elections Daily	Solid D	October 22, 2023

== Results ==
=== Overview ===
↓
25	15
Democratic	Republican

Parties	Candidates	Seats				Popular vote		
Parties	Candidates	2021	2023	+/-	Strength	Vote	%	Change
Democratic	40	24	25	▲1	62.5%	922,977	54.2%	▲2.3
Republican	38	16	15	▼1	37.5%	772,680	45.4%	▼2.6
Libertarian	2	0	0	0	0.0%	2,337	0.1%	▲0.12
Socialist Workers	1	0	0	0	0.0%	821	0.1%	N/A
Independent	5	0	0	0	0.0%	3,668	0.2%	▲0.1
Total	86	40	40		100.00%		100.00%	
Turnout								
Registered								

=== By State Senate district ===
Legislative district	2020 Pres.	Incumbent	Party	Elected senator	Outcome
District 1	R +3.7	Mike Testa	Rep	Mike Testa	Rep
District 2	D +11.5	Vincent J. Polistina	Rep	Vincent J. Polistina	Rep
District 3	R +2.6	Edward Durr	Rep	John J. Burzichelli	Dem
District 4	D +6.9	Fred H. Madden	Dem	Paul D. Moriarty	Dem
District 5	D +36.9	Nilsa Cruz-Perez	Dem	Nilsa Cruz-Perez	Dem
District 6	D +32.5	James Beach	Dem	James Beach	Dem
District 7	D +31.5	Troy Singleton	Dem	Troy Singleton	Dem
District 8	D +4.6	Jean Stanfield	Rep	Latham Tiver	Rep
District 9	R +25.1	Christopher J. Connors	Rep	Carmen Amato	Rep
District 10	R +21.7	James W. Holzapfel	Rep	James W. Holzapfel	Rep
District 11	D +13.2	Vin Gopal	Dem	Vin Gopal	Dem
District 12	R +14.2	Samuel D. Thompson	Dem (Note: Thompson switched from the Republican Party to the Democratic Party in February 2023.)	Owen Henry	Rep
District 13	R +6.7	Declan O'Scanlon	Rep	Declan O'Scanlon	Rep
District 14	D +18.4	Linda R. Greenstein	Dem	Linda R. Greenstein	Dem
District 15	D +47.5	Shirley Turner	Dem	Shirley Turner	Dem
District 16	D +20.8	Andrew Zwicker	Dem	Andrew Zwicker	Dem
District 17	D +45.8	Bob Smith	Dem	Bob Smith	Dem
District 18	D +22	Patrick J. Diegnan	Dem	Patrick J. Diegnan	Dem
District 19	D +19.1	Joe F. Vitale	Dem	Joe F. Vitale	Dem
District 20	D +42.6	Joseph Cryan	Dem	Joseph Cryan	Dem
District 21	D +17.4	Jon Bramnick	Rep	Jon Bramnick	Rep
District 22	D +35.2	Nicholas Scutari	Dem	Nicholas Scutari	Dem
District 23	R +5.3	Doug Steinhardt	Rep	Doug Steinhardt	Rep
District 24	R +14.1	Steve Oroho	Rep	Parker Space	Rep
District 25	D +6.1	Anthony M. Bucco	Rep	Anthony M. Bucco	Rep
District 26	R +1.5	Joseph Pennacchio	Rep	Joseph Pennacchio	Rep
District 27	D +41.9	Richard Codey	Dem	John F. McKeon	Dem
District 27	D +41.9	Nia Gill (Note: Redistricted from the 34th district.)	Dem	John F. McKeon	Dem
District 28	D +84.3	Renee Burgess	Dem	Renee Burgess	Dem
District 29	D +62	Teresa Ruiz	Dem	Teresa Ruiz	Dem
District 30	R +35.5	Robert W. Singer	Rep	Robert W. Singer	Rep
District 31	D +44.9	Sandra Bolden Cunningham	Dem	Angela V. McKnight	Dem
District 32	D +57.2	New seat		Raj Mukherji	Dem
District 33	D +37	Brian P. Stack	Dem	Brian P. Stack	Dem
District 33	D +37	Nicholas Sacco (Note: Redistricted from the 32nd district.)	Dem	Brian P. Stack	Dem
District 34	D +51.5	New seat		Britnee Timberlake	Dem
District 35	D +40.9	Nellie Pou	Dem	Nellie Pou	Dem
District 36	D +13.6	Paul Sarlo	Dem	Paul Sarlo	Dem
District 37	D +40.2	Gordon M. Johnson	Dem	Gordon M. Johnson	Dem
District 38	D +14.1	Joseph Lagana	Dem	Joseph Lagana	Dem
District 39	D +6.4	Holly Schepisi	Rep	Holly Schepisi	Rep
District 40	D +1.4	Kristin Corrado	Rep	Kristin Corrado	Rep

=== Close races ===
Seats where the margin of victory was under 10%:

1. District 8, 2.0%
2. District 25, 5.4%
3. District 21, 7.0%
4. District 3, 7.2% gain
5. District 2, 7.4%
6. District 39, 9.8%
7. District 4, 10.0%

== District 1 ==
2023 New Jersey's 1st State Senate district election
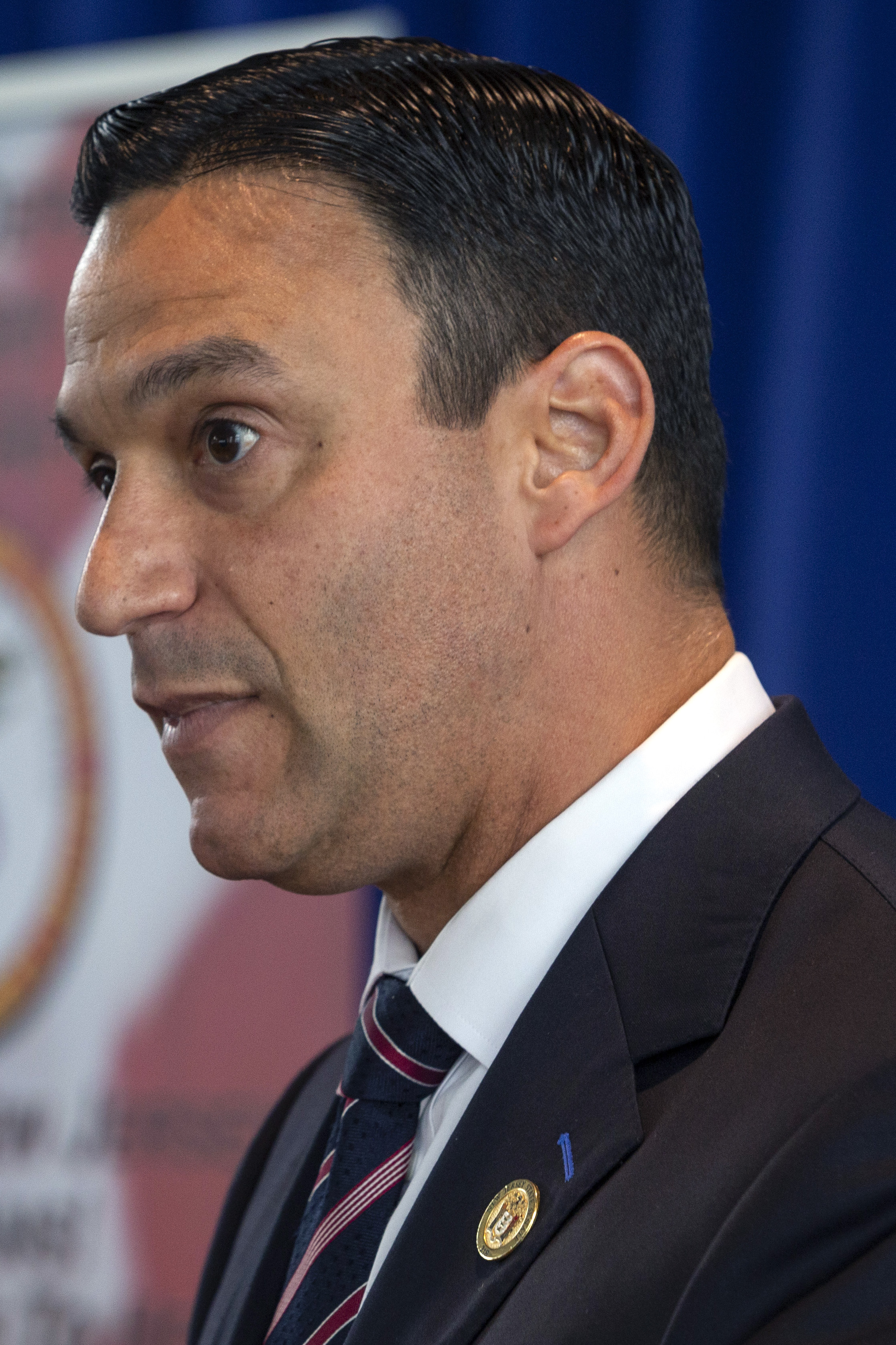
Nominee	Michael Testa	Charles R. LaSpata
Party	Republican	Democratic
Popular vote	29,186	15,972
Percentage	64.6	35.4
- LaSpata: 40–50% 50–60% 60–70% 70–80% 80–90% >90% Testa: 40–50% 50–60% 60–70% 80–90%
State Senator before election
Michael Testa
Republican
Elected State Senator
Michael Testa
Republican

The incumbent is Republican Michael Testa who was re-elected with 64.59% of the vote in 2021. Donald Trump won this district with 51.61% in 2020.

=== Democratic primary ===
==== Nominee ====
- Charles R. LaSpata, electrician

==== Results ====
Democratic primary
Party	Candidate	Votes	%
Democratic	Charles R. LaSpata	6,234	100.0
Total votes		6,234	100.0

=== General election ===
==== Predictions ====
Source	Ranking	As of
Elections Daily	Safe R	October 22, 2023
New Jersey Globe	Solid R	November 2, 2023

=== Republican primary ===
==== Nominee ====
- Michael Testa, incumbent state senator

==== Endorsements ====
Mike Testa (incumbent)

Labor unions

- New Jersey State Policemen’s Benevolent Association

Organizations

- National Federation of Independent Business
- NRA Political Victory Fund
- NEW JOBS PAC

==== Results ====
Republican primary
Party	Candidate	Votes	%
Republican	Michael Testa (incumbent)	8,356	100.0
Total votes		8,356	100.0

== District 2 ==
The incumbent is Republican Vince Polistina who was elected with 51.87% of the vote in 2021. Joe Biden won this district with 55.43% in 2020.

=== Republican primary ===
==== Nominee ====
- Vince Polistina, incumbent state senator

==== Endorsements ====
Vince Polistina (incumbent)

Labor unions

- New Jersey AFL-CIO
- New Jersey State Policemen’s Benevolent Association
- New Jersey Firefighters Mutual Benevolent Association

Organizations

- National Federation of Independent Business
- NEW JOBS PAC

==== Results ====
Republican primary
Party	Candidate	Votes	%
Republican	Vince Polistina (incumbent)	6,205	100.0
Total votes		6,205	100.0

=== Democratic primary ===
==== Nominee ====
- Caren Fitzpatrick, Atlantic County Commissioner and nominee for New Jersey's 2nd assembly district in 2021 (previously filed to run for General Assembly)

==== Withdrawn ====
- Victor Carmona, Pleasantville Councilmember

==== Declined ====
- Harvey Kesselman, President of Stockton University (2016–present)
- Vince Mazzeo, former New Jersey General Assemblymember from the 2nd district (2014–2022) and nominee for this seat in 2021

==== Endorsements ====
Caren Fitzpatrick

Labor unions

- Health Professionals and Allied Employees

Organizations

- New Jersey League of Conservation Voters
- Planned Parenthood Action Fund

==== Results ====
Democratic primary
Party	Candidate	Votes	%
Democratic	Caren Fitzpatrick	7,391	100.0
Total votes		7,391	100.0

=== General election ===
==== Predictions ====
Source	Ranking	As of
Elections Daily	Lean R	October 22, 2023
New Jersey Globe	Lean R	November 2, 2023

==== Results ====
2nd Legislative District General Election, 2023
Party	Candidate	Votes	%
Republican	Vince Polistina (incumbent)	24,516	52.2
Democratic	Caren Fitzpatrick	21,045	44.8
Libertarian	Shawn Peck	1,415	3.0
Total votes		46,976	100.0
Republican hold			

== District 3 ==
The incumbent is Republican Edward Durr who was elected in an upset with 51.68% of the vote in 2021. Donald Trump won this district with 50.71% in 2020.

=== Republican primary ===
==== Nominee ====
- Edward Durr, incumbent state senator

==== Eliminated in primary ====
- Beth Sawyer, New Jersey General Assemblymember from the 3rd district (2022–present)

==== Withdrawn ====
- Mickey Ostrum, Salem County Commissioner

==== Endorsements ====
Edward Durr (incumbent)

Labor unions

- New Jersey State Policemen’s Benevolent Association

Organizations

- National Federation of Independent Business
- NRA Political Victory Fund

==== Convention results ====
Salem County Republican convention
Party	Candidate	Votes	%
Republican	Edward Durr (incumbent)	41	58.57
Republican	Mickey Ostrum	29	41.43
Total votes		70	100.0

==== Primary results ====
Republican primary
Party	Candidate	Votes	%
Republican	Edward Durr (incumbent)	6,629	65.20
Republican	Beth Sawyer	3,538	34.80
Total votes		10,167	100.0

=== Democratic primary ===
==== Nominee ====
- John J. Burzichelli, former New Jersey General Assemblymember from the 3rd district (2002–2022)

==== Eliminated in primary ====
- Mario De Santis, public school teacher and candidate for New Jersey's 1st congressional district in 2022

==== Declined ====
- Stephen Sweeney, former New Jersey State Senator from the 3rd district (2002–2022)

==== Endorsements ====
John Burzichelli

Labor unions

- New Jersey AFL-CIO
- New Jersey Firefighters Mutual Benevolent Association
- Health Professionals and Allied Employees
- SEIU 32BJ

Organizations

- New Jersey League of Conservation Voters
- Planned Parenthood Action Fund
Mario De Santis (eliminated in primary)

Organizations

- Working Families Party

==== Results ====
Democratic primary
Party	Candidate	Votes	%
Democratic	John J. Burzichelli	9,391	73.81
Democratic	Mario De Santis	3,333	26.19
Total votes		12,724	100.0

=== General election ===
==== Predictions ====
Source	Ranking	As of
Elections Daily	Lean R	November 2, 2023
New Jersey Globe	Tossup	November 2, 2023

==== Results ====
3rd Legislative District General Election, 2023
Party	Candidate	Votes	%
Democratic	John J. Burzichelli	32,382	53.6
Republican	Edward Durr (incumbent)	28,018	46.4
Total votes		60,400	100.0
Democratic gain from Republican			

== District 4 ==
The incumbent is Democrat Fred H. Madden who was re-elected with 54.42% of the vote in 2021 and will not be seeking re-election. Joe Biden won this district with 52.96% in 2020.

=== Democratic primary ===
==== Nominee ====
- Paul D. Moriarty, New Jersey General Assemblymember from the 4th district (2006–present)

==== Declined ====
- Fred H. Madden, incumbent state senator
- Gabriela Mosquera, New Jersey General Assemblymember from the 4th district (2012–present)

==== Endorsements ====
Paul Moriarty

Labor unions

- New Jersey AFL-CIO
- New Jersey State Policemen’s Benevolent Association
- New Jersey Firefighters Mutual Benevolent Association
- Health Professionals and Allied Employees

Organizations

- New Jersey League of Conservation Voters
- Planned Parenthood Action Fund
- New Jersey Political Action for Candidate Election PAC

==== Results ====
Democratic primary
Party	Candidate	Votes	%
Democratic	Paul D. Moriarty	12,103	100.0
Total votes		12,103	100.0

=== Republican primary ===
==== Nominee ====
- Christopher Del Borrello, former Washington Township Councilmember

==== Eliminated in primary ====
- Nicholas DeSilvio, Gloucester County Commissioner

==== Endorsements ====
Christopher Del Borrello

Organizations

- National Federation of Independent Business
- NRA Political Victory Fund
- NEW JOBS PAC

==== Debate ====
2023 New Jersey's 4th Senate district republican primary debate
No.	Date	Host	Moderator	Link	Republican	Republican
Key: P Participant A Absent N Not invited I Invited W Withdrawn						
Key: P Participant A Absent N Not invited I Invited W Withdrawn					Christopher Del Borrello	Nicholas DeSilvio
1	May 8, 2023	New Jersey Globe; Save Jersey	Matt Rooney; David Wildstein		P	P

==== Results ====
Republican primary
Party	Candidate	Votes	%
Republican	Christopher Del Borrello	5,335	61.56
Republican	Nicholas DeSilvio	3,331	38.44
Total votes		8,666	100.0

=== General election ===
==== Predictions ====
Source	Ranking	As of
Elections Daily	Lean D	October 22, 2023
New Jersey Globe	Tossup	November 2, 2023

==== Results ====
4th Legislative District General Election, 2023
Party	Candidate	Votes	%
Democratic	Paul D. Moriarty	30,728	53.5
Republican	Christopher W. Del Borrello	25,010	43.5
Conservatives South Jersey	Giuseppe Costanzo	1,712	3.0
Total votes		57,450	100.0
Democratic hold			

== District 5 ==
The incumbent is Democrat Nilsa Cruz-Perez who was re-elected with 57.70% of the vote in 2021. Joe Biden won this district with 68.05% in 2020.

=== Democratic primary ===
==== Nominee ====
- Nilsa Cruz-Perez, incumbent state senator

==== Endorsements ====
Nilsa Cruz-Perez (incumbent)

Labor unions

- New Jersey AFL-CIO
- New Jersey State Policemen’s Benevolent Association
- New Jersey Firefighters Mutual Benevolent Association
- Health Professionals and Allied Employees
- SEIU 32BJ

Organizations

- Planned Parenthood Action Fund
- Sierra Club of New Jersey
- NEW JOBS PAC
- New Jersey Political Action for Candidate Election PAC

==== Results ====
Democratic primary
Party	Candidate	Votes	%
Democratic	Nilsa Cruz-Perez (incumbent)	13,354	100.0
Total votes		13,354	100.0

=== Republican primary ===
==== Nominee ====
- Clyde E. Cook, former Woodlynne Councilmember

==== Results ====
Republican primary
Party	Candidate	Votes	%
Republican	Clyde E. Cook	2,776	100.0
Total votes		2,776	100.0

=== General election ===
==== Predictions ====
Source	Ranking	As of
Elections Daily	Safe D	October 22, 2023
New Jersey Globe	Solid D	November 2, 2023

==== Results ====
5th Legislative District General Election, 2023
Party	Candidate	Votes	%
Democratic	Nilsa Cruz-Perez (incumbent)	25,799	68.7
Republican	Clyde E. Cook	11,245	29.9
Rights Tranquility Peace	Mohammad Kabir	530	1.4
Total votes		37,574	100.0
Democratic hold			

== District 6 ==
The incumbent is Democrat James Beach who was re-elected with 64.85% of the vote in 2021. Joe Biden won this district with 65.74% in 2020.

=== Democratic primary ===
==== Nominee ====
- James Beach, incumbent state senator

==== Endorsements ====
James Beach (incumbent)

Labor unions

- New Jersey AFL-CIO
- New Jersey State Policemen’s Benevolent Association
- New Jersey Firefighters Mutual Benevolent Association
- Health Professionals and Allied Employees

Organizations

- National Federation of Independent Business
- Planned Parenthood Action Fund
- NEW JOBS PAC
- New Jersey Political Action for Candidate Election PAC

==== Results ====
Democratic primary
Party	Candidate	Votes	%
Democratic	James Beach (incumbent)	15,430	100.0
Total votes		15,430	100.0

=== Republican primary ===
Republican primary
Party	Candidate	Votes	%
Republican	Lynn Lofland (write-in)	199	76.0
Republican	Other write-ins	63	24.0
Total votes		262	100.0

Following the primary, Lofland withdrew from the general election on August 28. Mark Doogan was selected as a replacement candidate on August 31.

=== Libertarian convention ===
==== Disqualified ====
- Matthew Asman

=== General election ===
==== Predictions ====
Source	Ranking	As of
Elections Daily	Safe D	October 22, 2023
New Jersey Globe	Solid D	November 2, 2023

==== Results ====
6th Legislative District General Election, 2023
Party	Candidate	Votes	%
Democratic	James Beach (incumbent)	34,911	70.0
Republican	Mark Doogan	14,947	30.0
Total votes		49,858	100.0
Democratic hold			

== District 7 ==
The incumbent is Democrat Troy Singleton who was re-elected with 62.29% of the vote in 2021. Joe Biden won this district with 65.27% in 2020.

=== Democratic primary ===
==== Nominee ====
- Troy Singleton, incumbent state senator

==== Endorsements ====
Troy Singleton (incumbent)

Labor unions

- New Jersey AFL-CIO
- New Jersey State Policemen’s Benevolent Association
- New Jersey Firefighters Mutual Benevolent Association
- SEIU 32BJ

Organizations

- National Federation of Independent Business
- New Jersey League of Conservation Voters
- Planned Parenthood Action Fund
- Sierra Club of New Jersey
- New Jersey Education Association PAC
- NEW JOBS PAC
- New Jersey Political Action for Candidate Election PAC

==== Results ====
Democratic primary
Party	Candidate	Votes	%
Democratic	Troy Singleton (incumbent)	12,744	100.0
Total votes		12,744	100.0

=== Republican primary ===
==== Nominee ====
- James Fazzone, former mayor of Burlington City

==== Results ====
Republican primary
Party	Candidate	Votes	%
Republican	James Fazzone	4,227	100.0
Total votes		4,227	100.0

=== General election ===
==== Predictions ====
Source	Ranking	As of
Elections Daily	Safe D	October 22, 2023
New Jersey Globe	Solid D	November 2, 2023

==== Results ====
7th Legislative District General Election, 2023
Party	Candidate	Votes	%
Democratic	Troy Singleton (incumbent)	33,711	67.7
Republican	James A. Fazzone	16,060	32.3
Total votes		49,771	100.0
Democratic hold			

== District 8 ==
The incumbent is Republican Jean Stanfield who was elected with 51.11% of the vote in 2021 and did not seek re-election. Joe Biden won this district with 51.75% in 2020.

=== Republican primary ===
==== Nominee ====
- Latham Tiver, former Burlington County Commissioner

==== Withdrawn ====
- Will Monk, Mount Holly school board member

==== Declined ====
- Sean Earlen, Chair of the Burlington County Republican Party and former mayor of Lumberton
- Ryan Peters, former New Jersey General Assemblymember from the 8th district (2018–2022)
- Jean Stanfield, incumbent state senator
- Michael Torrissi, New Jersey General Assemblymember from the 8th district (2022–present) (endorsed Tiver; running for re-election)
- Brandon Umba, New Jersey General Assemblymember from the 8th district (2022–present) (endorsed Tiver; running for re-election)

==== Endorsements ====
Latham Tiver

State legislators

- Michael Torrissi, New Jersey General Assemblymember from the 8th district (2022–present)
- Brandon Umba, New Jersey General Assemblymember from the 8th district (2022–present)

Labor unions

- New Jersey AFL-CIO
- New Jersey State Policemen’s Benevolent Association

Organizations

- NEW JOBS PAC

==== Results ====
Republican primary
Party	Candidate	Votes	%
Republican	Latham Tiver	7,497	100.0
Total votes		7,497	100.0

=== Democratic primary ===
==== Nominee ====
- Gaye Burton, former Pemberton Council President

==== Eliminated at convention ====
- Janet DiFolco, Mount Holly Board of Education member

==== Withdrawn ====
- Heather Cooper, Evesham Township Councilmember

==== Declined ====
- Odise Carr, Burlington County Undersheriff
- Raymond Coxe, candidate for Medford Council in 2023
- Primo Cruz, attorney
- Allison Eckel, Burlington County Commissioner and nominee for New Jersey's 8th assembly district in 2021
- Anna Evans, Hainesport Township Committeemember
- Patricia Hansen, Evesham Township Deputy Mayor
- Ron Jaworski, former NFL player
- Andrea Katz, Chesterfield Township Democratic Municipal Chair (running for State Assembly)
- Gina LaPlaca, Deputy Mayor of Lumberton and nominee for New Jersey's 8th assembly district in 2019
- Mark Natale, former Evesham Township Democratic Municipal Chair and nominee for New Jersey's 8th assembly district in 2021
- Rue Ryan, Lumberton Committeemember
- Jaclyn Veasy, Mayor of Evesham Township

==== Endorsements ====
Gaye Burton

Labor unions

- Health Professionals and Allied Employees
Janet DiFolco (eliminated)

Individuals

- Anthony Angelozzi, President of the Hammonton Education Association and nominee for New Jersey General Assembly in 2023
- Andrea Katz, Chesterfield Township Democratic Municipal Chair and nominee for New Jersey General Assembly in 2023

Democratic primary
Party	Candidate	Votes	%
Democratic	Heather Cooper	8,258	100.0
Total votes		8,258	100.0

=== General election ===
==== Predictions ====
Source	Ranking	As of
Elections Daily	Lean R	October 22, 2023
New Jersey Globe	Likely R	November 2, 2023

==== Results ====
8th Legislative District General Election, 2023
Party	Candidate	Votes	%
Republican	Latham Tiver	28,394	51.0
Democratic	Gaye Burton	27,236	49.0
Total votes		55,630	100.0
Republican hold			

== District 9 ==
The incumbent is Republican Christopher J. Connors who was re-elected with 69.40% of the vote in 2021 and will not be seeking re-election. Donald Trump won this district with 62.16% in 2020.

=== Republican primary ===
==== Nominee ====
- Carmen Amato, Mayor of Berkeley Township

==== Declined ====
- John Bacchione, Berkeley Township Councilmember
- James Byrnes, Berkeley Township Councilmember (ran for State Assembly)
- Christopher J. Connors, incumbent state senator
- Ray Gormley, Little Egg Harbor Township Committeemember
- DiAnne Gove, New Jersey General Assemblymember from the 8th district (2009–present) (endorsed Amato; ran for re-election)
- John P. Kelly, Director of the Ocean County Board of Commissioners and former mayor of Eagleswood Township
- Greg Myhre, Mayor of Stafford Township (running for State Assembly)
- John Novak, former mayor of Barnegat Township (ran for State Assembly)
- Brian E. Rumpf, New Jersey General Assemblymember from the 8th district (2003–present) (endorsed Amato; running for re-election)

==== Endorsements ====
Carmen Amato

State legislators

- DiAnne Gove, New Jersey General Assemblymember from the 9th district (2009–present)
- Brian E. Rumpf, New Jersey General Assemblymember from the 9th district (2003–present)

Labor unions

- New Jersey AFL-CIO
- New Jersey State Policemen’s Benevolent Association
- New Jersey Firefighters Mutual Benevolent Association

Organizations

- National Federation of Independent Business
- NRA Political Victory Fund
- NEW JOBS PAC

==== Results ====
Republican primary
Party	Candidate	Votes	%
Republican	Carmen Amato	11,660	100.0
Total votes		11,660	100.0

=== Democratic primary ===
==== Nominee ====
- Gabriel Franco, Little Egg Harbor Township Democratic Municipal Chair

==== Endorsements ====
Gabriel Franco

Labor unions

- Health Professionals and Allied Employees

Organizations

- New Jersey League of Conservation Voters
- Planned Parenthood Action Fund
- Freethought Equality Fund PAC

==== Results ====
Democratic primary
Party	Candidate	Votes	%
Democratic	Gabriel Franco	6,944	100.0
Total votes		6,944	100.0

=== General election ===
==== Predictions ====
Source	Ranking	As of
Elections Daily	Safe R	October 22, 2023
New Jersey Globe	Solid R	November 2, 2023

==== Results ====
9th Legislative District General Election, 2023
Party	Candidate	Votes	%
Republican	Carmen F. Amato Jr.	38,124	67.9
Democratic	Gabriel Franco	17,986	32.1
Total votes		56,110	100.0
Republican hold			

== District 10 ==
The incumbent is Republican Jim Holzapfel who was re-elected with 68.99% of the vote in 2021. Donald Trump won this district with 60.34% in 2020.

=== Republican primary ===
==== Nominee ====
- Jim Holzapfel, incumbent state senator

==== Endorsements ====
Jim Holzapfel (incumbent)

Labor unions

- New Jersey State Policemen’s Benevolent Association

Organizations

- National Federation of Independent Business
- NEW JOBS PAC

==== Results ====
Republican primary
Party	Candidate	Votes	%
Republican	Jim Holzapfel (incumbent)	11,274	100.0
Total votes		11,274	100.0

=== Democratic primary ===
==== Nominee ====
- Jeff Horn, Toms River Democratic Municipal Chair

==== Results ====
Democratic primary
Party	Candidate	Votes	%
Democratic	Jeff Horn	5,297	100.0
Total votes		5,297	100.0

=== General election ===
==== Predictions ====
Source	Ranking	As of
Elections Daily	Safe R	October 22, 2023
New Jersey Globe	Solid R	November 2, 2023

==== Results ====
10th Legislative District General Election, 2023
Party	Candidate	Votes	%
Republican	Jim Holzapfel (incumbent)	35,788	66.6
Democratic	Jeff J. Horn	17,981	33.4
Total votes		53,769	100.0
Republican hold			

== District 11 ==
The incumbent is Democrat Vin Gopal who was re-elected with 51.88% of the vote in 2021. Joe Biden won this district with 56.18% in 2020.

=== Democratic primary ===
==== Nominee ====
- Vin Gopal, incumbent state senator

==== Endorsements ====
Vin Gopal (incumbent)

Labor unions

- New Jersey AFL-CIO
- New Jersey State Policemen’s Benevolent Association
- New Jersey Firefighters Mutual Benevolent Association
- Health Professionals and Allied Employees
- SEIU 32BJ

Organizations

- National Federation of Independent Business
- New Jersey League of Conservation Voters
- Planned Parenthood Action Fund
- NEW JOBS PAC
- New Jersey Political Action for Candidate Election PAC
- Sierra Club of New Jersey

==== Results ====
Democratic primary
Party	Candidate	Votes	%
Democratic	Vin Gopal (incumbent)	8,286	100.0
Total votes		8,286	100.0

=== Republican primary ===
==== Nominee ====
- Steve Dnistrian, former COO of Omnicom

==== Withdrawn ====
- Sara Haleva, business owner

==== Declined ====
- Tom Arnone, Director of the Monmouth County Board of Commissioners
- Kimberly Eulner, New Jersey General Assemblymember from the 11th district (2022–present) (running for re-election)
- Christine Hanlon, Monmouth County Clerk
- Marilyn Piperno, New Jersey General Assemblymember from the 11th district (2022–present) (running for re-election)
- Frank Rizzuto, Colts Neck Township Committeemember
- Brian J. Thomas, President of the Neptune City Council

==== Convention results ====
Monmouth County Republican convention
Party	Candidate	Votes	%
Republican	Steve Dnistrian	85	82.5%
Republican	Sara Haleva	18	17.5%
Total votes		103	100.0%

==== Primary results ====
Republican primary
Party	Candidate	Votes	%
Republican	Steve Dnistrian	4,266	100.0
Total votes		4,266	100.0

=== General election ===
==== Predictions ====
Source	Ranking	As of
Elections Daily	Lean D	October 22, 2023
New Jersey Globe	Tossup	November 2, 2023

==== Results ====
11th Legislative District General Election, 2023
Party	Candidate	Votes	%
Democratic	Vin Gopal (incumbent)	34,350	60.3
Republican	Steve Dnistrian	22,172	38.9
NJ Patriot	Karen Zaletel	439	0.8
Total votes		56,961	100.0
Democratic hold			

== District 12 ==
Incumbent Democrat Samuel D. Thompson was re-elected as a Republican with 64.94% of the vote in 2021. He switched parties in February 2023. Donald Trump won this district with 56.48% of the vote in 2020.

=== Republican primary ===
==== Nominee ====
- Owen Henry, Mayor of Old Bridge Township

==== Endorsements ====
Owen Henry

Organizations

- NEW JOBS PAC

==== Results ====
Republican primary
Party	Candidate	Votes	%
Republican	Owen Henry	6,065	100.0
Total votes		6,065	100.0

=== Democratic primary ===
==== Nominee ====
- Brandon Rose, member of the New Jersey State Parole Board

==== Withdrawn ====
- Samuel D. Thompson, incumbent state senator

==== Endorsements ====
Brandon Rose

Labor unions

- New Jersey AFL-CIO
- Health Professionals and Allied Employees

Organizations

- Planned Parenthood Action Fund

==== Results ====
Democratic primary
Party	Candidate	Votes	%
Democratic	Brandon Rose	4,998	100.0
Total votes		4,998	100.0

=== General election ===
==== Predictions ====
Source	Ranking	As of
Elections Daily	Safe R (flip)	October 22, 2023
New Jersey Globe	Solid R (flip)	November 2, 2023

==== Results ====
12th Legislative District General Election, 2023
Party	Candidate	Votes	%
Republican	Owen Henry	28,038	62.2
Democratic	Brandon A. Rose	16,265	36.1
Results Not Politics	Nina Jochnowitz	806	1.8
Total votes		45,109	100.0
Republican gain from Democratic			

== District 13 ==
The incumbent is Republican Declan O'Scanlon who was re-elected with 61.45% of the vote in 2021. Donald Trump won this district with 52.82% in 2020.

=== Republican primary ===
==== Nominee ====
- Declan O'Scanlon, incumbent state senator

==== Endorsements ====
Declan O'Scanlon (incumbent)

Labor unions

- New Jersey State Policemen’s Benevolent Association

Organizations

- National Federation of Independent Business
- NRA Political Victory Fund
- Sierra Club of New Jersey
- NEW JOBS PAC
- New Jersey Political Action for Candidate Election PAC

==== Results ====
Republican primary
Party	Candidate	Votes	%
Republican	Declan O'Scanlon (incumbent)	6,453	100.0
Total votes		6,453	100.0

=== Democratic primary ===
==== Nominee ====
- Lucille Lo Sapio, candidate for Hazlet Township Committee

==== Endorsements ====
Lucille Lo Sapio

Labor unions

- Health Professionals and Allied Employees

Organizations

- Planned Parenthood Action Fund

==== Results ====
Democratic primary
Party	Candidate	Votes	%
Democratic	Lucille Lo Sapio	5,354	100.0
Total votes		5,354	100.0

=== General election ===
==== Predictions ====
Source	Ranking	As of
Elections Daily	Safe R	October 22, 2023
New Jersey Globe	Solid R	November 2, 2023

==== Results ====
13th Legislative District General Election, 2023
Party	Candidate	Votes	%
Republican	Declan O'Scanlon (incumbent)	31,750	58.8
Democratic	Lucille Lo Sapio	22,236	41.2
Total votes		53,986	100.0
Republican hold			

== District 14 ==
The incumbent is Democrat Linda R. Greenstein who was re-elected with 55.16% of the vote in 2021. Joe Biden won this district with 58.69% in 2020.

=== Democratic primary ===
==== Nominee ====
- Linda R. Greenstein, incumbent state senator

==== Declined ====
- Wayne DeAngelo, New Jersey General Assemblymember from the 14th district (2008–present) (endorsed Greenstein; running for re-election)

==== Endorsements ====
Linda R. Greenstein (incumbent)

State legislators

- Wayne DeAngelo, New Jersey General Assemblymember from the 14th district (2008–present)

Labor unions

- New Jersey AFL-CIO
- New Jersey State Policemen’s Benevolent Association
- New Jersey Firefighters Mutual Benevolent Association
- Health Professionals and Allied Employees
- SEIU 32BJ

Organizations

- New Jersey League of Conservation Voters
- Planned Parenthood Action Fund
- Sierra Club of New Jersey
- NEW JOBS PAC
- New Jersey Political Action for Candidate Election PAC

==== Results ====
Democratic primary
Party	Candidate	Votes	%
Democratic	Linda R. Greenstein (incumbent)	10,665	100.0
Total votes		10,665	100.0

=== Republican primary ===
==== Nominee ====
- Pat Johnson, medical professional and nominee for New Jersey's 15th assembly district in 2021

==== Results ====
Republican primary
Party	Candidate	Votes	%
Republican	Pat Johnson	4,740	100.0
Total votes		4,740	100.0

=== General election ===
==== Predictions ====
Source	Ranking	As of
Elections Daily	Safe D	October 22, 2023
New Jersey Globe	Solid D	November 2, 2023

==== Results ====
14th Legislative District General Election, 2023
Party	Candidate	Votes	%
Democratic	Linda R. Greenstein (incumbent)	33,020	59.8
Republican	Patricia "Pat" Johnson	22,225	40.2
Total votes		55,245	100.0
Democratic hold			

== District 15 ==
The incumbent is Democrat Shirley K. Turner who was re-elected with 72.18% of the vote in 2021. Joe Biden won this district with 73.29% in 2020.

=== Democratic primary ===
==== Nominee ====
- Shirley K. Turner, incumbent state senator

==== Endorsements ====
Shirley Turner (incumbent)

Labor unions

- New Jersey AFL-CIO
- New Jersey State Policemen’s Benevolent Association
- New Jersey Firefighters Mutual Benevolent Association
- Health Professionals and Allied Employees
- SEIU 32BJ

Organizations

- National Federation of Independent Business
- New Jersey League of Conservation Voters
- Planned Parenthood Action Fund
- Sierra Club of New Jersey
- NEW JOBS PAC
- New Jersey Political Action for Candidate Election PAC

==== Results ====
Democratic primary
Party	Candidate	Votes	%
Democratic	Shirley K. Turner (incumbent)	10,314	100.0
Total votes		10,314	100.0

=== Republican primary ===
==== Nominee ====
- Roger Locandro, former mayor of Delaware Township

==== Results ====
Republican primary
Party	Candidate	Votes	%
Republican	Roger Locandro	2,354	100.0
Total votes		2,354	100.0

=== General election ===
==== Predictions ====
Source	Ranking	As of
Elections Daily	Safe D	October 22, 2023
New Jersey Globe	Solid D	November 2, 2023

==== Results ====
15th Legislative District General Election, 2023
Party	Candidate	Votes	%
Democratic	Shirley K. Turner (incumbent)	27,760	73.2
Republican	Roger R. Locandro	10,173	26.8
Total votes		37,933	100.0
Democratic hold			

== District 16 ==
The incumbent is Democrat Andrew Zwicker who was elected with 53.32% of the vote in 2021. Joe Biden won this district with 59.64% in 2020.

=== Democratic primary ===
==== Nominee ====
- Andrew Zwicker, incumbent state senator

==== Endorsements ====
Andrew Zwicker (incumbent)

Labor unions

- New Jersey AFL-CIO
- New Jersey State Policemen’s Benevolent Association
- New Jersey Firefighters Mutual Benevolent Association
- Health Professionals and Allied Employees
- SEIU 32BJ

Organizations

- New Jersey League of Conservation Voters
- Planned Parenthood Action Fund
- Sierra Club of New Jersey
- NEW JOBS PAC
- New Jersey Political Action for Candidate Election PAC
- Freethought Equality Fund PAC

==== Results ====
Democratic primary
Party	Candidate	Votes	%
Democratic	Andrew Zwicker (incumbent)	10,058	100.0
Total votes		10,058	100.0

=== Republican primary ===
==== Nominee ====
- Michael Pappas, former U.S. representative from New Jersey's 12th congressional district (1997–1999) and nominee for this seat in 2021

==== Results ====
Republican primary
Party	Candidate	Votes	%
Republican	Michael Pappas	6,155	100.0
Total votes		6,155	100.0

=== General election ===
==== Predictions ====
Source	Ranking	As of
Elections Daily	Lean D	October 22, 2023
New Jersey Globe	Lean D	November 2, 2023

==== Results ====
16th Legislative District General Election, 2023
Party	Candidate	Votes	%
Democratic	Andrew Zwicker (incumbent)	34,693	56.5
Republican	Michael Pappas	25,839	42.0
Libertarian	Richard J. Byrne	922	1.5
Total votes		61,454	100.0
Democratic hold			

== District 17 ==
The incumbent is Democrat Bob Smith who was re-elected with 69.11% of the vote in 2021. Joe Biden won this district with 72.43% in 2020.

=== Democratic primary ===
==== Nominee ====
- Bob Smith, incumbent state senator

==== Endorsements ====
Bob Smith (incumbent)

Labor unions

- New Jersey AFL-CIO
- New Jersey State Policemen’s Benevolent Association
- New Jersey Firefighters Mutual Benevolent Association
- Health Professionals and Allied Employees
- SEIU 32BJ

Organizations

- New Jersey League of Conservation Voters
- Planned Parenthood Action Fund
- Sierra Club of New Jersey
- New Jersey Education Association PAC
- New Jersey Political Action for Candidate Election PAC

==== Results ====
Democratic primary
Party	Candidate	Votes	%
Democratic	Bob Smith (incumbent)	9,189	100.0
Total votes		9,189	100.0

=== Republican primary ===
==== Nominee ====
- William P. Mikita Jr.

==== Results ====
Republican primary
Party	Candidate	Votes	%
Republican	William P. Mikita Jr.	1,734	100.0
Total votes		1,734	100.0

=== General election ===
==== Predictions ====
Source	Ranking	As of
Elections Daily	Safe D	October 22, 2023
New Jersey Globe	Solid D	November 2, 2023

==== Results ====
17th Legislative District General Election, 2023
Party	Candidate	Votes	%
Democratic	Bob Smith (incumbent)	20,643	72.8
Republican	William P. Mikita Jr.	7,718	27.2
Total votes		28,361	100.0
Democratic hold			

== District 18 ==
The incumbent is Democrat Patrick J. Diegnan who was re-elected with 60.63% of the vote in 2021. Joe Biden won this district with 60.48% in 2020.

=== Democratic primary ===
==== Nominee ====
- Patrick J. Diegnan, incumbent state senator

==== Eliminated in primary ====
- Christopher Binetti, professor

==== Endorsements ====
Patrick Diegnan (incumbent)

Labor unions

- New Jersey AFL-CIO
- New Jersey State Policemen’s Benevolent Association
- New Jersey Firefighters Mutual Benevolent Association
- Health Professionals and Allied Employees
- SEIU 32BJ

Organizations

- New Jersey League of Conservation Voters
- Planned Parenthood Action Fund
- Sierra Club of New Jersey
- NEW JOBS PAC
- New Jersey Political Action for Candidate Election PAC
- New Jersey Education Association PAC

==== Results ====
Democratic primary
Party	Candidate	Votes	%
Democratic	Patrick J. Diegnan (incumbent)	13,186	89.0
Democratic	Christopher Binetti	1,630	11.0
Total votes		14,816	100.0

=== Republican primary ===
==== Nominee ====
- Neal Shah

==== Results ====
Republican primary
Party	Candidate	Votes	%
Republican	Neal Shah	3,076	100.0
Total votes		3,076	100.0

=== General election ===
==== Predictions ====
Source	Ranking	As of
Elections Daily	Safe D	October 22, 2023
New Jersey Globe	Solid D	November 2, 2023

==== Results ====
18th Legislative District General Election, 2023
Party	Candidate	Votes	%
Democratic	Patrick J. Diegnan Jr. (incumbent)	24,294	64.0
Republican	Neal Shah	13,661	36.0
Total votes		37,955	100.0
Democratic hold			

== District 19 ==
The incumbent is Democrat Joseph F. Vitale who was re-elected with 59.90% of the vote in 2021. Joe Biden won this district with 59.16% in 2020.

=== Democratic primary ===
==== Nominee ====
- Joseph F. Vitale, incumbent state senator

==== Eliminated in primary ====
- Michelle Burwell, former New Jersey Department of Children and Families Supervisor

==== Endorsements ====
Joseph Vitale (incumbent)

Labor unions

- New Jersey AFL-CIO
- New Jersey State Policemen’s Benevolent Association
- New Jersey Firefighters Mutual Benevolent Association
- Health Professionals and Allied Employees
- SEIU 32BJ

Organizations

- Planned Parenthood Action Fund
- Sierra Club of New Jersey
- NEW JOBS PAC
- New Jersey Education Association PAC
- New Jersey Political Action for Candidate Election PAC

==== Results ====
Democratic primary
Party	Candidate	Votes	%
Democratic	Joseph F. Vitale (incumbent)	7,801	85.90
Democratic	Michelle Burwell	1,281	14.10
Total votes		9,082	100.0

=== Republican primary ===
==== Nominee ====
- Maria Garcia

==== Results ====
Republican primary
Party	Candidate	Votes	%
Republican	Maria Garcia	2,450	100.0
Total votes		2,450	100.0

=== General election ===
==== Predictions ====
Source	Ranking	As of
Elections Daily	Safe D	October 22, 2023
New Jersey Globe	Solid D	November 2, 2023

==== Results ====
19th Legislative District General Election, 2023
Party	Candidate	Votes	%
Democratic	Joseph F. Vitale (incumbent)	19,571	63.2
Republican	Maria Garcia	11,392	36.8
Total votes		30,963	100.0
Democratic hold			

== District 20 ==
The incumbent is Democrat Joseph Cryan who was re-elected unopposed in 2021. Joe Biden won this district with 71.03% in 2020.

=== Democratic primary ===
==== Nominee ====
- Joseph Cryan, incumbent state senator

==== Eliminated in primary ====
- Angela Alvey-Wimbush, Roselle Board of Education member

==== Endorsements ====
Joseph Cryan (incumbent)

Labor unions

- New Jersey AFL-CIO
- New Jersey State Policemen’s Benevolent Association
- New Jersey Firefighters Mutual Benevolent Association
- Health Professionals and Allied Employees
- SEIU 32BJ

Organizations

- Planned Parenthood Action Fund
- Sierra Club of New Jersey
- New Jersey Political Action for Candidate Election PAC

==== Results ====
Democratic primary
Party	Candidate	Votes	%
Democratic	Joseph Cryan (incumbent)	6,798	73.9
Democratic	Angela Alvey-Wimbush	2,402	26.1
Total votes		9,200	100.0

=== Republican primary ===
==== Nominee ====
- Carmen Bucco, candidate for Union County Commissioner

==== Results ====
Republican primary
Party	Candidate	Votes	%
Republican	Carmen Bucco	1,011	100.0
Total votes		1,011	100.0

=== General election ===
==== Predictions ====
Source	Ranking	As of
Elections Daily	Safe D	October 22, 2023
New Jersey Globe	Solid D	November 2, 2023

==== Results ====
20th Legislative District General Election, 2023
Party	Candidate	Votes	%
Democratic	Joseph Cryan (incumbent)	12,473	74.7
Republican	Carmen Bucco	4,224	25.3
Total votes		16,697	100.0
Democratic hold			

== District 21 ==
The incumbent is Republican Jon Bramnick who was elected with 53.65% of the vote in 2021 after serving 20 years in the New Jersey State Assembly. Joe Biden won this district with 58.07% in 2020.

=== Republican primary ===
==== Nominee ====
- Jon Bramnick, incumbent state senator

==== Endorsements ====
Jon Bramnick (incumbent)

Labor unions

- New Jersey AFL-CIO
- New Jersey State Policemen’s Benevolent Association

Organizations

- National Federation of Independent Business
- NEW JOBS PAC
- New Jersey Political Action for Candidate Election PAC

==== Results ====
Republican primary
Party	Candidate	Votes	%
Republican	Jon Bramnick (incumbent)	8,945	100.0
Total votes		8,945	100.0

=== Democratic primary ===
==== Nominee ====
- Matt Marino, former Bernardsville Councilman (appointed), former Catholic school teacher, regulatory compliance officer, actor, and local peach expert.

==== Endorsements ====
Matt Marino

Labor unions

- Health Professionals and Allied Employees

Organizations

- Planned Parenthood Action Fund

==== Results ====
Democratic primary
Party	Candidate	Votes	%
Democratic	Matt Marino	8,628	100.0
Total votes		8,628	100.0

=== General election ===
==== Predictions ====
Source	Ranking	As of
Elections Daily	Lean R	October 22, 2023
New Jersey Globe	Likely R	November 2, 2023

==== Results ====
21st Legislative District General Election, 2023
Party	Candidate	Votes	%
Republican	Jon Bramnick (incumbent)	34,435	53.5
Democratic	Matt Marino	29,948	46.5
Total votes		64,383	100.0
Republican hold			

== District 22 ==
The incumbent is Democrat Nicholas P. Scutari who was re-elected with 61.45% of the vote in 2021. Joe Biden won this district with 67.26% in 2020.

=== Democratic primary ===
==== Nominee ====
- Nicholas P. Scutari, incumbent state senator

==== Endorsements ====
Nicolas Scutari (incumbent)

Labor unions

- New Jersey AFL-CIO
- New Jersey State Policemen’s Benevolent Association
- New Jersey Firefighters Mutual Benevolent Association
- Health Professionals and Allied Employees
- SEIU 32BJ

Organizations

- New Jersey League of Conservation Voters
- Planned Parenthood Action Fund
- Sierra Club of New Jersey
- NEW JOBS PAC
- New Jersey Political Action for Candidate Election PAC

==== Results ====
Democratic primary
Party	Candidate	Votes	%
Democratic	Nicholas P. Scutari (incumbent)	10,012	100.0
Total votes		10,012	100.0

=== Republican primary ===
==== Nominee ====
- William H. Michelson, Plainfield Republican Municipal Chair

==== Results ====
Republican primary
Party	Candidate	Votes	%
Republican	William H. Michelson	2,376	100.0
Total votes		2,376	100.0

=== General election ===
==== Predictions ====
Source	Ranking	As of
Elections Daily	Safe D	October 22, 2023
New Jersey Globe	Solid D	November 2, 2023

==== Results ====
22nd Legislative District General Election, 2023
Party	Candidate	Votes	%
Democratic	Nicholas P. Scutari (incumbent)	23,876	66.2
Republican	William H. Michelson	12,189	33.8
Total votes		36,065	100.0
Democratic hold			

== District 23 ==
The incumbent is Republican Doug Steinhardt who was elected to the seat unopposed at a special convention in December 2022. Donald Trump won this district with 51.92% in 2020.

=== Republican primary ===
==== Nominee ====
- Doug Steinhardt, incumbent senator

==== Endorsements ====
Doug Steinhardt

Labor unions

- New Jersey State Policemen’s Benevolent Association

Organizations

- NRA Political Victory Fund
- NEW JOBS PAC

==== Results ====
Republican primary
Party	Candidate	Votes	%
Republican	Doug Steinhardt (incumbent)	8,722	100.0
Total votes		8,722	100.0

=== Democratic primary ===
==== Nominee ====
- Denise King, nominee for this seat in 2021 and nominee for New Jersey's 23rd assembly district in 2019

==== Eliminated in primary ====
- Roger Bacon, perennial candidate

==== Endorsements ====
Denise King

Labor unions

- Health Professionals and Allied Employees

Organizations

- Planned Parenthood Action Fund
- Sierra Club of New Jersey

==== Results ====
Democratic primary
Party	Candidate	Votes	%
Democratic	Denise King	6,685	93.2
Democratic	Roger Bacon	488	6.8
Total votes		7,173	100.0

=== General election ===
==== Predictions ====
Source	Ranking	As of
Elections Daily	Safe R	October 22, 2023
New Jersey Globe	Solid R	November 2, 2023

==== Results ====
23rd Legislative District General Election, 2023
Party	Candidate	Votes	%
Republican	Douglas Steinhardt (incumbent)	31,066	57.7
Democratic	Denise King	22,790	42.3
Total votes		53,856	100.0
Republican hold			

== District 24 ==
The incumbent is Republican Steve Oroho who was re-elected with 69.37% of the vote in 2021 and will not be seeking re-election. Donald Trump won this district with 56.17% in 2020.

=== Republican primary ===
==== Nominee ====
- Parker Space, New Jersey General Assemblymember from the 24th district (2013–present)

==== Withdrawn ====
- Steve Lonegan, former mayor of Bogota (1996–2007), candidate for New Jersey's 5th congressional district in 2018, candidate for New Jersey's 3rd congressional district in 2014, nominee for U.S. Senate in 2013, and candidate for Governor of New Jersey in 2005 and 2009 (previously filed to run for State Assembly)
- Steve Oroho, incumbent state senator (endorsed Space)

==== Endorsements ====
Parker Space

State legislators

- Steve Oroho, Minority Leader of the New Jersey Senate (2022–present) and New Jersey State Senator from the New Jersey's 24th legislative district (2008–present)
- Hal Wirths, New Jersey General Assemblymember from the New Jersey's 24th legislative district (2018–present)

Labor unions

- New Jersey State Policemen’s Benevolent Association

Organizations

- National Federation of Independent Business
- NRA Political Victory Fund

==== Convention results ====
Morris County Republican convention
Party	Candidate	Votes	%
Republican	Parker Space	80	85.1%
Republican	Steve Lonegan	14	14.9%
Total votes		94	100.0%

==== Primary results ====
Republican primary
Party	Candidate	Votes	%
Republican	Parker Space	15,042	100.0
Total votes		15,042	100.0

=== Democratic primary ===
==== Nominee ====
- Edmund Khanoo, finance executive for Planned Parenthood

==== Endorsements ====
Edmund Khanoo

Organizations

- Planned Parenthood Action Fund

==== Results ====
Democratic primary
Party	Candidate	Votes	%
Democratic	Edmund Khanoo	5,727	100.0
Total votes		5,727	100.0

=== General election ===
==== Predictions ====
Source	Ranking	As of
Elections Daily	Safe R	October 22, 2023
New Jersey Globe	Solid R	November 2, 2023

==== Results ====
24th Legislative District General Election, 2023
Party	Candidate	Votes	%
Republican	Parker Space	33,604	64.1
Democratic	Edmund Khanoo	18,821	35.9
Total votes		52,425	100.0
Republican hold			

== District 25 ==
The incumbent is Republican Anthony M. Bucco who was re-elected with 57.47% of the vote in 2021. Joe Biden won this district with 52.52% in 2020.

=== Republican primary ===
==== Nominee ====
- Anthony M. Bucco, incumbent state senator

==== Endorsements ====
Anthony Bucco (incumbent)

Labor unions

- New Jersey AFL-CIO
- New Jersey State Policemen’s Benevolent Association
- New Jersey Firefighters Mutual Benevolent Association

Organizations

- National Federation of Independent Business
- NRA Political Victory Fund
- NEW JOBS PAC

==== Results ====
Republican primary
Party	Candidate	Votes	%
Republican	Anthony M. Bucco (incumbent)	9,747	100.0
Total votes		9,747	100.0

=== Democratic primary ===
==== Nominee ====
- Christine Clarke, environmental activist

==== Endorsements ====
Christine Clarke

Labor unions

- Health Professionals and Allied Employees
- SEIU 32BJ

Organizations

- Freethought Equality Fund PAC
- Jane Fonda Climate PAC
- New Jersey League of Conservation Voters
- Planned Parenthood Action Fund
- Sierra Club of New Jersey

==== Results ====
Democratic primary
Party	Candidate	Votes	%
Democratic	Christine Clarke	8,198	100.0
Total votes		8,198	100.0

=== General election ===
==== Predictions ====
Source	Ranking	As of
Elections Daily	Likely R	October 22, 2023
New Jersey Globe	Likely R	November 2, 2023

==== Results ====
25th Legislative District General Election, 2023
Party	Candidate	Votes	%
Republican	Anthony M. Bucco (incumbent)	27,250	52.7
Democratic	Christine Clarke	24,491	47.3
Total votes		51,741	100.0
Republican hold			

== District 26 ==
The incumbent is Republican Joe Pennacchio who was re-elected with 58.94% of the vote in 2021. Donald Trump won this district with 50.02% in 2020.

=== Republican primary ===
==== Nominee ====
- Joe Pennacchio, incumbent state senator

==== Eliminated in primary ====
- Tom Mastrangelo, Morris County Commissioner and candidate for New Jersey's 26th assembly district in 2021

==== Endorsements ====
Joe Pennacchio (incumbent)

Labor unions

- New Jersey State Policemen’s Benevolent Association
- New Jersey Firefighters Mutual Benevolent Association

Organizations

- National Federation of Independent Business
- NRA Political Victory Fund
- NEW JOBS PAC

==== Convention results ====
Morris County Republican convention
Party	Candidate	Votes	%
Republican	Joe Pennacchio (incumbent)	174	77.0
Republican	Tom Mastrangelo	52	23.0
Total votes		226	100.0

==== Primary results ====
Republican primary
Party	Candidate	Votes	%
Republican	Joe Pennacchio (incumbent)	9,012	59.59
Republican	Tom Mastrangelo	6,111	40.41
Total votes		15,123	100.0

=== Democratic primary ===
==== Nominee ====
- Joan Waks, nominee for New Jersey's 34th assembly district in 1995 and nominee for New Jersey's 34th senate district in 1997

==== Results ====
Democratic primary
Party	Candidate	Votes	%
Democratic	Joan Waks	6,908	100.0
Total votes		6,908	100.0

=== General election ===
==== Predictions ====
Source	Ranking	As of
Elections Daily	Safe R	October 22, 2023
New Jersey Globe	Solid R	November 2, 2023

==== Results ====
26th Legislative District General Election, 2023
Party	Candidate	Votes	%
Republican	Joseph Pennacchio (incumbent)	28,313	56.8
Democratic	Joan Waks	21,571	43.2
Total votes		49,884	100.0
Republican hold			

== District 27 ==
The incumbent is Democrat Richard Codey who was re-elected with 64.87% of the vote in 2021 and is not seeking reelection. Joe Biden won this district with 70.61% in 2020.

=== Democratic primary ===
==== Nominee ====
- John F. McKeon, New Jersey General Assemblymember from the 27th district (2002–present)

==== Eliminated in primary ====
- Nia H. Gill, incumbent senator from the 34th district

==== Withdrawn ====
- Richard Codey, incumbent state senator

==== Declined ====
- Thomas P. Giblin, New Jersey General Assemblymember from the 34th district (2006–present)
- Brendan Gill, Essex County Commissioner (ran for State Assembly)
- Sean Spiller, Mayor of Montclair (2020–present)

==== Endorsements ====
John McKeon

Labor unions

- New Jersey AFL-CIO
- New Jersey State Policemen’s Benevolent Association
- New Jersey Firefighters Mutual Benevolent Association
- Health Professionals and Allied Employees
- SEIU 32BJ

Organizations

- Planned Parenthood Action Fund
- Sierra Club of New Jersey
- NEW JOBS PAC

==== Results ====
Democratic primary
Party	Candidate	Votes	%
Democratic	Richard J. Codey (incumbent)	8,148	57.51
Democratic	Nia H. Gill (incumbent)	6,021	42.49
Total votes		14,169	100.0

=== Republican primary ===
Republican primary
Party	Candidate	Votes	%
Republican	Michael D. Byrne (write-in)	182	83.9
Republican	Other write-ins	35	16.1
Total votes		217	100.0

=== General election ===
==== Predictions ====
Source	Ranking	As of
Elections Daily	Safe D	October 22, 2023
New Jersey Globe	Solid D	November 2, 2023

==== Results ====
27th Legislative District General Election, 2023
Party	Candidate	Votes	%
Democratic	John F. McKeon	28,499	71.1
Republican	Michael D. Byrne	11,566	28.9
Total votes		40,065	100.0
Democratic hold			

== District 28 ==
The incumbent is Democrat Renee Burgess who was chosen to fill the seat after Ron Rice stepped down due to health issues. Joe Biden won this district with 92.07% in 2020.

=== Democratic primary ===
==== Nominee ====
- Renee Burgess, incumbent state senator

==== Endorsements ====
Renee Burgess (incumbent)

Labor unions

- New Jersey AFL-CIO
- New Jersey State Policemen’s Benevolent Association
- New Jersey Firefighters Mutual Benevolent Association
- Health Professionals and Allied Employees
- SEIU 32BJ

Organizations

- Planned Parenthood Action Fund

==== Results ====
Democratic primary
Party	Candidate	Votes	%
Democratic	Renee Burgess (incumbent)	10,449	100.0
Total votes		10,449	100.0

=== General election ===
==== Predictions ====
Source	Ranking	As of
Elections Daily	Safe D	October 22, 2023
New Jersey Globe	Solid D	November 2, 2023

==== Results ====
28th Legislative District General Election, 2023
Party	Candidate	Votes	%
Democratic	Renee C. Burgess (incumbent)	19,638	100.0
Total votes		19,638	100.0
Democratic hold			

== District 29 ==
The incumbent is Democrat M. Teresa Ruiz who was re-elected unopposed in 2021. Joe Biden who this district with 80.82% in 2020.

=== Democratic primary ===
==== Nominee ====
- M. Teresa Ruiz, incumbent state senator

==== Endorsements ====
Teresa Ruiz (incumbent)

Labor unions

- New Jersey AFL-CIO
- New Jersey State Policemen’s Benevolent Association
- New Jersey Firefighters Mutual Benevolent Association
- SEIU 32BJ

Organizations

- Planned Parenthood Action Fund
- Sierra Club of New Jersey
- NEW JOBS PAC
- New Jersey Political Action for Candidate Election PAC

==== Results ====
Democratic primary
Party	Candidate	Votes	%
Democratic	M. Teresa Ruiz (incumbent)	4,127	100.0
Total votes		4,127	100.0

=== Republican primary ===
==== Nominee ====
- Maritza Mathews

==== Results ====
Republican primary
Party	Candidate	Votes	%
Republican	Maritza Mathews	256	100.0
Total votes		256	100.0

=== General election ===
==== Predictions ====
Source	Ranking	As of
Elections Daily	Safe D	October 22, 2023
New Jersey Globe	Solid D	November 2, 2023

==== Results ====
29th Legislative District General Election, 2023
Party	Candidate	Votes	%
Democratic	M. Teresa Ruiz (incumbent)	7,766	83.5
Republican	Maritza Mathews	1,351	14.5
Labour	Pablo Olivera	181	1.9
Total votes		9,298	100.0
Democratic hold			

== District 30 ==
The incumbent is Republican Robert W. Singer who was re-elected with 71.19% of the vote in 2021. Donald Trump won this district with 67.27% in 2020.

=== Republican primary ===
==== Nominee ====
- Robert W. Singer, incumbent state senator

==== Endorsements ====
Robert Singer (incumbent)

Labor unions

- New Jersey AFL-CIO
- New Jersey State Policemen’s Benevolent Association

Organizations

- National Federation of Independent Business
- Sierra Club of New Jersey
- NRA Political Victory Fund
- NEW JOBS PAC

==== Results ====
Republican primary
Party	Candidate	Votes	%
Republican	Robert W. Singer (incumbent)	3,908	100.0
Total votes		3,908	100.0

=== Democratic primary ===
==== Nominee ====
- Stephen Dobbins, businessman and candidate for New Jersey's 30th assembly district in 2021

==== Results ====
Democratic primary
Party	Candidate	Votes	%
Democratic	Stephen Dobbins	2,600	100.0
Total votes		2,600	100.0

=== General election ===
==== Predictions ====
Source	Ranking	As of
Elections Daily	Safe R	October 22, 2023
New Jersey Globe	Solid R	November 2, 2023

==== Results ====
30th Legislative District General Election, 2023
Party	Candidate	Votes	%
Republican	Robert W. Singer (incumbent)	37,998	80.6
Democratic	Stephen Dobbins	9,123	19.4
Total votes		47,121	100.0
Republican hold			

== District 31 ==
The incumbent is Democrat Sandra Bolden Cunningham who was re-elected with 75.28% of the vote in 2021 and is not seeking re-election. Joe Biden won this district with 72.12% in 2020.

=== Democratic primary ===
==== Nominee ====
- Angela V. McKnight, New Jersey General Assemblymember from the 31st district (2016–present)

==== Eliminated in primary ====
- Michael Griffin, activist

==== Declined ====
- Sandra Bolden Cunningham, incumbent state senator
- Bill O'Dea, Hudson County Commissioner
- Denise Ridley, Jersey City Councilmember
- Jerry Walker, Hudson County Commissioner
- Joyce Watterman, Jersey City Council President

==== Endorsements ====
Angela V. McKnight

Local officials

- Steven Fulop, Mayor of Jersey City (2013–present)

Labor unions

- New Jersey AFL-CIO
- New Jersey Firefighters Mutual Benevolent Association
- Health Professionals and Allied Employees
- SEIU 32BJ

Organizations

- Working Families Party
- Planned Parenthood Action Fund
- New Jersey Political Action for Candidate Election PAC

==== Results ====
Democratic primary
Party	Candidate	Votes	%
Democratic	Angela V. McKnight	8,005	75.05
Democratic	Michael Griffin	2,661	24.95
Total votes		10,666	100.0

=== Republican primary ===
==== Nominee ====
- Luis Soto, businessman

==== Results ====
Republican primary
Party	Candidate	Votes	%
Republican	Luis Soto	1,073	100.0
Total votes		1,073	100.0

=== General election ===
==== Predictions ====
Source	Ranking	As of
Elections Daily	Safe D	October 22, 2023
New Jersey Globe	Solid D	November 2, 2023

==== Results ====
31st Legislative District General Election, 2023
Party	Candidate	Votes	%
Democratic	Angela V. McKnight	14,421	75.8
Republican	Luis Soto	4,593	24.2
Total votes		19,014	100.0
Democratic hold			

== District 32 ==
The incumbent is Democrat Nicholas Sacco who was re-elected with 71.17% of the vote in 2021. He was redistricted to the 33rd following redistricting and did not seek reelection. Joe Biden won this district with 77.86% in 2020.

=== Democratic primary ===
==== Nominee ====
- Raj Mukherji, New Jersey General Assemblymember from the 33rd district (2014–present)

==== Endorsements ====
Raj Mukherji

Statewide officials

- Phil Murphy, Governor of New Jersey (2018–present)

State legislators

- Vin Gopal, New Jersey State Senator from the 11th district (2018–present)
- Brian P. Stack, New Jersey State Senator from the 33rd district (2008–present) and Mayor of Union City (2000–present)

Local officials

- Ravinder Bhalla, Mayor of Hoboken (2018–present)
- Steven Fulop, Mayor of Jersey City (2013–present)

Labor unions

- New Jersey AFL-CIO
- New Jersey State Policemen’s Benevolent Association
- New Jersey Firefighters Mutual Benevolent Association
- Health Professionals and Allied Employees
- SEIU 32BJ

Organizations

- New Jersey League of Conservation Voters
- Planned Parenthood Action Fund
- Sierra Club of New Jersey
- NEW JOBS PAC
- New Jersey Political Action for Candidate Election PAC

==== Results ====
Democratic primary
Party	Candidate	Votes	%
Democratic	Raj Mukherji	8,882	100.0
Total votes		8,882	100.0

=== Republican primary ===
==== Nominee ====
- Ilyas Mohammed

==== Results ====
Republican primary
Party	Candidate	Votes	%
Republican	Ilyas Mohammed	723	100.0
Total votes		723	100.0

=== General election ===
==== Predictions ====
Source	Ranking	As of
Elections Daily	Safe D	October 22, 2023
New Jersey Globe	Solid D	November 2, 2023

==== Results ====
32nd Legislative District General Election, 2023
Party	Candidate	Votes	%
Democratic	Raj Mukherji	15,175	83.1
Republican	Ilyas Mohammed	3,083	16.9
Total votes		18,258	100.0
Democratic hold			

== District 33 ==
The incumbent is Democrat Brian P. Stack who was re-elected with 85.14% of the vote in 2021. Joe Biden won this district with 68.10% in 2020.

=== Democratic primary ===
==== Nominee ====
- Brian P. Stack, incumbent state senator

==== Declined ====
- Nicholas Sacco, incumbent senator from the 32nd district (endorsed Stack)

==== Endorsements ====
Brian P. Stack

Statewide officials

- Phil Murphy, Governor of New Jersey (2018–present)

State legislators

- Nicholas Sacco, New Jersey State Senator from the 32nd district (1994–present) and Mayor of North Bergen (1991–present)

Labor unions

- New Jersey AFL-CIO
- New Jersey State Policemen’s Benevolent Association
- New Jersey Firefighters Mutual Benevolent Association
- SEIU 32BJ

Organizations

- Planned Parenthood Action Fund
- Sierra Club of New Jersey
- New Jersey Political Action for Candidate Election PAC

==== Results ====
Democratic primary
Party	Candidate	Votes	%
Democratic	Brian P. Stack (incumbent)	20,319	100.0
Total votes		20,319	100.0

=== Republican primary ===
No Republicans filed.

Republican primary
Party	Candidate	Votes	%
Republican	Write-in	408	100.0
Total votes		408	100.0

=== General election ===
==== Predictions ====
Source	Ranking	As of
Elections Daily	Safe D	October 22, 2023
New Jersey Globe	Solid D	November 2, 2023

==== Results ====
33rd Legislative District General Election, 2023
Party	Candidate	Votes	%
Democratic	Brian P. Stack	27,262	97.1
Socialist Workers	Joanne Kuniansky	821	2.9
Total votes		28,083	100.0
Democratic hold			

== District 34 ==
Incumbent Democrat Nia H. Gill was re-elected with 78.73% of the vote in 2021. She was redistricted to the 27th following redistricting and defeated in the primary. Joe Biden won this district with 75.38% in 2020.

=== Democratic primary ===
==== Nominee ====
- Britnee Timberlake, New Jersey General Assemblymember from the 34th district (2018–present)

==== Endorsements ====
Britnee Timberlake

Labor unions

- New Jersey AFL-CIO
- New Jersey Firefighters Mutual Benevolent Association
- Health Professionals and Allied Employees
- SEIU 32BJ

Organizations

- New Jersey League of Conservation Voters
- Planned Parenthood Action Fund
- New Jersey Political Action for Candidate Election PAC

==== Results ====
Democratic primary
Party	Candidate	Votes	%
Democratic	Britnee Timberlake	8,768	100.0
Total votes		8,768	100.0

=== Republican primary ===
Republican primary
Party	Candidate	Votes	%
Republican	Joseph Belnome (write-in)	110	100.0
Total votes		110	100.0

=== General election ===
==== Predictions ====
Source	Ranking	As of
Elections Daily	Safe D	October 22, 2023
New Jersey Globe	Solid D	November 2, 2023

==== Results ====
34th Legislative District General Election, 2023
Party	Candidate	Votes	%
Democratic	Britnee N. Timberlake	18,677	76.1
Republican	Joseph Belnome	5,875	23.9
Total votes		24,552	100.0
Democratic hold			

== District 35 ==
The incumbent is Democrat Nelida Pou who was re-elected with 68.59% of the vote in 2021. Joe Biden won this district with 70.22% in 2020.

=== Democratic primary ===
==== Nominee ====
- Nelida Pou, incumbent state senator

==== Endorsements ====
Nelida Pou (incumbent)

Labor unions

- New Jersey AFL-CIO
- New Jersey Firefighters Mutual Benevolent Association
- SEIU 32BJ

Organizations

- Planned Parenthood Action Fund
- Sierra Club of New Jersey
- NEW JOBS PAC
- New Jersey Political Action for Candidate Election PAC
- New Jersey Education Association PAC

==== Results ====
Democratic primary
Party	Candidate	Votes	%
Democratic	Nelida Pou (incumbent)	3,707	100.0
Total votes		3,707	100.0

=== Republican primary ===
==== Nominee ====
- Christopher Faustino

==== Results ====
Republican primary
Party	Candidate	Votes	%
Republican	Christopher Faustino	988	100.0
Total votes		988	100.0

=== General election ===
==== Predictions ====
Source	Ranking	As of
Elections Daily	Safe D	October 22, 2023
New Jersey Globe	Solid D	November 2, 2023

==== Results ====
35th Legislative District General Election, 2023
Party	Candidate	Votes	%
Democratic	Nelida Pou (incumbent)	11,950	69.0
Republican	Christopher Faustino	5,365	31.0
Total votes		17,315	100.0
Democratic hold			

== District 36 ==
The incumbent is Democrat Paul A. Sarlo who was re-elected with 56.86% of the vote in 2021. Joe Biden won this district with 56.39% in 2020.

=== Democratic primary ===
==== Nominee ====
- Paul A. Sarlo, incumbent state senator

==== Endorsements ====
Paul Sarlo (incumbent)

Labor unions

- New Jersey AFL-CIO
- New Jersey State Policemen’s Benevolent Association
- New Jersey Firefighters Mutual Benevolent Association
- Health Professionals and Allied Employees
- SEIU 32BJ

Organizations

- Planned Parenthood Action Fund
- Sierra Club of New Jersey
- NEW JOBS PAC
- New Jersey Political Action for Candidate Election PAC
- New Jersey Education Association PAC

==== Results ====
Democratic primary
Party	Candidate	Votes	%
Democratic	Paul A. Sarlo (incumbent)	4,506	100.0
Total votes		4,506	100.0

=== Republican primary ===
==== Nominee ====
- Chris Auriemma, nominee for this seat in 2021

==== Results ====
Republican primary
Party	Candidate	Votes	%
Republican	Chris Auriemma	2,357	100.0
Total votes		2,357	100.0

=== General election ===
==== Predictions ====
Source	Ranking	As of
Elections Daily	Safe D	October 22, 2023
New Jersey Globe	Solid D	November 2, 2023

==== Results ====
36th Legislative District General Election, 2023
Party	Candidate	Votes	%
Democratic	Paul A. Sarlo (incumbent)	18,885	61.7
Republican	Chris Auriemma	11,744	38.3
Total votes		30,629	100.0
Democratic hold			

== District 37 ==
The incumbent is Democrat Gordon M. Johnson who was elected with 67.04% of the vote in 2021. Joe Biden won this district with 69.84% in 2020.

=== Democratic primary ===
==== Nominee ====
- Gordon M. Johnson, incumbent state senator

==== Endorsements ====
Gordon Johnson (incumbent)

Labor unions

- New Jersey AFL-CIO
- New Jersey State Policemen’s Benevolent Association
- New Jersey Firefighters Mutual Benevolent Association
- Health Professionals and Allied Employees
- SEIU 32BJ

Organizations

- New Jersey League of Conservation Voters
- Planned Parenthood Action Fund
- Sierra Club of New Jersey
- NEW JOBS PAC
- New Jersey Political Action for Candidate Election PAC
- New Jersey Education Association PAC

==== Results ====
Democratic primary
Party	Candidate	Votes	%
Democratic	Gordon M. Johnson (incumbent)	8,930	100.0
Total votes		8,930	100.0

=== Republican primary ===
==== Nominee ====
- Dierdre Paul, nominee for New Jersey's 9th congressional district in 2014

==== Results ====
Republican primary
Party	Candidate	Votes	%
Republican	Dierdre Paul	1,919	100.0
Total votes		1,919	100.0

=== General election ===
==== Predictions ====
Source	Ranking	As of
Elections Daily	Safe D	October 22, 2023
New Jersey Globe	Solid D	November 2, 2023

==== Results ====
37th Legislative District General Election, 2023
Party	Candidate	Votes	%
Democratic	Gordon M. Johnson (incumbent)	27,466	72.1
Republican	Dierdre G. Paul	10,610	27.9
Total votes		38,076	100.0
Democratic hold			

== District 38 ==
The incumbent is Democrat Joseph A. Lagana who was re-elected with 52.90% of the vote in 2021. Joe Biden won this district with 56.63% in 2020.

=== Democratic primary ===
==== Nominee ====
- Joseph A. Lagana, incumbent state senator

==== Endorsements ====
Joseph Lagana (incumbent)

Labor unions

- New Jersey AFL-CIO
- New Jersey State Policemen’s Benevolent Association
- New Jersey Firefighters Mutual Benevolent Association
- Health Professionals and Allied Employees
- SEIU 32BJ

Organizations

- New Jersey League of Conservation Voters
- Planned Parenthood Action Fund
- Sierra Club of New Jersey
- NEW JOBS PAC
- New Jersey Political Action for Candidate Election PAC
- New Jersey Education Association PAC

==== Results ====
Democratic primary
Party	Candidate	Votes	%
Democratic	Joseph A. Lagana (incumbent)	6,451	100.0
Total votes		6,451	100.0

=== Republican primary ===
==== Nominee ====
- Micheline Attieh, businesswoman

==== Declined ====
- Robert Kaiser, Paramus Councilmember
- Guy Talarico, former New Jersey General Assemblymember from the 38th district (1997–2002)

==== Results ====
Republican primary
Party	Candidate	Votes	%
Republican	Micheline Attieh	3,474	100.0
Total votes		3,474	100.0

=== General election ===
==== Predictions ====
Source	Ranking	As of
Elections Daily	Likely D	October 22, 2023
New Jersey Globe	Lean D	November 2, 2023

==== Results ====
38th Legislative District General Election, 2023
Party	Candidate	Votes	%
Democratic	Joseph A. Lagana (incumbent)	28,447	57.1
Republican	Micheline B. Attieh	21,361	42.9
Total votes		49,808	100.0
Democratic hold			

== District 39 ==
The incumbent is Republican Holly Schepisi who was re-elected with 57.16% of the vote in 2021. Joe Biden won this district with 52.72% in 2020.

=== Republican primary ===
==== Nominee ====
- Holly Schepisi, incumbent state senator

==== Withdrawn ====
- Michele LaTour, Northern Valley Regional High School District Board of Education member

==== Endorsements ====
Holly Schepisi (incumbent)

Labor unions

- New Jersey State Policemen’s Benevolent Association
- New Jersey Firefighters Mutual Benevolent Association

Organizations

- National Federation of Independent Business
- NEW JOBS PAC
- New Jersey Political Action for Candidate Election PAC

==== Convention results ====
Bergen County Republican convention
Party	Candidate	Votes	%
Republican	Holly Schepisi (incumbent)	189	73.3
Republican	Michele LaTour	69	26.7
Total votes		258	100.0

==== Primary results ====
Republican primary
Party	Candidate	Votes	%
Republican	Holly Schepisi (incumbent)	5,948	100.0
Total votes		5,948	100.0

=== Democratic primary ===
==== Nominee ====
- Jodi Murphy, former Westwood Councilmember

==== Endorsements ====
Jodi Murphy

Organizations

- Planned Parenthood Action Fund
- Freethought Equality Fund PAC

==== Results ====
Democratic primary
Party	Candidate	Votes	%
Democratic	Jodi Murphy	6,753	100.0
Total votes		6,753	100.0

=== General election ===
==== Predictions ====
Source	Ranking	As of
Elections Daily	Likely R	October 22, 2023
New Jersey Globe	Likely R	November 2, 2023

==== Results ====
39th Legislative District General Election, 2023
Party	Candidate	Votes	%
Republican	Holly Schepisi (incumbent)	34,448	54.9
Democratic	Jodi A. Murphy	28,264	45.1
Total votes		62,712	100.0
Republican hold			

== District 40 ==
The incumbent is Republican Kristin M. Corrado who was re-elected with 60.97% of the vote in 2021. Joe Biden won this district with 50.24% in 2020

=== Republican primary ===
==== Nominee ====
- Kristin M. Corrado, incumbent state senator

==== Endorsements ====
Kristin Corrado (incumbent)

Labor unions

- New Jersey State Policemen’s Benevolent Association
- New Jersey Firefighters Mutual Benevolent Association

Organizations

- National Federation of Independent Business
- NRA Political Victory Fund
- NEW JOBS PAC

==== Results ====
Republican primary
Party	Candidate	Votes	%
Republican	Kristin M. Corrado (incumbent)	6,276	100.0
Total votes		6,276	100.0

=== Democratic primary ===
==== Nominee ====
- Jennifer Ehrentraut, Hawthorne School Board member

==== Endorsements ====
Jennifer Ehrentraut

Labor unions

- New Jersey AFL-CIO
- Health Professionals and Allied Employees

Organizations

- Planned Parenthood Action Fund

==== Results ====
Democratic primary
Party	Candidate	Votes	%
Democratic	Jennifer Ehrentraut	6,132	100.0
Total votes		6,132	100.0

=== General election ===
==== Predictions ====
Source	Ranking	As of
Elections Daily	Safe R	October 22, 2023
New Jersey Globe	Solid R	November 2, 2023

==== Results ====
40th Legislative District General Election, 2023
Party	Candidate	Votes	%
Republican	Kristin M. Corrado (incumbent)	29,349	56.3
Democratic	Jennifer Ehrentraut	22,821	43.7
Total votes		52,170	100.0
Republican hold			

== See also ==
- 2023 New Jersey elections
- 2023 New Jersey General Assembly election
- List of New Jersey state legislatures
