= Hainesport Township, New Jersey =

Township in Burlington County, New Jersey, US

- Township
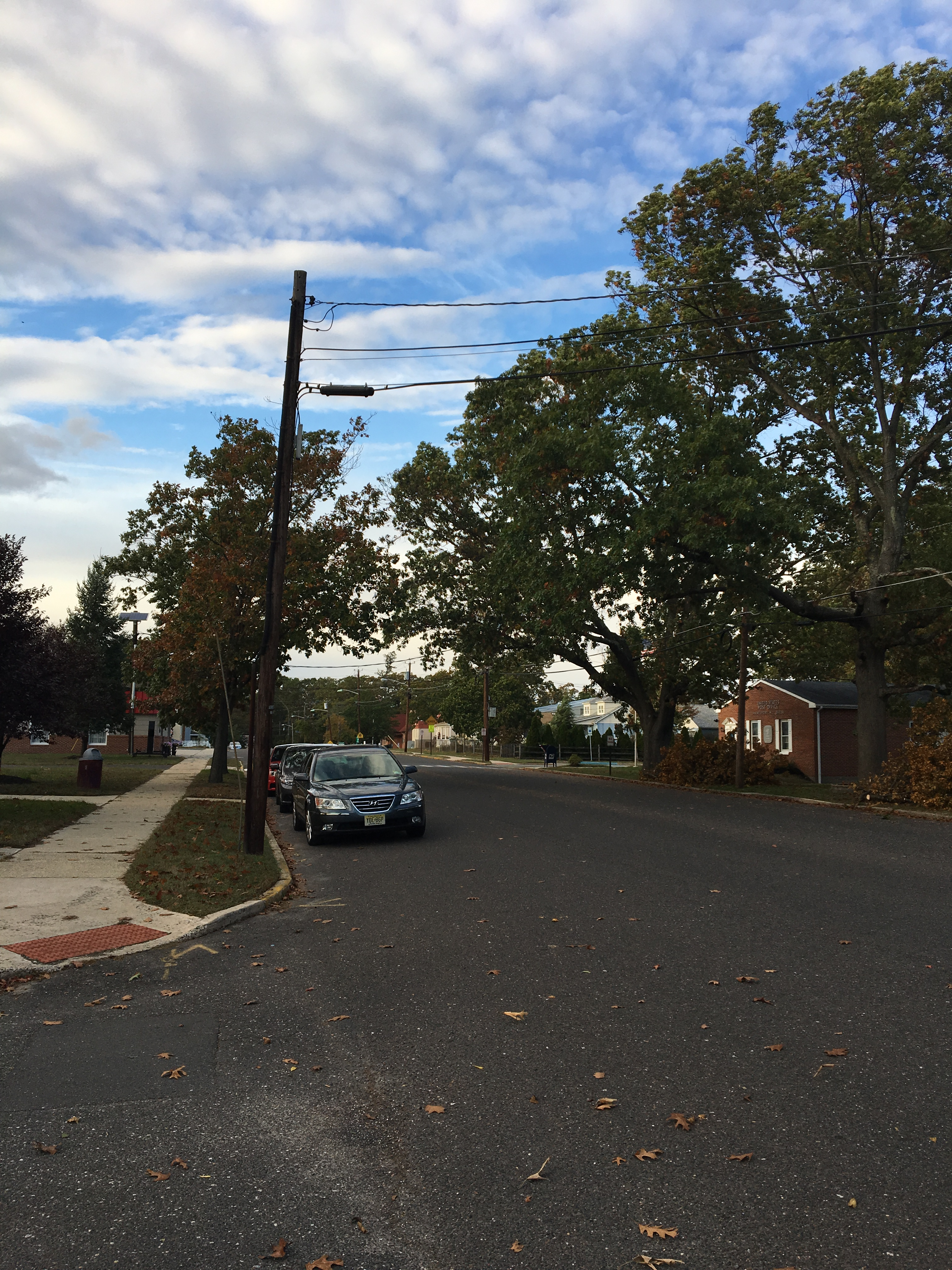
- Broad Street in Hainesport

- Seal

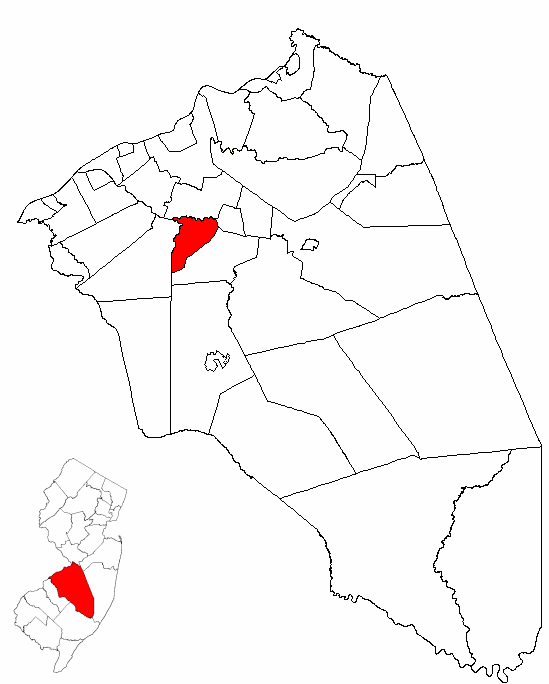
- Location of Hainesport Township in Burlington County highlighted in red (right). Inset map: Location of Burlington County in New Jersey highlighted in red (left).

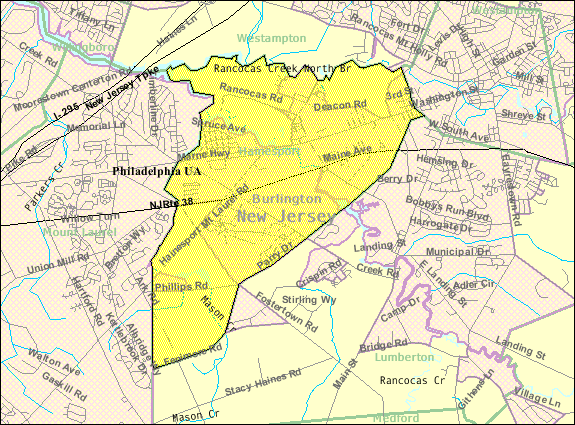
- Census Bureau map of Hainesport Township, New Jersey

- Location in Burlington County Location in New Jersey Location in the United States
- Coordinates: 39.977956°N 74.836334°W
- Country: United States
- State: New Jersey
- County: Burlington
- Incorporated: March 12, 1924

Government
  - Type: Township
  - Body: Township Committee
  - Mayor: Andy Dick (R, term ends December 31, 2026)
  - Administrator / Municipal clerk: Paula L. Kosco

Area
  - Total: 6.79 sq mi (17.59 km^{2})
  - Land: 6.47 sq mi (16.76 km^{2})
  - Water: 0.32 sq mi (0.83 km^{2}) 4.71%
  - Rank: 245th of 565 in state 25th of 40 in county
- Elevation: 49 ft (15 m)

Population (2020)
  - Total: 6,035
  - Estimate (2023): 6,057
  - Rank: 345th of 565 in state 28th of 40 in county
  - Density: 932.8/sq mi (360.2/km^{2})
  - Rank: 392nd of 565 in state 25th of 40 in county
- Time zone: UTC−05:00 (Eastern (EST))
  - Summer (DST): UTC−04:00 (Eastern (EDT))
- ZIP Code: 08036
- Area code: 609
- FIPS code: 3400529010
- GNIS feature ID: 0882092
- Website: www.hainesporttownship.com

Hainesport Township is a township in Burlington County, in the U.S. state of New Jersey. As of the 2020 United States census, the township's population was 6,035, a decline of 75 (-1.2%) from the 2010 census enumeration of 6,110, in turn reflecting an increase of 1,984 (+48.1%) from the 4,126 counted in the 2000 census. The township, and all of Burlington County, is a part of the Philadelphia metropolitan area.

== History ==
The Lenape Native Americans who settled on the banks of the Rancocas Creek in what is present-day Hainesport called the area Sandhickney. The first European settlers were Quakers who arrived in 1677.

The town was known as Long Bridge around the time of the American Revolutionary War. The name came from the long, wooden bridge that spanned the Rancocas Creek. In 1778, the township was the site of a skirmish in which American rebels fired upon Hessian soldiers after they were halted by the dismantling of this bridge.

The settlement became known as Haines' Port when Barclay Haines bought property in the area and established a pier near his home on the Rancocas Creek in 1848. By 1850, the name was shortened to Hainesport. Hainesport Township was incorporated as a township by an act of the New Jersey Legislature on March 12, 1924, from portions of Lumberton.

== Geography ==
According to the United States Census Bureau, the township had a total area of 6.79 square miles (17.59 km^{2}), including 6.47 square miles (16.76 km^{2}) of land and 0.32 square miles (0.83 km^{2}) of water (4.71%).

Unincorporated communities, localities and place names located partially or completely within the township include Clermont, Creekview, Franklin Estates, The Glen at Mason's Creek, Hainesport Chase, Lakeside at Creekview, Mason's Woods, Oakdale, Rancocas Heights, Sage Run and Union Mills.

The township borders Lumberton, Mount Laurel, Mount Holly and Westampton (across the Rancocas Creek north branch).

== Demographics ==
Historical population
Census	Pop.	Note	%±
1930	984		—
1940	858		−12.8%
1950	1,793		109.0%
1960	3,271		82.4%
1970	2,990		−8.6%
1980	3,236		8.2%
1990	3,249		0.4%
2000	4,126		27.0%
2010	6,110		48.1%
2020	6,035		−1.2%
2023 (est.)	6,057		0.4%
Population sources: 1930–2000; 1930 1940–2000; 2000 2010 2020

=== 2010 census ===
The 2010 United States census counted 6,110 people, 2,239 households, and 1,726 families in the township. The population density was 945.9 per square mile (365.2/km^{2}). There were 2,305 housing units at an average density of 356.8 per square mile (137.8/km^{2}). The racial makeup was 84.78% (5,180) White, 7.50% (458) Black or African American, 0.10% (6) Native American, 4.08% (249) Asian, 0.00% (0) Pacific Islander, 1.42% (87) from other races, and 2.13% (130) from two or more races. Hispanic or Latino of any race were 5.07% (310) of the population.

Of the 2,239 households, 34.8% had children under the age of 18; 65.0% were married couples living together; 8.0% had a female householder with no husband present and 22.9% were non-families. Of all households, 18.9% were made up of individuals and 9.9% had someone living alone who was 65 years of age or older. The average household size was 2.72 and the average family size was 3.11.

25.4% of the population were under the age of 18, 6.1% from 18 to 24, 24.2% from 25 to 44, 30.1% from 45 to 64, and 14.3% who were 65 years of age or older. The median age was 41.9 years. For every 100 females, the population had 92.9 males. For every 100 females ages 18 and older there were 89.9 males.

The Census Bureau's 2006–2010 American Community Survey showed that (in 2010 inflation-adjusted dollars) median household income was $87,047 (with a margin of error of +/− $8,609) and the median family income was $95,054 (+/− $7,689). Males had a median income of $64,477 (+/− $9,344) versus $40,658 (+/− $8,999) for females. The per capita income for the borough was $35,813 (+/− $2,708). No families and 1.9% of the population were below the poverty line, including 1.3% of those under age 18 and 1.1% of those age 65 or over.

=== 2000 census ===
As of the 2000 United States census there were 4,126 people, 1,477 households, and 1,150 families residing in the township. The population density was 632.8 inhabitants per square mile (244.3/km^{2}). There were 1,555 housing units at an average density of 238.5 per square mile (92.1/km^{2}). The racial makeup of the township was 94.09% White, 2.67% African American, 0.10% Native American, 1.70% Asian, 0.51% from other races, and 0.95% from two or more races. Hispanic or Latino people of any race were 2.13% of the population.

There were 1,477 households, out of which 35.7% had children under the age of 18 living with them, 67.5% were married couples living together, 7.2% had a female householder with no husband present, and 22.1% were non-families. 17.5% of all households were made up of individuals, and 8.3% had someone living alone who was 65 years of age or older. The average household size was 2.78 and the average family size was 3.16.

In the township the population was spread out, with 26.3% under the age of 18, 5.7% from 18 to 24, 31.4% from 25 to 44, 24.9% from 45 to 64, and 11.8% who were 65 years of age or older. The median age was 38 years. For every 100 females, there were 95.7 males. For every 100 females age 18 and over, there were 94.5 males.

The median income for a household in the township was $66,417, and the median income for a family was $72,005. Males had a median income of $49,015 versus $33,932 for females. The per capita income for the township was $28,091. About 2.0% of families and 3.0% of the population were below the poverty line, including 3.1% of those under age 18 and 5.2% of those age 65 or over.

== Arts and culture ==
In 2023, Danish artist Thomas Dambo constructed "Big Rusty," a freestanding artwork standing 20 feet (6.1 m) high that was made with pieces of discarded material found by the artist. It is the first of 10 giant recycled trash troll sculptures in Dambo's "The Way of the Bird King" series.

== Parks and recreation ==
A portion of Rancocas State Park is located in Hainesport Township. There are hiking/biking trails, equestrian trails, and canoe and fishing access to the Rancocas Creek. This part of Rancocas State Park is jointly managed by Burlington County Parks and the State Department of Parks and Forestry. Long Bridge Park, a Burlington County Park, is located between Deacon Road and the Mount Holly By-Pass and has entrances from both roadways. Besides fishing and hiking and biking trails, there are children's play areas, drinking fountains, and restrooms. Groups can reserve picnic pavilions with charcoal grills. A township park surrounds the municipal building. There is a play ground and the walking trails connect the park to the Hainesport Public School play ground. There are tennis and pickleball courts and soccer, soft ball, and baseball fields. Local businesses and families sponsor a summer concert series.

== Government ==
=== Local government ===
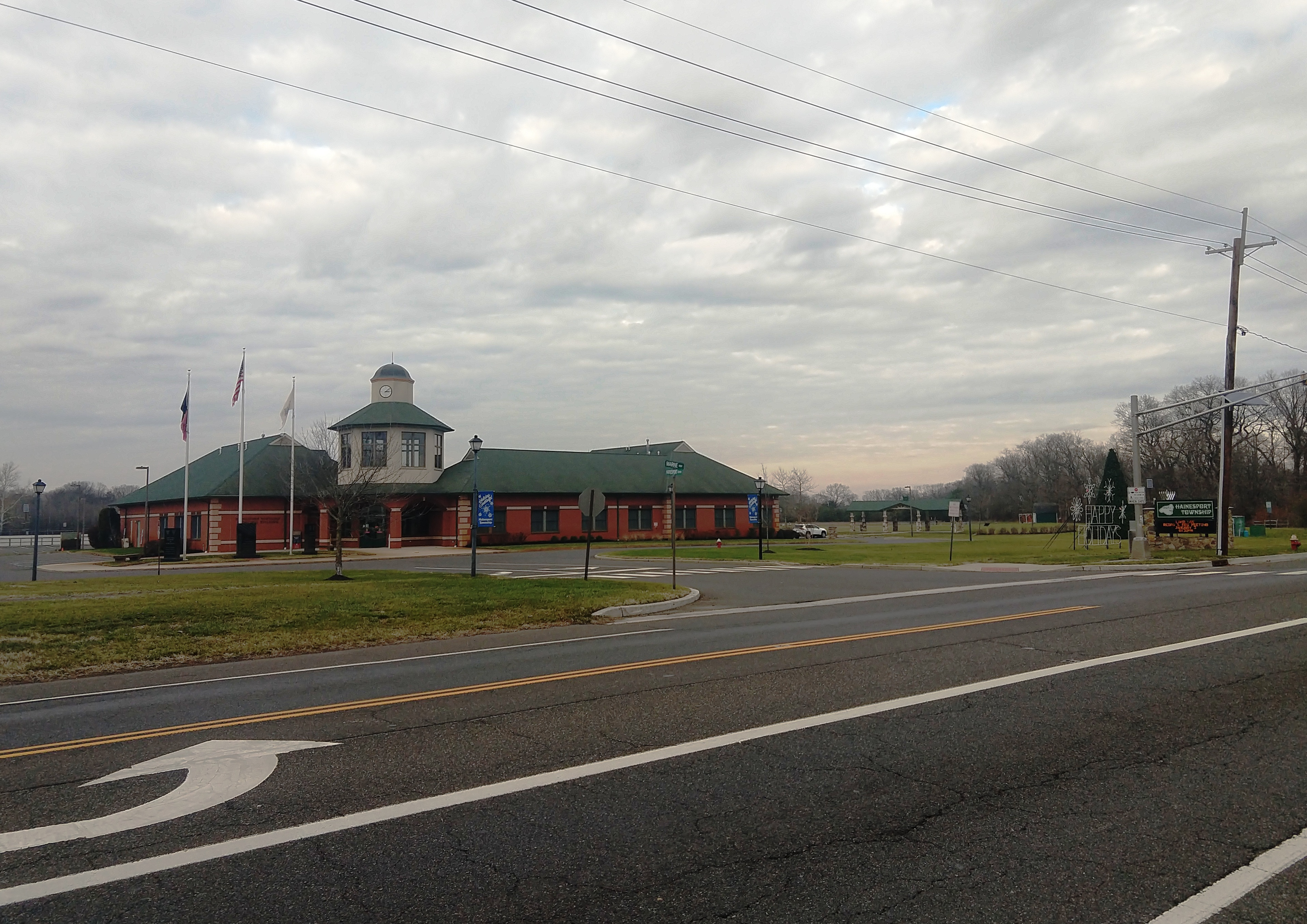
Hainesport Township municipal building

Hainesport Township is governed under the Township form of New Jersey municipal government, one of 141 municipalities (of the 564) statewide that use this form, the second-most commonly used form of government in the state.The Township Committee is comprised of five members, who are elected directly by the voters at-large in partisan elections to serve three-year terms of office on a staggered basis, with either one or two seats coming up for election each year as part of the November general election in a three-year cycle. At an annual reorganization meeting, the Township Committee selects one of its members to serve as mayor and another as deputy mayor.

As of 2026, members of the Hainesport Township Committee are Mayor Andy Dick (R, term as committee member ends December 31, 2027; term as mayor ends 2026), Deputy Mayor Karen Tordy (R, term on committee and as deputy mayor ends 2026), Anna M. Evans (D, 2028), Sam Loveman (D, 2028) and Ken Montgomery (R, 2026).

=== Federal, state and county representation ===
Hainesport Township is located in the 3rd Congressional District and is part of New Jersey's 8th state legislative district.

For the 119th United States Congress, New Jersey's 3rd congressional district is currently represented Herb Conaway (D, Delran Township). New Jersey is represented in the United States Senate by Democrats Cory Booker (Newark, term ends 2027) and Andy Kim (Moorestown, term ends 2031).

For the 2026–2027 session, the 8th legislative district of the New Jersey Legislature is represented in the New Jersey Senate by Latham Tiver (R, Southampton Township) and in the General Assembly by Anthony Angelozzi (D, Hammonton) and Andrea Katz (D, Chesterfield Township).

Burlington County is governed by a Board of County Commissioners comprised of five members who are chosen at-large in partisan elections to serve three-year terms of office on a staggered basis, with either one or two seats coming up for election each year; at an annual reorganization meeting, the board selects a director and deputy director from among its members to serve a one-year term. As of 2026, Burlington County's Commissioners are: Director Felicia Hopson (D, Willingboro Township, term as commissioner ends December 31, 2027; term as director ends 2026), Deputy Director Allison Eckel (D, Medford, term as commissioner ends 2028; term as deputy director ends 2026), Randy Brolo (D, Lumberton, 2026; elected to an unexpired term), Tyler Burrell (D, Delran Township, 2027) and Tom Pullion (D, Edgewater Park, 2026).

Burlington County's constitutional officers are Clerk Joanne Schwartz (D, Southampton Township, 2028), Sheriff James H. Kostoplis (D, Bordentown, 2028) and Surrogate Brian J. Carlin (D, Burlington Township, 2026).

=== Politics ===
United States presidential election results for Hainesport Township 2024 2020 2016 2012 2008 2004
Year	Republican		Democratic		Third party(ies)	
Year	No.	%	No.	%	No.	%
2024	1,544	48.16%	1,634	50.97%	28	0.87%
2020	1,957	48.21%	2,029	49.99%	73	1.80%
2016	1,617	48.23%	1,602	47.78%	134	4.00%
2012	1,650	51.34%	1,545	48.07%	19	0.59%
2008	1,594	48.13%	1,679	50.69%	39	1.18%
2004	1,643	54.12%	1,367	45.03%	26	0.86%

As of March 2011, there were a total of 4,014 registered voters in Hainesport Township, of which 1,089 (27.1% vs. 33.3% countywide) were registered as Democrats, 1,244 (31.0% vs. 23.9%) were registered as Republicans and 1,679 (41.8% vs. 42.8%) were registered as Unaffiliated. There were 2 voters registered as either Libertarians or Greens. Among the township's 2010 Census population, 65.7% (vs. 61.7% in Burlington County) were registered to vote, including 88.0% of those ages 18 and over (vs. 80.3% countywide).

Gubernatorial election results for Hainesport Township
Year	Republican		Democratic		Third party(ies)	
Year	No.	%	No.	%	No.	%
2025	1,431	47.10%	1,591	52.37%	16	0.53%
2021	1,399	53.03%	1,229	46.59%	10	0.38%
2017	1,134	53.24%	960	45.07%	36	1.69%
2013	1,444	70.85%	566	27.77%	28	1.37%
2009	1,250	55.85%	856	38.25%	132	5.90%
2005	1,074	53.06%	877	43.33%	73	3.61%

In the 2012 presidential election, Republican Mitt Romney received 1,650 votes here (50.9% vs. 40.2% countywide), ahead of Democrat Barack Obama with 1,545 votes (47.7% vs. 58.1%) and other candidates with 19 votes (0.6% vs. 1.0%), among the 3,239 ballots cast by the township's 4,217 registered voters, for a turnout of 76.8% (vs. 74.5% in Burlington County). In the 2008 presidential election, Democrat Barack Obama received 1,679 votes here (50.3% vs. 58.4% countywide), ahead of Republican John McCain with 1,594 votes (47.8% vs. 39.9%) and other candidates with 39 votes (1.2% vs. 1.0%), among the 3,338 ballots cast by the township's 4,022 registered voters, for a turnout of 83.0% (vs. 80.0% in Burlington County). In the 2004 presidential election, Republican George W. Bush received 1,643 votes here (54.0% vs. 46.0% countywide), ahead of Democrat John Kerry with 1,367 votes (44.9% vs. 52.9%) and other candidates with 26 votes (0.9% vs. 0.8%), among the 3,045 ballots cast by the township's 3,650 registered voters, for a turnout of 83.4% (vs. 78.8% in the whole county).

In the 2013 gubernatorial election, Republican Chris Christie received 1,444 votes here (69.7% vs. 61.4% countywide), ahead of Democrat Barbara Buono with 566 votes (27.3% vs. 35.8%) and other candidates with 28 votes (1.4% vs. 1.2%), among the 2,073 ballots cast by the township's 4,222 registered voters, yielding a 49.1% turnout (vs. 44.5% in the county). In the 2009 gubernatorial election, Republican Chris Christie received 1,250 votes here (55.4% vs. 47.7% countywide), ahead of Democrat Jon Corzine with 856 votes (37.9% vs. 44.5%), Independent Chris Daggett with 105 votes (4.7% vs. 4.8%) and other candidates with 27 votes (1.2% vs. 1.2%), among the 2,258 ballots cast by the township's 4,044 registered voters, yielding a 55.8% turnout (vs. 44.9% in the county).

United States Senate election results for Hainesport Township1
Year	Republican		Democratic		Third party(ies)	
Year	No.	%	No.	%	No.	%
2024	1,424	45.41%	1,679	53.54%	33	1.05%
2018	1,611	53.95%	1,233	41.29%	142	4.76%
2012	1,564	50.73%	1,490	48.33%	29	0.94%
2006	1,111	55.80%	842	42.29%	38	1.91%

United States Senate election results for Hainesport Township2
Year	Republican		Democratic		Third party(ies)	
Year	No.	%	No.	%	No.	%
2020	1,983	49.84%	1,954	49.11%	42	1.06%
2014	1,018	54.18%	830	44.17%	31	1.65%
2013	658	54.07%	548	45.03%	11	0.90%
2008	1,518	49.54%	1,510	49.28%	36	1.17%

== Education ==
The Hainesport Township School District serves public school students in pre-kindergarten through eighth grade at the Hainesport School. As of the 2021–22 school year, the district, comprised of one school, had an enrollment of 553 students and 56.0 classroom teachers (on an FTE basis), for a student–teacher ratio of 9.9:1.

For ninth through twelfth grades, public school students attend the Rancocas Valley Regional High School, a comprehensive regional public high school serving students from five communities encompassing approximately 40 square miles (100 km^{2}) and comprised of the townships of Eastampton, Hainesport, Lumberton, Mount Holly and Westampton. As of the 2021–22 school year, the high school had an enrollment of 2,048 students and 140.3 classroom teachers (on an FTE basis), for a student–teacher ratio of 14.6:1. The school is located in Mount Holly Township. The district's board of education is comprised of nine members who are elected directly by voters to serve three-year terms of office on a staggered basis, with three seats up for election each year as part of the November general election. Seats on the board are allocated based on the population of the five constituent municipalities, with one seat assigned to Hainesport Township.

Students from Hainesport Township, and from all of Burlington County, are eligible to attend the Burlington County Institute of Technology, a countywide public school district that serves the vocational and technical education needs of students at the high school and post-secondary level at its campuses in Medford and Westampton.

== Transportation ==
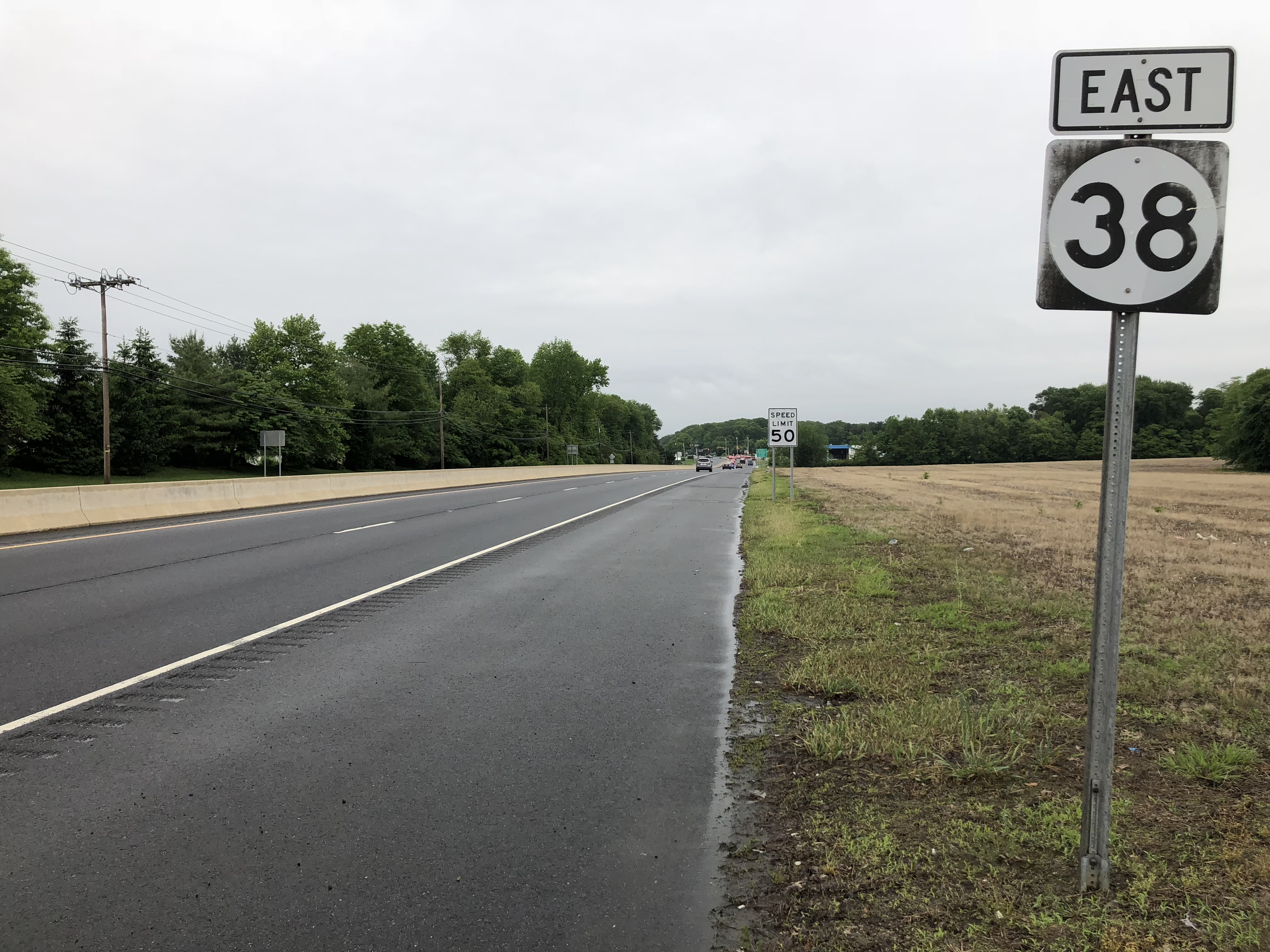
Route 38 in Hainesport

=== Roads and highways ===
As of May 2010, the township had a total of 43.05 miles (69.28 km) of roadways, of which 30.72 miles (49.44 km) were maintained by the municipality, 9.50 miles (15.29 km) by Burlington County and 2.83 miles (4.55 km) by the New Jersey Department of Transportation.

Route 38 passes through in the center of the township. The two major county roads that pass through are CR 537 near the center and CR 541 in the eastern section.

I-295 and the New Jersey Turnpike are accessible outside the municipality in neighboring Westampton and Mount Laurel townships.

=== Public transportation ===
NJ Transit provides bus service in the township on the 317 route between Asbury Park and Philadelphia, and on the 413 route between Camden and Burlington.

BurLink bus service is offered on the B1 route operating between Beverly and Pemberton.

== Points of interest ==
Barclay Haines home, 1848.

Mount Moriah AME Church Cemetery contains the graves of 22 Afro-American Civil War veterans.

== Notable people ==
People who were born in, residents of, or otherwise closely associated with Hainesport Township include:

- Ben Ijalana (born 1989), offensive tackle who has played in the NFL for the Indianapolis Colts and the New York Jets
- Ryan Peters (born c. 1982), politician who has represented the 8th Legislative District in the New Jersey General Assembly from 2018 to 2022
- Robert C. Shinn Jr. (1937-2023), politician who served in the New Jersey General Assembly from the 8th Legislative District from 1985 to 1994, after serving as mayor of Hainesport in 1973 and 1974
- Jeremiah Trotter (born 1977), American football linebacker who played in the National Football League for 12 seasons
- Jeremiah Trotter Jr. (born 2002), American football linebacker who has played in the NFL for the Philadelphia Eagles
