= Burlington County Board of County Commissioners =

Leadership
- Director: Felicia Hopson (D)
- Deputy Director: Allison Eckel (D)

Structure
- Seats: 5
- Political groups: Democratic Party (5)
- Length of term: 3 years

Website
- Burlington County Commissioners

The Burlington County Board of County Commissioners (formerly called The Burlington County Board of Chosen Freeholders) is a board of five people who govern Burlington County, New Jersey. The board is headed by two people: the director and the deputy director. They are chosen by the board. The current director is Felicia Hopson and the deputy director is Commissioner Allison Eckel.

== Responsibilities ==
As a local government the board is mostly responsible for governing the county and setting a budget.

== Sessions ==
=== 2019 ===
During the 2018 elections, candidate George Youngkin faced allegations of domestic abuse and dropped out of the race; however, he was still on the ballot, and was subsequently elected to the Board. He resigned from the Board on January 2, 2019, one day after becoming a Commissioner. He was replaced with Daniel J. O'Connell.

=== Composition ===
Year	Seat 1	Seat 2	Seat 3	Seat 4	Seat 5
2008	Aubrey Fenton (R)	Dawn Marie Addiego (R)	Bill Haines Jr. (R)	James Wujcik (R)	Joseph Donnelly (R)
2008	Aubrey Fenton (R)	Stacey Jordan (R)	Bill Haines Jr. (R)	James Wujcik (R)	Joseph Donnelly (R)
2009	Chris Brown (D)	Mary Anne I. Reinhart (D)	Bill Haines Jr. (R)	James Wujcik (R)	Joseph Donnelly (R)
2010	Chris Brown (D)	Mary Anne I. Reinhart (D)	Bruce Garganio (R)	Mary Ann O’Brien (R)	Joseph Donnelly (R)
2010	Chris Brown (R)	Mary Anne I. Reinhart (D)	Bruce Garganio (R)	Mary Ann O’Brien (R)	Joseph Donnelly (R)
2011	Chris Brown (R)	Mary Anne I. Reinhart (D)	Bruce Garganio (R)	Mary Ann O’Brien (R)	Joseph Donnelly (R)
2012	Leah Arter (R)	Joe Howarth (R)	Bruce Garganio (R)	Mary Ann O’Brien (R)	Joseph Donnelly (R)
2013	Leah Arter (R)	Joe Howarth (R)	Aimee Belgard (D)	Joanne Schwartz (D)	Joseph Donnelly (R)
2014	Leah Arter (R)	Joe Howarth (R)	Aimee Belgard (D)	Joanne Schwartz (D)	Joseph Donnelly (R)
2014	Bruce Garganio (R)	Joe Howarth (R)	Aimee Belgard (D)	Joanne Schwartz (D)	Joseph Donnelly (R)
2015	Bruce Garganio (R)	Mary Ann O'Brien (R)	Aimee Belgard (D)	Joanne Schwartz (D)	Joseph Donnelly (R)
2016	Bruce Garganio (R)	Mary Ann O'Brien (R)	Kate Gibbs (R)	Ryan Peters (R)	Joseph Donnelly (R)
2016	Bruce Garganio (R)	Mary Ann O'Brien (R)	Kate Gibbs (R)	Ryan Peters (R)	Latham Tiver (R)
2017	Bruce Garganio (R)	Linda Hughes (R)	Kate Gibbs (R)	Ryan Peters (R)	Latham Tiver (R)
2018	Tom Pullion (D)	Balvir Singh (D)	Kate Gibbs (R)	Linda Hughes (R)	Latham Tiver (R)
2019	Tom Pullion (D)	Balvir Singh (D)	Felicia Hopson (D)	George Youngkin (D)	Latham Tiver (R)
2019	Tom Pullion (D)	Balvir Singh (D)	Felicia Hopson (D)	Daniel O'Connell (D)	Latham Tiver (R)
2020	Tom Pullion (D)	Balvir Singh (D)	Felicia Hopson (D)	Daniel O'Connell (D)	Linda A. Hynes (D)
2021	Tom Pullion (D)	Balvir Singh (D)	Felicia Hopson (D)	Daniel O'Connell (D)	Linda A. Hynes (D)
2022	Tom Pullion (D)	Balvir Singh (D)	Felicia Hopson (D)	Daniel O'Connell (D)	Allison Eckel (D)
2023	Tom Pullion (D)	Balvir Singh (D)	Felicia Hopson (D)	Daniel O'Connell (D)	Allison Eckel (D)
2024	Tom Pullion (D)	Balvir Singh (D)	Felicia Hopson (D)	Daniel O'Connell (D)	Allison Eckel (D)
2025	Tom Pullion (D)	Balvir Singh (D)	Felicia Hopson (D)	Tyler Burrell (D)	Allison Eckel (D)
2025	Tom Pullion (D)	Randy Brolo (D)	Felicia Hopson (D)	Tyler Burrell (D)	Allison Eckel (D)
