= Andrea Katz =

American politician and lawyer

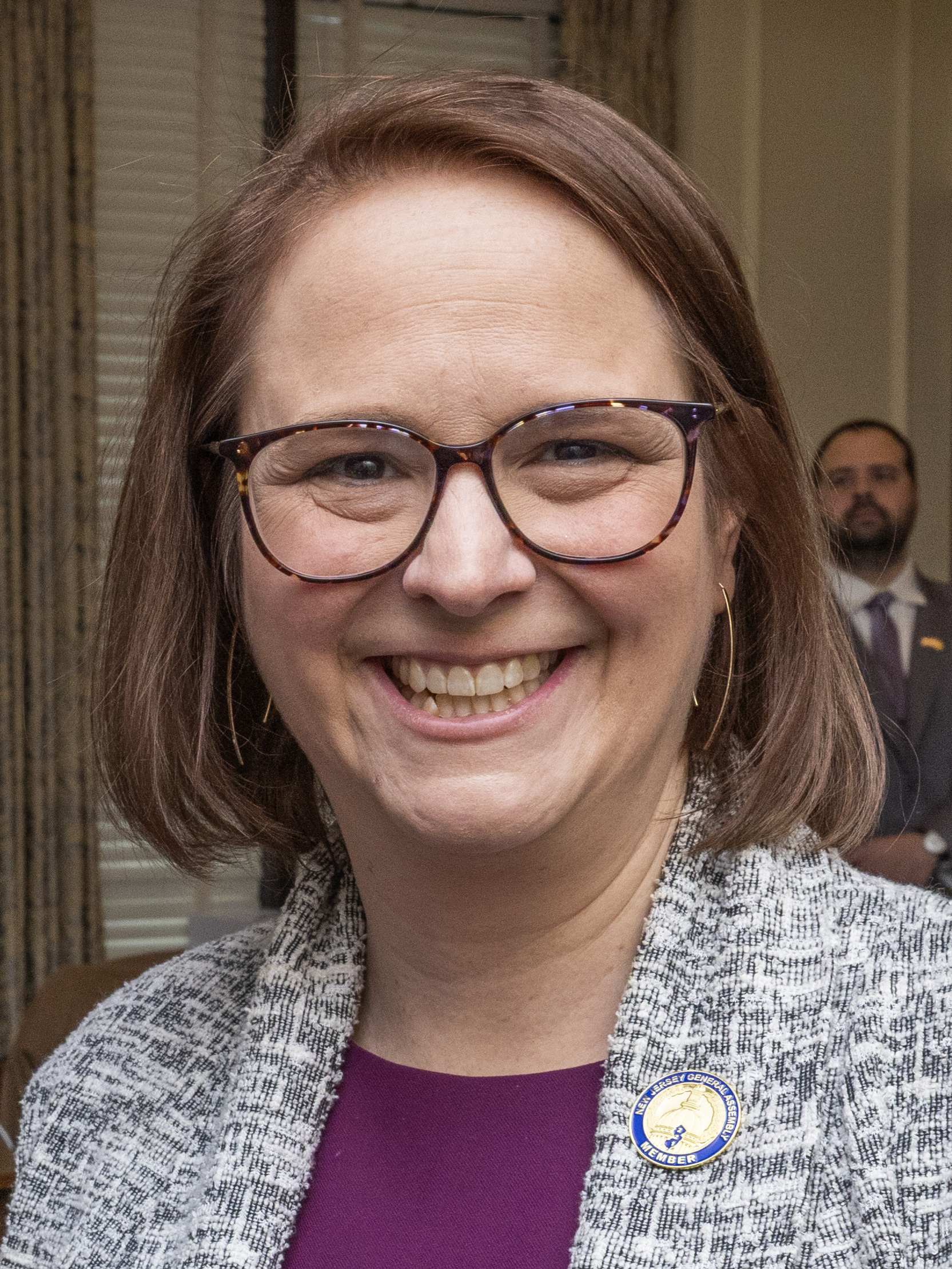
- Katz in 2025

Member of the New Jersey General Assembly from the 8th district
- Incumbent
- Assumed office January 9, 2024 Serving with Anthony Angelozzi (2026–present); Michael Torrissi (2024–2026)
- Preceded by: Brandon Umba

Personal details
- Born: 1978 or 1979 (age 46–47)
- Party: Democratic

Andrea Katz (born 1978 or 1979) is an American Democratic Party politician serving as a member of the New Jersey General Assembly for the 8th legislative district, since taking office on January 9, 2024.

== Biography ==
Katz was raised in Pennsylvania, where she attended Pennsbury High School and Bucks County Community College. A resident of Chesterfield Township, New Jersey, Katz served on the Chesterfield School Board.

== Elective office ==
In the 2023 New Jersey General Assembly election, Democrat Katz edged Republican incumbent Brandon Umba for the second seat. Umba's running mate Michael Torrissi won re-election, while Katz pulled ahead by a 250-vote margin, with Katz's running mate Anthony Angelozzi in third place and Umba in fourth. The victory by Katz gave Democrats in the Assembly a sixth seat flipped from Republicans in the 2023 election. Katz is the first elected Democrat to represent the 8th district since John A. Sweeney in 1974.

=== District 8 ===
Each of the 40 districts in the New Jersey Legislature has one representative in the New Jersey Senate and two members in the New Jersey General Assembly. The representatives from the 8th District for the 2026—2027 Legislative Session are:

- Senator Latham Tiver (R)
- Assemblywoman Andrea Katz (D)
- Assemblyman Anthony Angelozzi (D)

== Electoral history ==
8th Legislative District General Election, 2023
Party	Candidate	Votes	%
Republican	Michael Torrissi Jr. (incumbent)	27,881	25.3%
Democratic	Andrea Katz	27,636	25.1%
Democratic	Anthony Angelozzi	27,438	24.9%
Republican	Brandon Umba (incumbent)	27,384	24.8%
Total votes		110,339	100.0
Republican hold			
Democratic gain from Republican			
