= Ryan Peters (politician) =

American politician

Ryan E. Peters

Member of the New Jersey General Assembly from the 8th district
- In office January 9, 2018 – January 11, 2022 Serving with Jean Stanfield
- Preceded by: Maria Rodriguez-Gregg
- Succeeded by: Brandon Umba; Michael Torrissi

Member of the Burlington County Board of Chosen Freeholders
- In office January 4, 2016 – January 9, 2018
- Preceded by: Aimee Belgard
- Succeeded by: Linda Hughes

Personal details
- Born: c. 1982 (age 43–44)
- Party: Republican
- Spouse: Stacy Peters
- Children: 3
- Education: United States Naval Academy (BS); Rutgers University (JD)
- Website: Legislative Website

Military service
- Allegiance: United States
- Branch/service: United States Navy
- Years of service: 2004–present
- Rank: Captain

Ryan E. Peters (born c. 1982) is an American Republican Party politician and lawyer who represented the 8th Legislative District in the New Jersey General Assembly from 2018 to 2022. He replaced Maria Rodriguez-Gregg, who did not run for re-election to the Assembly. Peters had previously served on the Burlington County Board of Chosen Freeholders and served active duty as a Navy SEAL before running for office. Peters currently serves reserve duty as a SEAL.

== Early life ==
A resident of Hainesport Township, Peters is a graduate of Holy Cross High School. Peters played soccer with the varsity team and graduated from the United States Naval Academy with a bachelor of science degree in political science; he earned a juris doctor degree from Rutgers School of Law–Camden in 2012, where he was president of the Student Bar Association and edited the Rutgers Journal of Law and Religion. An attorney with the firm of Pepper Hamilton, Peters specializes in money laundering compliance. Peters served as a Navy SEAL in the United States Navy since 2004, attaining the rank of Captain, and continues service in the United States Navy Reserve.

== Burlington County Board of Chosen Freeholders ==
From 2016 to 2018, Peters served on the Burlington County Board of Chosen Freeholders. When he was sworn in as freeholder in January 2016, he and his running mate Kate Gibbs gave the county the state's youngest freeholder board, with Peters being 33 years old and Gibbs 29. Peters served on the board's Personnel and Military Affairs committees and was appointed as the liaison to the county's Department of Public Safety and to the Burlington County Prosecutor’s Office.

== New Jersey Assembly ==
In September 2017, Peters was chosen by the Burlington County Republican Committee to run for the Assembly seat after two-term incumbent Maria Rodriguez-Gregg deciding against running for election after an incident earlier that year in which police thought that she was driving under the influence following a traffic accident. In the November 2017 general election, Peters (with 28,671 votes; 25.0% of all ballots cast) and his running mate, incumbent Joe Howarth (with 28,841; 25.1%), defeated Democratic challengers Joanne Schwartz (28,321; 24.7%) and Maryann Merlino (28,196; 24.6%) to win both Assembly seats from the district for the Republicans. Of all 40 districts, the race in the 8th District was the closest in the state, with 650 votes separating the first and fourth vote-getters. With Joanne Schwartz, the closest Democratic candidate 350 votes behind Peters for the second seat from the district, the Democratic Party had considered filing for a recount; Peters stepped down from the Board of Chosen Freeholders, leaving Republicans to fill the seat with a candidate who could run in the November 2018 general election with fellow incumbent Kate Gibbs, with control of the board in the balance. In January 2018, former freeholder Linda Hughes was selected to fill the seat vacated by Peters when he took office in the Assembly.

On January 14, 2020, Peters was sworn into his second term in the New Jersey General Assembly.

On January 21, 2021, Peters announced that he would not be a candidate for reelection, citing the desire to spend more time with his family.

=== Committees ===
- Appropriations
- Financial Institutions and Insurance
- State and Local Government

== Awards and honors ==
In July 2018, Peters was included in InsiderNJ's list of Millennials on the Rise.

In December 2019, Peters was recognized by InsiderNJ as Politician of the Year in their 2019 Retrospective Edition.

== Electoral history ==
=== Assembly ===
New Jersey general election, 2019
Party	Candidate	Votes	%	±%
Republican	Jean Stanfield	25,050	25.37	▲0.27
Republican	Ryan Peters	24,906	25.23	▲0.23
Democratic	Gina LaPlaca	23,895	24.2	▼0.5
Democratic	Mark Natale	23,092	23.4	▼1.2
MAGA Conservative	Tom Giangiulio Jr.	1,777	0.02	N/A
Total votes		98,720	100.0	

New Jersey general election, 2017
Party	Candidate	Votes	%	±%
Republican	Joe Howarth	28,841	25.1	▼24.8
Republican	Ryan Peters	28,671	25.0	▼25.1
Democratic	Joanne Schwartz	28,321	24.7	N/A
Democratic	Maryann Merlino	28,196	24.6	N/A
No Status Quo	Ryan T. Calhoun	753	0.7	N/A
Total votes		114,782	100.0	

New Jersey General Assembly
Preceded by Maria Rodriguez-Gregg	Member of the New Jersey General Assembly for the 8th District; January 9, 2018 – January 11, 2022; With: Joe Howarth	Succeeded by Brandon Umba; Michael Torrissi
