= Michael Torrissi =

Member of the New Jersey General Assembly

Member of the New Jersey General Assembly from the 8th district
- In office January 11, 2022 – January 13, 2026
- Preceded by: Ryan Peters; Jean Stanfield
- Succeeded by: Anthony Angelozzi

Personal details
- Born: 1974 (age 51–52)
- Party: Republican
- Education: Rutgers University
- Website: Legislative webpage

Michael Torrissi Jr. (born 1974) is an American Republican Party politician who represented the 8th Legislative district in the New Jersey General Assembly from January 11, 2022 to January 13, 2026.

Torissi graduated in 1993 from Hammonton High School.

== Elected office ==
In February 2011, Torissi was appointed to fill the vacant Hammonton Town Council seat that had been held by James Bertino until he resigned to take a seat on the Board of County Freeholders; he served until 2012 and again from 2015 to 2020. He lost re-election to the Assembly in 2025.

=== District 8 ===
Each of the 40 districts in the New Jersey Legislature has one representative in the New Jersey Senate and two members in the New Jersey General Assembly. During His time in office, Torrissi served alongside Senator Latham Tiver (R) and Assemblyman Andrea Katz (D).

== Electoral history ==
8th Legislative District General Election, 2023
Party	Candidate	Votes	%
Republican	Michael Torrissi Jr. (incumbent)	27,881	25.3%
Democratic	Andrea Katz	27,636	25.1%
Democratic	Anthony Angelozzi	27,438	24.9%
Republican	Brandon Umba (incumbent)	27,384	24.8%
Total votes		110,339	100.0
Republican hold			
Democratic gain from Republican			

8th legislative district general election, 2021
Party	Candidate	Votes	%
Republican	Michael Torrissi Jr.	40,467	26.45%
Republican	Brandon Umba	39,039	25.52%
Democratic	Allison Eckel	36,828	24.08%
Democratic	Mark Natale	36,634	23.95%
Total votes		152,968	100.0
Republican hold			
