= Jean Stanfield =

Member-elect of the New Jersey General Assembly

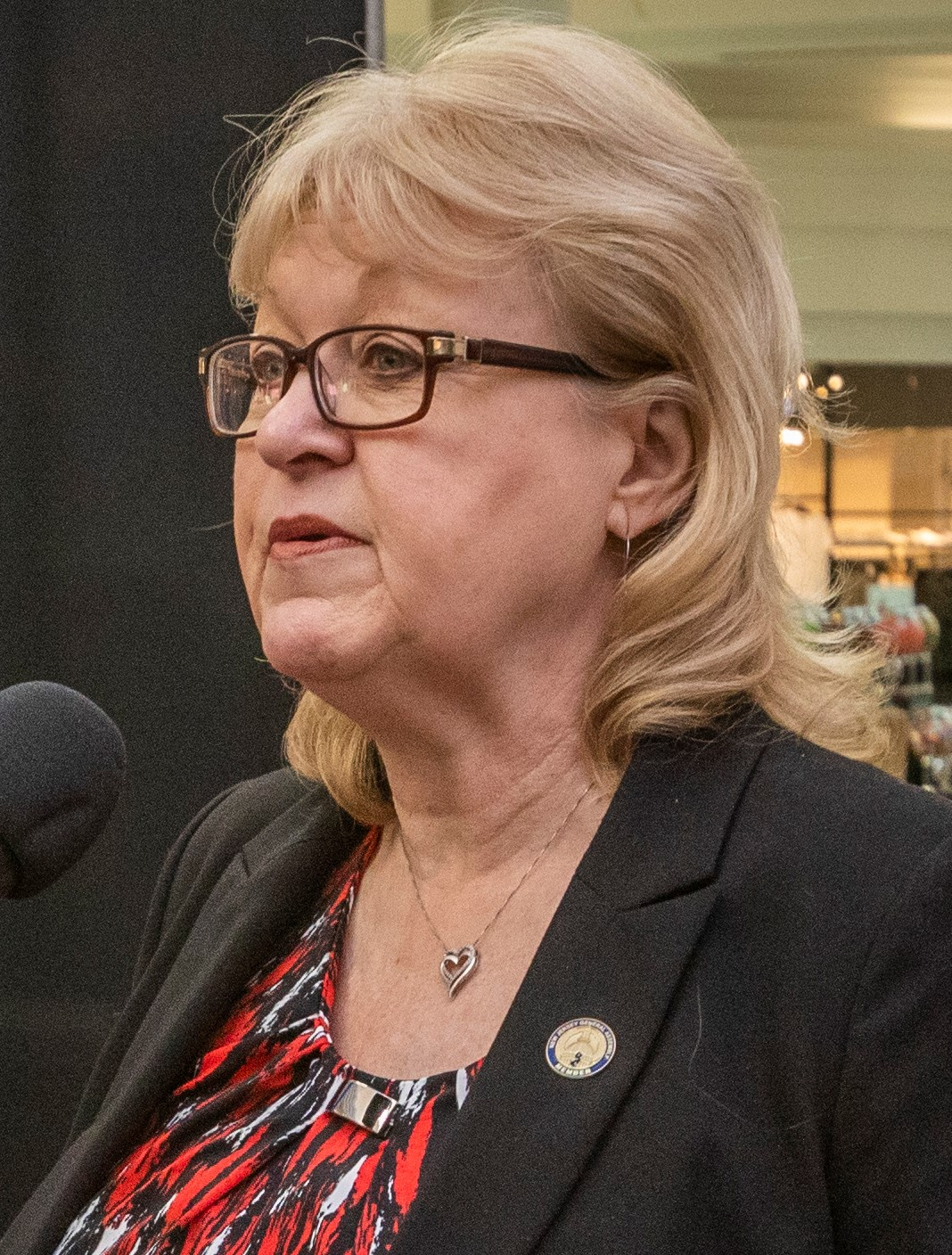

Member of the New Jersey Senate from the 8th district
- In office January 11, 2022 – January 9, 2024
- Preceded by: Dawn Addiego
- Succeeded by: Latham Tiver

Member of the New Jersey General Assembly from the 8th district
- In office January 14, 2020 – January 11, 2022 Serving with Ryan Peters
- Preceded by: Joe Howarth
- Succeeded by: Brandon Umba; Michael Torrissi

Sheriff of Burlington County
- In office January 1, 2002 – May 1, 2019
- Preceded by: Gary L. Daniels
- Succeeded by: Anthony Basantis

Burlington County Undersheriff
- In office 1996–2002

Burlington County Assistant Prosecutor
- In office 1993–1996

Personal details
- Party: Republican
- Education: The College of New Jersey (BA); Rutgers University (JD)
- Website: Legislative webpage

Jean Stanfield is an American politician who served in the New Jersey Senate, representing the 8th Legislative District from 2022 to 2024. She previously served in the New Jersey General Assembly, representing the 8th Legislative District from 2020 to 2022. Stanfield served as Sheriff of Burlington County from 2002 to 2019.

== Burlington County Sheriff ==
First elected Sheriff in 2001, Stanfield was re-elected five times as Sheriff. On February 22, 2019, she announced she would not run for a seventh term in 2019 and would resign as Sheriff on May 1 of that year.

== New Jersey Assembly ==
After the 8th District's Senator Dawn Addiego switched her party from Republican to Democrat in early 2019, one of the district's sitting Assemblyman Joe Howarth reportedly attempted to do the same. The Burlington County Republican Party dropped support for Howarth, choosing to instead support former Burlington County Sheriff Stanfield to run with incumbent Ryan Peters. In the primary election Howarth heavily tied himself to President Donald Trump and lost to Stanfield and Peters.

Stanfield, a resident of Westampton Township, and Peters faced off against Democrats Mark Natale and Gina LaPlaca in the general election. Peters and Stanfield won by a little over 1,100 votes.

== New Jersey Senate ==
In the 2021 general election, Stanfield ran for the New Jersey State Senate against incumbent Democrat Dawn Addiego, who had long served in public office as a Republican but switched to the Democratic Party in January 2019. With two weeks left before election day, the race for the three seats in the legislature had already attracted $3 million in spending by the candidates and outside groups. Stanfield narrowly defeated Addiego despite the latter’s 12-1 fundraising margin.

On January 11, 2023, Stanfield announced that she would not be a candidate for reelection.

=== Committees ===
Committee assignments for the 2022—23 Legislative Session are:

- Environment and Energy
- Law and Public Safety

== Electoral history ==
=== Assembly ===
New Jersey General Assembly election for the 8th Legislative District, 2019
Party	Candidate	Votes	%
Republican	Jean Stanfield	25,050	25.58
Republican	Ryan Peters (Incumbent)	24,906	25.43
Democratic	Gina LaPlaca	23,895	24.21
Democratic	Mark Natale	23,092	23.58
MAGA Conservative	Tom Giangiulio	1,777	1.80
Total votes		97,916	'100.0'

=== Sheriff ===
Burlington County Sheriff Election Results, 2016
Party	Candidate	Votes	%
Republican	Jean Stanfield	103,877	52.52
Democratic	James H. Kostopolis	93,830	47.44
Total votes		197,707	'100.0'

Burlington County Sheriff Election Results, 2013
Party	Candidate	Votes	%
Republican	Jean Stanfield	67,744	57.51
Democratic	James H. Kostopolis	50,025	42.46
Total votes		117,769	'100.0'
