= Brandon Umba =

Member of the New Jersey General Assembly

Member of the New Jersey General Assembly from the 8th district
- In office January 11, 2022 – January 9, 2024 Serving with Michael Torrissi
- Preceded by: Ryan Peters; Jean Stanfield
- Succeeded by: Andrea Katz

Personal details
- Born: September 8, 1985 (age 40)
- Party: Republican
- Education: Catholic University (BA)
- Website: Assembly website

Brandon Umba (born September 8, 1985) is an American Republican Party politician who represented the 8th Legislative district in the New Jersey General Assembly from January 11, 2022, to January 9, 2024. He narrowly lost re-election by 252 votes in 2023 in an upset to Democrat Andrea Katz. Umba later announced he would run for his seat again in 2025. He ran again, but in the 2025 New Jersey General Assembly election, not only did he lose once more, but Angelozzi beat Republican incumbent Michael Torrissi who edged out Angelozzi for the other seat in 2023.

A resident of Medford, where he has served on the Zoning Board of Adjustment, Umba has served as the Township Administrator of West Deptford Township, Lumberton and Manchester Township.

== District 8 ==
Each of the 40 districts in the New Jersey Legislature has one representative in the New Jersey Senate and two members in the New Jersey General Assembly. The other representatives from the 8th District for the 2022—2023 Legislative Session were:

- Senator Jean Stanfield (R)
- Assemblyman Michael Torrissi (R)

== Electoral history ==
8th Legislative District General Election, 2023
Party	Candidate	Votes	%
Republican	Michael Torrissi Jr. (incumbent)	27,881	25.3%
Democratic	Andrea Katz	27,636	25.1%
Democratic	Anthony Angelozzi	27,438	24.9%
Republican	Brandon Umba (incumbent)	27,384	24.8%
Total votes		110,339	100.0
Republican hold			
Democratic gain from Republican			

8th legislative district general election, 2021
Party	Candidate	Votes	%
Republican	Michael Torrissi Jr.	40,467	26.45%
Republican	Brandon Umba	39,039	25.52%
Democratic	Allison Eckel	36,828	24.08%
Democratic	Mark Natale	36,634	23.95%
Total votes		152,968	100.0
Republican hold			
