= Anthony Angelozzi =

American teacher and politician

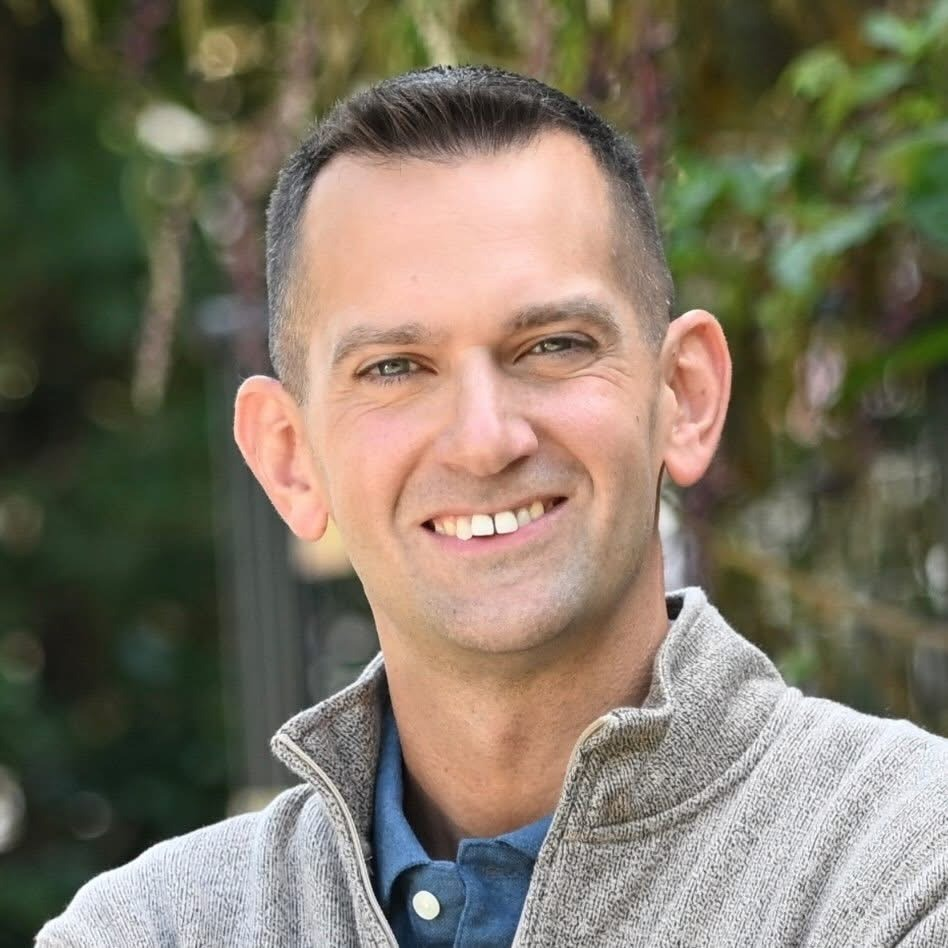

Member of the New Jersey General Assembly from the 8th district
- Incumbent
- Assumed office January 13, 2026 Serving with Andrea Katz
- Preceded by: Michael Torrissi

Personal details
- Born: May 8, 1985 (age 41)
- Party: Democratic
- Education: Rutgers University–Camden; American Public University
- Website: Legislative webpage

Anthony Angelozzi (born May 8, 1985) is a teacher, local union president, and politician from New Jersey who represents the 8th Legislative District in the New Jersey General Assembly since taking office in January 2026.

== Background ==
Angelozzi, the son of two casino gaming employees, worked his way through college by dealing blackjack and roulette at the AC Hilton and Taj Mahal in Atlantic City. He earned a bachelor's degree at Rutgers University–Camden in economics and earned a master's degree in United States History at American Public University. Angelozzi teaches United States History at Hammonton High School and leads the staff labor union, the Hammonton Education Association, an affiliate of the New Jersey Education Association (NJEA). He previously worked as a part-time NJEA Uniserv consultant for Atlantic and Cape May counties, specifically working as a union organizer and contract negotiator. Angelozzi is also an Executive Board member and Trustee in the Historical Society of Hammonton.

Angelozzi and his wife, Tracy, have two children and reside in Hammonton.

== Elective office ==
In the 2025 New Jersey General Assembly election, Angelozzi beat Republican incumbent Michael Torrissi for one of the two seats up for election. In the 2023 race, the nominees for the two seats had been the same four: Angelozzi, Torrissi, Katz and Republican then-incumbent Brandon Umba, but Torrissi had edged out Angelozzi for the other seat. At the time, Katz was the first elected Democrat to represent the 8th district since John A. Sweeney in 1974.

=== District 8 ===
Each of the 40 districts in the New Jersey Legislature has one representative in the New Jersey Senate and two members in the New Jersey General Assembly. The assembly members from the 8th District for the 2024—2025 Legislative Session were Katz and Torrissi.
