= Latham Tiver =

American politician from New Jersey

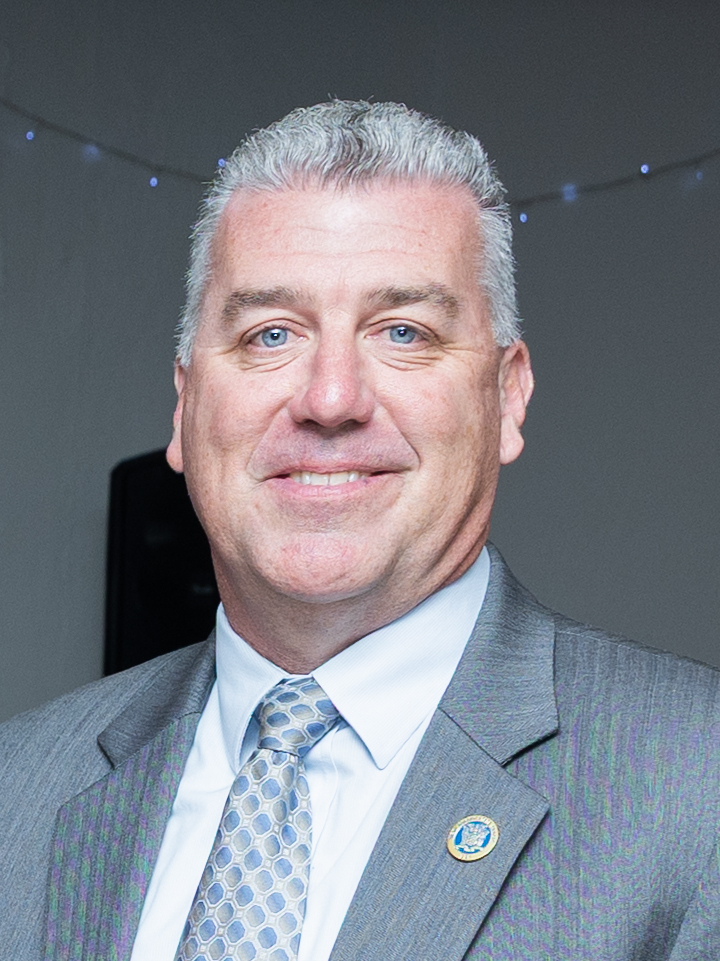
- Tiver in 2025

Member of the New Jersey Senate from the 8th district
- Incumbent
- Assumed office January 9, 2024
- Preceded by: Jean Stanfield

Personal details
- Born: July 5, 1973 (age 52)
- Party: Republican
- Website: Legislative webpage

Latham Tiver (born July 5, 1973) is an American labor union official and Republican Party politician serving as a member of the New Jersey Senate for the 8th legislative district, having taken office on January 9, 2024.

== Biography ==
Tiver graduated from Shawnee High School. A resident of Southampton Township, New Jersey, Tiver is employed, as the business representative of Local 825 of the International Union of Operating Engineers.

== Elective office ==
Tiver served on the Southampton Township Committee and was elected to the Burlington County Board of County Freeholders, serving in office from 2016 to 2019.

With Jean Stanfield not running for re-election after a single term in the Senate, Tiver stepped in and sought the Republican nomination. Tiver defeated Democrat Gaye Burton in the 2023 New Jersey Senate election. Tiver was one of 10 members elected for the first time in 2023 to serve in the Senate, one quarter of all seats.

=== Committee assignments ===
Committee assignments for the 2024—2025 Legislative Session are:

- Environment and Energy
- Military and Veterans' Affairs
- Transportation

=== District 8 ===
Each of the 40 districts in the New Jersey Legislature has one representative in the New Jersey Senate and two members in the New Jersey General Assembly. The representatives from the 8th District for the 2024—2025 Legislative Session are:

- Senator Latham Tiver (R)
- Assemblywoman Andrea Katz (D)
- Assemblyman Michael Torrissi (R)

== Electoral history ==
=== Senate ===
8th Legislative District General Election, 2023
| Party | Candidate | Votes | % |
|---|---|---|---|
| Republican | Latham Tiver | 28,394 | 51.0 |
| Democratic | Gaye Burton | 27,236 | 49.0 |
| Total votes | | 55,630 | 100.0 |
| Republican hold | | | |
