= 2023 New Jersey General Assembly election =

- November 7, 2023

All 80 seats in the New Jersey General Assembly 41 seats needed for a majority
- Registered: 6,459,097
- Turnout: 27% ▼13%
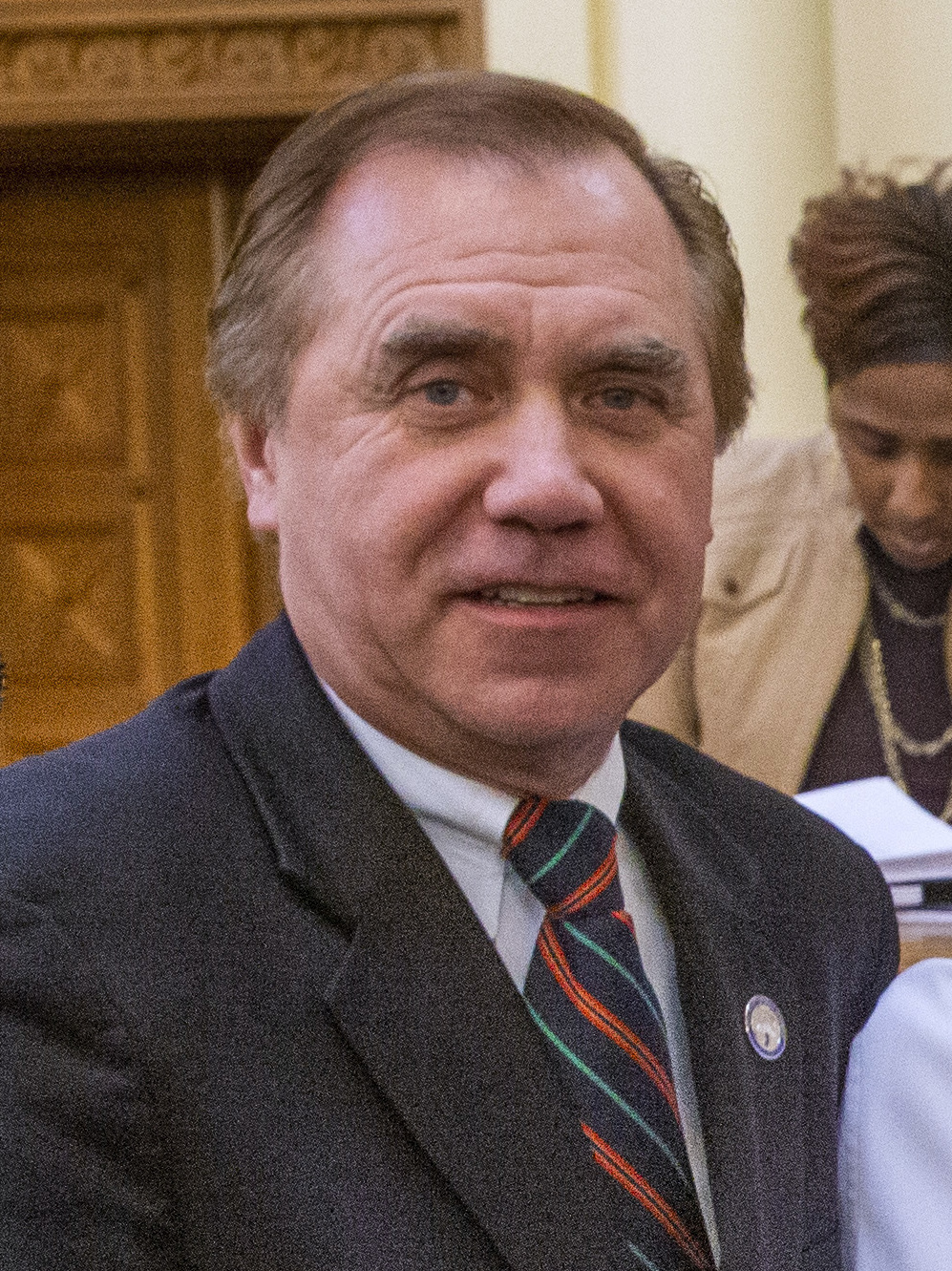

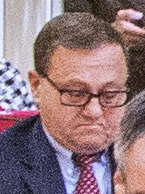
	Majority party	Minority party
Leader	Craig Coughlin	John DiMaio
Party	Democratic	Republican
Leader since	January 9, 2018	January 11, 2022
Leader's seat	19th (Woodbridge)	23rd (Hackettstown)
Last election	46 seats	34 seats
Seats before	46	34
Seats won	52	28
Seat change	▲6	▼6
Popular vote	1,804,115	1,575,074
Percentage	53.2%	46.4%
Swing	▲1.6%	▼1.8%
- Results: Democratic gain Democratic hold Republican hold
Speaker before election
Craig Coughlin
Democratic
Elected Speaker
Craig Coughlin
Democratic

The 2023 New Jersey General Assembly elections were held on November 7, 2023. New Jersey voters elected two Assembly members in all of the state's legislative districts for a two-year term to the New Jersey General Assembly. This was the first election after redistricting following the 2020 United States census.

Democrats expanded their majority in the chamber by picking up both seats in the 3rd and 11th districts, and one each in the 8th and 30th.

== Incumbents not running for re-election ==
As per 2021 redistricting

=== Democratic ===
- Daniel R. Benson, District 14 (successfully ran for Mercer County Executive)
- Annette Chaparro, District 33 (redistricted into District 32; lost party endorsement)
- Joseph V. Egan, District 17 (withdrew after renomination)
- Thomas P. Giblin, District 34 (redistricted into District 27)
- Sadaf Jaffer, District 16
- Mila Jasey, District 27 (redistricted into District 28)
- Angelica M. Jimenez, District 32 (redistricted into District 33; lost party endorsement; ran for West New York Board of Commissioners)
- John F. McKeon, District 27 (withdrew after renomination; successfully ran for State Senate)
- Angela V. McKnight, District 31 (successfully ran for State Senate)
- Pedro Mejia, District 32 (redistricted into District 33; lost party endorsement)
- Paul D. Moriarty, District 4 (successfully ran for State Senate)
- Gabriela Mosquera, District 4
- Raj Mukherji, District 33 (redistricted into District 32; successfully ran for State Senate)
- Britnee Timberlake, District 34 (successfully ran for State Senate)
- Jackie Yustein, District 28 (redistricted into District 34)

=== Republican ===
- John Catalano, District 10 (ran for mayor of Brick Township)
- DeAnne DeFuccio, District 39
- DiAnne Gove, District 9 (lost party endorsement)
- Kevin J. Rooney, District 40
- Beth Sawyer, District 3 (lost party endorsement; ran for State Senate)
- Parker Space, District 24 (successfully ran for State Senate)
- Hal Wirths, District 24

In addition, two members who were elected in the last election in 2021 left office before the election: Ronald S. Dancer (R-12th, died in office) and Ralph R. Caputo, (D-28th, resigned).

== Incumbents defeated ==
=== In general election ===
Five incumbent Assembly members, all Republicans, were defeated in the November 7 general election.

==== Republican ====
- Kim Eulner, District 11
- Bethanne McCarthy Patrick, District 3
- Marilyn Piperno, District 11
- Ned Thomson, District 30
- Brandon Umba, District 8

== Predictions ==
Source	Ranking	As of
270toWin	Solid D	September 6, 2023
Elections Daily	Safe D	October 22, 2023

== Results ==
=== Overview ===
↓
28	52
Republican	Democratic

Parties	Candidates	Seats				Popular vote		
Parties	Candidates	2021	2023	+/-	Strength	Vote	%	Change
Democratic	79	46	52	▲6	65%	1,804,115	53.2%	▲1.6%
Republican	73	34	28	▼6	35%	1,575,074	46.4%	▼1.8%
Independent	4	0	0	0	0%	11,496	0.6%	▲0.5%
Libertarian	2	0	0	0	0%	1,860	0.1%	Steady
Socialist Workers	1	0	0	0	0%	1,121	0.0%	N/A
Green	1	0	0	0	0%	979	0.0%	Steady
Total	160	80	80		100.00%	3,394,645 (Note: In General Assembly elections in New Jersey, voters can vote for two candidates. This results in the total number of votes per party being higher than the number of ballots cast.)	100.00%	
Ballots Cast						1,760,049	100%	
Turnout						1,760,049	27%	▼13%
Registered						6,459,097	100%	▼1.3%

=== By state legislative district ===
Legislative district	2020 Pres.	Incumbent	Party	Elected Assembly member	Outcome
District 1	R +3.7	Antwan McClellan	Rep	Antwan McClellan	Rep
District 1	R +3.7	Erik Simonsen	Rep	Erik Simonsen	Rep
District 2	D +11.5	Don Guardian	Rep	Don Guardian	Rep
District 2	D +11.5	Claire Swift	Rep	Claire Swift	Rep
District 3	R +2.6	Bethanne McCarthy Patrick	Rep	Dave Bailey Jr.	Dem
District 3	R +2.6	Beth Sawyer	Rep	Heather Simmons	Dem
District 4	D +6.9	Paul D. Moriarty	Dem	Dan Hutchison	Dem
District 4	D +6.9	Gabriela Mosquera	Dem	Cody Miller	Dem
District 5	D +36.9	William Spearman	Dem	William Spearman	Dem
District 5	D +36.9	Bill Moen	Dem	Bill Moen	Dem
District 6	D +32.5	Louis Greenwald	Dem	Louis Greenwald	Dem
District 6	D +32.5	Pamela Rosen Lampitt	Dem	Pamela Rosen Lampitt	Dem
District 7	D +31.5	Herb Conaway	Dem	Herb Conaway	Dem
District 7	D +31.5	Carol A. Murphy	Dem	Carol A. Murphy	Dem
District 8	D +4.6	Michael Torrissi	Rep	Michael Torrissi	Rep
District 8	D +4.6	Brandon Umba	Rep	Andrea Katz	Dem
District 9	R +25.1	Brian E. Rumpf	Rep	Brian E. Rumpf	Rep
District 9	R +25.1	DiAnne Gove	Rep	Greg Myhre	Rep
District 10	R +21.7	Gregory P. McGuckin	Rep	Gregory P. McGuckin	Rep
District 10	R +21.7	John Catalano	Rep	Paul Kanitra	Rep
District 11	D +13.2	Kim Eulner	Rep	Margie Donlon	Dem
District 11	D +13.2	Marilyn Piperno	Rep	Luanne Peterpaul	Dem
District 12	R +14.2	Robert D. Clifton	Rep	Robert D. Clifton	Rep
District 12	R +14.2	Alex Sauickie	Rep	Alex Sauickie	Rep
District 13	R +6.7	Gerard Scharfenberger	Rep	Gerard Scharfenberger	Rep
District 13	R +6.7	Vicky Flynn	Rep	Vicky Flynn	Rep
District 14	D +18.4	Wayne DeAngelo	Dem	Wayne DeAngelo	Dem
District 14	D +18.4	Daniel R. Benson	Dem	Tennille McCoy	Dem
District 15	D +47.5	Verlina Reynolds-Jackson	Dem	Verlina Reynolds-Jackson	Dem
District 15	D +47.5	Anthony Verrelli	Dem	Anthony Verrelli	Dem
District 16	D +20.8	Roy Freiman	Dem	Roy Freiman	Dem
District 16	D +20.8	Sadaf Jaffer	Dem	Mitchelle Drulis	Dem
District 17	D +45.8	Joseph V. Egan	Dem	Kevin Egan	Dem
District 17	D +45.8	Joseph Danielsen	Dem	Joseph Danielsen	Dem
District 18	D +22	Robert Karabinchak	Dem	Robert Karabinchak	Dem
District 18	D +22	Sterley Stanley	Dem	Sterley Stanley	Dem
District 19	D +19.1	Craig Coughlin	Dem	Craig Coughlin	Dem
District 19	D +19.1	Yvonne Lopez	Dem	Yvonne Lopez	Dem
District 20	D +42.6	Annette Quijano	Dem	Annette Quijano	Dem
District 20	D +42.6	Reginald Atkins	Dem	Reginald Atkins	Dem
District 21	D +17.4	Nancy Munoz	Rep	Nancy Munoz	Rep
District 21	D +17.4	Michele Matsikoudis	Rep	Michele Matsikoudis	Rep
District 22	D +35.2	James J. Kennedy	Dem	James J. Kennedy	Dem
District 22	D +35.2	Linda S. Carter	Dem	Linda S. Carter	Dem
District 23	R +5.3	Erik Peterson	Rep	Erik Peterson	Rep
District 23	R +5.3	John DiMaio	Rep	John DiMaio	Rep
District 24	R +14.1	Parker Space	Rep	Dawn Fantasia	Rep
District 24	R +14.1	Hal Wirths	Rep	Mike Inganamort	Rep
District 25	D +6.1	Aura Dunn	Rep	Aura Dunn	Rep
District 25	D +6.1	Christian Barranco (Note: Redistricted from the 26th district.)	Rep	Christian Barranco	Rep
District 26	R +1.5	Jay Webber	Rep	Jay Webber	Rep
District 26	R +1.5	Brian Bergen (Note: Redistricted from the 25th district.)	Rep	Brian Bergen	Rep
District 27	D +41.9	John F. McKeon	Dem	Rosy Bagolie	Dem
District 27	D +41.9	Thomas P. Giblin (Note: Redistricted from the 34th district.)	Dem	Alixon Collazos-Gill	Dem
District 28	D +84.3	Mila Jasey (Note: Redistricted from the 27th district.)	Dem	Garnet Hall	Dem
District 28	D +84.3	Cleopatra Tucker	Dem	Cleopatra Tucker	Dem
District 29	D +62	Eliana Pintor Marin	Dem	Eliana Pintor Marin	Dem
District 29	D +62	Shanique Speight	Dem	Shanique Speight	Dem
District 30	R +35.5	Sean T. Kean	Rep	Sean T. Kean	Rep
District 30	R +35.5	Ned Thomson	Rep	Avi Schnall	Dem
District 31	D +44.9	Angela V. McKnight	Dem	Barbara McCann Stamato	Dem
District 31	D +44.9	William Sampson	Dem	William Sampson	Dem
District 32	D +57.2	Raj Mukherji (Note: Redistricted from the 33rd district.)	Dem	John Allen	Dem
District 32	D +57.2	Annette Chaparro	Dem	Jessica Ramirez	Dem
District 33	D +37	Angelica M. Jimenez (Note: Redistricted from the 32nd district.)	Dem	Julio Marenco	Dem
District 33	D +37	Pedro Mejia	Dem	Gabe Rodriguez	Dem
District 34	D +51.5	Britnee Timberlake	Dem	Carmen Morales	Dem
District 34	D +51.5	Jackie Yustein (Note: Redistricted from the 28th district.)	Dem	Michael Venezia	Dem
District 35	D +40.9	Shavonda E. Sumter	Dem	Shavonda E. Sumter	Dem
District 35	D +40.9	Benjie E. Wimberly	Dem	Benjie E. Wimberly	Dem
District 36	D +13.6	Gary Schaer	Dem	Gary Schaer	Dem
District 36	D +13.6	Clinton Calabrese	Dem	Clinton Calabrese	Dem
District 37	D +40.2	Shama Haider	Dem	Shama Haider	Dem
District 37	D +40.2	Ellen Park	Dem	Ellen Park	Dem
District 38	D +14.1	Lisa Swain	Dem	Lisa Swain	Dem
District 38	D +14.1	Chris Tully	Dem	Chris Tully	Dem
District 39	D +6.4	Robert Auth	Rep	Robert Auth	Rep
District 39	D +6.4	DeAnne DeFuccio	Rep	John Azzariti	Rep
District 40	D +1.4	Kevin J. Rooney	Rep	Al Barlas	Rep
District 40	D +1.4	Christopher DePhillips	Rep	Christopher DePhillips	Rep

=== Close races ===
Districts where the difference of total votes between the top-two parties was under 10%:

1. District 8, 0.2% gain D
2. District 3, 2.2% gain
3. District 4, 5.4%
4. District 21, 3.6%
5. District 25, 4.2%
6. District 39, 6.8%
7. District 40, 9.8%

== District 1 ==
The incumbents were Republicans Antwan McClellan, who was re-elected with 31.30% of the vote in 2021, and Erik K. Simonsen, who was re-elected with 31.61% of the vote in 2021. Donald Trump won this district by 51.61% in 2020.

=== Republican primary ===
==== Nominees ====
- Antwan McClellan, incumbent Assemblymember
- Erik Simonsen, incumbent Assemblymember

==== Endorsements ====
Antwan McClellan (incumbent)

Labor unions

- New Jersey AFL–CIO (co-endorsement with Simonsen)
Erik Simonsen (incumbent)

Labor unions

- New Jersey AFL–CIO (co-endorsement with McClellan)
- New Jersey Education Association

==== Results ====
Republican primary
Party	Candidate	Votes	%
Republican	Erik Simonsen (incumbent)	8,107	50.3%
Republican	Antwan McClellan (incumbent)	8,005	49.7%
Total votes		16,112	100.0%

=== Democratic primary ===
==== Nominees ====
- Eddie L. Bonner
- Damita White-Morris

==== Results ====
Democratic primary
Party	Candidate	Votes	%
Democratic	Damita White-Morris	6,129	50.3%
Democratic	Eddie L. Bonner	6,054	49.7%
Total votes		12,183	100.0%

=== General election ===
==== Predictions ====
Source	Seat	Ranking	As of
Elections Daily	Seat 1	Safe R	October 22, 2023
Elections Daily	Seat 2	Safe R	October 22, 2023
New Jersey Globe	Seat 1	Solid R	November 2, 2023
New Jersey Globe	Seat 2	Solid R	November 2, 2023

==== Results ====
1st Legislative District general election, 2023
Party	Candidate	Votes	%
Republican	Erik Simonsen (incumbent)	27,976	31.8
Republican	Antwan McClellan (incumbent)	27,603	31.3
Democratic	Damita White-Morris	16,257	18.5
Democratic	Eddie L. Bonner	16,228	18.4
Total votes		88,064	100.0
Republican hold			

== District 2 ==
The incumbents were Republicans Don Guardian, who was elected with 26.66% of the vote in 2021, and Claire Swift, who was elected with 26.81% of the vote in 2021. Joe Biden won this district with 55.43% of the vote in 2020.

=== Republican primary ===
==== Nominees ====
- Don Guardian, incumbent Assemblymember
- Claire Swift, incumbent Assemblymember

==== Endorsements ====
Don Guardian (incumbent)

Labor unions

- New Jersey AFL–CIO (co-endorsement with Swift)
- New Jersey Education Association

Organizations

- LGBTQ Victory Fund
Claire Swift (incumbent)

Labor unions

- New Jersey AFL–CIO (co-endorsement with Guardian)

==== Results ====
Republican primary
Party	Candidate	Votes	%
Republican	Don Guardian (incumbent)	6,051	50.3%
Republican	Claire Swift (incumbent)	5,980	49.7%
Total votes		12,031	100.0%

=== Democratic primary ===
==== Nominees ====
- Lisa Bender, marine scientist
- Alphonso Harrell, teacher

==== Withdrawn ====
- Caren Fitzpatrick, Atlantic County Board of Commissioner and nominee for this seat in 2021 (running for State Senate)

==== Endorsements ====
Caren Fitzpatrick (withdrawn)

Organizations

- New Jersey League of Conservation Voters

==== Results ====
Democratic primary
Party	Candidate	Votes	%
Democratic	Caren Fitzpatrick	7,270	50.6%
Democratic	Alphonso Harrell	7,086	49.4%
Total votes		14,356	100.0%

=== General election ===
==== Predictions ====
Source	Seat	Ranking	As of
Elections Daily	Seat 1	Lean R	October 22, 2023
Elections Daily	Seat 2	Lean R	October 22, 2023
New Jersey Globe	Seat 1	Lean R	November 2, 2023
New Jersey Globe	Seat 2	Lean R	November 2, 2023

==== Results ====
2nd Legislative District general election, 2023
Party	Candidate	Votes	%
Republican	Don Guardian (incumbent)	26,675	28.8
Republican	Claire Swift (incumbent)	25,460	27.5
Democratic	Elizabeth "Lisa" Bender	20,547	22.2
Democratic	Alphonso Harrell	19,835	21.4
Total votes		92,517	100.0
Republican hold			

== District 3 ==
The incumbents were Republicans Bethanne McCarthy Patrick, who was elected with 26.12% of the vote in 2021, and Beth Sawyer, who was elected with 26.23% of the vote in 2021 and is running for the New Jersey State Senate. Donald Trump won this district by 50.71% in 2020.

=== Republican primary ===
==== Nominees ====
- Bethanne McCarthy Patrick, incumbent Assemblymember
- Tom Tedesco, Hopewell Township Committeemember

==== Eliminated in primary ====
- Joseph Collins Jr., nephew of former Speaker of the New Jersey General Assembly Jack Collins

==== Withdrawn ====
- Beth Sawyer, incumbent Assemblymember (ran for State Senate)
- Adam Wingate, former Harrison Township Committeemember (running for Gloucester County Commissioner)

==== Convention results ====
Salem County Republican convention
Party	Candidate	Votes	%
Republican	Bethanne McCarthy Patrick (incumbent)	59	42.4%
Republican	Tom Tedesco	38	27.3%
Republican	Beth Sawyer (incumbent)	31	22.3%
Republican	Adam Wingate	11	7.9%
Total votes		139	100.0%

==== Primary results ====
Republican primary
Party	Candidate	Votes	%
Republican	Tom Tedesco	7,272	38.6%
Republican	Bethanne McCarthy Patrick (incumbent)	7,263	38.6%
Republican	Joseph Collins Jr.	4,284	22.8%
Total votes		18,819	100.0%

=== Democratic primary ===
==== Nominees ====
- David Bailey, non-profit CEO
- Heather Simmons, Gloucester County Commissioner

==== Eliminated in primary ====
- Robert Fitzpatrick
- Tanzie Youngblood, retired teacher and candidate for New Jersey's 2nd congressional district in 2018

==== Declined ====
- Douglas H. Fisher, former Secretary of Agriculture of New Jersey (2009–2023) and former New Jersey General Assemblymember from the 3rd district (2002–2009)

==== Endorsements ====
David Bailey

Labor unions

- New Jersey AFL–CIO (co-endorsement with Simmons)
- New Jersey Education Association (co-endorsement with Simmons)

Organizations

- New Jersey League of Conservation Voters (co-endorsement with Simmons)
Robert Fitzpatrick

Organizations

- Working Families Party (co-endorsement with Youngblood)
Heather Simmons

Labor unions

- New Jersey AFL–CIO (co-endorsement with Bailey)
- New Jersey Education Association (co-endorsement with Bailey)

Organizations

- New Jersey League of Conservation Voters (co-endorsement with Bailey)
Tanzie Youngblood

Organizations

- Working Families Party (co-endorsement with Fitzpatrick)

==== Results ====
Democratic primary
Party	Candidate	Votes	%
Democratic	Heather Simmons	9,430	37.8%
Democratic	David Bailey	8,678	34.8%
Democratic	Robert Fitzpatrick	3,439	13.8%
Democratic	Tanzie Youngblood	3,404	13.6%
Total votes		24,951	100.0%

=== General election ===
==== Predictions ====
Source	Seat	Ranking	As of
Elections Daily	Seat 1	Likely R	October 22, 2023
Elections Daily	Seat 2	Lean R	October 22, 2023
New Jersey Globe	Seat 1	Tossup	November 2, 2023
New Jersey Globe	Seat 2	Tossup	November 2, 2023

==== Results ====
3rd Legislative District general election, 2023
Party	Candidate	Votes	%
Democratic	Heather Simmons	30,861	25.6
Democratic	Dave Bailey Jr.	30,737	25.5
Republican	Bethanne McCarthy Patrick (incumbent)	29,522	24.5
Republican	Tom Tedesco	29,480	24.4
Total votes		120,600	100.0
Democratic gain from Republican			

== District 4 ==
The incumbents were Democrats Paul D. Moriarty, who was re-elected with 26.49% of the vote in 2021, and Gabriela Mosquera, who was re-elected with 25.83% of the vote in 2021. Joe Biden won this district by 52.96% in 2020.

=== Democratic primary ===
==== Nominees ====
- Dan Hutchison, Gloucester Township Councilmember
- Cody Miller, Monroe Township School Board member

==== Declined ====
- Paul D. Moriarty, incumbent Assemblymember (running for State Senate)
- Gabriela Mosquera, incumbent Assemblymember

==== Endorsements ====
Dan Hutchison

Labor unions

- New Jersey Education Association (co-endorsement with Miller)

Organizations

- New Jersey League of Conservation Voters (co-endorsement with Miller)
Cody Miller

Labor unions

- New Jersey Education Association (co-endorsement with Hutchison)

Organizations

- New Jersey League of Conservation Voters (co-endorsement with Hutchison)

==== Results ====
Democratic primary
Party	Candidate	Votes	%
Democratic	Dan Hutchison	11,696	50.2%
Democratic	Cody Miller	11,615	49.8%
Total votes		23,311	100.0%

=== Republican primary ===
==== Nominees ====
- Amanda Esposito, teacher
- Matthew Walker, former Buena Council President

==== Eliminated in primary ====
- Michael Clark, businessperson
- Denise Gonzalez, veteran
- John Keating, attorney

==== Endorsements ====
Matthew Walker

Labor unions

- New Jersey AFL–CIO

==== Results ====
Republican primary
Party	Candidate	Votes	%
Republican	Amanda Esposito	5,199	30.3%
Republican	Matthew Walker	5,110	29.8%
Republican	Michael Clark	3,053	17.8%
Republican	Denise Gonzalez	2,940	17.1%
Republican	John Keating	854	5.0%
Total votes		17,156	100.0%

=== General election ===
==== Predictions ====
Source	Seat	Ranking	As of
Elections Daily	Seat 1	Tossup	October 22, 2023
Elections Daily	Seat 2	Tossup	October 22, 2023
New Jersey Globe	Seat 1	Tossup	November 2, 2023
New Jersey Globe	Seat 2	Tossup	November 2, 2023

==== Results ====
4th Legislative District general election, 2023
Party	Candidate	Votes	%
Democratic	Dan Hutchison	30,116	26.5
Democratic	Cody D. Miller	29,770	26.2
Republican	Amanda Esposito	26,653	23.5
Republican	Matthew P. Walker	25,881	22.8
Conservatives South Jersey	Maureen Dukes Penrose	1,145	1.0
Total votes		113,565	100.0
Democratic hold			

== District 5 ==
The incumbents were Democrats William F. Moen Jr., who was re-elected with 28.74% of the vote in 2021, and William W. Spearman, who was re-elected with 28.38% of the vote in 2021. Joe Biden won this district by 68.05% in 2020.

=== Democratic primary ===
==== Nominees ====
- William F. Moen Jr., incumbent Assemblymember
- William W. Spearman, incumbent Assemblymember

==== Endorsements ====
William F. Moen Jr. (incumbent)

Labor unions

- New Jersey AFL–CIO
- New Jersey Education Association (co-endorsement with Spearman)
William W. Spearman (incumbent)

Labor unions

- New Jersey AFL–CIO
- New Jersey Education Association (co-endorsement with Moen)

==== Results ====
Democratic primary
Party	Candidate	Votes	%
Democratic	William W. Spearman (incumbent)	12,920	50.2%
Democratic	William F. Moen Jr. (incumbent)	12,826	49.8%
Total votes		25,746	100.0%

=== Republican primary ===
==== Nominees ====
- Joe Miller, candidate for Camden County Commissioner
- Yalinda Pagan

==== Results ====
Republican primary
Party	Candidate	Votes	%
Republican	Joe Miller	2,770	50.6%
Republican	Yalinda Pagan	2,704	49.4%
Total votes		5,474	100.0%

=== General election ===
==== Predictions ====
Source	Seat	Ranking	As of
Elections Daily	Seat 1	Safe D	October 22, 2023
Elections Daily	Seat 2	Safe D	October 22, 2023
New Jersey Globe	Seat 1	Solid D	November 2, 2023
New Jersey Globe	Seat 2	Solid D	November 2, 2023

==== Results ====
5th Legislative District general election, 2023
Party	Candidate	Votes	%
Democratic	William W. Spearman (incumbent)	25,994	35.1
Democratic	William F. Moen Jr. (incumbent)	25,757	34.7
Republican	Joe Miller	11,386	15.4
Republican	Yalinda Pagan	11,048	14.9
Total votes		74,135	100.0
Democratic hold			

== District 6 ==
The incumbents were Democrats Louis D. Greenwald, who was re-elected with 33.07% of the vote in 2021, and Pamela R. Lampitt, who was re-elected with 32.46% of the vote in 2021. Joe Biden won this district by 65.74% in 2020.

=== Democratic primary ===
==== Nominees ====
- Louis D. Greenwald, incumbent Assemblymember
- Pamela R. Lampitt, incumbent Assemblymember

==== Endorsements ====
Louis D. Greenwald (incumbent)

Labor unions

- New Jersey AFL–CIO (co-endorsement with Lampitt)
- New Jersey Education Association (co-endorsement with Lampitt)

Organizations

- New Jersey League of Conservation Voters (co-endorsement with Lampitt)
Pamela R. Lampitt (incumbent)

Labor unions

- New Jersey AFL–CIO (co-endorsement with Greenwald)
- New Jersey Education Association (co-endorsement with Greenwald)

Organizations

- New Jersey League of Conservation Voters (co-endorsement with Greenwald)

==== Results ====
Democratic primary
Party	Candidate	Votes	%
Democratic	Louis D. Greenwald (incumbent)	15,352	50.3%
Democratic	Pamela R. Lampitt (incumbent)	15,150	49.7%
Total votes		30,502	100.0%

=== Republican primary ===
==== Nominees ====
- Danielle M. Barry
- Daniel M. Kenny

==== Results ====
Republican primary
Party	Candidate	Votes	%
Republican	Daniel M. Kenny	4,067	50.4%
Republican	Danielle M. Barry	4,004	49.6%
Total votes		8,071	100.0%

Following the primary, Kenny withdrew from the general election on August 28. Brian McRory was selected as a replacement candidate on August 31.

=== General election ===
==== Predictions ====
Source	Seat	Ranking	As of
Elections Daily	Seat 1	Safe D	October 22, 2023
Elections Daily	Seat 2	Safe D	October 22, 2023
New Jersey Globe	Seat 1	Solid D	November 2, 2023
New Jersey Globe	Seat 2	Solid D	November 2, 2023

==== Results ====
6th Legislative District general election, 2023
Party	Candidate	Votes	%
Democratic	Louis D. Greenwald (incumbent)	34,717	35.1
Democratic	Pamela R. Lampitt (incumbent)	34,185	34.6
Republican	Danielle M. Barry	15,067	15.2
Republican	Brian McRory	14,945	15.1
Total votes		98,914	100.0
Democratic hold			

== District 7 ==
The incumbents were Democrats Herb Conaway, who was re-elected with 30.98% of the vote in 2021, and Carol Murphy, who was re-elected with 30.60% of the vote in 2021. Joe Biden won this district by 65.27% in 2020.

=== Democratic primary ===
==== Nominees ====
- Herb Conaway, incumbent Assemblymember
- Carol Murphy, incumbent Assemblymember

==== Endorsements ====
Herb Conaway (incumbent)

Labor unions

- New Jersey AFL–CIO (co-endorsement with Murphy)
- New Jersey Education Association (co-endorsement with Murphy)

Organizations

- New Jersey League of Conservation Voters (co-endorsement with Murphy)
Carol Murphy (incumbent)

Labor unions

- New Jersey AFL–CIO (co-endorsement with Conaway)
- New Jersey Education Association (co-endorsement with Conaway)

Organizations

- New Jersey League of Conservation Voters (co-endorsement with Conaway)

==== Results ====
Democratic primary
Party	Candidate	Votes	%
Democratic	Herb Conaway (incumbent)	12,412	50.3%
Democratic	Carol Murphy (incumbent)	12,261	49.7%
Total votes		24,673	100.0%

=== Republican primary ===
==== Nominees ====
- Eileen Bleistine, activist
- Douglas Dillon, former Moorestown Zoning Board member

==== Results ====
Republican primary
Party	Candidate	Votes	%
Republican	Douglas Dillon	4,132	50.2%
Republican	Eileen Bleistine	4,098	49.8%
Total votes		8,230	100.0%

=== General election ===
==== Predictions ====
Source	Seat	Ranking	As of
Elections Daily	Seat 1	Safe D	October 22, 2023
Elections Daily	Seat 2	Safe D	October 22, 2023
New Jersey Globe	Seat 1	Solid D	November 2, 2023
New Jersey Globe	Seat 2	Solid D	November 2, 2023

==== Results ====
7th Legislative District general election, 2023
Party	Candidate	Votes	%
Democratic	Herbert C. Conaway Jr. (incumbent)	32,608	33.5
Democratic	Carol Murphy (incumbent)	31,936	32.8
Republican	Douglas Dillon	16,368	16.8
Republican	Eileen Bleistine	16,350	16.8
Total votes		97,262	100.0
Democratic hold			

== District 8 ==
The incumbents were Republicans Michael Torrissi Jr., who was elected with 26.45% of the vote in 2021, and Brandon Umba, who was elected with 25.52% of the vote in 2021. Joe Biden won this district by 51.75% in 2020.

=== Republican primary ===
==== Nominees ====
- Michael Torrissi Jr., incumbent Assemblymember
- Brandon Umba, incumbent Assemblymember

==== Endorsements ====
Michael Torrissi Jr. (incumbent)

Labor unions

- New Jersey AFL–CIO (co-endorsement with Umba)
Brandon Umba (incumbent)

Labor unions

- New Jersey AFL–CIO (co-endorsement with Torrissi)
- New Jersey Education Association (co-endorsement with Angelozzi)

==== Results ====
Republican primary
Party	Candidate	Votes	%
Republican	Michael Torrissi Jr. (incumbent)	7,435	50.7%
Republican	Brandon Umba (incumbent)	7,241	49.3%
Total votes		14,676	100.0%

=== Democratic primary ===
==== Nominees ====
- Anthony Angelozzi, president of the Hammonton Education Association
- Andrea Katz, Chesterfield Township Democratic Municipal Chair

==== Declined ====
- Rue Ryan, former Deputy Mayor of Lumberton

==== Endorsements ====
Anthony Angelozzi

Labor unions

- New Jersey Education Association (co-endorsement with Umba)

Organizations

- New Jersey League of Conservation Voters (co-endorsement with Katz)
Andrea Katz

Organizations

- New Jersey League of Conservation Voters (co-endorsement with Angelozzi)

==== Results ====
Democratic primary
Party	Candidate	Votes	%
Democratic	Andrea Katz	8,165	50.5%
Democratic	Anthony Angelozzi	8,000	49.5%
Total votes		16,165	100.0%

=== General election ===
==== Predictions ====
Source	Seat	Ranking	As of
Elections Daily	Seat 1	Likely R	October 22, 2023
Elections Daily	Seat 2	Lean R	October 22, 2023
New Jersey Globe	Seat 1	Lean R	November 2, 2023
New Jersey Globe	Seat 2	Lean R	November 2, 2023

==== Results ====
8th Legislative District general election, 2023
Party	Candidate	Votes	%
Republican	Michael Torrissi Jr. (incumbent)	27,881	25.3%
Democratic	Andrea Katz	27,636	25.1%
Democratic	Anthony Angelozzi	27,438	24.9%
Republican	Brandon Umba (incumbent)	27,384	24.8%
Total votes		110,339	100.0
Republican hold			
Democratic gain from Republican			

== District 9 ==
The incumbents were Republicans Brian E. Rumpf, who was re-elected with 35.13% of the vote in 2021, and DiAnne Gove, who was re-elected with 34.46% of the vote in 2021. Donald Trump won this district by 62.16% in 2020.

=== Republican primary ===
==== Nominees ====
- Greg Myhre, Mayor of Stafford Township
- Brian E. Rumpf, incumbent Assemblymember

==== Withdrawn ====
- James Byrnes, Berkeley Township Councilmember
- Mark Dykoff, Lacey Township Committeemember
- DiAnne Gove, incumbent Assemblymember
- Timothy McDonald, Mayor of Lacey Township
- John Novak, former mayor of Barnegat Township
- Valerie Smith, Administrator of Ocean Academy Charter School

==== Endorsements ====
DiAnne Gove (withdrawn)

State legislators

- Christopher J. Connors, New Jersey State Senator from the 9th district (2008–present) and former New Jersey General Assemblymember from the 9th district (1990–2008) (co-endorsement with Rumpf)
Brian E. Rumpf (incumbent)

State legislators

- Christopher J. Connors, New Jersey State Senator from the 9th district (2008–present) and former New Jersey General Assemblymember from the 9th district (1990–2008) (co-endorsement with Gove)

Labor unions

- New Jersey Education Association

==== Convention results ====
Ocean County Republican convention
Party	Candidate	Votes	%
Republican	Brian E. Rumpf (incumbent)	96	43.8%
Republican	Greg Myhre	67	30.6%
Republican	DiAnne Gove (incumbent)	56	25.6%
Total votes		219	100.0%

==== Primary results ====
Republican primary
Party	Candidate	Votes	%
Republican	Brian E. Rumpf (incumbent)	11,516	50.9%
Republican	Greg Myhre	11,124	49.1%
Total votes		22,640	100.0%

=== Democratic primary ===
==== Nominees ====
- Joseph Atura, teacher
- Sarah Collins, candidate for this seat in 2019

==== Endorsements ====
Joseph Atura

Organizations

- New Jersey League of Conservation Voters

==== Results ====
Democratic primary
Party	Candidate	Votes	%
Democratic	Sarah Collins	6,807	50.5%
Democratic	Joseph Atura	6,678	49.5%
Total votes		13,485	100.0%

=== General election ===
==== Predictions ====
Source	Seat	Ranking	As of
Elections Daily	Seat 1	Safe R	October 22, 2023
Elections Daily	Seat 2	Safe R	October 22, 2023
New Jersey Globe	Seat 1	Solid R	November 2, 2023
New Jersey Globe	Seat 2	Solid R	November 2, 2023

==== Results ====
9th Legislative District general election, 2023
Party	Candidate	Votes	%
Republican	Brian E. Rumpf (incumbent)	37,559	34.0
Republican	Greg Myhre	36,342	32.9
Democratic	Sarah Collins	18,374	16.6
Democratic	Joseph Atura	17,205	15.6
Green	Barry Bendar	979	0.8
Total votes		110,459	100.0
Republican hold			
Republican hold			

== District 10 ==
The incumbents were Republicans Gregory P. McGuckin, who was re-elected with 34.61% of the vote in 2021, and John Catalano, who was re-elected with 34.36% of the vote in 2021. Donald Trump won this district by 60.34% in 2020.

=== Republican primary ===
==== Nominees ====
- Paul Kanitra, Mayor of Point Pleasant Beach
- Gregory P. McGuckin, incumbent Assemblymember

==== Withdrawn ====
- Geri Ambrosio, former Toms River Republican Club president and candidate for this seat in 2021 (ran for mayor of Toms River)
- John Catalano, incumbent Assemblymember (running for mayor of Brick Township)
- Ashley Lamb, Toms River School Board member
- Cathy Lindenbaum, former president of the New Jersey PTA and former Brick Township School Board member
- Ruthanne Scaturro, Vice Chair of the Ocean County Republican Party and former Brick Township Councilmember

==== Declined ====
- Samantha DeAlmeida, president of the Associated Builders and Contractors of New Jersey and candidate for this seat in 2019
- Justin Lamb, Toms River Councilmember

==== Endorsements ====
Declined to endorse

State legislators

- James W. Holzapfel, New Jersey State Senator from the 10th district (2012–present) and former New Jersey General Assemblymember from the 10th district (1994–2012)

==== Convention results ====
Ocean County Republican convention
Party	Candidate	Votes	%
Republican	Gregory P. McGuckin (incumbent)	63	36.4%
Republican	Paul Kanitra	50	28.9%
Republican	Ruthanne Scaturro	35	20.2%
Republican	Ashley Lamb	25	14.4%
Total votes		173	100.0%

==== Primary results ====
Republican primary
Party	Candidate	Votes	%
Republican	Gregory P. McGuckin (incumbent)	10,767	50.5%
Republican	Paul Kanitra	10,545	49.5%
Total votes		21,312	100.0%

=== Democratic primary ===
==== Nominees ====
- John LaMacchia, retired state worker
- Emma Mammano, Vice Chair of the Ocean County Democratic Party

==== Endorsements ====
Emma Mammano

Labor unions

- New Jersey Education Association

==== Results ====
Democratic primary
Party	Candidate	Votes	%
Democratic	Emma Mammano	5,181	50.6%
Democratic	John LaMacchia	5,067	49.4%
Total votes		10,248	100.0%

=== General election ===
==== Predictions ====
Source	Seat	Ranking	As of
Elections Daily	Seat 1	Safe R	October 22, 2023
Elections Daily	Seat 2	Safe R	October 22, 2023
New Jersey Globe	Seat 1	Solid R	November 2, 2023
New Jersey Globe	Seat 2	Solid R	November 2, 2023

==== Results ====
10th Legislative District general election, 2023
Party	Candidate	Votes	%
Republican	Gregory P. McGuckin (incumbent)	34,805	33.0
Republican	Paul Kanitra	34,098	32.4
Democratic	Emma Mammano	18,529	17.6
Democratic	John LaMacchia	17,958	17.0
Total votes		105,390	100.0
Republican hold			
Republican hold			

== District 11 ==
The incumbents were Republicans Kimberly Eulner, who was elected with 24.94% of the vote in 2021, and Marilyn Piperno, who was elected with 25.05% of the vote in 2021. Joe Biden won this district by 56.18% in 2020.

=== Republican primary ===
==== Nominees ====
- Kimberly Eulner, incumbent Assemblymember
- Marilyn Piperno, incumbent Assemblymember

==== Results ====
Republican primary
Party	Candidate	Votes	%
Republican	Marilyn Piperno (incumbent)	4,258	50.2%
Republican	Kimberly Eulner (incumbent)	4,228	49.8%
Total votes		8,486	100.0%

=== Democratic primary ===
==== Nominees ====
- Margie Donlon, deputy mayor of Ocean Township
- Luanne Peterpaul, former Municipal Court Judge

==== Endorsements ====
Margie Donlon

Labor unions

- New Jersey AFL–CIO (co-endorsement with Peterpaul)
- New Jersey Education Association (co-endorsement with Peterpaul)

Organizations

- New Jersey League of Conservation Voters (co-endorsement with Peterpaul)
Luanne Peterpaul

Labor unions

- New Jersey AFL–CIO (co-endorsement with Donlon)
- New Jersey Education Association (co-endorsement with Donlon)

Organizations

- LGBTQ Victory Fund
- LPAC
- New Jersey League of Conservation Voters (co-endorsement with Donlon)

==== Results ====
Democratic primary
Party	Candidate	Votes	%
Democratic	Margie Donlon	8,086	50.2%
Democratic	Luanne Peterpaul	8,011	49.8%
Total votes		16,097	100.0%

=== General election ===
==== Predictions ====
Source	Seat	Ranking	As of
Elections Daily	Seat 1	Tossup	October 22, 2023
Elections Daily	Seat 2	Tossup	October 22, 2023
New Jersey Globe	Seat 1	Tossup	November 2, 2023
New Jersey Globe	Seat 2	Tossup	November 2, 2023

==== Results ====
11th Legislative District general election, 2023
Party	Candidate	Votes	%
Democratic	Margie Donlon	32,005	28.6
Democratic	Luanne Peterpaul	31,636	28.3
Republican	Marilyn Piperno (incumbent)	24,230	21.7
Republican	Kimberly Eulner (incumbent)	24,025	21.5
Total votes		111,896	100.0
Democratic gain from Republican			
Democratic gain from Republican			

== District 12 ==
The incumbents were Republicans Robert D. Clifton, who was re-elected with 32.52% of the vote in 2021, and Alex Sauickie, who was elected with 61.06% of the vote in a 2022 special election. Donald Trump won this district with 56.48% of the vote in 2020.

=== Republican primary ===
==== Nominees ====
- Robert D. Clifton, incumbent Assemblymember
- Alex Sauickie, incumbent Assemblymember

==== Eliminated in primary ====
- Salvatore Giordano, president of the Old Bridge Township Board of Education

==== Endorsements ====
Robert D. Clifton (incumbent)

Labor unions

- New Jersey Education Association (co-endorsement with Sauickie)

Organizations

- New Jersey League of Conservation Voters
Alex Sauickie (incumbent)

Labor unions

- New Jersey Education Association (co-endorsement with Clifton)

==== Results ====
Republican primary
Party	Candidate	Votes	%
Republican	Robert D. Clifton (incumbent)	5,297	45.1%
Republican	Alex Sauickie (incumbent)	5,056	43.1%
Republican	Salvatore Giordano	1,387	11.8%
Total votes		11,740	100.0%

=== Democratic primary ===
==== Nominees ====
- Raya Arbiol, veteran
- Paul Sarti, candidate for this seat in 2022

==== Endorsements ====
Raya Arbiol

Labor unions

- New Jersey AFL–CIO (co-endorsement with Sarti)

Organizations

- LPAC
Paul Sarti

Labor unions

- New Jersey AFL–CIO (co-endorsement with Arbiol)

==== Results ====
Democratic primary
Party	Candidate	Votes	%
Democratic	Paul Sarti	4,861	50.4%
Democratic	Raya Arbiol	4,789	49.6%
Total votes		9,650	100.0%

=== General election ===
==== Predictions ====
Source	Seat	Ranking	As of
Elections Daily	Seat 1	Safe R	October 22, 2023
Elections Daily	Seat 2	Safe R	October 22, 2023
New Jersey Globe	Seat 1	Solid R	November 2, 2023
New Jersey Globe	Seat 2	Solid R	November 2, 2023

==== Results ====
12th Legislative District general election, 2023
Party	Candidate	Votes	%
Republican	Robert D. Clifton (incumbent)	28,200	32.0
Republican	Alex Sauickie (incumbent)	27,061	30.7
Democratic	Paul Sarti	16,767	19.0
Democratic	Raya Arbiol	16,164	18.3
Total votes		88,192	100.0
Republican hold			
Republican hold			

== District 13 ==
The incumbents were Republicans Vicky Flynn, who was elected with 30.45% of the vote in 2021, and Gerard P. Scharfenberger, who was re-elected with 30.76% of the vote in 2021. Donald Trump won this district by 52.82% in 2020.

=== Republican primary ===
==== Nominees ====
- Vicky Flynn, incumbent Assemblymember
- Gerard P. Scharfenberger, incumbent Assemblymember

==== Endorsements ====
Vicky Flynn (incumbent)

Labor unions

- New Jersey Education Association (co-endorsement with Eschelbach)

==== Results ====
Republican primary
Party	Candidate	Votes	%
Republican	Vicky Flynn (incumbent)	6,330	50.1%
Republican	Gerard P. Scharfenberger (incumbent)	6,295	49.9%
Total votes		12,625	100.0%

=== Democratic primary ===
==== Nominees ====
- Paul Eschelbach
- Danielle Mastropiero

==== Disqualified ====
- Koby Biran

==== Endorsements ====
Paul Eschelbach

Labor unions

- New Jersey Education Association (co-endorsement with Flynn)

==== Results ====
Democratic primary
Party	Candidate	Votes	%
Democratic	Danielle Mastropiero	5,335	92.1%
Democratic	Paul Eschelbach (write-in)	250	4.3%
Democratic	Other write-ins	208	3.6%
Total votes		5,793	100.0%

=== General election ===
==== Predictions ====
Source	Seat	Ranking	As of
Elections Daily	Seat 1	Safe R	October 22, 2023
Elections Daily	Seat 2	Safe R	October 22, 2023
New Jersey Globe	Seat 1	Solid R	November 2, 2023
New Jersey Globe	Seat 2	Solid R	November 2, 2023

==== Results ====
13th Legislative District general election, 2023
Party	Candidate	Votes	%
Republican	Vicky Flynn (incumbent)	30,744	28.9
Republican	Gerard P. Scharfenberger (incumbent)	30,474	28.6
Democratic	Danielle Mastropiero	22,440	21.1
Democratic	Paul Eschelbach	21,655	20.3
Libertarian	John Morrison	1,241	1.2
Total votes		106,554	100.0
Republican hold			
Republican hold			

== District 14 ==
The incumbents were Democrats Wayne P. DeAngelo, who was re-elected with 28.29% of the vote in 2021, and Daniel R. Benson, who was re-elected with 27.85% of the vote in 2021. Joe Biden won this district by 58.69% in 2020.

=== Democratic primary ===
==== Nominees ====
- Wayne P. DeAngelo, incumbent Assemblymember
- Tennille McCoy, former Assistant Commissioner of the New Jersey Department of Labor and Workforce Development

==== Withdrawn ====
- Rick Carabelli, Franklin Township Municipal Tax Assessor (2009–present)

==== Declined ====
- Daniel R. Benson, incumbent Assemblymember (running for Mercer County Executive)

==== Endorsements ====
Tennille McCoy

Labor unions

- New Jersey AFL–CIO (co-endorsement with DeAngelo)
- New Jersey Education Association (co-endorsement with DeAngelo)

Organizations

- New Jersey League of Conservation Voters (co-endorsement with DeAngelo)
Wayne P. DeAngelo (incumbent)

State legislators

- Daniel R. Benson, New Jersey General Assemblymember from the 14th district (2011–present) and former Mercer County Commissioner (2008–2011)

Labor unions

- New Jersey AFL–CIO (co-endorsement with McCoy)
- New Jersey Education Association (co-endorsement with McCoy)

Organizations

- New Jersey League of Conservation Voters (co-endorsement with McCoy)
Declined to endorse

State legislators

- Wayne P. DeAngelo, New Jersey General Assemblymember from the 14th district (2008–present)
- Linda R. Greenstein, New Jersey State Senator from the 14th district (2010–present) and former New Jersey General Assemblymember from the 14th district (2000–2010)

==== Convention results ====
Mercer County Democratic convention
Party	Candidate	Votes	%
Democratic	Rick Carabelli	120	35.6%
Democratic	Tennille McCoy	111	32.9%
Democratic	Wayne P. DeAngelo (incumbent)	106	31.5%
Total votes		337	100.0%

Middlesex County Democratic convention
Party	Candidate	Votes	%
Democratic	Wayne P. DeAngelo (incumbent)	58	40.2%
Democratic	Tennille McCoy	45	31.3%
Democratic	Rick Carabelli	41	28.5%
Total votes		144	100.0%

==== Primary results ====
Democratic primary
Party	Candidate	Votes	%
Democratic	Wayne P. DeAngelo (incumbent)	10,366	50.5%
Democratic	Tennille McCoy	10,156	49.5%
Total votes		20,522	100.0%

=== Republican primary ===
==== Nominees ====
- Adam Elias, attorney
- Skye Gilmartin, former Hightstown Councilmember

==== Eliminated in primary ====
- Bina Shah, nominee for this seat in 2019 and 2021

==== Results ====
Republican primary
Party	Candidate	Votes	%
Republican	Adam Elias	4,233	46.2%
Republican	Skye Gilmartin	4,188	45.7%
Republican	Bina Shah	748	8.2%
Total votes		9,169	100.0%

=== General election ===
==== Predictions ====
Source	Seat	Ranking	As of
Elections Daily	Seat 1	Safe D	October 22, 2023
Elections Daily	Seat 2	Likely D	October 22, 2023
New Jersey Globe	Seat 1	Solid D	November 2, 2023
New Jersey Globe	Seat 2	Likely D	November 2, 2023

==== Results ====
14th Legislative District general election, 2023
Party	Candidate	Votes	%
Democratic	Wayne P. DeAngelo (incumbent)	32,843	30.3
Democratic	Tennille McCoy	31,181	28.8
Republican	Adam Elias	22,223	20.5
Republican	Skye Gilmartin	22,174	20.5
Total votes		108,421	100.0
Democratic hold			
Democratic hold			

== District 15 ==
The incumbents were Democrats Verlina Reynolds-Jackson, who was re-elected with 40.34% of the vote in 2021, and Anthony S. Verrelli, who was re-elected with 40.66% of the vote in 2021. Joe Biden won this district by 73.29% in 2020.

=== Democratic primary ===
==== Nominees ====
- Verlina Reynolds-Jackson, incumbent Assemblymember
- Anthony S. Verrelli, incumbent Assemblymember

==== Endorsements ====
Verlina Reynolds-Jackson (incumbent)

Labor unions

- New Jersey AFL–CIO (co-endorsement with Verrelli)
- New Jersey Education Association (co-endorsement with Verrelli)

Organizations

- New Jersey League of Conservation Voters (co-endorsement with Verrelli)
Anthony S. Verrelli (incumbent)

Labor unions

- New Jersey AFL–CIO (co-endorsement with Reynolds-Jackson)
- New Jersey Education Association (co-endorsement with Reynolds-Jackson)

Organizations

- New Jersey League of Conservation Voters (co-endorsement with Reynolds-Jackson)

==== Results ====
Democratic primary
Party	Candidate	Votes	%
Democratic	Verlina Reynolds-Jackson (incumbent)	10,012	50.8%
Democratic	Anthony S. Verrelli (incumbent)	9,687	49.2%
Total votes		19,699	100.0%

=== Republican primary ===
==== Nominee ====
- Michel F. Hurtado, student at Kean University, attendant at the Mercer County Improvement Authority, candidate for Mercer County Commissioner in 2021

==== Withdrawn ====
- Pedro Reyes, write-in candidate, Independent candidate for this district in 2021

==== Results ====
Republican primary
Party	Candidate	Votes	%
Republican	Michel F. Hurtado	2,343	94.5%
Republican	Pedro Reyes (write-in)	90	3.6%
Republican	Other write-ins	47	1.9%
Total votes		2,480	100.0%

=== General election ===
==== Predictions ====
Source	Seat	Ranking	As of
Elections Daily	Seat 1	Safe D	October 22, 2023
Elections Daily	Seat 2	Safe D	October 22, 2023
New Jersey Globe	Seat 1	Solid D	November 2, 2023
New Jersey Globe	Seat 2	Solid D	November 2, 2023

==== Results ====
15th Legislative District general election, 2023
Party	Candidate	Votes	%
Democratic	Anthony S. Verrelli (incumbent)	27,669	42.3
Democratic	Verlina Reynolds-Jackson (incumbent)	27,322	41.8
Republican	Michel F. Hurtado	10,371	15.9
Total votes		65,362	100.0
Democratic hold			
Democratic hold			

== District 16 ==
The incumbents were Democrats Roy Freiman, who was re-elected with 26.67% of the vote in 2021, and Sadaf Jaffer, who was elected with 25.71% of the vote in 2021. Joe Biden won this district by 59.64% in 2020.

=== Democratic primary ===
==== Nominees ====
- Mitchelle Drulis, former district director for Tom Malinowski
- Roy Freiman, incumbent Assemblymember

==== Withdrawn ====
- Patricia Taylor Todd, Montgomery Township Committeemember

==== Declined ====
- Dennis Ahn, Montgomery Township Committeemember
- David Cohen, Princeton Councilmember
- Maureen Coxwell, former Deputy Clerk of Somerset County
- Dorothy Dawood, Hunterdon County Democratic Committee Secretary
- Michelle Dowling, Montgomery Township Board of Education member
- Chris Fistonich, cybersecurity analyst and candidate for this seat in 2021
- Leticia Fraga, Princeton Councilmember
- Mark Freda, Mayor of Princeton
- Caitlin Giles-McCormick, former Flemington Council president
- Michael Goldberg, president of the Somerset County Board of Taxation
- Alan Harwick, former president of the Bridgewater-Raritan Regional Board of Education
- Raymond Heck, mayor of Millstone
- Sadaf Jaffer, incumbent Assemblymember
- Bhaveen Jani, former president of the South Asian Bar Association of New Jersey
- Megan Johnson, Clinton Councilmember
- Devra Keenan, mayor of Montgomery Township
- Michele Kidd, Hillsborough Township Democratic Municipal Chair
- Janice Kovach, mayor of Clinton and nominee for New Jersey's 7th congressional district in 2014
- Michelle Pirone Lambros, Princeton Councilmember and candidate for this seat in 2021
- Jane Manner, Vice President of the Princeton Community Democratic Organization
- Leighton Newlin, Princeton Councilmember
- Eve Niedergang, Princeton Councilmember
- Tommy Parker, president of the Princeton Community Democratic Organization
- Deepak Raj, chairman of the New Jersey State Investment Council
- Mia Sacks, Princeton Councilmember
- Afsheen Shamsi, former Council on American–Islamic Relations-New York/New Jersey official
- Neena Singh, deputy mayor of Montgomery Township

==== Endorsements ====
Mitchelle Drulis

Labor unions

- New Jersey AFL–CIO (co-endorsement with Freiman)
- New Jersey Education Association (co-endorsement with Freiman)

Organizations

- New Jersey League of Conservation Voters (co-endorsement with Freiman)
Roy Freiman (incumbent)

Labor unions

- New Jersey AFL–CIO (co-endorsement with Drulis)
- New Jersey Education Association (co-endorsement with Drulis)

Organizations

- New Jersey League of Conservation Voters (co-endorsement with Drulis)

==== Results ====
Democratic primary
Party	Candidate	Votes	%
Democratic	Roy Freiman (incumbent)	9,803	50.1%
Democratic	Mitchelle Drulis	9,759	49.9%
Total votes		19,562	100.0%

=== Republican primary ===
==== Nominees ====
- Ross Traphagen, Clinton Councilmember
- Grace Zhang, accountant

==== Withdrawn ====
- Rosy Thakkar, Montgomery Township Committeemember

==== Results ====
Republican primary
Party	Candidate	Votes	%
Republican	Ross Traphagen	5,946	50.3%
Republican	Grace Zhang	5,873	49.7%
Total votes		11,819	100.0%

=== General election ===
==== Predictions ====
Source	Seat	Ranking	As of
Elections Daily	Seat 1	Likely D	October 22, 2023
Elections Daily	Seat 2	Lean D	October 22, 2023
New Jersey Globe	Seat 1	Lean D	November 2, 2023
New Jersey Globe	Seat 2	Lean D	November 2, 2023

==== Results ====
16th Legislative District general election, 2023
Party	Candidate	Votes	%
Democratic	Roy Freiman (incumbent)	34,188	28.3
Democratic	Mitchelle Drulis	33,642	27.9
Republican	Grace Zhang	26,558	22.0
Republican	Ross Traphagen	26,293	21.8
Total votes		120,663	100.0
Democratic hold			
Democratic hold			

== District 17 ==
The incumbents were Democrats Joseph Danielsen, who was re-elected with 34.19% of the vote in 2021, and Joseph V. Egan, who was re-elected with 34.83% of the vote in 2021. Joe Biden won this district by 72.43% in 2020.

=== Democratic primary ===
==== Nominees ====
- Joseph Danielsen, incumbent Assemblymember
- Kevin Egan, New Brunswick Councilmember and son of incumbent Joseph V. Egan

==== Withdrawn ====
- Joseph V. Egan, incumbent Assemblymember

==== Endorsements ====
Joseph Danielsen (incumbent)

Labor unions

- New Jersey AFL–CIO (co-endorsement with Egan)
- New Jersey Education Association (co-endorsement with Egan)

Organizations

- New Jersey League of Conservation Voters
Joseph V. Egan (withdrawn)

Labor unions

- New Jersey AFL–CIO (co-endorsement with Danielsen)
- New Jersey Education Association (co-endorsement with Danielsen)

==== Results ====
Democratic primary
Party	Candidate	Votes	%
Democratic	Joseph V. Egan (incumbent)	8,920	50.2%
Democratic	Joseph Danielsen (incumbent)	8,859	49.8%
Total votes		17,779	100.0%

=== Republican primary ===
==== Nominees ====
- Susan Hucko
- Dhimant G. Patel

==== Results ====
Republican primary
Party	Candidate	Votes	%
Republican	Susan Hucko	1,684	51.9%
Republican	Dhimant G. Patel	1,562	48.1%
Total votes		3,246	100.0%

=== General election ===
==== Predictions ====
Source	Seat	Ranking	As of
Elections Daily	Seat 1	Safe D	October 22, 2023
Elections Daily	Seat 2	Safe D	October 22, 2023
New Jersey Globe	Seat 1	Solid D	November 2, 2023
New Jersey Globe	Seat 2	Solid D	November 2, 2023

==== Results ====
17th Legislative District general election, 2023
Party	Candidate	Votes	%
Democratic	Kevin Egan	20,159	36.3
Democratic	Joseph Danielsen (incumbent)	20,064	36.2
Republican	Susan Hucko	7,771	14.0
Republican	Dhimant G. Patel	7,473	13.5
Total votes		55,467	100.0
Democratic hold			
Democratic hold			

== District 18 ==
The incumbents were Democrats Robert Karabinchak, who was re-elected with 29.27% of the vote in 2021, and Sterley Stanley, who was re-elected with 28.45% of the vote in 2021. Joe Biden won this district by 60.48% in 2020.

=== Democratic primary ===
==== Nominees ====
- Robert Karabinchak, incumbent Assemblymember
- Sterley Stanley, incumbent Assemblymember

==== Endorsements ====
Robert Karabinchak (incumbent)

Labor unions

- New Jersey AFL–CIO (co-endorsement with Stanley)
- New Jersey Education Association (co-endorsement with Stanley)

Organizations

- New Jersey League of Conservation Voters (co-endorsement with Stanley)
Sterley Stanley (incumbent)

Labor unions

- New Jersey AFL–CIO (co-endorsement with Karabinchak)
- New Jersey Education Association (co-endorsement with Karabinchak)

Organizations

- New Jersey League of Conservation Voters (co-endorsement with Karabinchak)

==== Results ====
Democratic primary
Party	Candidate	Votes	%
Democratic	Robert Karabinchak (incumbent)	13,987	50.2%
Democratic	Sterley Stanley (incumbent)	13,875	49.8%
Total votes		27,862	100.0%

=== Republican primary ===
==== Nominees ====
- Teresa Hutchison
- Joseph Wolak, South Plainfield Councilmember

==== Results ====
Republican primary
Party	Candidate	Votes	%
Republican	Teresa Hutchison	2,999	50.3%
Republican	Joseph Wolak	2,959	49.7%
Total votes		5,958	100.0%

=== General election ===
==== Predictions ====
Source	Seat	Ranking	As of
Elections Daily	Seat 1	Safe D	October 22, 2023
Elections Daily	Seat 2	Safe D	October 22, 2023
New Jersey Globe	Seat 1	Solid D	November 2, 2023
New Jersey Globe	Seat 2	Solid D	November 2, 2023

==== Results ====
18th Legislative District general election, 2023
Party	Candidate	Votes	%
Democratic	Robert Karabinchak (incumbent)	23,362	31.5
Democratic	Sterley Stanley (incumbent)	23,236	31.4
Republican	Teresa Hutchison	13,861	18.7
Republican	Joseph Wolak	13,619	18.4
Total votes		74,078	100.0
Democratic hold			
Democratic hold			

== District 19 ==
The incumbents were Democrats Craig J. Coughlin, who was re-elected with 29.15% of the vote in 2021, and Yvonne Lopez, who was re-elected with 28.63% of the vote in 2021. Joe Biden won this district by 59.16% in 2020.

=== Democratic primary ===
==== Nominees ====
- Craig J. Coughlin, incumbent Assemblymember
- Yvonne Lopez, incumbent Assemblymember

==== Endorsements ====
Craig J. Coughlin (incumbent)

Labor unions

- New Jersey AFL–CIO (co-endorsement with Lopez)
- New Jersey Education Association (co-endorsement with Lopez)

Organizations

- New Jersey League of Conservation Voters
Yvonne Lopez (incumbent)

Labor unions

- New Jersey AFL–CIO (co-endorsement with Coughlin)
- New Jersey Education Association (co-endorsement with Coughlin)

==== Results ====
Democratic primary
Party	Candidate	Votes	%
Democratic	Craig J. Coughlin (incumbent)	8,492	50.2%
Democratic	Yvonne Lopez (incumbent)	8,426	49.8%
Total votes		16,918	100.0%

=== Republican primary ===
==== Nominees ====
- Marilyn Colon
- Sam Raval

==== Results ====
Republican primary
Party	Candidate	Votes	%
Republican	Marilyn Colon	2,342	50.9%
Republican	Sam Raval	2,261	49.1%
Total votes		4,603	100.0%

=== General election ===
==== Predictions ====
Source	Seat	Ranking	As of
Elections Daily	Seat 1	Safe D	October 22, 2023
Elections Daily	Seat 2	Safe D	October 22, 2023
New Jersey Globe	Seat 1	Solid D	November 2, 2023
New Jersey Globe	Seat 2	Solid D	November 2, 2023

==== Results ====
19th Legislative District general election, 2023
Party	Candidate	Votes	%
Democratic	Craig J. Coughlin (incumbent)	18,808	31.4
Democratic	Yvonne Lopez (incumbent)	18,254	30.5
Republican	Marilyn Colon	11,496	19.2
Republican	Sam Raval	10,740	17.9
Libertarian	David Diez	619	1.0
Total votes		59,917	100.0
Democratic hold			
Democratic hold			

== District 20 ==
The incumbents were Democrats Reginald Atkins, who was elected with 49.23% of the vote in 2021, and Annette Quijano, who was re-elected with 50.77% of the vote in 2021. Joe Biden won this district by 71.03% in 2020.

=== Democratic primary ===
==== Nominees ====
- Reginald Atkins, incumbent Assemblymember
- Annette Quijano, incumbent Assemblymember

==== Eliminated in primary ====
- Charles Mitchell
- Myrlene Thelot

==== Endorsements ====
Reginald Atkins (incumbent)

Labor unions

- New Jersey AFL–CIO (co-endorsement with Quijano)
- New Jersey Education Association (co-endorsement with Quijano)
Annette Quijano (incumbent)

Labor unions

- New Jersey AFL–CIO (co-endorsement with Atkins)
- New Jersey Education Association (co-endorsement with Atkins)

==== Results ====
Democratic primary
Party	Candidate	Votes	%
Democratic	Annette Quijano (incumbent)	7,014	39.1%
Democratic	Reginald Atkins (incumbent)	6,711	37.4%
Democratic	Myrlene Thelot	2,119	11.8%
Democratic	Charles Mitchell	2,106	11.7%
Total votes		17,950	100.0%

=== Republican primary ===
==== Nominee ====
- Ramon Hernandez

==== Results ====
Republican primary
Party	Candidate	Votes	%
Republican	Ramon Hernandez	996	95.7%
Republican	Write-in	45	4.3%
Total votes		1,041	100.0%

=== General election ===
==== Predictions ====
Source	Seat	Ranking	As of
Elections Daily	Seat 1	Safe D	October 22, 2023
Elections Daily	Seat 2	Safe D	October 22, 2023
New Jersey Globe	Seat 1	Solid D	November 2, 2023
New Jersey Globe	Seat 2	Solid D	November 2, 2023

==== Results ====
20th Legislative District general election, 2023
Party	Candidate	Votes	%
Democratic	Annette Quijano (incumbent)	12,280	42.7
Democratic	Reginald Atkins (incumbent)	12,104	42.1
Republican	Ramon Hernandez	4,380	15.2
Total votes		28,764	100.0
Democratic hold			
Democratic hold			

== District 21 ==
The incumbents were Republicans Michele Matsikoudis, who was elected with 26.28% of the vote in 2021, and Nancy Muñoz, who was re-elected with 26.99% of the vote in 2021. Joe Biden won this district by 58.07% in 2020.

=== Republican primary ===
==== Nominees ====
- Michele Matsikoudis, incumbent Assemblymember
- Nancy Muñoz, incumbent Assemblymember

==== Endorsements ====
Michele Matsikoudis (incumbent)

Labor unions

- New Jersey Education Association

==== Results ====
Republican primary
Party	Candidate	Votes	%
Republican	Nancy Muñoz (incumbent)	8,705	50.0%
Republican	Michele Matsikoudis (incumbent)	8,693	50.0%
Total votes		17,398	100.0%

=== Democratic primary ===
==== Nominees ====
- Elizabeth Graner, Bernards Township Democratic Municipal Chair, nominee for this district in 2021
- Chris Weber, mayor and Township Committeeman of Springfield, Detective Sergeant for the Newark South District Narcotics Unit (retired), and Detective Supervisor for the Newark Police Department School Safety Task Force (retired)

==== Results ====
Democratic primary
Party	Candidate	Votes	%
Democratic	Elizabeth A. Graner	8,552	50.5%
Democratic	Chris Weber	8,375	49.5%
Total votes		16,927	100.0%

=== General election ===
==== Predictions ====
Source	Seat	Ranking	As of
Elections Daily	Seat 1	Lean R	October 22, 2023
Elections Daily	Seat 2	Lean R	October 22, 2023
New Jersey Globe	Seat 1	Likely R	November 2, 2023
New Jersey Globe	Seat 2	Likely R	November 2, 2023

==== Results ====
21st Legislative District general election, 2023
Party	Candidate	Votes	%
Republican	Nancy Muñoz (incumbent)	33,146	26.1
Republican	Michele Matsikoudis (incumbent)	32,607	25.7
Democratic	Elizabeth A. Graner	30,643	24.1
Democratic	Chris Weber	30,615	24.1
Total votes		127,011	100.0
Republican hold			
Republican hold			

== District 22 ==
The incumbents were Democrats Linda Carter, who was re-elected with 31.26% of the vote in 2021, and James Kennedy, who was re-elected with 30.60% of the vote in 2021. Joe Biden won this district by 67.26% in 2020.

=== Democratic primary ===
==== Nominees ====
- Linda Carter, incumbent Assemblymember
- James Kennedy, incumbent Assemblymember

==== Endorsements ====
Linda Carter (incumbent)

Labor unions

- New Jersey AFL–CIO (co-endorsement with Kennedy)
- New Jersey Education Association (co-endorsement with Kennedy)

Organizations

- New Jersey League of Conservation Voters (co-endorsement with Kennedy)
James Kennedy (incumbent)

Labor unions

- New Jersey AFL–CIO (co-endorsement with Carter)
- New Jersey Education Association (co-endorsement with Carter)

Organizations

- New Jersey League of Conservation Voters (co-endorsement with Carter)

==== Results ====
Democratic primary
Party	Candidate	Votes	%
Democratic	Linda Carter (incumbent)	10,084	51.0%
Democratic	James Kennedy (incumbent)	9,681	49.0%
Total votes		19,765	100.0%

=== Republican primary ===
==== Nominees ====
- Lisa Fabrizio, Linden Republican Municipal Chair
- Patricia Quattrocchi, former mayor of Garwood

==== Results ====
Republican primary
Party	Candidate	Votes	%
Republican	Lisa Fabrizio	2,353	50.5%
Republican	Patricia Quattrocchi	2,302	49.5%
Total votes		4,655	100.0%

=== General election ===
==== Predictions ====
Source	Seat	Ranking	As of
Elections Daily	Seat 1	Safe D	October 22, 2023
Elections Daily	Seat 2	Safe D	October 22, 2023
New Jersey Globe	Seat 1	Solid D	November 2, 2023
New Jersey Globe	Seat 2	Solid D	November 2, 2023

==== Results ====
22nd Legislative District general election, 2023
Party	Candidate	Votes	%
Democratic	Linda Carter (incumbent)	23,710	33.3
Democratic	James Kennedy (incumbent)	23,123	32.5
Republican	Lisa Fabrizio	12,272	17.2
Republican	Patricia Quattrocchi	12,087	17.0
Total votes		71,192	100.0
Democratic hold			
Democratic hold			

== District 23 ==
The incumbents were Republicans John DiMaio, who was re-elected with 30.71% of the vote in 2021, and Erik Peterson, who was re-elected with 29.90% of the vote in 2021. Donald Trump won this district by 51.92% in 2020.

=== Republican primary ===
==== Nominees ====
- John DiMaio, incumbent Assemblymember
- Erik Peterson, incumbent Assemblymember

==== Results ====
Republican primary
Party	Candidate	Votes	%
Republican	John DiMaio (incumbent)	8,545	50.4%
Republican	Erik Peterson (incumbent)	8,404	49.6%
Total votes		16,949	100.0%

=== Democratic primary ===
==== Nominees ====
- Guy Citron
- Margaret Weinberger, former president of the Somerset County Federation of Democratic Women

==== Results ====
Democratic primary
Party	Candidate	Votes	%
Democratic	Margaret Weinberger	6,891	51.0%
Democratic	Guy Citron	6,619	49.0%
Total votes		13,510	100.0%

=== General election ===
==== Predictions ====
Source	Seat	Ranking	As of
Elections Daily	Seat 1	Safe R	October 22, 2023
Elections Daily	Seat 2	Safe R	October 22, 2023
New Jersey Globe	Seat 1	Solid R	November 2, 2023
New Jersey Globe	Seat 2	Solid R	November 2, 2023

==== Results ====
23rd Legislative District general election, 2023
Party	Candidate	Votes	%
Republican	John DiMaio (incumbent)	31,122	29.5
Republican	Erik Peterson (incumbent)	30,366	28.8
Democratic	Tyler Powell	22,118	21.0
Democratic	Guy Citron	21,981	20.8
Total votes		105,587	100.0
Republican hold			
Republican hold			

== District 24 ==
The incumbents were Republicans Parker Space, who was re-elected with 35.60% of the vote in 2021, and Hal Wirths, who was re-elected with 32.66% of the vote in 2021. Donald Trump won this district by 56.17% in 2020.

=== Republican primary ===
==== Nominees ====
- Dawn Fantasia, Sussex County Commissioner
- Mike Inganamort, Mayor of Chester

==== Eliminated in primary ====
- Josh Aikens, president of the Lafayette Township Board of Education
- Rob Kovic, former Ridgefield Park Councilmember and candidate for New Jersey's 11th congressional district in 2022
- Jason Sarnoski, Warren County Commissioner

==== Withdrawn ====
- Enrico Fioranelli, gym owner
- Steve Lonegan, former mayor of Bogota (1996–2007), candidate for New Jersey's 5th congressional district in 2018, candidate for New Jersey's 3rd congressional district in 2014, nominee for U.S. Senate in 2013, and candidate for Governor of New Jersey in 2005 and 2009 (ran for State Senate)

==== Declined ====
- Christopher Carney, Sussex County Commissioner
- Heather Darling, Morris County Surrogate
- Michael B. Lavery, former Chair of the New Jersey Republican State Committee (2017; 2020–2021) and former mayor of Hackettstown (2005–2011)
- Matt Murello, Mayor of Washington Township
- Parker Space, incumbent Assemblymember (running for State Senate)
- Hal Wirths, incumbent Assemblymember

==== Endorsements ====
Dawn Fantasia

State legislators

- Steve Oroho, Minority Leader of the New Jersey Senate (2022–present) and New Jersey State Senator from the New Jersey's 24th legislative district (2008–present)
- Hal Wirths, New Jersey General Assemblymember from the New Jersey's 24th legislative district (2018–present)
Mike Inganamort

State legislators

- Steve Oroho, Minority Leader of the New Jersey Senate (2022–present) and New Jersey State Senator from the New Jersey's 24th legislative district (2008–present)
- Hal Wirths, New Jersey General Assemblymember from the New Jersey's 24th legislative district (2018–present)
Steve Lonegan (withdrawn)

Local officials

- Michael J. Doherty, Warren County Surrogate (2022–present), former New Jersey State Senator from the New Jersey's 23rd legislative district (2009–2022), former New Jersey General Assemblymember from the New Jersey's 23rd legislative district (2002–2009), and former Warren County Commissioner (2001–2004)

==== Convention results ====
Morris County Republican convention
Party	Candidate	Votes	%
Republican	Mike Inganamort	78	41.3%
Republican	Dawn Fantasia	69	36.5%
Republican	Jason Sarnoski	25	13.2%
Republican	Josh Aikens	17	9.0%
Total votes		189	100.0%

==== Primary results ====
Republican primary
Party	Candidate	Votes	%
Republican	Dawn Fantasia	8,511	26.6%
Republican	Mike Inganamort	7,976	25.0%
Republican	Josh Aikens	7,120	22.3%
Republican	Jason Sarnoski	6,726	21.1%
Republican	Rob Kovic	1,612	5.0%
Total votes		31,945	100.0%

=== Democratic primary ===
==== Nominee ====
- Alicia Sharm, candidate for Morris County Commissioner in 2022

==== Withdrawn ====
- Veronica Fernandez, perennial candidate (running as an independent)

==== Results ====
Democratic primary
Party	Candidate	Votes	%
Democratic	Alicia Sharm	5,674	96.8%
Democratic	Write-in	186	3.2%
Total votes		5,860	100.0%

=== General election ===
==== Predictions ====
Source	Seat	Ranking	As of
Elections Daily	Seat 1	Safe R	October 22, 2023
Elections Daily	Seat 2	Safe R	October 22, 2023
New Jersey Globe	Seat 1	Solid R	November 2, 2023
New Jersey Globe	Seat 2	Solid R	November 2, 2023

==== Results ====
24th Legislative District general election, 2023
Party	Candidate	Votes	%
Republican	Dawn Fantasia	31,994	36.0
Republican	Mike Inganamort	31,174	35.0
Democratic	Alicia Sharm	18,722	21.0
End The Corruption!	Veronica Fernandez	7,184	8.1
Total votes		89,074	100.0
Republican hold			
Republican hold			

== District 25 ==
The incumbents were Republicans Brian Bergen, who was re-elected with 27.85% of the vote in 2021, and Aura K. Dunn, who was re-elected with 28.25% of the vote in 2021. Joe Biden won this district by 52.52% in 2020.

=== Republican primary ===
==== Nominees ====
- Christian E. Barranco, incumbent Assemblymember from the 26th district
- Aura K. Dunn, incumbent Assemblymember

==== Endorsements ====
Christian E. Barranco (incumbent)

Labor unions

- New Jersey AFL–CIO (co-endorsement with Dunn)
Aura K. Dunn (incumbent)

Labor unions

- New Jersey AFL–CIO (co-endorsement with Barranco)
- New Jersey Education Association

==== Results ====
Republican primary
Party	Candidate	Votes	%
Republican	Aura K. Dunn (incumbent)	9,382	50.2%
Republican	Christian E. Barranco (incumbent)	9,297	49.8%
Total votes		18,679	100.0%

=== Democratic primary ===
==== Nominees ====
- Diane Salvatore, journalist
- Jonathan Torres, candidate for Randolph Council

==== Endorsements ====
Dianne Salvatore

Organizations

- LPAC

==== Results ====
Democratic primary
Party	Candidate	Votes	%
Democratic	Diane Salvatore	7,977	50.2%
Democratic	Jonathan Torres	7,899	49.8%
Total votes		15,876	100.0%

=== General election ===
==== Predictions ====
Source	Seat	Ranking	As of
Elections Daily	Seat 1	Likely R	October 22, 2023
Elections Daily	Seat 2	Likely R	October 22, 2023
New Jersey Globe	Seat 1	Likely R	November 2, 2023
New Jersey Globe	Seat 2	Likely R	November 2, 2023

==== Results ====
25th Legislative District general election, 2023
Party	Candidate	Votes	%
Republican	Aura K. Dunn (incumbent)	26,717	26.4
Republican	Christian E. Barranco (incumbent)	25,988	25.7
Democratic	Jonathan Torres	24,420	24.1
Democratic	Diane Salvatore	24,055	23.8
Total votes		101,180	100.0
Republican hold			
Republican hold			

== District 26 ==
The incumbents were Republicans Christian E. Barranco, who was elected with 29.32% of the vote in 2021, and Jay Webber, who was re-elected with 29.98% of the vote in 2021. Donald Trump won this district by 50.02% in 2020.

=== Republican primary ===
==== Nominees ====
- Brian Bergen, incumbent Assemblymember from the 25th district
- Jay Webber, incumbent Assemblymember

==== Eliminated in primary ====
- BettyLou DeCroce, former New Jersey General Assemblymember from the New Jersey's 24th legislative district (2012–2022)
- Robert Peluso, former Parsippany Councilmember

==== Convention results ====
Morris County Republican convention
Party	Candidate	Votes	%
Republican	Brian Bergen (incumbent)	200	48.7%
Republican	Jay Webber (incumbent)	165	40.1%
Republican	BettyLou DeCroce	46	11.2%
Total votes		411	100.0%

==== Primary results ====
Republican primary
Party	Candidate	Votes	%
Republican	Jay Webber (incumbent)	10,117	34.3%
Republican	Brian Bergen (incumbent)	9,162	31.0%
Republican	BettyLou DeCroce	5,131	17.4%
Republican	Robert Peluso	5,105	17.3%
Total votes		29,515	100.0%

=== Democratic primary ===
==== Nominees ====
- Walter Mielarczyk, engineer
- John Van Achen, former chair of the Parsippany Planning Board

==== Results ====
Democratic primary
Party	Candidate	Votes	%
Democratic	John Van Achen	6,727	50.4%
Democratic	Walter Mielarczyk	6,609	49.6%
Total votes		13,336	100.0%

=== General election ===
==== Predictions ====
Source	Seat	Ranking	As of
Elections Daily	Seat 1	Safe R	October 22, 2023
Elections Daily	Seat 2	Safe R	October 22, 2023
New Jersey Globe	Seat 1	Solid R	November 2, 2023
New Jersey Globe	Seat 2	Solid R	November 2, 2023

==== Results ====
26th Legislative District general election, 2023
Party	Candidate	Votes	%
Republican	Jay Webber (incumbent)	28,146	28.7
Republican	Brian Bergen (incumbent)	27,831	28.3
Democratic	John Van Achen	21,263	21.7
Democratic	Walter Mielarczyk	20,962	21.4
Total votes		98,202	100.0
Republican hold			
Republican hold			

== District 27 ==
The incumbents were Democrats Mila Jasey, who was re-elected with 30.95% of the vote in 2021, and John F. McKeon, who was re-elected with 31.62% of the vote in 2021. Joe Biden won this district by 70.61% in 2020.

=== Democratic primary ===
==== Nominees ====
- Rosaura Bagolie, Livingston Councilmember
- Alixon Collazos-Gill, former aide to Steve Rothman and wife of Brendan Gill

==== Eliminated in primary ====
- Eve Robinson, former Montclair Board of Education member
- Craig A. Stanley, former New Jersey General Assemblymember from the New Jersey's 28th legislative district (1996–2008) (also ran in special convention)

==== Withdrawn ====
- Thomas P. Giblin, incumbent Assemblymember from the 34th district
- Brendan Gill, Essex County Commissioner and husband of Alixon Collazos-Gill
- Frank Kasper, teacher
- John F. McKeon, incumbent Assemblymember (running for State Senate)

==== Declined ====
- Al Anthony, former mayor of Livingston
- Jackie Benjamin Lieberberg, former Millburn Committeemember
- Shawn Klein, Livingston Councilmember
- Maggee Miggins, Mayor of Millburn
- Carrie Parikh, CPO of Horizon Blue Cross Blue Shield of New Jersey
- Annette Romano, Millburn Democratic Municipal Chair
- Pat Sebold, Essex County Commissioner
- Sean Spiller, Mayor of Montclair (2020–present)

==== Endorsements ====
Alixon Collazos-Gill

Labor unions

- New Jersey AFL–CIO (co-endorsement with McKeon)
- New Jersey Education Association (co-endorsement with McKeon)

Organizations

- New Jersey League of Conservation Voters (co-endorsement with McKeon)
- Working Families Party (co-endorsement with McKeon)
John F. McKeon (withdrawn)

Labor unions

- New Jersey AFL–CIO (co-endorsement with Collazos-Gill)
- New Jersey Education Association (co-endorsement with Collazos-Gill)

Organizations

- New Jersey League of Conservation Voters (co-endorsement with Collazos-Gill)
- Working Families Party (co-endorsement with Collazos-Gill)

==== Primary results ====
Democratic primary
Party	Candidate	Votes	%
Democratic	John F. McKeon (incumbent)	10,264	39.1%
Democratic	Alixon Collazos-Gill	9,624	36.6%
Democratic	Eve Robinson	4,801	18.3%
Democratic	Craig A. Stanley	1,595	6.1%
Total votes		26,284	100.0%

==== Special convention results ====
Essex County Democratic special convention
Party	Candidate	Votes	%
Democratic	Rosaura Bagolie	107	64.5%
Democratic	Craig A. Stanley	59	35.5%
Total votes		166	100.0%

=== Republican primary ===
==== Nominees ====
- Irene DeVita, nominee for the 34th district in 2018
- Michael Mecca Jr., former Passaic County Commissioner

==== Withdrawn ====
- Malvin Frias, veteran
- Jonathan Sym

==== Results ====
Republican primary
Party	Candidate	Votes	%
Republican	Jonathan Sym (write-in)	212	49.2%
Republican	Irene DeVita (write-in)	184	42.7%
Republican	Other write-ins	35	8.1%
Total votes		431	100.0%

=== General election ===
==== Predictions ====
Source	Seat	Ranking	As of
Elections Daily	Seat 1	Safe D	October 22, 2023
Elections Daily	Seat 2	Safe D	October 22, 2023
New Jersey Globe	Seat 1	Solid D	November 2, 2023
New Jersey Globe	Seat 2	Solid D	November 2, 2023

==== Results ====
27th Legislative District general election, 2023
Party	Candidate	Votes	%
Democratic	Rosaura Bagolie	27,303	34.9
Democratic	Alixon Collazos-Gill	27,245	34.8
Republican	Irene DeVita	11,916	15.2
Republican	Michael Mecca Jr.	11,732	15.0
Total votes		78,196	100.0
Democratic hold			
Democratic hold			

== District 28 ==
The incumbents were Democrats Jackie Yustein, who was chosen to fill the seat after Ralph R. Caputo resigned, and Cleopatra G. Tucker, who was re-elected with 39.15% of the vote in 2021. Joe Biden won this district by 92.07% in 2020.

=== Democratic primary ===
==== Nominees ====
- Garnet Hall, Deputy Essex County Clerk
- Cleopatra G. Tucker, incumbent Assemblymember

==== Eliminated in primary ====
- Frank McGehee, former mayor of Maplewood

==== Withdrawn ====
- Mila Jasey, incumbent Assemblymember from the 27th district

==== Declined ====
- Bobby Brown, South Orange Trustee and former NFL player
- Jamaine Cripe, Maplewood Committeemember
- Summer Jones, South Orange Trustee
- India Larrier, former Maplewood Committeemember

==== Endorsements ====
Garnet Hall

Labor unions

- New Jersey AFL–CIO (co-endorsement with Tucker)
- New Jersey Education Association (co-endorsement with Tucker)

Organizations

- New Jersey League of Conservation Voters
Cleopatra G. Tucker (incumbent)

Labor unions

- New Jersey AFL–CIO (co-endorsement with Hall)
- New Jersey Education Association (co-endorsement with Hall)

==== Results ====
Democratic primary
Party	Candidate	Votes	%
Democratic	Garnet Hall	8,520	41.0%
Democratic	Cleopatra G. Tucker (incumbent)	8,237	39.6%
Democratic	Frank McGehee	4,025	19.4%
Total votes		20,782	100.0%

=== Republican primary ===
==== Nominees ====
- Joy Freeman, candidate for New Jersey's 28th senate district in 2022
- Willie S. Jetti

==== Results ====
Republican primary
Party	Candidate	Votes	%
Republican	Joy Freeman	274	53.0%
Republican	Willie S. Jetti	243	47.0%
Total votes		517	100.0%

=== General election ===
==== Predictions ====
Source	Seat	Ranking	As of
Elections Daily	Seat 1	Safe D	October 22, 2023
Elections Daily	Seat 2	Safe D	October 22, 2023
New Jersey Globe	Seat 1	Solid D	November 2, 2023
New Jersey Globe	Seat 2	Solid D	November 2, 2023

==== Results ====
28th Legislative District general election, 2023
Party	Candidate	Votes	%
Democratic	Cleopatra G. Tucker (incumbent)	19,094	46.3
Democratic	Garnet Hall	18,637	45.2
Republican	Joy Freeman	1,902	4.6
Republican	Willie S. Jetti	1,600	3.9
Total votes		41,233	100.0
Democratic hold			
Democratic hold			

== District 29 ==
The incumbents were Democrats Eliana Pintor Marin, who was re-elected with 49.14% of the vote in 2021, and Shanique Speight, who was re-elected with 48.30% of the vote in 2021. Joe Biden won this district by 80.82% in 2020.

=== Democratic primary ===
==== Nominees ====
- Eliana Pintor Marin, incumbent Assemblymember
- Shanique Speight, incumbent Assemblymember

==== Endorsements ====
Eliana Pintor Marin (incumbent)

Labor unions

- New Jersey AFL–CIO (co-endorsement with Speight)
Shanique Speight (incumbent)

Labor unions

- New Jersey AFL–CIO (co-endorsement with Pintor Marin)

==== Results ====
Democratic primary
Party	Candidate	Votes	%
Democratic	Shanique Speight (incumbent)	3,792	50.3%
Democratic	Eliana Pintor Marin (incumbent)	3,749	49.7%
Total votes		7,541	

=== Republican primary ===
==== Nominees ====
- Orlando Mendez
- Noble Milton

==== Results ====
Republican primary
Party	Candidate	Votes	%
Republican	Orlando Mendez	233	52.1%
Republican	Noble Milton	214	47.9%
Total votes		447	100.0

=== General election ===
==== Predictions ====
Source	Seat	Ranking	As of
Elections Daily	Seat 1	Safe D	October 22, 2023
Elections Daily	Seat 2	Safe D	October 22, 2023
New Jersey Globe	Seat 1	Solid D	November 2, 2023
New Jersey Globe	Seat 2	Solid D	November 2, 2023

==== Results ====
29th Legislative District general election, 2023
Party	Candidate	Votes	%
Democratic	Eliana Pintor Marin (incumbent)	7,488	42.5
Democratic	Shanique Speight (incumbent)	7,409	42.0
Republican	Orlando Mendez	1,419	8.1
Republican	Noble Milton	1,308	7.4
Total votes		17,624	100.0
Democratic hold			
Democratic hold			

== District 30 ==
The incumbents were Republicans Sean T. Kean who was re-elected with 36.76% of the vote in 2021, and Edward H. Thomson who was re-elected with 35.50% of the vote in 2021. Donald Trump won this district by 67.27% in 2020. In a major upset, Democratic Orthodox Jewish Rabbi Avi Schnall defeated Thomson for the second Assembly seat. Schnall was backed by the Jewish community in Lakewood Township, winning 86% of the Townships vote over Thomson when counted as a two-way race, allowing him to overcome the rest of the district's Republican lean.

=== Republican primary ===
==== Nominees ====
- Sean T. Kean, incumbent Assemblymember
- Edward H. Thomson, incumbent Assemblymember

==== Endorsements ====
Sean T. Kean (incumbent)

Labor unions

- New Jersey AFL–CIO (co-endorsement with Thomson)
Edward H. Thomson (incumbent)

Labor unions

- New Jersey AFL–CIO (co-endorsement with Kean)

==== Results ====
Republican primary
Party	Candidate	Votes	%
Republican	Sean T. Kean (incumbent)	3,920	50.7%
Republican	Edward H. Thomson (incumbent)	3,814	49.3%
Total votes		7,734	100.0%

=== Democratic primary ===
==== Nominees ====
- Salvatore Frascino, police detective
- Avi Schnall, director of New Jersey Agudath Israel of America

==== Withdrawn ====
- Marta Harrison, former mayor of Lakewood Township

==== Endorsements ====
Avi Schnall

Organizations

- Lakewood Vaad

==== Results ====
Democratic primary
Party	Candidate	Votes	%
Democratic	Marta Harrison	2,553	50.5%
Democratic	Salvatore Frascino	2,507	49.5%
Total votes		5,060	100.0%

=== General election ===
==== Predictions ====
Source	Seat	Ranking	As of
Elections Daily	Seat 1	Safe R	October 22, 2023
Elections Daily	Seat 2	Likely R	October 22, 2023
New Jersey Globe	Seat 1	Solid R	November 2, 2023
New Jersey Globe	Seat 2	Tossup	November 2, 2023

==== Results ====
30th Legislative District general election, 2023
Party	Candidate	Votes	%
Republican	Sean T. Kean (incumbent)	37,450	39.9
Democratic	Avi Schnall	29,482	31.4
Republican	Edward H. Thomson (incumbent)	18,076	19.3
Democratic	Salvatore Frascino	8,868	9.4
Total votes		93,876	100.0
Republican hold			
Democratic gain from Republican			

== District 31 ==
The incumbents were Democrats Angela V. McKnight, who was re-elected with 38.30% of the vote in 2021, and William Sampson, who was elected with 36.28% of the vote in 2021. Joe Biden won this district by 72.12% in 2020.

=== Democratic primary ===
==== Nominees ====
- William Sampson, incumbent Assemblymember
- Barbara McCann Stamato, Jersey City Democratic Municipal Chair and sister of Gerald McCann

==== Eliminated in primary ====
- Shanelle L. Smith

==== Endorsements ====
William Sampson (incumbent)

Labor unions

- New Jersey AFL–CIO (co-endorsement with McCann Stamato)
- New Jersey Education Association (co-endorsement with McCann Stamato)
Barbara McCann Stamato

Labor unions

- New Jersey AFL–CIO (co-endorsement with Sampson)
- New Jersey Education Association (co-endorsement with Sampson)

==== Results ====
Democratic primary
Party	Candidate	Votes	%
Democratic	William Sampson (incumbent)	8,090	42.6%
Democratic	Barbara McCann Stamato	7,713	40.7%
Democratic	Shanelle L. Smith	3,166	16.7%
Total votes		18,969	100.0%

=== Republican primary ===
==== Nominees ====
- Angelique M. Diaz
- Sydney J. Ferreira

==== Results ====
Republican primary
Party	Candidate	Votes	%
Republican	Sydney J. Ferreira	1,009	50.1%
Republican	Angelique M. Diaz	1,005	49.9%
Total votes		2,014	100.0%

=== General election ===
==== Predictions ====
Source	Seat	Ranking	As of
Elections Daily	Seat 1	Safe D	October 22, 2023
Elections Daily	Seat 2	Safe D	October 22, 2023
New Jersey Globe	Seat 1	Solid D	November 2, 2023
New Jersey Globe	Seat 2	Solid D	November 2, 2023

==== Results ====
31st Legislative District general election, 2023
Party	Candidate	Votes	%
Democratic	Barbara McCann Stamato	13,003	34.7
Democratic	William Sampson (incumbent)	12,883	34.4
Republican	Sydney J. Ferreira	4,237	11.3
Republican	Angelique M. Diaz	4,153	11.1
Leadership Experience Values	Mary Jane Desmond	1,724	4.6
Leadership Experience Values	Noemi Velazquez	1,443	3.9
Total votes		37,443	100.0
Democratic hold			
Democratic hold			

== District 32 ==
The incumbents were Democrats Angelica M. Jimenez, who was re-elected with 35.49% of the vote in 2021, and Pedro Mejia, who was re-elected with 34.67% of the vote in 2021. Joe Biden won this district by 77.86% in 2020.

=== Democratic primary ===
==== Nominees ====
- John Allen, lawyer and former Chief of Staff to Ravinder Bhalla
- Jessica Ramirez, lawyer

==== Declined ====
- Annette Chaparro, incumbent Assemblymember from the 33rd district
- Raj Mukherji, incumbent Assemblymember from the 33rd district (running for State Senate)

==== Endorsements ====
John Allen

Labor unions

- New Jersey AFL–CIO (co-endorsement with Ramirez)
- New Jersey Education Association (co-endorsement with Ramirez)

Organizations

- New Jersey League of Conservation Voters (co-endorsement with Ramirez)
Jessica Ramirez

Labor unions

- New Jersey AFL–CIO (co-endorsement with Allen)
- New Jersey Education Association (co-endorsement with Allen)

Organizations

- New Jersey League of Conservation Voters (co-endorsement with Allen)

==== Results ====
Democratic primary
Party	Candidate	Votes	%
Democratic	Jessica Ramirez	8,672	51.0%
Democratic	John Allen	8,339	49.0%
Total votes		17,011	100.0%

=== Republican primary ===
==== Nominee ====
- Robert Ramos

==== Withdrawn ====
- Alex Garcia

==== Results ====
Republican primary
Party	Candidate	Votes	%
Republican	Robert Ramos	740	50.2%
Republican	Alex Garcia	734	49.8%
Total votes		1,474	100.0%

=== General election ===
==== Predictions ====
Source	Seat	Ranking	As of
Elections Daily	Seat 1	Safe D	October 22, 2023
Elections Daily	Seat 2	Safe D	October 22, 2023
New Jersey Globe	Seat 1	Solid D	November 2, 2023
New Jersey Globe	Seat 2	Solid D	November 2, 2023

==== Results ====
32nd Legislative District general election, 2023
Party	Candidate	Votes	%
Democratic	Jessica Ramirez	15,197	45.7
Democratic	John Allen	14,391	43.3
Republican	Robert Ramos	3,665	11.0
Total votes		33,253	100.0
Democratic hold			
Democratic hold			

== District 33 ==
The incumbents were Democrats Annette Chaparro, who was re-elected with 40.86% of the vote in 2021, and Raj Mukherji, who was re-elected with 40.53% of the vote in 2021. Joe Biden won this district by 68.10% in 2020.

=== Democratic primary ===
==== Nominees ====
- Julio Marenco, North Bergen Commissioner
- Gabe Rodriguez, former mayor of West New York (2019–2023)

==== Declined ====
- Angelica M. Jimenez, incumbent Assemblymember from the 32nd district (ran for West New York Board of Commissioners)
- Pedro Mejia, incumbent Assemblymember from the 32nd district

==== Endorsements ====
Julio Marenco

Labor unions

- New Jersey AFL–CIO (co-endorsement with Rodriguez)
- New Jersey Education Association (co-endorsement with Rodriguez)
Gabe Rodriguez

Labor unions

- New Jersey AFL–CIO (co-endorsement with Marenco)
- New Jersey Education Association (co-endorsement with Marenco)

==== Results ====
Democratic primary
Party	Candidate	Votes	%
Democratic	Gabe Rodriguez	18,928	50.1%
Democratic	Julio Marenco	18,873	49.9%
Total votes		37,801	100.0%

=== Republican primary ===
No Republicans filed.

Republican primary
Party	Candidate	Votes	%
Republican	Write-in	227	100.0%
Total votes		227	100.0%

=== General election ===
==== Predictions ====
Source	Seat	Ranking	As of
Elections Daily	Seat 1	Safe D	October 22, 2023
Elections Daily	Seat 2	Safe D	October 22, 2023
New Jersey Globe	Seat 1	Solid D	November 2, 2023
New Jersey Globe	Seat 2	Solid D	November 2, 2023

==== Results ====
33rd Legislative District general election, 2023
Party	Candidate	Votes	%
Democratic	Gabe Rodriguez	25,384	49.3
Democratic	Julio Marenco	24,956	48.5
Socialist Workers	Lea Sherman	1,121	2.2
Total votes		51,461	100.0
Democratic hold			
Democratic hold			

== District 34 ==
The incumbents were Democrats Britnee Timberlake, who was re-elected with 38.94% of the vote in 2021, and Thomas P. Giblin, who was re-elected with 39.29% of the vote in 2021. Joe Biden won this district by 75.38% in 2020.

=== Democratic primary ===
==== Nominees ====
- Carmen Morales, principal
- Michael Venezia, Mayor of Bloomfield

==== Declined ====
- Sarah Cruz, Bloomfield Councilmember
- Wartyna Davis, Bloomfield Councilmember
- Britnee Timberlake, incumbent Assemblymember (running for State Senate)
- Jackie Yustein, incumbent Assemblymember from the 28th district

==== Endorsements ====
Carmen Morales

Labor unions

- New Jersey AFL–CIO (co-endorsement with Venezia)
- New Jersey Education Association (co-endorsement with Venezia)
Michael Venezia

Labor unions

- New Jersey AFL–CIO (co-endorsement with Morales)
- New Jersey Education Association (co-endorsement with Morales)

==== Results ====
Democratic primary
Party	Candidate	Votes	%
Democratic	Carmen Morales	8,332	50.3%
Democratic	Michael Venezia	8,238	49.7%
Total votes		16,570	100.0%

=== Republican primary ===
==== Nominees ====
- Clenard H. Childress Jr., Independent candidate for this seat in 2018
- James McGuire

==== Results ====
Republican primary
Party	Candidate	Votes	%
Republican	James McGuire	791	66.7%
Republican	Clenard H. Childress Jr.	395	33.3%
Total votes		1,186	

=== General election ===
==== Predictions ====
Source	Seat	Ranking	As of
Elections Daily	Seat 1	Safe D	October 22, 2023
Elections Daily	Seat 2	Safe D	October 22, 2023
New Jersey Globe	Seat 1	Solid D	November 2, 2023
New Jersey Globe	Seat 2	Solid D	November 2, 2023

==== Results ====
34th Legislative District general election, 2023
Party	Candidate	Votes	%
Democratic	Michael Venezia	18,400	38.8
Democratic	Carmen Morales	18,173	38.3
Republican	James McGuire	5,597	11.8
Republican	Clenard H. Childress Jr.	5,241	11.1
Total votes		47,411	100.0
Democratic hold			
Democratic hold			

== District 35 ==
The incumbents were Democrats Shavonda Sumter, who was re-elected with 34.49% of the vote in 2021, and Benjie E. Wimberly, who was re-elected with 34.56% of the vote in 2021. Joe Biden won this district by 70.22% in 2020.

=== Democratic primary ===
==== Nominees ====
- Shavonda Sumter, incumbent Assemblymember
- Benjie E. Wimberly, incumbent Assemblymember

==== Endorsements ====
Shavonda Sumter (incumbent)

Labor unions

- New Jersey AFL–CIO (co-endorsement with Wimberly)
- New Jersey Education Association (co-endorsement with Wimberly)
Benjie E. Wimberly (incumbent)

Labor unions

- New Jersey AFL–CIO (co-endorsement with Sumter)
- New Jersey Education Association (co-endorsement with Sumter)

==== Results ====
Democratic primary
Party	Candidate	Votes	%
Democratic	Shavonda Sumter (incumbent)	3,632	50.0%
Democratic	Benjie E. Wimberly (incumbent)	3,632	50.0%
Total votes		7,264	100.0%

=== Republican primary ===
No Republicans filed.

Republican primary
Party	Candidate	Votes	%
Republican	Write-in	125	100.0%
Total votes		125	100.0%

=== General election ===
==== Predictions ====
Source	Seat	Ranking	As of
Elections Daily	Seat 1	Safe D	October 22, 2023
Elections Daily	Seat 2	Safe D	October 22, 2023
New Jersey Globe	Seat 1	Solid D	November 2, 2023
New Jersey Globe	Seat 2	Solid D	November 2, 2023

==== Results ====
35th Legislative District general election, 2023
Party	Candidate	Votes	%
Democratic	Benjie E. Wimberly (incumbent)	12,320	50.2
Democratic	Shavonda Sumter (incumbent)	12,214	49.8
Total votes		24,534	100.0
Democratic hold			
Democratic hold			

== District 36 ==
The incumbents were Democrats Clinton Calabrese, who was re-elected with 27.80% of the vote in 2021, and Gary S. Schaer, who was re-elected with 28.40% of the vote in 2021. Joe Biden won this district by 56.39% in 2020.

=== Democratic primary ===
==== Nominees ====
- Clinton Calabrese, incumbent Assemblymember
- Gary S. Schaer, incumbent Assemblymember

==== Endorsements ====
Clinton Calabrese (incumbent)

Labor unions

- New Jersey AFL–CIO (co-endorsement with Schaer)
- New Jersey Education Association (co-endorsement with Schaer)

Organizations

- New Jersey League of Conservation Voters (co-endorsement with Schaer)
Gary S. Schaer (incumbent)

Labor unions

- New Jersey AFL–CIO (co-endorsement with Calabrese)
- New Jersey Education Association (co-endorsement with Calabrese)

Organizations

- New Jersey League of Conservation Voters (co-endorsement with Calabrese)

==== Results ====
Democratic primary
Party	Candidate	Votes	%
Democratic	Clinton Calabrese (incumbent)	4,328	50.3%
Democratic	Gary S. Schaer (incumbent)	4,272	49.7%
Total votes		8,600	100.0%

=== Republican primary ===
==== Nominees ====
- Craig Auriemma, nominee for this seat in 2021
- Joseph Viso Jr., nominee for this seat in 2021

==== Results ====
Republican primary
Party	Candidate	Votes	%
Republican	Craig Auriemma	2,234	50.3%
Republican	Joseph Viso Jr.	2,209	49.7%
Total votes		4,443	100.0%

=== General election ===
==== Predictions ====
Source	Seat	Ranking	As of
Elections Daily	Seat 1	Safe D	October 22, 2023
Elections Daily	Seat 2	Safe D	October 22, 2023
New Jersey Globe	Seat 1	Solid D	November 2, 2023
New Jersey Globe	Seat 2	Solid D	November 2, 2023

==== Results ====
36th Legislative District general election, 2023
Party	Candidate	Votes	%
Democratic	Clinton Calabrese (incumbent)	18,228	30.6
Democratic	Gary S. Schaer (incumbent)	18,072	30.3
Republican	Craig Auriemma	11,761	19.7
Republican	Joseph Viso Jr.	11,546	19.4
Total votes		59,607	100.0
Democratic hold			
Democratic hold			

== District 37 ==
The incumbents were Democrats Shama A. Haider, who was elected with 33.03% of the vote in 2021, and Ellen J. Park, who was elected with 33.77% of the vote in 2021. Joe Biden won this district by 69.84% in 2020.

=== Democratic primary ===
==== Nominees ====
- Shama A. Haider, incumbent Assemblymember
- Ellen J. Park, incumbent Assemblymember

==== Endorsements ====
Shama A. Haider (incumbent)

Labor unions

- New Jersey AFL–CIO (co-endorsement with Park)
- New Jersey Education Association (co-endorsement with Park)

Organizations

- New Jersey League of Conservation Voters (co-endorsement with Park)
Ellen J. Park (incumbent)

Labor unions

- New Jersey AFL–CIO (co-endorsement with Haider)
- New Jersey Education Association (co-endorsement with Haider)

Organizations

- New Jersey League of Conservation Voters (co-endorsement with Haider)

==== Results ====
Democratic primary
Party	Candidate	Votes	%
Democratic	Ellen J. Park (incumbent)	8,493	50.9%
Democratic	Shama A. Haider (incumbent)	8,178	49.1%
Total votes		16,671	100.0%

=== Republican primary ===
==== Nominees ====
- Robert Bedoya
- Katherine Lebovics

==== Results ====
Republican primary
Party	Candidate	Votes	%
Republican	Katherine Lebovics	1,810	51.2%
Republican	Robert Bedoya	1,727	48.9%
Total votes		3,537	100.0%

=== General election ===
==== Predictions ====
Source	Seat	Ranking	As of
Elections Daily	Seat 1	Safe D	October 22, 2023
Elections Daily	Seat 2	Safe D	October 22, 2023
New Jersey Globe	Seat 1	Solid D	November 2, 2023
New Jersey Globe	Seat 2	Solid D	November 2, 2023

==== Results ====
37th Legislative District general election, 2023
Party	Candidate	Votes	%
Democratic	Ellen J. Park (incumbent)	26,942	36.4
Democratic	Shama A. Haider (incumbent)	25,943	35.0
Republican	Robert Bedoya	10,673	14.4
Republican	Katherine Lebovics	10,526	14.2
Total votes		74,084	100.0
Democratic hold			
Democratic hold			

== District 38 ==
The incumbents were Democrats Lisa Swain, who was re-elected with 26.52% of the vote in 2021, and Chris Tully, who was re-elected with 25.92% of the vote. Joe Biden won this district by 56.63% in 2020.

=== Democratic primary ===
==== Nominees ====
- Lisa Swain, incumbent Assemblymember
- Chris Tully, incumbent Assemblymember

==== Endorsements ====
Lisa Swain (incumbent)

Labor unions

- New Jersey AFL–CIO (co-endorsement with Tully)
- New Jersey Education Association (co-endorsement with Tully)

Organizations

- New Jersey League of Conservation Voters (co-endorsement with Tully)
Chris Tully (incumbent)

Labor unions

- New Jersey AFL–CIO (co-endorsement with Swain)
- New Jersey Education Association (co-endorsement with Swain)

Organizations

- New Jersey League of Conservation Voters (co-endorsement with Swain)

==== Results ====
Democratic primary
Party	Candidate	Votes	%
Democratic	Lisa Swain (incumbent)	6,246	50.8%
Democratic	Chris Tully (incumbent)	6,055	49.2%
Total votes		12,301	100.0%

=== Republican primary ===
==== Nominees ====
- Gail Horton, nominee for this seat in 2018
- Barry Wilkes, businessman

==== Results ====
Republican primary
Party	Candidate	Votes	%
Republican	Barry Wilkes	3,296	50.1%
Republican	Gail Horton	3,286	49.9%
Total votes		6,582	100.0%

=== General election ===
==== Predictions ====
Source	Seat	Ranking	As of
Elections Daily	Seat 1	Likely D	October 22, 2023
Elections Daily	Seat 2	Lean D	October 22, 2023
New Jersey Globe	Seat 1	Lean D	November 2, 2023
New Jersey Globe	Seat 2	Lean D	November 2, 2023

==== Results ====
38th Legislative District general election, 2023
Party	Candidate	Votes	%
Democratic	Lisa Swain (incumbent)	27,717	28.3
Democratic	Chris Tully (incumbent)	27,304	27.9
Republican	Gail Horton	21,517	22.0
Republican	Barry Wilkes	21,490	21.9
Total votes		98,028	100.0
Democratic hold			
Democratic hold			

== District 39 ==
The incumbents were Republicans Robert Auth, who was re-elected with 28.29% of the vote in 2021, and DeAnne DeFuccio, who was re-elected with 27.94% of the vote in 2021. Joe Biden won this district by 52.72% in 2020.

=== Republican primary ===
==== Nominees ====
- Robert Auth, incumbent Assemblymember
- John Azzariti, Saddle River Councilman and candidate for this seat in 2021

==== Withdrawn ====
- DeAnne DeFuccio, incumbent Assemblymember
- Todd Caliguire, former Bergen County Freeholder
- Jon Kurpis, Saddle River Republican Chair and candidate for this seat in 2021
- Ken Tyburczy, Ramsey Republican Chair and former Ramsey Councilman

==== Convention results ====
Bergen County Republican convention
Party	Candidate	Votes	%
Republican	Robert Auth (incumbent)	216	44.6%
Republican	John V. Azzariti	159	32.9%
Republican	Todd Caliguire	109	22.5%
Total votes		484	100.0%

==== Primary results ====
Republican primary
Party	Candidate	Votes	%
Republican	Robert Auth (incumbent)	5,642	50.4%
Republican	John V. Azzariti	5,551	49.6%
Total votes		11,193	100.0%

=== Democratic primary ===
==== Nominees ====
- Damon Englese, principal
- John Vitale, restaurant owner

==== Endorsements ====
Damon Englese

Labor unions

- New Jersey Education Association (co-endorsement with Vitale)
John Vitale

Labor unions

- New Jersey Education Association (co-endorsement with Englese)

==== Results ====
Democratic primary
Party	Candidate	Votes	%
Democratic	John Vitale	6,439	50.4%
Democratic	Damon Englese	6,331	49.6%
Total votes		12,770	100.0%

=== General election ===
==== Predictions ====
Source	Seat	Ranking	As of
Elections Daily	Seat 1	Likely R	October 22, 2023
Elections Daily	Seat 2	Lean R	October 22, 2023
New Jersey Globe	Seat 1	Likely R	November 2, 2023
New Jersey Globe	Seat 2	Likely R	November 2, 2023

==== Results ====
39th Legislative District general election, 2023
Party	Candidate	Votes	%
Republican	Robert Auth (incumbent)	33,061	27.0
Republican	John V. Azzariti	32,340	26.4
Democratic	John Vitale	29,046	23.7
Democratic	Damon Englese	28,183	23.0
Total votes		122,630	100.0
Republican hold			
Republican hold			

== District 40 ==
The incumbents were Republicans Christopher P. DePhillips, who was re-elected with 29.59% of the vote in 2021, and Kevin J. Rooney, who was re-elected with 30.08% of the vote in 2021. Joe Biden won this district by 50.24% in 2020

=== Republican primary ===
==== Nominees ====
- Al Barlas, Essex County Republican Chair
- Christopher P. DePhillips, incumbent Assemblymember

==== Declined ====
- Kevin J. Rooney, incumbent Assemblymember

==== Endorsements ====
Al Barlas

Labor unions

- New Jersey Education Association (co-endorsement with DePhillips)
Christopher P. DePhillips (incumbent)

Labor unions

- New Jersey Education Association (co-endorsement with Barlas)

==== Results ====
Republican primary
Party	Candidate	Votes	%
Republican	Christopher P. DePhillips (incumbent)	6,137	50.8%
Republican	Al Barlas	5,953	49.2%
Total votes		12,090	100.0%

=== Democratic primary ===
==== Nominees ====
- Giovanna Irizarry, educator
- Jennifer Marrinan, businesswoman

==== Endorsements ====
Giovanna Irizarry

Labor unions

- New Jersey AFL–CIO (co-endorsement with Marrinan)
Jennifer Marrinan

Labor unions

- New Jersey AFL–CIO (co-endorsement with Irizarry)

==== Results ====
Democratic primary
Party	Candidate	Votes	%
Democratic	Jennifer Marrinan	6,009	50.1%
Democratic	Giovanna Irizarry	5,990	49.9%
Total votes		11,999	100.0%

=== General election ===
==== Predictions ====
Source	Seat	Ranking	As of
Elections Daily	Seat 1	Safe R	October 22, 2023
Elections Daily	Seat 2	Safe R	October 22, 2023
New Jersey Globe	Seat 1	Solid R	November 2, 2023
New Jersey Globe	Seat 2	Solid R	November 2, 2023

==== Results ====
40th Legislative District general election, 2023
Party	Candidate	Votes	%
Republican	Christopher P. DePhillips (incumbent)	28,601	27.9
Republican	Al Barlas	27,638	27.0
Democratic	Jennifer Marrinan	23,202	22.7
Democratic	Giovanna Irizarry	22,952	22.4
Total votes		102,393	100.0
Republican hold			
Republican hold			

== See also ==
- 2023 New Jersey elections
- 2023 New Jersey Senate election
- List of New Jersey state legislatures
