= Carmen Morales (New Jersey politician) =

American politician from New Jersey

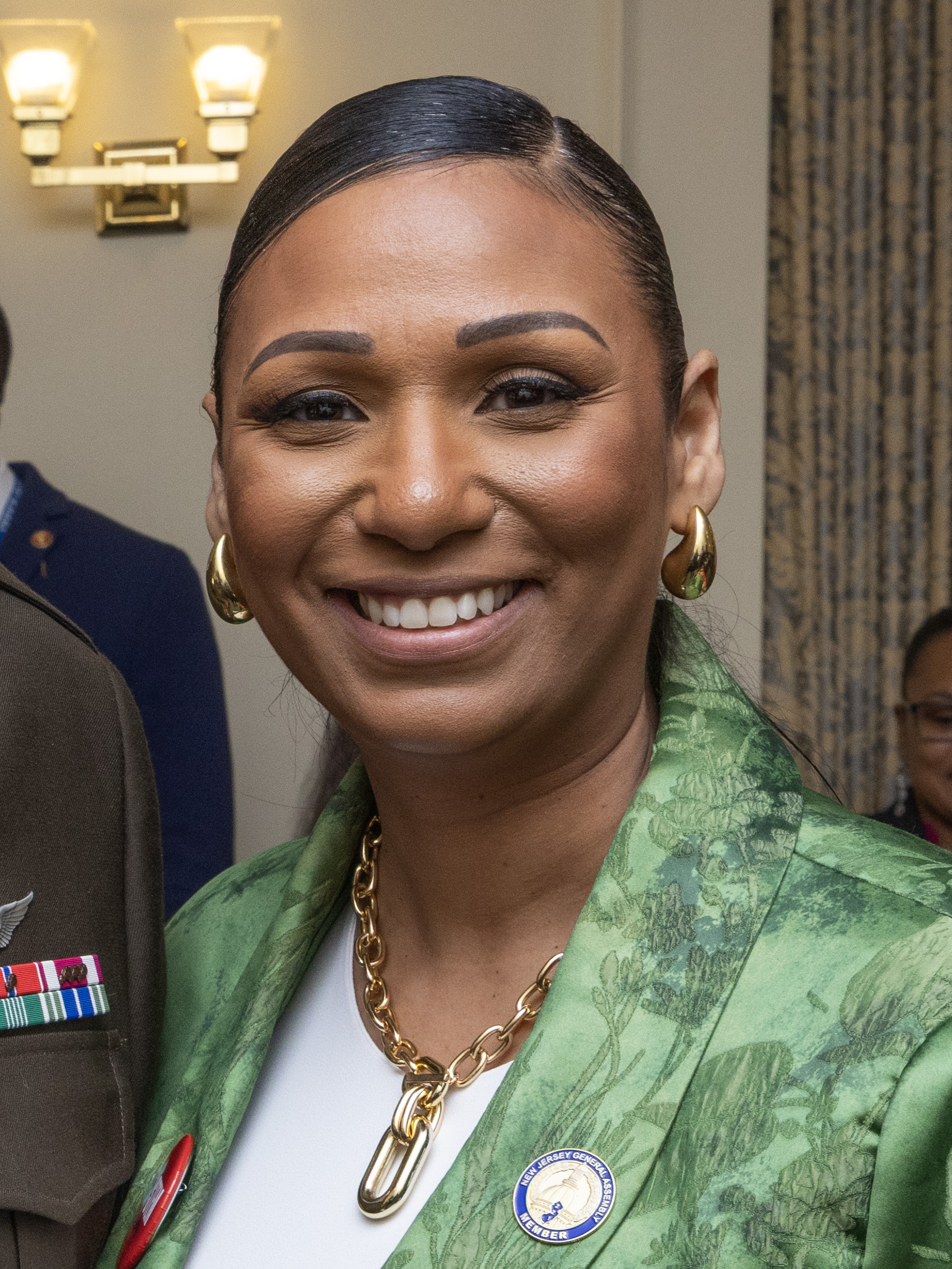
- Morales in 2025

Member of the New Jersey General Assembly from the 34th district
- Incumbent
- Assumed office January 9, 2024 Serving with Michael Venezia
- Preceded by: Thomas P. Giblin; Britnee Timberlake

Personal details
- Born: October 13, 1977 (age 48)
- Party: Democratic
- Education: Montclair State University; Fairleigh Dickinson University; Seton Hall University
- Website: Legislative webpage

Carmen Theresa Morales (born October 13, 1977) is an American Democratic Party politician serving as a member of the New Jersey General Assembly for the 34th legislative district, having taken office on January 9, 2024.

== Biography ==
A resident of Belleville, New Jersey, Morales earned her undergraduate degree at Montclair State University, a master's degree at Fairleigh Dickinson University and has completed all but her dissertation towards a doctorate at Seton Hall University. She is employed by the Essex County Schools of Technology as director of curriculum and instruction, Public or Party Service and has been a trustee of Essex County College from 2017 to 2023.

== Elective office ==
In the wake of the 2021 apportionment, the reconfiguration of municipalities in the district and the incumbent Assembly members in those districts choosing to retire or run for other elective office, the Essex County Democratic Organization chose newcomers Morales and Michael Venezia to run for the two Assembly seats. Morales and Venezia defeated Republicans Clenard H. Childress Jr. and James McGuire in the 2023 New Jersey General Assembly election. Marenco was one of 27 members elected for the first time in 2023 to serve in the General Assembly, more than one-third of the seats.

=== Committees ===
Committee assignments for the 2024—2025 Legislative Session are:

- Commerce, Economic Development and Agriculture
- Education

=== District 34 ===
Each of the 40 districts in the New Jersey Legislature has one representative in the New Jersey Senate and two members in the New Jersey General Assembly. The representatives from the 34th District for the 2024—2025 Legislative Session are:

- Senator Britnee Timberlake (D)
- Assemblyman Carmen Morales (D)
- Assemblyman Michael Venezia (D)

== Electoral history ==
34th Legislative District General Election, 2023
Party	Candidate	Votes	%
Democratic	Michael Venezia	18,400	38.8
Democratic	Carmen Morales	18,173	38.3
Republican	James McGuire	5,597	11.8
Republican	Clenard H. Childress Jr.	5,241	11.1
Total votes		47,411	100.0
Democratic hold			
Democratic hold			
