= Michael Venezia =

Michael Venezia may refer to:

- Mike Venezia, American horse racing jockey
- Michael Venezia (politician), member of the New Jersey General Assembly
