= Michael Venezia (politician) =

American politician from New Jersey

Member of the New Jersey General Assembly from the 34th district
- Incumbent
- Assumed office January 9, 2024 Serving with Carmen Morales
- Preceded by: Thomas P. Giblin; Britnee Timberlake

Personal details
- Party: Democratic
- Education: Monmouth University; Fairleigh Dickinson University
- Website: Legislative webpage

Michael Venezia is an American Democratic Party politician serving as a member of the New Jersey General Assembly for the 34th legislative district, having taken office on January 9, 2024.

== Biography ==
A resident of Bloomfield, New Jersey, Venezia earned his undergraduate degree at Monmouth University and a graduate degree at Fairleigh Dickinson University. He has been employed by the Essex County Schools of Technology as its director of Human Resources.

== Elected office ==
Venezia served on the Bloomfield council and has served as mayor of Bloomfield since 2014, when he was elected as the township's youngest mayor. He stepped down from office as mayor on January 8, 2024 and was replaced by interim mayor Ted Gamble, one of three candidates nominated by the Democratic municipal committee. Council members voted in Gamble over Councilwoman Jenny Mundell by a 4-2 vote; he will serve on an interim basis until the November 2024 general election, when a candidate will be chosen to serve the balance of Venezia's term of office.

In the wake of the 2021 apportionment, the reconfiguration of municipalities in the district and the incumbent Assembly members in those districts choosing to retire or run for other elective office, the Essex County Democratic Organization chose newcomers Carmen Morales and Venezia to run for the two Assembly seats. Morales and Venezia defeated Republicans Clenard H. Childress Jr. and James McGuire in the 2023 New Jersey General Assembly election. Venezia was one of 27 members elected for the first time in 2023 to serve in the General Assembly, more than one-third of the seats.

=== Committees ===
Committee assignments for the 2024—2025 Legislative Session are:

- Budget
- Judiciary

=== District 34 ===
Each of the 40 districts in the New Jersey Legislature has one representative in the New Jersey Senate and two members in the New Jersey General Assembly. The representatives from the 34th District for the 2024—2025 Legislative Session are:

- Senator Britnee Timberlake (D)
- Assemblyman Carmen Morales (D)
- Assemblyman Michael Venezia (D)

== Electoral history ==
34th Legislative District General Election, 2023
Party	Candidate	Votes	%
Democratic	Michael Venezia	18,400	38.8
Democratic	Carmen Morales	18,173	38.3
Republican	James McGuire	5,597	11.8
Republican	Clenard H. Childress Jr.	5,241	11.1
Total votes		47,411	100.0
Democratic hold			
Democratic hold			
