= List of charter schools in New Jersey =

The following is a list of charter schools in New Jersey (including networks of such schools) grouped by county.

== Atlantic County ==
- Atlantic Community Charter School
- Charter-Tech High School for the Performing Arts
- Principle Academy Charter School

== Bergen County ==
- Bergen Arts and Science Charter School
- Englewood on the Palisades Charter School
- Teaneck Community Charter School

== Burlington County ==
- Benjamin Banneker Preparatory Charter School
- Riverbank Charter School of Excellence

== Camden County ==
- Camden's Promise Charter Schools (4 schools)
- Environment Community Opportunity (ECO) Charter School
- Hope Community Charter School
- KIPP Camden (6 schools)
- LEAP Academy University Charter School
- Mastery Schools Camden (6 schools)
- UnCommon Schools Camden Prep (5 schools)

== Cumberland County ==
- Bridgeton Public Charter School
- Compass Academy Charter School
- Millville Public Charter School
- Vineland Public Charter School

== Essex County ==
- Achieve Community Charter School
- Burch Charter School of Excellence
- Discovery Charter School
- East Orange Community Charter School
- Gray Charter School
- Great Oaks Legacy Charter School
- KIPP Newark (14 schools)
- Link Community Charter School
- Maria L. Varisco-Rogers Charter School
- Marion P. Thomas Charter School
- New Horizons Community Charter School
- Newark Educators Community Charter School
- People's Prep Charter School
- Phillip's Academy Charter School Newark
- Pride Academy Charter School
- Robert Treat Academy Charter School
- Roseville Community Charter School
- UnCommon Schools North Star (14 schools)
- University Heights Charter School

== Hudson County ==
- BelovED Community Charter School
- Dr. Lena Edwards Academic Charter School
- Elysian Charter School
- Empowerment Academy Charter School
- Ethical Community Charter School
- Golden Door Charter School
- Hoboken Charter School
- iLearn Schools (Hudson Arts & Science)
- Jersey City Community Charter School
- Jersey City Global Charter School
- Learning Community Charter School
- Soaring Heights Charter School
- University Academy Charter High School

== Mercer County ==
- Achievers Early College Prep Public Charter School
- Foundation Academies (4 schools)
- International Charter School of Trenton
- Pace Charter School of Hamilton
- Paul Robeson Charter School
- Princeton Charter School
- STEMCivics
- Village Charter School

== Middlesex County ==
- Academy for Urban Leadership Charter High School
- Greater Brunswick Charter School
- Hatikvah International Academy Charter School
- Middlesex County STEM Charter School

== Monmouth County ==
- Academy Charter High School
- College Achieve Asbury
- Hope Academy Charter School
- Red Bank Charter School

== Morris County ==
- Unity Charter School

== Ocean County ==
- Ocean Academy Charter School

== Passaic County ==
- Classical Academy Charter School
- College Achieve Paterson
- Community Charter School of Paterson
- iLearn Charter Schools (Passaic Arts & Science, Paterson Arts & Science)
- John P. Holland Charter School
- Paterson Charter School for Science and Technology
- Philip's Academy Charter School of Paterson

== Salem County ==
- Creativity CoLaboratory Charter School

== Somerset County ==
- Central Jersey College Prep Charter School
- Thomas Edison Energysmart Charter School

== Sussex County ==
- Sussex County Charter School for Technology

== Union County ==
- Barack Obama Green Charter High School
- College Achieve Central Charter School
- Cresthaven Academy Charter School
- Queen City Academy Charter School
- Union County TEAMS Charter School

== Warren County ==
- Ridge and Valley Charter School
