= Barack Obama Green Charter High School =

Charter high school in Union County, New Jersey, US

Address
- 35 Watchung Avenue Plainfield, Union County, New Jersey, 07060; United States
- Coordinates: 40.620529°N 74.423280°W

District information
- Grades: 9-12"
- Superintendent: Erin Murphy-Richardson
- Business administrator: Joan Orimaco
- Schools: 1

Students and staff
- Enrollment: 358 (as of 2024–25)
- Faculty: 25.0 FTEs
- Student–teacher ratio: 14.3:1

Other information
- Website: hs.barackobamagreencharterschool.org
| Ind. | Per pupil | District spending | Rank (*) | Charter 9-12 average | %± vs. average |
|---|---|---|---|---|---|
| 1A | Total Spending | $15,625 | 34 | $18,047 | −13.4% |
| 1 | Budgetary Cost | 9,862 | 7 | 13,238 | −25.5% |
| 2 | Classroom Instruction | 5,753 | 13 | 7,328 | −21.5% |
| 6 | Support Services | 2,012 | 60 | 1,661 | 21.1% |
| 8 | Administrative Cost | 1,814 | 11 | 2,563 | −29.2% |
| 10 | Operations & Maintenance | 82 | 1 | 1,661 | −95.1% |
Data from NJDoE 2013 Taxpayers' Guide to Education Spending. *Of Charter 9-12 districts with any number of students. Lowest spending=1; Highest=77

Barack Obama Green Charter High School

Information
- Type: Charter public high school
- Established: September 2010
- NCES School ID: 340074003047
- Principal: Erin Murphy-Richardson
- Faculty: 25.0 FTEs
- Grades: 9–12
- Enrollment: 358 (as of 2024–25)
- Student to teacher ratio: 14.3:1
- Colors: Green and yellow
- Team name: Hornets

Barack Obama Green Charter High School is a charter high school that serves students in ninth through twelfth grades in Plainfield, in Union County, in the U.S. state of New Jersey, that focuses on education in the field of Sustainability and Leadership. The school operates on a charter granted by the New Jersey Department of Education. The charter for the school was approved in September 2009, as part of an announcement by Governor Jon Corzine of eight charter schools granted by the state in that cycle. After receiving approval from city's Board of Adjustment, the school opened in September 2010.

As of the 2024–25 school year, the school had an enrollment of 358 students and 25.0 classroom teachers (on an FTE basis), for a student–teacher ratio of 14.3:1. There were 251 students (70.1% of enrollment) eligible for free lunch and 29 (8.1% of students) eligible for reduced-cost lunch.

== Athletics ==
The Barack Obama Green Charter High School Hornets play independently of any conference in play under the auspices of the New Jersey State Interscholastic Athletic Association (NJSIAA). With 192 students in grades 10-12, the school was classified by the NJSIAA for the 2019–20 school year as Group I for most athletic competition purposes, which included schools with an enrollment of 75 to 476 students in that grade range.

== Administration ==
Core members of the school's administration are:

- Erin Murphy-Richardson, Head of School / Principal
