= Britnee Timberlake =

Member of the New Jersey General Assembly

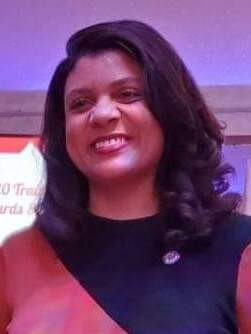
- Timberlake in 2020

Member of the New Jersey Senate from the 34th district
- Incumbent
- Assumed office January 9, 2024
- Preceded by: Nia Gill

Member of the New Jersey General Assembly from the 34th district
- In office January 29, 2018 – January 9, 2024 Serving with Thomas P. Giblin
- Preceded by: Sheila Oliver
- Succeeded by: Carmen Morales; Michael Venezia

Personal details
- Born: May 14, 1986 (age 40)
- Party: Democratic
- Education: Seton Hall University (BA, MPA)
- Website: State Senate website

Britnee N. Timberlake (born May 14, 1986) is an American Democratic Party elected official, community advocate, nonprofit executive, and humanitarian. She has represented the 34th Legislative District in the New Jersey Senate since January 2024, when she became New Jersey's youngest state senator. Before she took office in the senate, Timberlake had represented the 34th District in the New Jersey General Assembly from January 29, 2018, when she was sworn in to replace Sheila Oliver, who took office as Lieutenant Governor of New Jersey. Timberlake had served as Freeholder President of the Essex County Board of Chosen Freeholders, where she was at the time the state's only African-American woman to serve as a freeholder board leader.

== Early life, family and education ==
Timberlake is the daughter of Philip Timberlake, a sergeant in the US Army's 82nd Airborne; and Cathy Walsh Timberlake, an educator of the mentally and physically challenged.

Britnee Timberlake was educated at Seton Hall University, earning a bachelor's degree in political science and a master's degree in public administration.

== Early career ==
In 2010, she served as an AmeriCorps member in Union County, New Jersey where she worked on welfare to work initiatives, resume writing, GED clinics, and career advancement programs. In 2012, she served as the housing chair of the Montclair NAACP where she and her team integrated affordable housing throughout Montclair, previously only concentrated in the 4th ward.

In 2011, with Harold Simon, the former publisher of ShelterForce magazine, she co-founded and became the Executive Director of the Essex Community Land Trust (ECLT), a nonprofit organization that is New Jersey's only active affordable housing community land trust. The mission is to strengthen communities by providing permanently affordable housing and financial empowerment opportunities for working families and individuals throughout Essex County. In this role, with less than $20,000 in seed money, Timberlake launched the organization from incorporation to operation. She created and grew the organization's housing portfolio, board, community partnerships, and funding base. To date, the organization has raised over $2,000,000 in housing subsidies, created community development partnerships, helped to extend the affordability deed restrictions for over 50 homes in Montclair, and participated in the rehab and creation of 13 traditional CLT units.

== Early political career ==
She was elected to represent District 3 of the Essex County Board of Chosen Freeholders in 2014 and was selected as the board's president (succeeding Blonnie R. Watson) at the board's annual reorganization meeting in January 2015. She took office as the county's youngest freeholder under its current system of representation and when chosen as freeholder president became the state's only African American woman to be the head of a freeholder board. At the time, Essex County had a budget of over $700 million.

During her tenure as Freeholder President, Timberlake authored an affirmative action law that established a county government bid set-aside and joint venture program to increase economic opportunity for women-owned, minority-owned, and veteran-owned businesses. Timberlake also created a law that required all banks the county conducts business with to provide evidence of their efforts to reduce foreclosures, provide loans to entrepreneurs, assist low-to-moderate-income communities, and maintain vacant homes they own. Additionally, she spearheaded the Essex County Clean Jobs Initiative, a law that established both job training and placement for Essex County’s unemployed and underemployed residents in environmental lead, asbestos, and contamination abatement. Furthermore, Timberlake advocated for the Sheriff’s Department to obtain body cameras for all officers.

As President of the Freeholder Board, she was the first elected official in the state to have a resolution pass in support of the state raising the minimum wage to $15.00 an hour; a law she later got to co-author and see through when she became a state assembly person.

== New Jersey General Assembly ==
Sheila Oliver, who had run for both Assembly and as Phil Murphy's running mate as Lieutenant Governor of New Jersey in the November 2017 general election, won both seats but was prohibited from serving in both simultaneously; her running for both seats provided Oliver with a backup in case she lost her race with Murphy and would allow the Democratic county members to choose a successor if she won both seats. After taking office in the Assembly on January 9, 2018, she resigned from her seat that same day. On January 29, Timberlake, who had been the only African American woman in the state serving as freeholder director, was sworn in to replace Oliver, a fellow resident of East Orange who had been the first African American woman to serve as speaker of the General Assembly and the first to be elected to a position covering the entire state.

During her tenure, in addition to being a prime author of the $15 minimum wage bill which became law in 2019, Timberlake introduced the Fair Work Week Act. This Act was to preserve shift workers’ access to rest in between shifts and permits shift workers access to consistent schedules that allow for time with family, rest, school, travel to and from work.

In January 2019, a bill sponsored by Assemblywoman Timberlake was signed into law requiring the NJ Attorney General to handle the investigation and prosecution of a crime in the event a person loses their life during an interaction with or while in the custody of law enforcement. This law garnered the support of the American Civil Liberties Union, the People’s Organization for Progress, the New Jersey State NAACP, the National Organization of Black Law Enforcement Executives, New Jersey Working Families, Faith in New Jersey, and countless other advocacy groups.

Assemblywoman Timberlake has also been a vocal advocate for gun control. In addition to supporting legislation to regulate fire arm purchases, in 2018, she called for a prohibition on the sale of certain toy guns and imitation firearms. The bill was created in response to the death of Tamir Rice, an Ohio resident killed during an interaction with a police officer while holding an imitation firearm. This bill was signed into law by Governor Murphy in January 2020.

Assemblywoman Timberlake has also been instrumental in improving maternal and infant health outcomes. She advocated for the passage of several bills aimed at reducing health disparities amongst women of color. These bills include requiring hospital emergency departments to ask any person of childbearing age about their recent pregnancy history; mandating health benefits coverage for fertility preservation services under certain health insurance plans; mandating health benefits and Medicaid coverage for breastfeeding support; and screening of newborn infants for spinal muscular atrophy, etc.

In 2020, she sponsored a bill to amend the process through which certain environmental permits are issued. The bill requires the New Jersey Department of Environmental Protection to evaluate, when reviewing certain permit applications, the environmental and public health stressors on overburdened communities of certain facilities such as landfills, waste incinerators, sewage plants and others that are a "major source" of air pollution as defined in the federal Clean Air Act. The status of being "overburdened" will be determined based on most recent U.S. Census data where at least 35 percent of households are low-income, at least 40 percent residents identify as a minority, or at least 40 percent of households have limited English language proficiency. The bill was signed into law in 2021.

She also sponsored a budget resolution to restore $46.5 million in funds to the state’s Affordable Housing Trust Fund to assist families.

== New Jersey Senate ==
After the 2021 apportionment was concluded, Clifton, East Orange, Montclair, and Orange were moved out of the district and Belleville, Bloomfield, East Orange, Glen Ridge, Nutley and Orange were added. Redistricting left the "new" District 34 without an incumbent state senator. In 2023, Timberlake announced she was running to be the State Senator for the newly drawn District 34.

Timberlake defeated her Republican challenger Joseph Belnome in the 2023 New Jersey Senate election.

=== Committees ===
Committee assignments for the 2024—2025 Legislative Session are:

- Economic Growth
- Transportation

=== District 34 ===
Each of the 40 districts in the New Jersey Legislature has one representative in the New Jersey Senate and two members in the New Jersey General Assembly. The representatives from the 34th District for the 2024—2025 Legislative Session are:

- Senator Britnee Timberlake (D)
- Assemblyman Carmen Morales (D)
- Assemblyman Michael Venezia (D)

== Later career outside of politics ==
In 2023, Timberlake became the Chief Community Development officer at a credit union. There she is responsible for designing socially conscious banking products to help close the racial wealth gap.

== International relations and humanitarian work ==
In various capacities, Timberlake has hosted six international delegations from West Africa. She completed missionary work in Jamaica in 2007. She partners with Embrace Relief and Sandji CDC to provide relief to countries in need of water and transportation.

== Personal life ==
A resident of East Orange, New Jersey, she is married to Dimitri Charles, a Newark fireman and small business owner. Timberlake and her husband have four sons together as well as two older sons, part of a blended family. Timberlake was sworn into the Assembly while nine months pregnant with her first child.

== Awards ==
Timberlake has received many awards for her work in public service. Some of the notable awards include:

- The first inductee in the Housing and Community Development Network of New Jersey’s Hall of Heroes for her advocacy to restore $15 million to the State’s Affordable Housing Trust Fund.
- “Legislator of the Year Award” from NJ Citizen's Action
- “Community Leadership Award” from H.A.N.D.S (Housing & Neighborhood Development Services, Inc.)
- “Community Development Champion Award” from the Housing & Community Development Network of NJ
- 2013 Resolution by the NJ General Assembly for housing nonprofit community leadership & social enterprise
- “Amiga Award” from LUPE Fund, Inc.
- “Presidential Award for Leadership” from the NJ State African American Chamber of Commerce
- “Breaking Glass Ceilings Award” from New Leaders Council
- “United Nations-UNESCO School-Based Initiative Young CEOs Award”
- “Power of Dreams Award” from Danny Glover
- “Donald Payne, Sr. Award” from the Montclair NAACP
- “Coretta Scott King Award” for community service by Essex County’s, County Executive

== Electoral history ==
=== Senate ===
34th Legislative District General Election, 2023
Party	Candidate	Votes	%
Democratic	Britnee N. Timberlake	18,677	76.1
Republican	Joseph Belnome	5,875	23.9
Total votes		24,552	100.0
Democratic hold			

=== General Assembly ===
34th legislative district general election, 2021
Party	Candidate	Votes	%
Democratic	Thomas P. Giblin (incumbent)	36,717	39.29%
Democratic	Britnee N. Timberlake (incumbent)	36,392	38.94%
Republican	Irene DeVita	10,107	10.82%
Republican	Tafari K. Anderson	9,830	10.52%
Stop The Insanity	Clenard H. Childress Jr.	401	0.43%
Total votes		93,447	100.0
Democratic hold			

34th Legislative District General Election, 2019
Party	Candidate	Votes	%
Democratic	Thomas Giblin (incumbent)	17,849	41.62%
Democratic	Britnee Timberlake (incumbent)	17,441	40.66%
Republican	Bharat Rana	3,527	8.22%
Republican	Irene DeVita	3,453	8.05%
Stop The Insanity!	Clenard Childress, Jr.	620	1.45%
Total votes		42,319	100%
Democratic hold			

34th Legislative District general election, 2017
Party	Candidate	Votes	%	±%
Democratic	Sheila Oliver (incumbent)	34,340	43.0	▲1.1
Democratic	Thomas P. Giblin (incumbent)	32,751	41.0	▼1.3
Republican	Nicholas G. Surgent	6,637	8.3	▼4.4
Republican	Tafari Anderson	6,110	7.7	N/A
Total votes		79,838	100.0	
Democratic hold				
