= 2023 New Jersey elections =

- November 7, 2023

A general election was held in the U.S. state of New Jersey on November 7, 2023. Primary elections were held on June 6. All 80 seats in the New Jersey General Assembly for two-year terms, and all 40 seats in the State Senate for four-year terms. In addition to the State Legislative elections, numerous county offices and County Commissioners, in addition to municipal offices, were up for election. There were no statewide ballot questions this year, though some counties and municipalities may have had a local question asked. Non-partisan local elections, some school board elections, and some fire district elections also happened throughout the year.

== State legislature ==
=== State Senate ===
2023 New Jersey State Senate election
- November 7, 2023

All 40 seats in the New Jersey Senate 21 seats needed for a majority

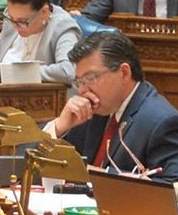
	Majority party	Minority party
Leader	Nicholas Scutari	Anthony M. Bucco
Party	Democratic	Republican
Leader since	January 11, 2022	July 1, 2023
Leader's seat	22nd (Linden)	25th (Boonton Twp.)
Last election	24 seats	16 seats
Seats before	25	15
Seats won	25	15
Seat change	Steady	Steady
Popular vote	922,977	772,680
Percentage	54.2%	45.4%
Swing	▲2.3%	▼2.6%
- Democratic hold Democratic gain Republican hold Republican gain
Senate President before election
Nicholas Scutari
Democratic
Elected Senate President
Nicholas Scutari
Democratic

The 2023 New Jersey State Senate elections were held on November 7, 2023. New Jersey voters elected state senators in all of the state's legislative districts for a four-year term to the New Jersey Senate. This was the first election after redistricting following the 2020 United States census. The winners of these elections will be sworn in on January 9, 2024.

The New Jersey Democratic Party flipped one seat, the third district. The New Jersey Republican Party picked up the twelfth district from an elected Republican who had switched to the Democratic Party.

=== General Assembly ===
2023 New Jersey General Assembly election
- November 7, 2023

All 80 seats in the New Jersey General Assembly 41 seats needed for a majority
- Registered: 6,459,097
- Turnout: 27% ▼13 pp
	Majority party	Minority party
Leader	Craig Coughlin	John DiMaio
Party	Democratic	Republican
Leader since	January 9, 2018	January 11, 2022
Leader's seat	19th (Woodbridge)	23rd (Hackettstown)
Last election	46 seats	34 seats
Seats before	46	34
Seats won	52	28
Seat change	▲6	▼6
Popular vote	1,804,115	1,575,074
Percentage	53.2%	46.4%
Swing	▲1.6%	▼1.8%
- Results: Democratic hold Democratic gain Republican hold
Speaker before election
Craig Coughlin
Democratic
Elected Speaker
Craig Coughlin
Democratic

The 2023 New Jersey General Assembly elections were held on November 7, 2023. New Jersey voters elected two Assembly members in all of the state's legislative districts for a two-year term to the New Jersey General Assembly. This was the first election after the 2020 census. Democrats expanded their majority in the chamber by picking up both seats in the 3rd and 11th districts, and one each in the 8th and 30th..
