= Thomas P. Giblin =

Member of the New Jersey General Assembly

Member of the New Jersey General Assembly from the 34th Legislative District
- Incumbent
- Assumed office January 10, 2006 Serving with Nia Gill; Britnee Timberlake
- Preceded by: Peter C. Eagler

Chairman of the New Jersey Democratic State Committee
- In office 1997–2001
- Preceded by: Tom Byrne
- Succeeded by: Joseph J. Roberts

Essex County Surrogate
- In office 1990–1993
- Preceded by: Bob Cottle
- Succeeded by: Joseph N. Brennan, Jr.

Member of the Essex County Board of County Commissioners
- In office January 1, 1982 – January 1, 1990
- In office January 1, 1977 – January 1, 1979

Personal details
- Born: January 15, 1947 (age 79) East Orange, New Jersey
- Party: Democratic
- Children: five
- Parent(s): John J. Giblin (Father); Theresa E. Moran (mother)
- Education: Seton Hall Preparatory School
- Alma mater: Seton Hall University (B.A.); Rutgers University
- Occupation: Union officer
- Website: Legislative website

Military service
- Allegiance: United States
- Branch/service: Air National Guard
- Years of service: 1966-1972
- Rank: Staff Sergeant
- Unit: New Jersey Air National Guard

Thomas P. Giblin (born January 15, 1947) is an American Democratic Party politician, who serves in the New Jersey General Assembly where he represents the 34th legislative district, having taken office on January 10, 2006. He has been the Assembly's Deputy Majority Leader since 2008.

== Biography and early career ==
Giblin was born on January 15, 1947, to John J. (1909–1975) and Theresa E. (née Moran) Giblin in East Orange. His father, a labor leader, served as a New Jersey state senator from 1966 to 1968 and as an Essex County commissioner after moving from County Roscommon, Ireland. Giblin was raised in Newark and attended Seton Hall Preparatory School. He served in the New Jersey Air National Guard from 1966 to 1972, achieving the rank of Staff Sergeant. He also attended Seton Hall University where he received a B.A. in political science. He has also partaken in some post-graduate studies at Seton Hall and Rutgers University In 1973, at the time a West Caldwell resident, Giblin lost his first campaign for public office, a bid for the Assembly from the 25th District. His Republican opponents were Thomas Kean and Jane Burgio.

He served as a member of the Essex County Board of County Commissioners from 1977 to 1978 and again from 1982 to 1990. Giblin served on the New Jersey Real Estate Commission from 1979 to 1982. In 1990, he was elected Essex County Surrogate (probate judge) defeating incumbent Bob Cottle. from 1990 to 1993. He served as the county surrogate until resigning in 1993 to run for Essex County Executive. In the June primary election following the resignation of Thomas J. D'Alessio who was eventually convicted of bribery and extortion, Giblin and East Orange mayor Cardell Cooper battled to a tie of 22,907 votes each. A judge decided in August that Cooper would be the Democratic nominee (he would lose to Republican James W. Treffinger in the general election). In 2002, he again ran for County Executive facing Commission President Joseph N. DiVincenzo, Jr. in the primary. Giblin accused DiVincenzo of being the focus of a federal inquiry; DiVincenzo got then-U.S. Attorney Chris Christie to specifically state that he was not the focus of any probe. Both campaigns spent a total of $4.2 million (in 2015 dollars) in what is the 13th most-expensive local race in the state's history; ultimately DiVincenzo defeated Giblin and won the general election.

He was a longtime chairman of the Essex County Democratic Committee serving from 1993 to 2003. In 1997, Giblin gave then-Woodbridge Township mayor Jim McGreevey the county organization line in that year's gubernatorial primary election. As the Democratic nominee traditionally chooses the next chairman of the New Jersey Democratic State Committee, McGreevey nominated Giblin to serve as the head of the state party that year. Giblin served as such from 1997 to 2001. He was the campaign chair of McGreevey's successful campaign in the 2001 gubernatorial election.

In December 1996, Giblin was a member of the New Jersey State Electoral College, one of 15 electors casting their votes for the Clinton/Gore ticket following the 1996 presidential election. He was a member of the 2001 New Jersey Apportionment Commission, the group charged with redrawing the lines of the state's legislative districts following the 2000 Census.

Giblin is the business manager of the International Union of Operating Engineers, AFL–CIO, Local 68 based in West Caldwell. He is married, has five children and five grandchildren, and is a resident of Montclair.

== Assembly career ==
Giblin was elected to the Assembly on November 8, 2005, filling the seat of fellow Democrat Peter C. Eagler, who had held the seat in the Assembly since 2002 and was knocked off the legislative slate.

On November 20, 2006, investigators from the United States Postal Inspection Service and the United States Department of Labor raided Giblin's office as part of an undisclosed investigation, seizing documents and computer data.

In March 2023, Giblin announced his retirement after about 50 years in politics in both Essex County, and the state of New Jersey, meaning that his current hometown of Montclair will end up being represented by a new member of the General Assembly, once it gets shifted to the 27th Legislative District, after the elections in 2023.

=== Committees ===
Committee assignments for the current session are:

- Regulated Professions, Chair
- Higher Education
- Transportation and Independent Authorities

=== District 34 ===
Each of the 40 districts in the New Jersey Legislature has one representative in the New Jersey Senate and two members in the New Jersey General Assembly. The representatives from the 34th District for the 2022—23 Legislative Session are:

- Senator Nia Gill (D)
- Assemblyman Thomas P. Giblin (D)
- Assemblywoman Britnee Timberlake (D)

== Electoral history ==
=== New Jersey General Assembly ===
34th Legislative District general election, 2007
Party	Candidate	Votes	%
Democratic	Thomas P. Giblin (incumbent)	15,198	35.68
Democratic	Sheila Oliver (incumbent)	14,755	34.64
Republican	Robert C. Bianco	6,432	15.1
Republican	Clenard H. Childress	6,210	14.58
Total votes		42,595	100

==== Democratic Primaries ====
34th Legislative District democratic primaries, 2005
Candidate	Votes	%
Sheila Oliver (incumbent)	8,303	43.93
Thomas P. Giblin	7,644	40.44
Debbie Ellison	1,122	5.94
Vashti Johnson	974	5.15
Clenard H. Childress Jr	857	4.53
Total votes	18,900	99.99

New Jersey General Assembly
Preceded by Peter C. Eagler	Member of the New Jersey General Assembly for the 34th District; January 10, 2006 – present With: Sheila Oliver	Succeeded by Incumbent
Political offices
Preceded by Bob Cottle	Essex County Surrogate; 1990 – 1993	Succeeded by Joseph N. Brennan, Jr.
Party political offices
Preceded by B. Thomas Byrne, Jr.	Chairman of the New Jersey Democratic State Committee; 1997 – 2001	Succeeded by Joseph J. Roberts
