= Vin Gopal =

Member of the New Jersey Senate (born 1985)

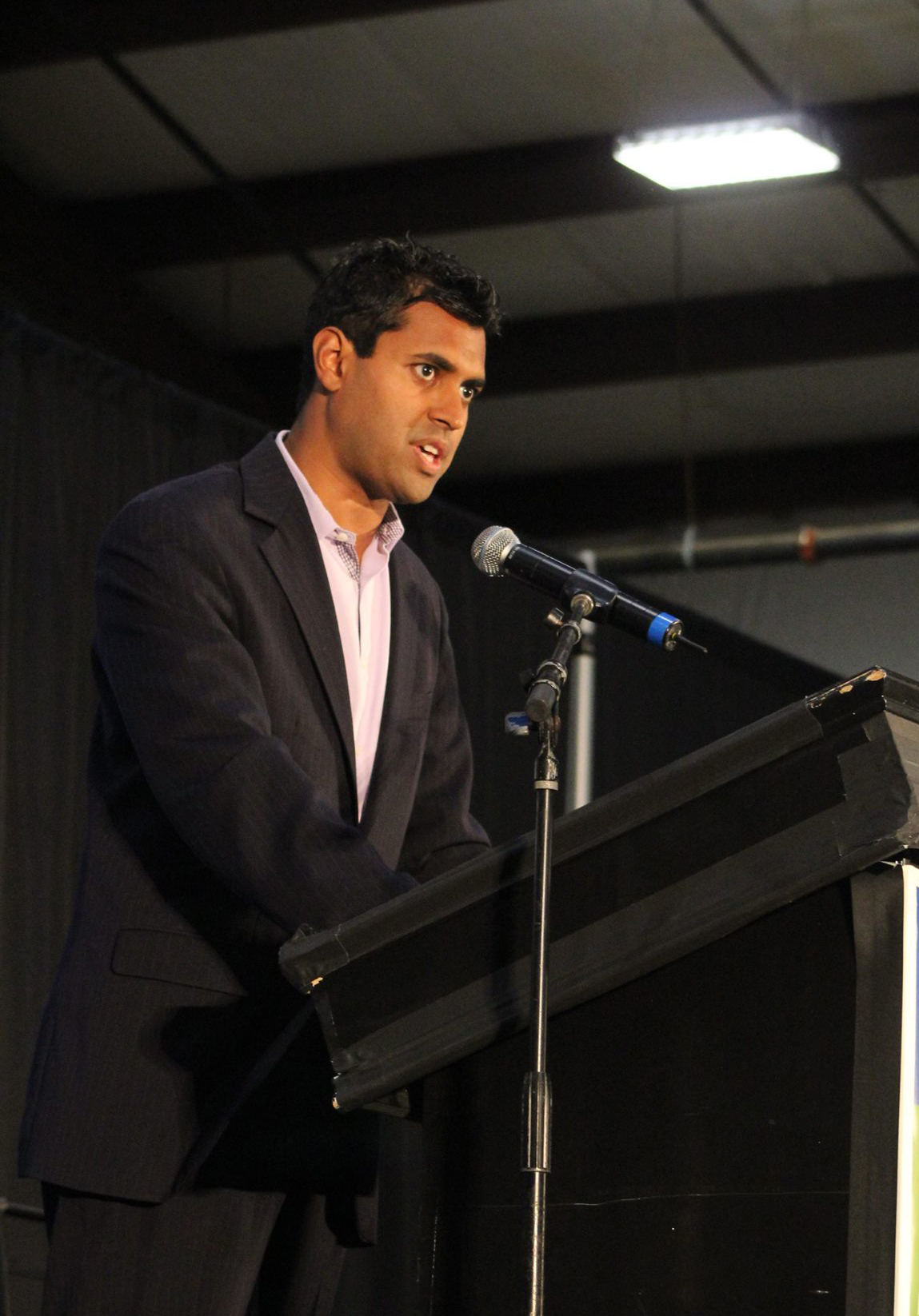

Member of the New Jersey Senate from the 11th district
- Incumbent
- Assumed office January 9, 2018
- Preceded by: Jennifer Beck

Personal details
- Born: May 18, 1985 (age 41) Neptune Township, New Jersey, U.S.
- Party: Democratic
- Education: Pennsylvania State University (BA); Rutgers University, Newark (MPA)

Vin Gopal (born May 18, 1985) is an American Democratic politician who took office on January 9, 2018, to represent the 11th Legislative District in the New Jersey Senate, which covers portions of Monmouth County. Gopal serves as Chairman of the Senate Education Committee and in Senate leadership as Senate Majority Whip.

== Early life ==
Vin Gopal was born in Neptune Township to Malayali parents from Kerala, India. His parents came to the United States in the early 1970s and settled in New Jersey. He grew up in Freehold Township. He graduated in 2003 from Ranney School in Tinton Falls. Gopal holds a bachelor's degree from Pennsylvania State University and a master's degree from Rutgers University. Gopal is a successful entrepreneur, having built up and sold various small-businesses. He is also a member of the International Brotherhood of Electrical Workers Local 400 in Wall Township He is a resident of Long Branch. While in high school and college, Senator Gopal served as a volunteer Emergency Medical Technician and First Responder and Certified First Aid Instructor for the Colts Neck Township and Freehold Township First Aid Squads. Gopal served on the Board of Trustees of Big Brothers, Big Sisters of Monmouth County from 2010 to 2012. Gopal previously served on the board of directors of the Northern Monmouth Chamber of Commerce, now called the Monmouth County Chamber of Commerce, from 2009 to 2012. From 2010 to 2013, Gopal served as President of the Hazlet Business Owners Association. Gopal is also President of the Vin Gopal Civic Association, a 501c3 organization, which helps local families and charities in need.

== Monmouth County Democratic Party ==
In his 20s, Gopal ran for Chairman of the Monmouth County Democratic Organization. He was elected Chairman with 73% of the vote. As Chairman, Gopal led the 2015 campaign for General Assembly, where he helped oust Republican incumbents Caroline Casagrande and Mary Pat Angelini by newcomers Eric Houghtaling and Joann Downey, in what was widely considered a major upset. As Chairman, Gopal was featured in PolitickerNJ.com's 100 Most Powerful people in New Jersey Politics in 2015 and 2016. In 2017, Gopal resigned the Chairmanship, announcing his intention to run for Senate in the 11th Legislative District against Republican incumbent Jennifer Beck. Gopal ran alongside first-term Democratic incumbents Eric Houghtaling and Joann Downey.. Under Gopal's tenure as party chair from 2012 to 2017, he helped flip mayoral seats from Republican to Democrat in municipalities including Matawan, Atlantic Highlands, Howell Township, Oceanport and Shrewsbury Township. He led the effort for Democrats to win council seats for the first time in Allentown, Fair Haven, Neptune City and Union Beach.

== Federal redistricting commissioner ==
Gopal was appointed by Speaker Craig Coughlin to serve on the New Jersey Redistricting Commission in 2021. He advocated to merge Chris Smith and Andy Kim's congressional districts by placing Smith's hometown of Hamilton Township in Kim's 3rd Congressional District. Gopal argued that there was more in common between Western Monmouth County and Mercer County than there was with Mercer and Ocean counties. Tiebreaker, retired Supreme Court Justice John E. Wallace Jr. agreed. Smith relocated to Ocean County and ran in that congressional district instead, while Kim's seat became a safe Democratic seat.

== Sherrill for Governor ==
Gopal was named Chairman of then-Congresswoman Mikie Sherrill's campaign for Governor in June 2025, serving as a spokesperson, advisor and fundraiser for the Sherrill campaign. Sherrill was elected by a 13% margin in November 2025, bringing coattails that elected hundreds of new Democratic officials around the state, including five new seats in the General Assembly and Democratic majorities in municipalities such as Parsippany–Troy Hills and Bridgewater Township.

== New Jersey Senate ==
In November 2017, Gopal was elected to the State Senate. Gopal is the first Indian-American to be elected to New Jersey's State Senate, and his victory was described by NJ.com as "perhaps the biggest upset of the night." Gopal won by 4,158 votes – dramatically outperforming Democratic Gubernatorial Candidate Phil Murphy. Gopal won numerous towns which Murphy lost, including Eatontown and Ocean Township. On January 9, 2018, shortly after his swearing-in, Gopal was appointed Vice-Chairman of the Senate Transportation Committee as well as a member of the Economic Growth Committee and Health, Human Services and Senior Citizens Committee. He is currently the youngest member of the New Jersey State Senate. On April 4, 2018, Gopal was named Senate Majority Conference Leader and Chairman of the Bipartisan Legislative Manufacturing Caucus. Gopal took both positions from Senator Robert M. Gordon, who resigned to accept a position with the BPU. On January 1 of 2019, Gopal was appointed Chairman of the Senate Military and Veterans Affairs Committee. Gopal has served as the Chairman of the powerful Senate Education Committee since January 2022 and member of Senate Leadership in 2025, become the new Majority Whip. He took the spot of Nellie Pou, who was elected to Congress.

In the 2021 elections, Republicans outperformed expectations statewide, with Republican gubernatorial candidate Jack Ciattarelli winning 2,500 more votes than incumbent Governor Phil Murphy in the 11th district and both Houghtaling and Downey losing re-election. Gopal nevertheless was narrowly re-elected as Senator by a margin of approximately 2,600 votes, running more than 5,000 votes ahead of Murphy; he was the only Democratic state legislator to win in a district carried by Ciattarelli. As a result of Houghtaling and Downey's losses, he was also left as the only Democrat representing Monmouth County in the state legislature.

In the 2023 elections, Gopal won by 21 percentage points against Republican Steve Dnistrian, outperforming expectations in what was forecasted to be a competitive race. Gopal's Democratic running mates for seats in the General Assembly, Margie Donlon and Luanne Peterpaul, defeated Republican incumbents Marilyn Piperno and Kimberly Eulner by smaller margins. "But when results actually started coming in, it was clear that Gopal had been dramatically underestimated. The two-term Democrat beat Dnistrian by nearly 12,000 votes, 33,558 to 21,866 – an astonishing 60%-39% margin. (Those numbers remain unofficial for now, with provisional ballots still to be counted.)... Gopal’s victory was easily enough to get his two running mates, Assemblywomen-elect Margie Donlon (D-Ocean Township) and Luanne Peterpaul (D-Long Branch), elected against incumbent Republicans Marilyn Piperno (R-Colts Neck) and Kim Eulner (R-Shrewsbury).... Donlon and Peterpaul currently have a combined 56.5% of the vote, an extremely robust total against two incumbents." Gopal's margin was so massive, based on town by town results, he won chunks of Republican votes in each town. For example, the small community of Deal which voted overwhelmingly for Donald Trump in 2016 and 2020, voted for Gopal overwhelmingly in 2023.

=== Committees ===
Committee assignments for the 2024-2025 session are:

- Education (as chair)
- Judiciary

=== Legislative accomplishments ===
==== Animal welfare ====
In 2023, Gopal sponsored a law to prohibit confining pigs in gestation crates. A similar measure was vetoed by Governor Chris Christie in 2013. A law that Gopal proposed for the welfare of animals was introduced to Senate in January 2026. The law requires specific animals used in testing to be made available for adoption; calls for formal assessments and protocols, and imposes penalties for noncompliance

=== Education ===
Gopal introduced a law to reform, regulate and modernize charter schools in New Jersey.

Gopal secured millions of dollars for youth mental health in New Jersey.

==== Economy ====
Gopal has advocated for mandated consolidation of school districts as part of an effort to lower property taxes.

Gopal supported legislation to help with New Jersey's film tax credits which helped bring Netflix to New Jersey.

=== Ethics ===
Gopal has been one of the Senate’s harshest critics of judges who mishandle sexual assault cases. Gopal led for the removal of Judge John F. Russo after he asked a rape victim why she didn't 'close her legs' to avoid the rape. Gopal joined domestic violence and rape crisis advocates in pushing for the court to remove Russo. He also called for the removal of Judge Troiano who said the accused came from a good family and should get a break in the alleged rape of a 16-year-old girl whose suspected assailant, also age 16, videotaped the assault. “Judge Troiano must resign, effective immediately, from any judicial posts he still holds – just based on his commentary and word-for-word thought process by his direct quotes,” Gopal said. “Situations like these destabilize the public’s trust in our judicial institutions. His comments regarding the accused ‘coming from a good family’ are disgraceful.”

Gopal led the effort to eliminate badges for non law-enforcement officials. The bill came after a Port Authority of New York and New Jersey Commissioner tried to get out of a police stop by waving her badge. The bill also banned all elected officials, including state legislators, mayors and councilmembers from carrying badges.

=== Healthcare ===
Gopal has been an opponent of Pharmacy Benefit Managers.(PBMs)

Gopal has led on pay parity, forcing insurance companies to cover virtual visits for mental health.

=== Human Trafficking ===
Gopal has promoted legislation in the Senate that go after the operators who are trafficking young women and men.

==== Social issues ====
Gopal was a main sponsor of codifying a constitutional right to freedom of reproductive choice, making New Jersey one of the strongest women's healthcare protections states. He also sponsored the law to codify same-sex marriage into state law.

In 2018, Gopal sponsored a law to ban smoking on New Jersey beaches.

=== District 11 ===
Each of the 40 districts in the New Jersey Legislature has one representative in the New Jersey Senate and two members in the New Jersey General Assembly. The representatives from the 11th District for the 2024—2025 Legislative Session are:

- Senator Vin Gopal (D)
- Assemblywoman Margie Donlon (D)
- Assemblywoman Luanne Peterpaul (D)

== Electoral history ==
=== Senate ===
New Jersey 11th Senate district election, 2023
Party	Candidate	Votes	%	±%
Democratic	Vin Gopal (incumbent)	34,350	60.3	▲8.4
Republican	Steve Dnistrian	22,172	38.9	▼9.2
NJ Patriot	Karen Zaletel	439	0.8	
Total votes		56,961	100.0	
Democratic hold				

New Jersey 11th Senate district election, 2021
Party	Candidate	Votes	%	±%
Democratic	Vin Gopal	36,978	51.9	▼1.7
Republican	Lori L. Annetta	34,296	48.1	▲1.7
Total votes		71,274	100.0	
Democratic hold				

New Jersey 11th Senate district election, 2017
Party	Candidate	Votes	%	±%
Democratic	Vin Gopal	31,308	53.6	▲14.8
Republican	Jennifer Beck (incumbent)	27,150	46.4	▼13.6
Total votes		58,458	100.0	
Democratic gain from Republican				

=== Assembly ===
New Jersey general election, 2011
Party	Candidate	Votes	%
Republican	Caroline Casagrande	18,739	26.8
Republican	Mary Pat Angelini	18,479	26.4
Democratic	Vin Gopal	15,392	22.0
Democratic	Kathleen Horgan	15,060	21.5
Demand A Voice	Daniel Jacobson	2,358	3.4
Total votes		70,028	100.0

== Personal life ==
Gopal married to Christina Zuk in September 2019.

== See also ==
- Community journalism
- Indian Americans in New Jersey
