= 2021 New Jersey General Assembly election =

- November 2, 2021

All 80 seats in the New Jersey General Assembly 41 seats needed for a majority
- Turnout: 40% (▲13pp)
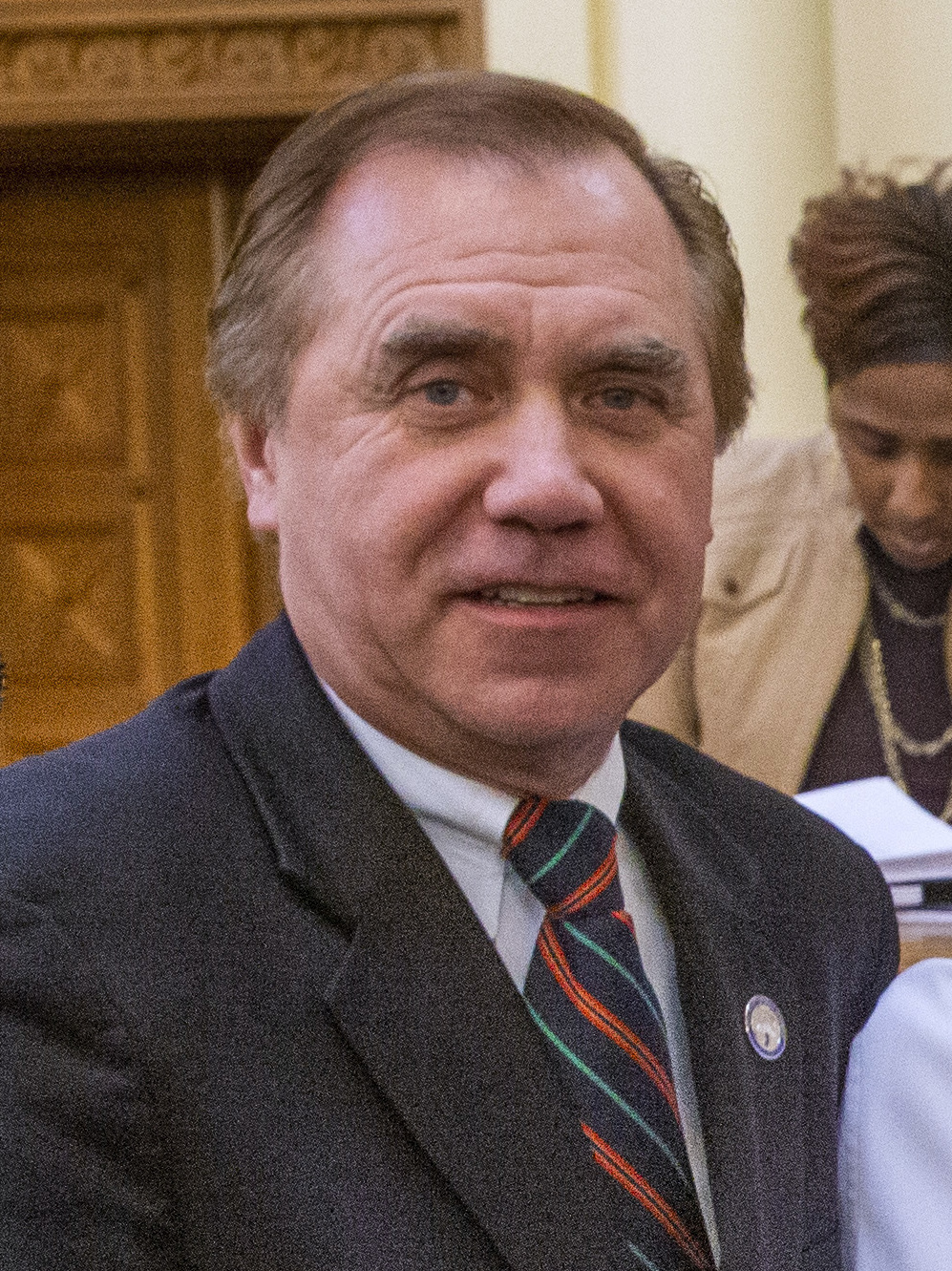

	Majority party	Minority party
Leader	Craig Coughlin	Jon Bramnick (retired)
Party	Democratic	Republican
Leader since	January 9, 2018	January 17, 2012
Leader's seat	19th (Woodbridge)	21st (Westfield) (ran for Senate)
Last election	52 seats	28 seats
Seats before	52	28
Seats won	46	34
Seat change	▼6	▲6
Popular vote	2,521,259	2,351,564
Percentage	51.6%	48.2%
Swing	▼9.33%	▲9.13%
- Results: Democratic hold Republican hold Republican gain
Speaker before election
Craig Coughlin
Democratic
Elected Speaker
Craig Coughlin
Democratic

The 2021 New Jersey General Assembly election was held on November 2, 2021. New Jersey voters elected two assembly members in all of the state's legislative districts for a two-year term to the New Jersey General Assembly.

All 80 seats of the New Jersey General Assembly were up for election. Democrats held a 52–28 majority in the lower house prior to the election. The members of the New Jersey Legislature are chosen from 40 electoral districts. Each district elects one state senator and two state assembly members. New Jersey uses coterminous legislative districts for both its State Senate and General Assembly.

Ultimately, Republicans gained six seats in the chamber, reducing Democrats' majority to 46–34. They flipped both seats in the 2nd, 3rd, and 11th districts.

== Incumbents not running for re-election ==
=== Democratic ===
- Nicholas Chiaravalloti, District 31 (lost party endorsement; withdrew from primary)
- Jamel Holley, District 20 (ran for State Senate)
- Valerie Huttle, District 37 (ran for State Senate)
- Gordon M. Johnson, District 37 (ran for State Senate)
- Vince Mazzeo, District 2 (ran for State Senate)
- Andrew Zwicker, District 16 (ran for State Senate)

=== Republican ===
- Jon Bramnick, District 21 (ran for State Senate)
- BettyLou DeCroce, District 26 (defeated in primary)
- Serena DiMaso, District 13 (lost party endorsement; defeated in primary)
- Ryan Peters, District 8 (retired from politics)
- Jean Stanfield, District 8 (ran for State Senate)

In addition, two members who were elected in the last election in 2019 have since resigned: Nancy Pinkin (D-18th), who was elected Middlesex County Clerk and Holly Schepisi (R-39th, after previously announcing a run for State Senate).

== Predictions ==
Source	Ranking	As of
New Jersey Globe	Safe D	October 28, 2021
Elections Daily	Safe D	November 1, 2021

== Results ==
=== Overview ===
Parties	Candidates	Seats				Popular vote		
Parties	Candidates	2019	2021	+/-	Strength	Vote	%	Change
Democratic	80	52	46	▼6	57%	2,521,259	51.6%	▼3.7
Republican	75	28	34	▲6	43%	2,351,564	48.2%	▲4.1
Libertarian	4	0	0	0	0%	2,947	0.1%	▲0.04
Green	1	0	0	0	0%	1,152	0.02%	N/A
Independent	6	0	0	0	0%	6,667	0.1%	▼0.3
Total	166	80	80		100.00%		100.00%	
Turnout								
Registered								

=== Summary of results by district ===
Legislative district	2020 Pres.	Incumbent	Party	Elected assembly member	Party
District 1	R +7	Erik Simonsen	Rep	Erik Simonsen	Rep
District 1	R +7	Antwan McClellan	Rep	Antwan McClellan	Rep
District 2	D+10.72	Vince Mazzeo	Dem	Claire Swift	Rep
District 2	D+10.72	John Armato	Dem	Don Guardian	Rep
District 3	R+1.56	John J. Burzichelli	Dem	Beth Sawyer	Rep
District 3	R+1.56	Adam Taliaferro	Dem	Bethanne McCarthy-Patrick	Rep
District 4	D+14.63	Paul D. Moriarty	Dem	Paul D. Moriarty	Dem
District 4	D+14.63	Gabriela Mosquera	Dem	Gabriela Mosquera	Dem
District 5	D+25.92	William Spearman	Dem	William Spearman	Dem
District 5	D+25.92	Bill Moen	Dem	Bill Moen	Dem
District 6	D+35.95	Louis Greenwald	Dem	Louis Greenwald	Dem
District 6	D+35.95	Pamela Rosen Lampitt	Dem	Pamela Rosen Lampitt	Dem
District 7	D+31.46	Herb Conaway	Dem	Herb Conaway	Dem
District 7	D+31.46	Carol A. Murphy	Dem	Carol A. Murphy	Dem
District 8	D+6.84	Ryan Peters	Rep	Michael Torrissi	Rep
District 8	D+6.84	Jean Stanfield	Rep	Brandon Umba	Rep
District 9	R+22.36	Brian E. Rumpf	Rep	Brian E. Rumpf	Rep
District 9	R+22.36	DiAnne Gove	Rep	DiAnne Gove	Rep
District 10	R+22.45	Gregory P. McGuckin	Rep	Gregory P. McGuckin	Rep
District 10	R+22.45	John Catalano	Rep	John Catalano	Rep
District 11	D+11.75	Eric Houghtaling	Dem	Marilyn Piperno	Rep
District 11	D+11.75	Joann Downey	Dem	Kim Eulner	Rep
District 12	R+13.49	Ronald S. Dancer	Rep	Ronald S. Dancer	Rep
District 12	R+13.49	Robert D. Clifton	Rep	Robert D. Clifton	Rep
District 13	R+5.59	Serena DiMaso	Rep	Vicky Flynn	Rep
District 13	R+5.59	Gerard Scharfenberger	Rep	Gerard Scharfenberger	Rep
District 14	D+17.14	Wayne DeAngelo	Dem	Wayne DeAngelo	Dem
District 14	D+17.14	Daniel R. Benson	Dem	Daniel R. Benson	Dem
District 15	D+51.42	Verlina Reynolds-Jackson	Dem	Verlina Reynolds-Jackson	Dem
District 15	D+51.42	Anthony Verrelli	Dem	Anthony Verrelli	Dem
District 16	D+21.84	Andrew Zwicker	Dem	Sadaf Jaffer	Dem
District 16	D+21.84	Roy Freiman	Dem	Roy Freiman	Dem
District 17	D+44.07	Joseph Danielsen	Dem	Joseph Danielsen	Dem
District 17	D+44.07	Joseph V. Egan	Dem	Joseph V. Egan	Dem
District 18	D+22.59	Sterley Stanley	Dem	Sterley Stanley	Dem
District 18	D+22.59	Robert Karabinchak	Dem	Robert Karabinchak	Dem
District 19	D+19.05	Craig Coughlin	Dem	Craig Coughlin	Dem
District 19	D+19.05	Yvonne Lopez	Dem	Yvonne Lopez	Dem
District 20	D+48.19	Annette Quijano	Dem	Annette Quijano	Dem
District 20	D+48.19	Jamel Holley	Dem	Reginald Atkins	Dem
District 21	D+18.36	Jon Bramnick	Rep	Michele Matsikoudis	Rep
District 21	D+18.36	Nancy Munoz	Rep	Nancy Munoz	Rep
District 22	D+34.29	James J. Kennedy	Dem	James J. Kennedy	Dem
District 22	D+34.29	Linda S. Carter	Dem	Linda S. Carter	Dem
District 23	R+2.65	Erik Peterson	Rep	Erik Peterson	Rep
District 23	R+2.65	John DiMaio	Rep	John DiMaio	Rep
District 24	R+17.41	Parker Space	Rep	Parker Space	Rep
District 24	R+17.41	Hal Wirths	Rep	Hal Wirths	Rep
District 25	D+9.25	Aura Dunn	Rep	Aura Dunn	Rep
District 25	D+9.25	Brian Bergen	Rep	Brian Bergen	Rep
District 26	R+2.25	BettyLou DeCroce	Rep	Christian Barranco	Rep
District 26	R+2.25	Jay Webber	Rep	Jay Webber	Rep
District 27	D+34.75	John F. McKeon	Dem	John F. McKeon	Dem
District 27	D+34.75	Mila Jasey	Dem	Mila Jasey	Dem
District 28	D+58.93	Cleopatra Tucker	Dem	Cleopatra Tucker	Dem
District 28	D+58.93	Ralph R. Caputo	Dem	Ralph R. Caputo	Dem
District 29	D+58.53	Eliana Pintor Marin	Dem	Eliana Pintor Marin	Dem
District 29	D+58.53	Shanique Speight	Dem	Shanique Speight	Dem
District 30	R+30.04	Sean T. Kean	Rep	Sean T. Kean	Rep
District 30	R+30.04	Ned Thomson	Rep	Ned Thomson	Rep
District 31	D+51.83	Angela V. McKnight	Dem	Angela V. McKnight	Dem
District 31	D+51.83	Nicholas Chiaravalloti	Dem	William Sampson	Dem
District 32	D+31.37	Angelica M. Jimenez	Dem	Angelica M. Jimenez	Dem
District 32	D+31.37	Pedro Mejia	Dem	Pedro Mejia	Dem
District 33	D+52.89	Raj Mukherji	Dem	Raj Mukherji	Dem
District 33	D+52.89	Annette Chaparro	Dem	Annette Chaparro	Dem
District 34	D+58.59	Thomas P. Giblin	Dem	Thomas P. Giblin	Dem
District 34	D+58.59	Britnee Timberlake	Dem	Britnee Timberlake	Dem
District 35	D+40.89	Shavonda E. Sumter	Dem	Shavonda E. Sumter	Dem
District 35	D+40.89	Benjie E. Wimberly	Dem	Benjie E. Wimberly	Dem
District 36	D+12.89	Gary Schaer	Dem	Gary Schaer	Dem
District 36	D+12.89	Clinton Calabrese	Dem	Clinton Calabrese	Dem
District 37	D+38.18	Gordon M. Johnson	Dem	Ellen Park	Dem
District 37	D+38.18	Valerie Huttle	Dem	Shama Haider	Dem
District 38	D+13.38	Lisa Swain	Dem	Lisa Swain	Dem
District 38	D+13.38	Chris Tully	Dem	Chris Tully	Dem
District 39	D+4.6	DeAnne DeFuccio	Rep	DeAnne DeFuccio	Rep
District 39	D+4.6	Robert Auth	Rep	Robert Auth	Rep
District 40	R+0.03	Kevin J. Rooney	Rep	Kevin J. Rooney	Rep
District 40	R+0.03	Christopher DePhillips	Rep	Christopher DePhillips	Rep

=== Close races ===
Districts where the difference of total votes between the top-two parties was under 10%:

1. District 11, 0.80% gain
2. District 8, 3.96%
3. District 3, 4.68% gain
4. District 16, 4.76%
5. District 38, 4.88%
6. District 4, 5.53%
7. District 21, 6.56%
8. District 2, 6.94% gain

== District 1 ==
=== Republican primary ===
Republican primary
Party	Candidate	Votes	%
Republican	Erik Simonsen (incumbent)	13,535	50.7%
Republican	Antwan McClellan (incumbent)	13,179	49.3%
Total votes		26,714	100.0%

=== Democratic primary ===
Democratic primary
Party	Candidate	Votes	%
Democratic	John P. Capizola Jr.	9,147	50.4%
Democratic	Christopher C. Wilson	9,005	49.6%
Total votes		18,152	100.0%

Following the primary, Wilson withdrew from the general election on August 31. Former NJ DHS official Julia Hankerson was added to the ballot as a replacement candidate on September 8.

=== General election ===
Polling

Poll source	Date(s) administered	Sample size	Margin of error	Erik Simonsen (R)	Antwan McClellan (R)	John Capizola (D)	Julia Hankerson (D)	Undecided
Stockton University	September 28 – October 10, 2021	407 (RV)	± 4.8%	25%	23%	19%	19%	10%

Predictions

Source	Ranking	As of
New Jersey Globe	Likely R	October 28, 2021
Elections Daily	Safe R	November 1, 2021

Results

1st legislative district general election, 2021
Party	Candidate	Votes	%
Republican	Erik Simonsen (incumbent)	40,803	31.61%
Republican	Antwan McClellan (incumbent)	40,405	31.30%
Democratic	John P. Capizola Jr.	23,818	18.45%
Democratic	Julia L. Hankerson	23,055	17.86%
Libertarian	Michael Gallo	589	0.46%
Libertarian	Jacob Selwood	399	0.31%
Total votes		129,069	100.00
Republican hold			

== District 2 ==
=== Democratic primary ===
Democratic primary
Party	Candidate	Votes	%
Democratic	John Armato (incumbent)	9,122	50.4%
Democratic	Caren Fitzpatrick	8,990	49.6%
Total votes		18,112	100.0%

=== Republican primary ===
Republican primary
Party	Candidate	Votes	%
Republican	Don Guardian	9,784	50.7%
Republican	Claire Swift	9,516	49.3%
Total votes		19,300	100.0%

=== General election ===
Polling

Poll source	Date(s) administered	Sample size	Margin of error	John Armato (D)	Caren Fitzpatrick (D)	Don Guardian (R)	Claire Swift (R)	Undecided
Stockton University	October 9–24, 2021	401 (LV)	± 4.9%	23%	24%	22%	23%	7%

Predictions

Source	Ranking	As of
New Jersey Globe	Tossup	October 28, 2021
Elections Daily	Lean D	November 1, 2021

Debate

2021 New Jersey's 2nd Assembly district debate
No.	Date	Host	Moderator	Link	Democratic	Democratic	Republican	Republican
Key: P Participant A Absent N Not invited I Invited W Withdrawn								
Key: P Participant A Absent N Not invited I Invited W Withdrawn					John Armato	Caren Fitzpatrick	Don Guardian	Claire Swift
1	Oct. 6, 2021	The Press of Atlantic City; Stockton University at Atlantic City	John Froonjian		P	P	P	P

Results

2nd legislative district general election, 2021
Party	Candidate	Votes	%
Republican	Claire Swift	31,818	26.81%
Republican	Don Guardian	31,640	26.66%
Democratic	John Armato (incumbent)	28,094	23.67%
Democratic	Caren Fitzpatrick	27,127	22.86%
Total votes		118,679	100.00
Republican gain from Democratic			

== District 3 ==
=== Democratic primary ===
Democratic primary
Party	Candidate	Votes	%
Democratic	John J. Burzichelli (incumbent)	8,863	50.1%
Democratic	Adam Taliaferro (incumbent)	8,826	49.9%
Total votes		17,689	100.0%

=== Republican primary ===
Republican primary
Party	Candidate	Votes	%
Republican	Bethanne McCarthy Patrick	8,517	91.3%
Republican	Beth Sawyer (write-in)	443	4.7%
Republican	Other write-ins	371	4.0%
Total votes		9,331	100.0%

=== General election ===
Predictions

Source	Ranking	As of
New Jersey Globe	Likely D	October 28, 2021
Elections Daily	Likely D	November 1, 2021

Results

3rd legislative district general election, 2021
Party	Candidate	Votes	%
Republican	Beth Sawyer	33,878	26.23%
Republican	Bethanne McCarthy Patrick	33,735	26.12%
Democratic	John J. Burzichelli (incumbent)	31,024	24.02%
Democratic	Adam Taliaferro (incumbent)	30,537	23.64%
Total votes		129,174	100.0
Republican gain from Democratic			

== District 4 ==
Democratic primary
Party	Candidate	Votes	%
Democratic	Paul D. Moriarty (incumbent)	12,448	50.2%
Democratic	Gabriela M. Mosquera (incumbent)	12,367	49.8%
Total votes		24,815	100.0%

=== Republican primary ===
Republican primary
Party	Candidate	Votes	%
Republican	Denise Gonzalez	7,095	94.2
Republican	Patricia Kline (write-in)	158	2.1
Republican	Other write-ins	275	3.7
Total votes		7,528	100.0%

=== General election ===
Predictions

Source	Ranking	As of
New Jersey Globe	Solid D	October 28, 2021
Elections Daily	Safe D	November 1, 2021

Results

4th legislative district general election, 2021
Party	Candidate	Votes	%
Democratic	Paul D. Moriarty (incumbent)	36,480	26.49%
Democratic	Gabriela M. Mosquera (incumbent)	35,561	25.83%
Republican	Patricia Kline	32,403	23.53%
Republican	Denise Gonzalez	32,025	23.26%
Libertarian	Nicholas Magner	1,218	0.88%
Total votes		137,687	100.0
Democratic hold			

== District 5 ==
=== Democratic primary ===
Democratic primary
Party	Candidate	Votes	%
Democratic	William F. Moen Jr. (incumbent)	12,597	50.0%
Democratic	William W. Spearman (incumbent)	12,573	50.0%
Total votes		25,170	100.0%

=== Republican primary ===
Republican primary
Party	Candidate	Votes	%
Republican	Samuel DiMatteo	4,847	50.6%
Republican	Sean Sepsey	4,736	49.4%
Total votes		9,583	100.0%

=== General election ===
Predictions

Source	Ranking	As of
New Jersey Globe	Solid D	October 28, 2021
Elections Daily	Safe D	November 1, 2021

Results

5th legislative district general election, 2021
Party	Candidate	Votes	%
Democratic	William F. Moen Jr. (incumbent)	30,442	28.74%
Democratic	William W. Spearman (incumbent)	30,059	28.38%
Republican	Samuel DiMatteo	23,007	21.72%
Republican	Sean Sepsey	22,413	21.16%
Total votes		105,921	100.0
Democratic hold			

== District 6 ==
=== Democratic primary ===
Democratic primary
Party	Candidate	Votes	%
Democratic	Louis D. Greenwald (incumbent)	17,909	50.3%
Democratic	Pamela R. Lampitt (incumbent)	17,710	49.7%
Total votes		35,619	100.0%

=== Republican primary ===
Republican primary
Party	Candidate	Votes	%
Republican	Ed Farmer	6,094	50.7%
Republican	Richard Super	5,931	49.3%
Total votes		12,025	100.0%

=== General election ===
Predictions

Source	Ranking	As of
New Jersey Globe	Solid D	October 28, 2021
Elections Daily	Safe D	November 1, 2021

Results

6th legislative district general election, 2021
Party	Candidate	Votes	%
Democratic	Louis D. Greenwald (incumbent)	48,497	33.07%
Democratic	Pamela R. Lampitt (incumbent)	47,612	32.46%
Republican	Ed Farmer	25,537	17.41%
Republican	Richard Super	25,015	17.06%
Total votes		146,661	100.0
Democratic hold			

== District 7 ==
=== Democratic primary ===
Democratic primary
Party	Candidate	Votes	%
Democratic	Herb Conaway (incumbent)	14,529	50.6%
Democratic	Carol Murphy (incumbent)	14,183	49.4%
Total votes		28,712	100.0%

=== Republican primary ===
Republican primary
Party	Candidate	Votes	%
Republican	Douglas Dillon	6,599	50.6%
Republican	Joseph Jesuele	6,441	49.4%
Total votes		13,040	100.0%

=== General election ===
Predictions

Source	Ranking	As of
New Jersey Globe	Solid D	October 28, 2021
Elections Daily	Safe D	November 1, 2021

Results

7th legislative district general election, 2021
Party	Candidate	Votes	%
Democratic	Herb Conaway (incumbent)	45,728	30.98%
Democratic	Carol Murphy (incumbent)	45,170	30.60%
Republican	Douglas Dillon	28,579	19.36%
Republican	Joseph Jesuele	28,139	19.06%
Total votes		147,616	100.0
Democratic hold			

== District 8 ==
=== Republican primary ===
Republican primary
Party	Candidate	Votes	%
Republican	Michael Torrissi Jr.	10,072	51.1%
Republican	Brandon Umba	9,657	48.9%
Total votes		19,729	100.0%

=== Democratic primary ===
Democratic primary
Party	Candidate	Votes	%
Democratic	Mark Natale	9,714	50.3%
Democratic	Allison Eckel	9,594	49.7%
Total votes		19,308	100.0%

=== General election ===
Predictions

Source	Ranking	As of
New Jersey Globe	Tossup	October 28, 2021
Elections Daily	Lean R	November 1, 2021

Results

8th legislative district general election, 2021
Party	Candidate	Votes	%
Republican	Michael Torrissi Jr.	40,467	26.45%
Republican	Brandon Umba	39,039	25.52%
Democratic	Allison Eckel	36,828	24.08%
Democratic	Mark Natale	36,634	23.95%
Total votes		152,968	100.0
Republican hold			

== District 9 ==
=== Republican primary ===
Republican primary
Party	Candidate	Votes	%
Republican	Brian E. Rumpf (incumbent)	17,293	51.0%
Republican	DiAnne C. Gove (incumbent)	16,635	49.0%
Total votes		33,928	100.0%

=== Democratic primary ===
Democratic primary
Party	Candidate	Votes	%
Democratic	Alexis Jackson	6,907	50.7%
Democratic	Kristen Henninger-Holland	6,716	49.3%
Total votes		13,623	100.0%

=== General election ===
Predictions

Source	Ranking	As of
New Jersey Globe	Solid R	October 28, 2021
Elections Daily	Safe R	November 1, 2021

Results

9th legislative district general election, 2021
Party	Candidate	Votes	%
Republican	Brian E. Rumpf (incumbent)	61,980	35.13%
Republican	DiAnne C. Gove (incumbent)	60,798	34.46%
Democratic	Alexis Jackson	26,975	15.29%
Democratic	Kristen Henninger-Holland	26,700	15.13%
Total votes		176,453	100.0
Republican hold			

== District 10 ==
=== Republican primary ===
Republican primary
Party	Candidate	Votes	%
Republican	John Catalano (incumbent)	11,119	30.3%
Republican	Gregory P. McGuckin (incumbent)	10,986	30.0%
Republican	Geraldine Ambrosio	7,332	20.0%
Republican	Brian M. Quinn	7,208	19.7%
Total votes		36,645	100.0%

=== Democratic primary ===
Democratic primary
Party	Candidate	Votes	%
Democratic	Garrit "Tony" Kono	5,870	50.1%
Democratic	Mary "Sharon" Quilter	5,846	49.9%
Total votes		11,716	100.0%

=== General election ===
Predictions

Source	Ranking	As of
New Jersey Globe	Solid R	October 28, 2021
Elections Daily	Safe R	November 1, 2021

Results

10th legislative district general election, 2021
Party	Candidate	Votes	%
Republican	Gregory P. McGuckin (incumbent)	55,871	34.61%
Republican	John Catalano (incumbent)	55,463	34.36%
Democratic	Mary "Sharon" Quilter	25,115	15.56%
Democratic	Garrit "Tony" Kono	24,986	15.48%
Total votes		161,435	100.0
Republican hold			

== District 11 ==
=== Democratic primary ===
Democratic primary
Party	Candidate	Votes	%
Democratic	Eric Houghtaling (incumbent)	7,836	50.1%
Democratic	Joann Downey (incumbent)	7,816	49.9%
Total votes		15,652	100.0%

=== Republican primary ===
Republican primary
Party	Candidate	Votes	%
Republican	Marilyn Piperno	7,201	50.6%
Republican	Kimberly Eulner	7,017	49.4%
Total votes		14,218	100.0%

=== General election ===
Predictions

Source	Ranking	As of
New Jersey Globe	Lean D	October 28, 2021
Elections Daily	Likely D	November 1, 2021

==== Endorsements ====
Joann Downey (D)

Organizations

- New Jersey League of Conservation Voters (co-endorsed with Houghtaling)
Eric Houghtaling (D)

Organizations

- New Jersey League of Conservation Voters (co-endorsed with Downey)
Dominique Faison (G)

Organizations

- Central New Jersey Socialist Party USA

Results

11th legislative district general election, 2021
Party	Candidate	Votes	%
Republican	Marilyn Piperno	35,336	25.05%
Republican	Kimberly Eulner	35,177	24.94%
Democratic	Joann Downey (incumbent)	34,830	24.69%
Democratic	Eric Houghtaling (incumbent)	34,555	24.50%
Green	Dominique Faison	1,152	0.82%
Total votes		141,050	100.0
Republican gain from Democratic			

== District 12 ==
=== Republican primary ===
Republican primary
Party	Candidate	Votes	%
Republican	Ronald S. Dancer (incumbent)	9,608	49.2%
Republican	Robert D. Clifton (incumbent)	9,312	47.7%
Republican	Ahmed Basuoni	602	3.1%
Total votes		19,522	100.0%

==== Endorsements ====
Robert D. Clifton

Organizations

- New Jersey League of Conservation Voters (co-endorsed with Dancer)
Ronald S. Dancer

Organizations

- New Jersey League of Conservation Voters (co-endorsed with Clifton)

=== Democratic primary ===
Democratic primary
Party	Candidate	Votes	%
Democratic	Raya Arbiol	5,250	50.2%
Democratic	Michael Palazzolla	5,202	49.8%
Total votes		10,452	100.0%

=== General election ===
Predictions

Source	Ranking	As of
New Jersey Globe	Solid R	October 28, 2021
Elections Daily	Safe R	November 1, 2021

Results

12th legislative district general election, 2021
Party	Candidate	Votes	%
Republican	Ronald S. Dancer (incumbent)	47,595	33.37%
Republican	Robert D. Clifton (incumbent)	46,378	32.52%
Democratic	Michael Palazzolla	24,642	17.28%
Democratic	Raya Arbiol	23,993	16.82%
Total votes		142,608	100.0
Republican hold			

== District 13 ==
=== Republican primary ===
Republican primary
Party	Candidate	Votes	%
Republican	Gerard P. Scharfenberger (incumbent)	8,993	36.7%
Republican	Vicky Flynn	8,778	35.8%
Republican	Serena DiMaso (incumbent)	6,719	27.4%
Total votes		24,490	100.0%

=== Democratic primary ===
Democratic primary
Party	Candidate	Votes	%
Democratic	Erin Howard	6,059	50.3%
Democratic	Allison Friedman	5,983	49.7%
Total votes		12,042	100.0%

=== General election ===
Predictions

Source	Ranking	As of
New Jersey Globe	Solid R	October 28, 2021
Elections Daily	Safe R	November 1, 2021

Results

13th legislative district general election, 2021
Party	Candidate	Votes	%
Republican	Gerard P. Scharfenberger (incumbent)	53,055	30.76%
Republican	Vicky Flynn	52,525	30.45%
Democratic	Allison Friedman	33,509	19.43%
Democratic	Erin Howard	33,396	19.36%
Total votes		172,485	100.0
Republican hold			

== District 14 ==
=== Democratic primary ===
Democratic primary
Party	Candidate	Votes	%
Democratic	Wayne P. DeAngelo (incumbent)	10,406	50.6%
Democratic	Daniel R. Benson (incumbent)	10,179	49.4%
Total votes		20,585	100.0%

==== Endorsements ====
Daniel R. Benson

Organizations

- New Jersey League of Conservation Voters (co-endorsed with DeAngelo)
Wayne DeAngelo

Organizations

- New Jersey League of Conservation Voters (co-endorsed with Benson)

=== Republican primary ===
Republican primary
Party	Candidate	Votes	%
Republican	Andrew Pachuta	6,697	51.8%
Republican	Bina Shah	6,227	48.2%
Total votes		12,924	100.0%

=== General election ===
Predictions

Source	Ranking	As of
New Jersey Globe	Solid D	October 28, 2021
Elections Daily	Safe D	November 1, 2021

Results

14th legislative district general election, 2021
Party	Candidate	Votes	%
Democratic	Wayne P. DeAngelo (incumbent)	40,836	28.29%
Democratic	Daniel R. Benson (incumbent)	40,241	27.85%
Republican	Andrew Pachuta	31,366	21.71%
Republican	Bina Shah	30,531	21.13%
For The People	Michael Bollentin	1,535	1.06%
Total votes		144,509	100.0
Democratic hold			

== District 15 ==
=== Democratic primary ===
Democratic primary
Party	Candidate	Votes	%
Democratic	Verlina Reynolds-Jackson (incumbent)	11,904	51.6%
Democratic	Anthony S. Verrelli (incumbent)	11,153	48.4%
Total votes		23,057	100.0%

==== Endorsements ====
Verlina Reynolds-Jackson

Organizations

- New Jersey League of Conservation Voters (co-endorsed with Verrelli)
Anthony Verrelli

Organizations

- New Jersey League of Conservation Voters (co-endorsed with Reynolds-Jackson)

=== Republican primary ===
Republican primary
Party	Candidate	Votes	%
Republican	Patricia "Pat" A. Johnson	3,011	98.5%
Republican	Write-in	45	1.5%
Total votes		3,056	100.0%

=== General election ===
Predictions

Source	Ranking	As of
New Jersey Globe	Solid D	October 28, 2021
Elections Daily	Safe D	November 1, 2021

Results

15th legislative district general election, 2021
Party	Candidate	Votes	%
Democratic	Anthony S. Verrelli (incumbent)	37,507	40.66%
Democratic	Verlina Reynolds-Jackson (incumbent)	37,214	40.34%
Republican	Patricia "Pat" A. Johnson	15,492	16.79%
Vote For Pedro	Pedro M. Reyes	2,042	2.21%
Total votes		92,255	100.0
Democratic hold			

== District 16 ==
=== Democratic primary ===
Democratic primary
Party	Candidate	Votes	%
Democratic	Sadaf F. Jaffer	9,383	44.2%
Democratic	Roy Freiman (incumbent)	8,889	41.8%
Democratic	Faris Zwirahn	2,979	14.0%
Total votes		21,251	100.0%

==== Endorsements ====
Roy Freiman

Labor unions

- SEIU 32BJ (co-endorsed with Jaffer)

Organizations

- New Jersey League of Conservation Voters (co-endorsed with Jaffer)
Sadaf F. Jaffer

US Representatives

- Ro Khanna, US Representative for California's 17th congressional district

Labor unions

- SEIU 32BJ (co-endorsed with Freiman)

Organizations

- New Jersey League of Conservation Voters (co-endorsed with Freiman)
- Working Families Party

=== Republican primary ===
Republican primary
Party	Candidate	Votes	%
Republican	Vincent T. Panico	10,113	50.9%
Republican	Joseph A. Lukac III	9,763	49.1%
Total votes		19,876	100.0%

=== General election ===
Predictions

Source	Ranking	As of
New Jersey Globe	Lean D	October 28, 2021
Elections Daily	Likely D	November 1, 2021

Results

16th legislative district general election, 2021
Party	Candidate	Votes	%
Democratic	Roy Freiman (incumbent)	40,992	26.67%
Democratic	Sadaf F. Jaffer	39,512	25.71%
Republican	Vincent T. Panico	36,924	24.03%
Republican	Joseph A. Lukac III	36,251	23.59%
Total votes		153,679	100.0
Democratic hold			

== District 17 ==
=== Democratic primary ===
Democratic primary
Party	Candidate	Votes	%
Democratic	Joseph V. Egan (incumbent)	9,029	50.6%
Democratic	Joseph Danielsen (incumbent)	8,825	49.4%
Total votes		17,854	100.0%

==== Endorsements ====
Joseph Danielsen

Organizations

- New Jersey League of Conservation Voters

=== Republican primary ===
Republican primary
Party	Candidate	Votes	%
Republican	Catherine Barrier	2,817	50.2%
Republican	Peter W. Gabra	2,796	49.8%
Total votes		5,613	100.0%

=== General election ===
Predictions

Source	Ranking	As of
New Jersey Globe	Solid D	October 28, 2021
Elections Daily	Safe D	November 1, 2021

Results

17th legislative district general election, 2021
Party	Candidate	Votes	%
Democratic	Joseph V. Egan (incumbent)	32,212	34.83%
Democratic	Joseph Danielsen (incumbent)	31,625	34.19%
Republican	Catherine Barrier	14,482	15.66%
Republican	Peter W. Gabra	14,173	15.32%
Total votes		92,492	100.0
Democratic hold			

== District 18 ==
=== Democratic primary ===
Democratic primary
Party	Candidate	Votes	%
Democratic	Robert Karabinchak (incumbent)	11,833	36.8%
Democratic	Sterley Stanley (incumbent)	11,731	36.5%
Democratic	Lisa Salem	4,820	15.0%
Democratic	Maurice Alfaro Sr.	3,745	11.7%
Total votes		32,129	100.0%

==== Endorsements ====
Robert Karabinchak

Organizations

- New Jersey League of Conservation Voters (co-endorsed with Stanley)
Sterley Stanley

Organizations

- New Jersey League of Conservation Voters (co-endorsed with Karabinchak)

=== Republican primary ===
Republican primary
Party	Candidate	Votes	%
Republican	Melanie McCann Mott	4,539	50.7%
Republican	Angela Fam	4,418	49.3%
Total votes		8,957	100.0%

=== General election ===
Predictions

Source	Ranking	As of
New Jersey Globe	Solid D	October 28, 2021
Elections Daily	Safe D	November 1, 2021

Results

18th legislative district general election, 2021
Party	Candidate	Votes	%
Democratic	Robert Karabinchak (incumbent)	33,685	29.27%
Democratic	Sterley Stanley (incumbent)	32,743	28.45%
Republican	Melanie McCann Mott	23,940	20.80%
Republican	Angela Fam	23,248	20.20%
Libertarian	David Awad	741	0.64%
An Inspired Advocate	Brian P. Kulas	729	0.63%
Total votes		115,086	100.0
Democratic hold			

== District 19 ==
=== Democratic primary ===
Democratic primary
Party	Candidate	Votes	%
Democratic	Craig J. Coughlin (incumbent)	7,672	50.2%
Democratic	Yvonne Lopez (incumbent)	7,605	49.8%
Total votes		15,277	100.0%

=== Republican primary ===
Republican primary
Party	Candidate	Votes	%
Republican	Anthony "Tony" Gallo	3,325	51.8%
Republican	Bruce Banko	3,089	48.2%
Total votes		6,414	100.0%

=== General election ===
Predictions

Source	Ranking	As of
New Jersey Globe	Solid D	October 28, 2021
Elections Daily	Safe D	November 1, 2021

Results

19th legislative district general election, 2021
Party	Candidate	Votes	%
Democratic	Craig Coughlin (incumbent)	26,529	29.15%
Democratic	Yvonne Lopez (incumbent)	26,057	28.63%
Republican	Anthony "Tony" Gallo	19,337	21.24%
Republican	Bruce Banko	19,098	20.98%
Total votes		91,021	100.0
Democratic hold			

== District 20 ==
=== Democratic primary ===
Democratic primary
Party	Candidate	Votes	%
Democratic	Annette Quijano (incumbent)	8,785	36.8%
Democratic	Reginald Atkins	8,105	34.0%
Democratic	Diane L. Murray-Clements	3,015	12.6%
Democratic	Christian Veliz	2,778	11.6%
Democratic	Ricky Castaneda (Note: Withdrew, remained on ballot)	615	2.6%
Democratic	Aissa C. Heath	563	2.4%
Total votes		23,861	100.0%

=== Endorsements ===
Reginald Atkins

Labor unions

- SEIU 32BJ (co-endorsed with Quijano)

Organizations

- New Jersey League of Conservation Voters (co-endorsed with Quijano)
Annette Quijano

Labor unions

- SEIU 32BJ (co-endorsed with Atkins)

Organizations

- EMILY's List
- New Jersey League of Conservation Voters (co-endorsed with Quijano)

=== Republican primary ===
No Republicans filed.

Republican primary
Party	Candidate	Votes	%
Republican	Write-in	40	100.0
Total votes		40	100.0

=== General election ===
Predictions

Source	Ranking	As of
New Jersey Globe	Solid D	October 28, 2021
Elections Daily	Safe D	November 1, 2021

Results

20th legislative district general election, 2021
Party	Candidate	Votes	%
Democratic	Annette Quijano (incumbent)	26,276	50.77%
Democratic	Reginald Atkins	25,477	49.23%
Total votes		51,753	100.0
Democratic hold			

== District 21 ==
=== Republican primary ===
Republican primary
Party	Candidate	Votes	%
Republican	Michele Matsikoudis	8,478	43.6%
Republican	Nancy Muñoz (incumbent)	8,302	42.7%
Republican	Jennifer A. Makar	2,652	13.6%
Total votes		19,432	100.0%

=== Democratic primary ===
Democratic primary
Party	Candidate	Votes	%
Democratic	Elizabeth A. Graner	9,763	50.7%
Democratic	Anjali Mehrotra	9,504	49.3%
Total votes		19,267	100.0%

=== General election ===
Predictions

Source	Ranking	As of
New Jersey Globe	Lean R	October 28, 2021
Elections Daily	Lean R	November 1, 2021

Results

21st legislative district general election, 2021
Party	Candidate	Votes	%
Republican	Nancy Muñoz (incumbent)	43,708	26.99%
Republican	Michele Matsikoudis	42,557	26.28%
Democratic	Elizabeth A. Graner	38,207	23.60%
Democratic	Anjali Mehrotra	37,449	23.13%
Total votes		161,921	100.0
Republican hold			

== District 22 ==
=== Democratic primary ===
Democratic primary
Party	Candidate	Votes	%
Democratic	Linda Carter (incumbent)	10,596	51.4%
Democratic	James Kennedy (incumbent)	10,013	48.6%
Total votes		20,609	100.0%

=== Republican primary ===
Republican primary
Party	Candidate	Votes	%
Republican	David Sypher	3,800	50.6%
Republican	Hans Herberg	3,704	49.4%
Total votes		7,504	100.0%

=== General election ===
Predictions

Source	Ranking	As of
New Jersey Globe	Solid D	October 28, 2021
Elections Daily	Safe D	November 1, 2021

Results

22nd legislative district general election, 2021
Party	Candidate	Votes	%
Democratic	Linda Carter (incumbent)	32,267	31.26%
Democratic	James J. Kennedy (incumbent)	31,593	30.60%
Republican	David Sypher	19,825	19.20%
Republican	Hans Herberg	19,546	18.93%
Total votes		103,231	100.0
Democratic hold			

== District 23 ==
=== Republican primary ===
Republican primary
Party	Candidate	Votes	%
Republican	John DiMaio (incumbent)	14,142	50.5%
Republican	Erik Peterson (incumbent)	13,881	49.5%
Total votes		28,023	100.0%

=== Democratic primary ===
Democratic primary
Party	Candidate	Votes	%
Democratic	Hope Kaufman	6,523	50.1%
Democratic	Nicholas F. LaBelle	6,493	49.9%
Total votes		13,016	100.0%

=== General election ===
Predictions

Source	Ranking	As of
New Jersey Globe	Solid R	October 28, 2021
Elections Daily	Safe R	November 1, 2021

Results

23rd legislative district general election, 2021
Party	Candidate	Votes	%
Republican	John DiMaio (incumbent)	46,020	30.71%
Republican	Erik Peterson (incumbent)	44,801	29.90%
Democratic	Hope Kaufman	29,894	19.95%
Democratic	Nicholas F. LaBelle	29,146	19.45%
Total votes		149,861	100.0
Republican hold			

== District 24 ==
=== Republican primary ===
Republican primary
Party	Candidate	Votes	%
Republican	F. Parker Space (incumbent)	16,793	51.5%
Republican	Harold J. "Hal" Wirths (incumbent)	15,808	48.5%
Total votes		32,601	100.0%

=== Democratic primary ===
Democratic primary
Party	Candidate	Votes	%
Democratic	Scott P. Fadden	5,555	89.2%
Democratic	Georgianna Carol Cook (write-in)	488	7.8%
Democratic	Other write-ins	188	3.0%
Total votes		6,231	100.0%

=== General election ===
Predictions

Source	Ranking	As of
New Jersey Globe	Solid R	October 28, 2021
Elections Daily	Safe R	November 1, 2021

Results

24th legislative district general election, 2021
Party	Candidate	Votes	%
Republican	F. Parker Space (incumbent)	51,198	35.60%
Republican	Harold J. "Hal" Wirths (incumbent)	46,966	32.66%
Democratic	Georgianna Carol Cook	23,436	16.29%
Democratic	Scott P. Fadden	22,224	15.45%
Total votes		143,824	100.0
Republican hold			

== District 25 ==
=== Republican primary ===
Republican primary
Party	Candidate	Votes	%
Republican	Brian Bergen (incumbent)	11,995	50.2%
Republican	Aura K. Dunn (incumbent)	11,920	49.8%
Total votes		23,915	100.0%

=== Democratic primary ===
Democratic primary
Party	Candidate	Votes	%
Democratic	Lauren Barnett	8,431	50.6%
Democratic	Patricia L. Veres	8,224	49.4%
Total votes		16,655	100.0%

=== General election ===
Predictions

Source	Ranking	As of
New Jersey Globe	Likely R	October 28, 2021
Elections Daily	Lean R	November 1, 2021

Results

25th legislative district general election, 2021
Party	Candidate	Votes	%
Republican	Aura K. Dunn (incumbent)	42,183	28.25%
Republican	Brian Bergen (incumbent)	41,584	27.85%
Democratic	Lauren Barnett	33,322	22.31%
Democratic	Patricia L. Veres	32,243	21.59%
Total votes		149,332	100.0
Republican hold			

== District 26 ==
=== Republican primary ===
Republican primary
Party	Candidate	Votes	%
Republican	Jay Webber (incumbent)	10,460	34.5%
Republican	Christian E. Barranco	7,220	23.8%
Republican	BettyLou DeCroce (incumbent)	6,669	22.0%
Republican	Thomas Mastrangelo	5,982	19.7%
Total votes		30,331	100.0%

=== Democratic primary ===
Democratic primary
Party	Candidate	Votes	%
Democratic	Melissa Brown Blaeuer	6,960	50.2%
Democratic	Pamela Fadden	6,904	49.8%
Total votes		13,864	100.0%

=== General election ===
Predictions

Source	Ranking	As of
New Jersey Globe	Solid R	October 28, 2021
Elections Daily	Safe R	November 1, 2021

Results

26th legislative district general election, 2021
Party	Candidate	Votes	%
Republican	Jay Webber (incumbent)	46,239	29.98%
Republican	Christian E. Barranco	45,224	29.32%
Democratic	Pamela Fadden	31,434	20.38%
Democratic	Melissa Brown Blaeuer	31,355	20.33%
Total votes		154,252	100.0
Republican hold			

== District 27 ==
=== Democratic primary ===
Democratic primary
Party	Candidate	Votes	%
Democratic	John F. McKeon (incumbent)	11,900	50.2%
Democratic	Mila M. Jasey (incumbent)	11,784	49.8%
Total votes		23,684	100.0%

==== Endorsements ====
Mila Jasey

Organizations

- New Jersey League of Conservation Voters (co-endorsed with McKeon)
John McKeon

Organizations

- New Jersey League of Conservation Voters (co-endorsed with Jasey)

=== Republican primary ===
Republican primary
Party	Candidate	Votes	%
Republican	Kevin Ryan	6,076	50.5%
Republican	Jonathan Sym	5,964	49.5%
Total votes		12,040	100.0%

=== General election ===
Predictions

Source	Ranking	As of
New Jersey Globe	Solid D	October 28, 2021
Elections Daily	Safe D	November 1, 2021

Results

27th legislative district general election, 2021
Party	Candidate	Votes	%
Democratic	John F. McKeon (incumbent)	48,489	31.62%
Democratic	Mila M. Jasey (incumbent)	47,461	30.95%
Republican	Kevin Ryan	28,983	18.90%
Republican	Jonathan Sym	28,419	18.53%
Total votes		153,352	100.0
Democratic hold			

== District 28 ==
=== Democratic primary ===
Democratic primary
Party	Candidate	Votes	%
Democratic	Cleopatra G. Tucker (incumbent)	8,840	51.0%
Democratic	Ralph R. Caputo (incumbent)	8,490	49.0%
Total votes		17,330	100.0%

=== Republican primary ===
Republican primary
Party	Candidate	Votes	%
Republican	Anthony D'Angelo	1,386	51.2%
Republican	Monique Headen	1,320	48.8%
Total votes		2,706	100.0%

=== General election ===
Predictions

Source	Ranking	As of
New Jersey Globe	Solid D	October 28, 2021
Elections Daily	Safe D	November 1, 2021

Results

28th legislative district general election, 2021
Party	Candidate	Votes	%
Democratic	Ralph R. Caputo (incumbent)	32,797	39.24%
Democratic	Cleopatra G. Tucker (incumbent)	32,719	39.15%
Republican	Monique Headen	9,063	10.84%
Republican	Anthony D'Angelo	9,005	10.77%
Total votes		83,584	100.0
Democratic hold			

== District 29 ==
=== Democratic primary ===
Democratic primary
Party	Candidate	Votes	%
Democratic	Shanique Speight (incumbent)	6,005	50.8%
Democratic	Eliana Pintor Marin (incumbent)	5,814	49.2%
Total votes		11,819	100.0%

=== Republican primary ===
No Republicans filed.

Republican primary
Party	Candidate	Votes	%
Republican	Write-in		
Total votes			100.0

=== General election ===
Predictions

Source	Ranking	As of
New Jersey Globe	Solid D	October 28, 2021
Elections Daily	Safe D	November 1, 2021

Results

29th legislative district general election, 2021
Party	Candidate	Votes	%
Democratic	Eliana Pintor Marin (incumbent)	19,919	49.14%
Democratic	Shanique Speight (incumbent)	19,576	48.30%
Salters For All	Debra Salters	1,037	2.56%
Total votes		40,532	100.0
Democratic hold			

== District 30 ==
=== Republican primary ===
Republican primary
Party	Candidate	Votes	%
Republican	Sean T. Kean (incumbent)	9,555	46.6%
Republican	Edward H. Thomson (incumbent)	9,270	45.2%
Republican	Alter Eliezer Richter	1,667	8.1%
Total votes		20,492	100.0%

=== Democratic primary ===
Democratic primary
Party	Candidate	Votes	%
Democratic	Matthew Filosa	4,074	50.2%
Democratic	Stephen Dobbins	4,043	49.8%
Total votes		8,117	100.0%

=== General election ===
Predictions

Source	Ranking	As of
New Jersey Globe	Solid R	October 28, 2021
Elections Daily	Safe R	November 1, 2021

Results

30th legislative district general election, 2021
Party	Candidate	Votes	%
Republican	Sean T. Kean (incumbent)	54,541	36.76%
Republican	Edward H. Thomson (incumbent)	52,678	35.50%
Democratic	Stephen Dobbins	20,800	14.02%
Democratic	Matthew Filosa	20,366	13.73%
Total votes		148,385	100.0
Republican hold			

== District 31 ==
=== Democratic primary ===
Democratic primary
Party	Candidate	Votes	%
Democratic	Angela V. McKnight (incumbent)	7,170	52.2%
Democratic	William Sampson	6,576	47.8%
Total votes		13,746	100.0%

=== Republican primary ===
Republican primary
Party	Candidate	Votes	%
Republican	Rose Javier	959	50.3%
Republican	Brandon Vila	948	49.7%
Total votes		1,907	100.0%

=== General election ===
Predictions

Source	Ranking	As of
New Jersey Globe	Solid D	October 28, 2021
Elections Daily	Safe D	November 1, 2021

Results

31st legislative district general election, 2021
Party	Candidate	Votes	%
Democratic	Angela V. McKnight (incumbent)	26,187	38.30%
Democratic	William Sampson	24,810	36.28%
Republican	Rose Javier	8,817	12.89%
Republican	Brandon Vila	8,565	12.53%
Total votes		68,379	100.0
Democratic hold			

== District 32 ==
=== Democratic primary ===
Democratic primary
Party	Candidate	Votes	%
Democratic	Angelica M. Jimenez (incumbent)	9,387	51.0%
Democratic	Pedro Mejia (incumbent)	9,010	49.0%
Total votes		18,397	100.0%

=== Republican primary ===
Republican primary
Party	Candidate	Votes	%
Republican	Marisela Rodriguez	1,298	50.0%
Republican	Tamara Claudio	1,296	50.0%
Total votes		2,594	100.0%

=== General election ===
Predictions

Source	Ranking	As of
New Jersey Globe	Solid D	October 28, 2021
Elections Daily	Safe D	November 1, 2021

Results

32nd legislative district general election, 2021
Party	Candidate	Votes	%
Democratic	Angelica M. Jimenez (incumbent)	23,250	35.49%
Democratic	Pedro Mejia (incumbent)	22,710	34.67%
Republican	Marisela Rodriguez	9,854	15.04%
Republican	Tamara Claudio	9,689	14.79%
Total votes		65,503	100.0
Democratic hold			

== District 33 ==
=== Democratic primary ===
Democratic primary
Party	Candidate	Votes	%
Democratic	Annette Chaparro (incumbent)	13,554	50.2%
Democratic	Raj Mukherji (incumbent)	13,472	49.8%
Total votes		27,026	100.0%

==== Endorsements ====
Raj Mukherji

Organizations

- New Jersey League of Conservation Voters

=== Republican primary ===
Republican primary
Party	Candidate	Votes	%
Republican	Marcos Marte	1,008	50.3%
Republican	Jacob Curtis	994	49.7%
Total votes		2,002	100.0%

=== General election ===
Predictions

Source	Ranking	As of
New Jersey Globe	Solid D	October 28, 2021
Elections Daily	Safe D	November 1, 2021

Results

33rd legislative district general election, 2021
Party	Candidate	Votes	%
Democratic	Annette Chaparro (incumbent)	33,463	40.86%
Democratic	Raj Mukherji (incumbent)	33,189	40.53%
Republican	Marcos Marte	7,685	9.38%
Republican	Jacob Curtis	7,551	9.22%
Total votes		81,888	100.0
Democratic hold			

== District 34 ==
=== Democratic primary ===
Democratic primary
Party	Candidate	Votes	%
Democratic	Thomas P. Giblin (incumbent)	11,122	50.2%
Democratic	Britnee N. Timberlake (incumbent)	11,023	49.8%
Total votes		22,145	100.0%

==== Endorsements ====
Thomas Giblin

Organizations

- New Jersey League of Conservation Voters
Britnee Timberlake

Organizations

- New Jersey League of Conservation Voters

=== Republican primary ===
Republican primary
Party	Candidate	Votes	%
Republican	Irene DeVita	1,556	50.7%
Republican	Tafari K. Anderson	1,511	49.3%
Total votes		3,067	100.0%

=== General election ===
Predictions

Source	Ranking	As of
New Jersey Globe	Solid D	October 28, 2021
Elections Daily	Safe D	November 1, 2021

Results

34th legislative district general election, 2021
Party	Candidate	Votes	%
Democratic	Thomas P. Giblin (incumbent)	36,717	39.29%
Democratic	Britnee N. Timberlake (incumbent)	36,392	38.94%
Republican	Irene DeVita	10,107	10.82%
Republican	Tafari K. Anderson	9,830	10.52%
Stop The Insanity	Clenard H. Childress Jr.	401	0.43%
Total votes		93,447	100.0
Democratic hold			

== District 35 ==
=== Democratic primary ===
Democratic primary
Party	Candidate	Votes	%
Democratic	Shavonda Sumter (incumbent)	4,454	50.2%
Democratic	Benjie E. Wimberly (incumbent)	4,417	49.8%
Total votes		8,871	100.0%

==== Endorsements ====
Benjie Wimberly

Organizations

- New Jersey League of Conservation Voters

=== Republican primary ===
Republican primary
Party	Candidate	Votes	%
Republican	Ramzy Yamisha	1,433	50.8%
Republican	Iman Majagah	1,389	49.2%
Total votes		2,822	100.0%

=== General election ===
Predictions

Source	Ranking	As of
New Jersey Globe	Solid D	October 28, 2021
Elections Daily	Safe D	November 1, 2021

Results

35th legislative district general election, 2021
Party	Candidate	Votes	%
Democratic	Benjie E. Wimberly (incumbent)	20,276	34.56%
Democratic	Shavonda Sumter (incumbent)	20,235	34.49%
Republican	Ramzy Yamisha	9,166	15.62%
Republican	Iman Majagah	8,990	15.32%
Total votes		58,667	100.0
Democratic hold			

== District 36 ==
=== Democratic primary ===
Democratic primary
Party	Candidate	Votes	%
Democratic	Gary S. Schaer (incumbent)	4,502	50.5%
Democratic	Clinton Calabrese (incumbent)	4,407	49.5%
Total votes		8,909	100.0%

==== Endorsements ====
Clinton Calabrese

Organizations

- New Jersey League of Conservation Voters

=== Republican primary ===
No Republicans filed. However, Craig Auriemma and Joseph Viso Jr. received enough write-in votes to qualify for the general election.

Republican primary
Party	Candidate	Votes	%
Republican	Craig Auriemma (write-in)	113	40.5
Republican	Joseph Viso Jr. (write-in)	112	40.1
Republican	Other write-ins	54	19.4
Total votes		279	100.0

=== General election ===
Predictions

Source	Ranking	As of
New Jersey Globe	Solid D	October 28, 2021
Elections Daily	Safe D	November 1, 2021

Results

36th legislative district general election, 2021
Party	Candidate	Votes	%
Democratic	Gary S. Schaer (incumbent)	24,654	28.40%
Democratic	Clinton Calabrese (incumbent)	24,137	27.80%
Republican	Joseph Viso Jr.	19,025	21.91%
Republican	Craig Auriemma	19,008	21.89%
Total votes		86,824	100.0
Democratic hold			

== District 37 ==
=== Democratic primary ===
Democratic primary
Party	Candidate	Votes	%
Democratic	Ellen J. Park	9,755	36.7%
Democratic	Shama A. Haider	9,502	35.8%
Democratic	Gervonn C. Romney-Rice	3,921	14.8%
Democratic	Lauren M. K. Dayton	3,373	12.7%
Total votes		26,551	100.0%

==== Endorsements ====
Lauren Dayton

Organizations

- Working Families Party (co-endorsed with Romney-Rice)
Shama Haider

State officials

- Phil Murphy, Governor of New Jersey (co-endorsed with Park)
- Sheila Oliver, Lieutenant Governor of New Jersey (co-endorsed with Park)
- Loretta Weinberg, Senate Majority Leader of New Jersey (co-endorsed with Park)

Organizations

- New Jersey League of Conservation Voters (co-endorsed with Park)
Ellen Park

State officials

- Phil Murphy, Governor of New Jersey (co-endorsed with Haider)
- Sheila Oliver, Lieutenant Governor of New Jersey (co-endorsed with Haider)
- Loretta Weinberg, Senate Majority Leader of New Jersey (co-endorsed with Haider)

Organizations

- New Jersey League of Conservation Voters (co-endorsed with Haider)
Gervonn Romney-Rice

Organizations

- Working Families Party (co-endorsed with Dayton)

=== Republican primary ===
Republican primary
Party	Candidate	Votes	%
Republican	Edward P. Durfee Jr.	2,583	50.8%
Republican	Perley V. Patrick	2,497	49.2%
Total votes		5,080	100.0%

=== General election ===
Predictions

Source	Ranking	As of
New Jersey Globe	Solid D	October 28, 2021
Elections Daily	Safe D	November 1, 2021

Results

37th legislative district general election, 2021
Party	Candidate	Votes	%
Democratic	Ellen J. Park	33,532	33.77%
Democratic	Shama A. Haider	32,797	33.03%
Republican	Edward P. Durfee Jr.	16,193	16.31%
Republican	Perley V. Patrick	15,863	15.97%
Children&Seniors First	Natacha M. Pannell	923	0.93%
Total votes		99,308	100.0
Democratic hold			

== District 38 ==
=== Democratic primary ===
Democratic primary
Party	Candidate	Votes	%
Democratic	Lisa Swain (incumbent)	6,515	51.1%
Democratic	Chris Tully (incumbent)	6,225	48.9%
Total votes		12,740	100.0%

=== Republican primary ===
Republican primary
Party	Candidate	Votes	%
Republican	Alfonso Mastrofilipo Jr.	5,401	50.3%
Republican	Gerard "Jerry" Taylor	5,347	49.7%
Total votes		10,748	100.0%

=== General election ===
Predictions

Source	Ranking	As of
New Jersey Globe	Solid D	October 28, 2021
Elections Daily	Safe D	November 1, 2021

Results

38th legislative district general election, 2021
Party	Candidate	Votes	%
Democratic	Lisa Swain (incumbent)	34,226	26.52%
Democratic	Chris Tully (incumbent)	33,444	25.92%
Republican	Alfonso Mastrofilipo Jr.	30,777	23.85%
Republican	Gerard "Jerry" Taylor	30,597	23.71%
Total votes		129,044	100.0
Democratic hold			

== District 39 ==
=== Republican primary ===
Republican primary
Party	Candidate	Votes	%
Republican	Robert Auth (incumbent)	6,622	33.4%
Republican	DeAnne DeFuccio (incumbent)	6,362	32.0%
Republican	John V. Azzariti	3,584	18.1%
Republican	Jonathan Kurpis	3,287	16.6%
Total votes		19,855	100.0%

=== Democratic primary ===
Democratic primary
Party	Candidate	Votes	%
Democratic	Melinda J. Iannuzzi	6,372	51.0%
Democratic	Karlito A. Almeda	6,120	49.0%
Total votes		12,492	100.0%

=== General election ===
Predictions

Source	Ranking	As of
New Jersey Globe	Likely R	October 28, 2021
Elections Daily	Lean R	November 1, 2021

Results

39th legislative district general election, 2021
Party	Candidate	Votes	%
Republican	Robert Auth (incumbent)	44,343	28.29%
Republican	DeAnne DeFuccio (incumbent)	43,791	27.94%
Democratic	Melinda J. Iannuzzi	34,890	22.26%
Democratic	Karlito A. Almeda	33,708	21.51%
Total votes		156,732	100.0
Republican hold			

== District 40 ==
=== Republican primary ===
Republican primary
Party	Candidate	Votes	%
Republican	Kevin J. Rooney (incumbent)	9,560	50.5%
Republican	Christopher P. DePhillips (incumbent)	9,356	49.5%
Total votes		18,916	100.0%

=== Democratic primary ===
Democratic primary
Party	Candidate	Votes	%
Democratic	Nicole McNamara	5,787	50.1%
Democratic	Genevieve Allard	5,759	49.9%
Total votes		11,546	100.0%

=== General election ===
Predictions

Source	Ranking	As of
New Jersey Globe	Solid R	October 28, 2021
Elections Daily	Safe R	November 1, 2021

Results

40th legislative district general election, 2021
Party	Candidate	Votes	%
Republican	Kevin J. Rooney (incumbent)	46,004	30.08%
Republican	Christopher P. DePhillips (incumbent)	45,246	29.59%
Democratic	Nicole McNamara	31,066	20.31%
Democratic	Genevieve Allard	30,606	20.01%
Total votes		152,922	100.0
Republican hold			

== See also ==
- 2021 New Jersey elections
- 2021 New Jersey Senate election
- List of New Jersey state legislatures
