= 2019 New Jersey General Assembly election =

- November 5, 2019

All 80 seats in the New Jersey General Assembly 41 seats needed for a majority
- Turnout: 27% (▼12pp)
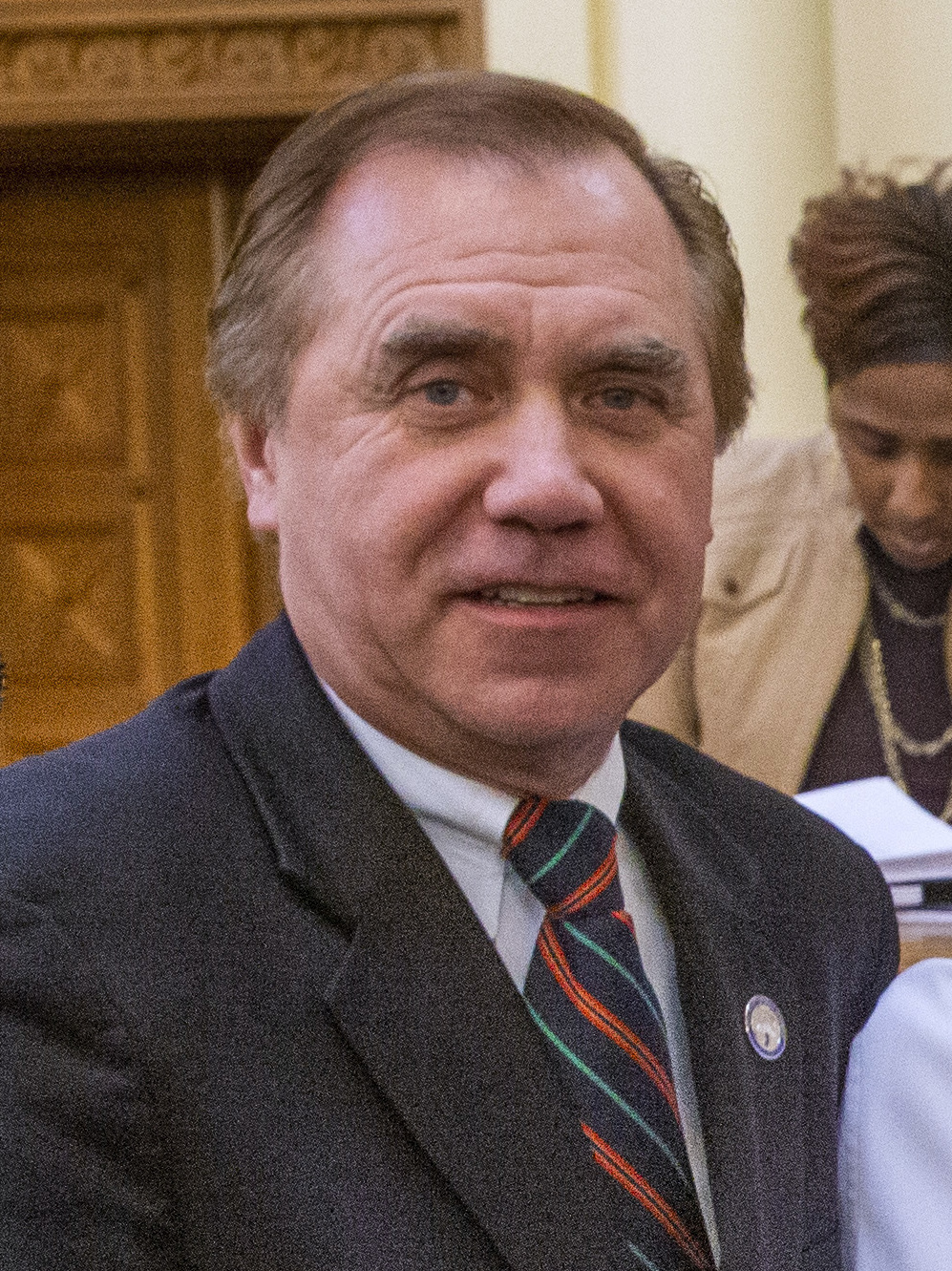

	Majority party	Minority party
Leader	Craig Coughlin	Jon Bramnick
Party	Democratic	Republican
Leader since	January 9, 2018	January 17, 2012
Leader's seat	19th (Woodbridge)	21st (Westfield)
Last election	54	26
Seats won	52	28
Seat change	▼2	▲2
Popular vote	474,160	304,101
Percentage	60.93%	39.07%
Swing	▲2.85%	▼2.28%
- Results: Democratic hold Republican hold Republican gain
Speaker before election
Craig Coughlin
Democratic
Elected Speaker
Craig Coughlin
Democratic

The 2019 Elections for New Jersey's General Assembly was held on November 5, 2019. All 80 seats in the Assembly were up for election. The candidates who won were a part of the 219th New Jersey Legislature.

All 80 seats of the New Jersey General Assembly were up for election. Democrats held a 54–26 supermajority in the lower house prior to the election. The members of the New Jersey Legislature are chosen from 40 electoral districts. Each district elects one state senator and two State Assembly members. New Jersey uses coterminous legislative districts for both its State Senate and General Assembly.

Going into the 2019 election, every legislative district was represented by two Assembly members of the same party. This was maintained afterward, as Republicans flipped both seats in the 1st district and broke the Democratic supermajority.

== Incumbents not running for re-election ==
=== Democratic ===
- Patricia Egan Jones, District 5

=== Republican ===
- Michael Patrick Carroll, District 25 (running for Morris County Surrogate)
- Amy Handlin, District 13
- David W. Wolfe, District 10

== Predictions ==
Source	Ranking	As of
New Jersey Globe	Safe D	November 1, 2019
Sabato	Safe D	October 31, 2019

== Overall results ==
↓
52	28
Democratic	Republican

Results
Parties	Candidates	Seats				Popular Vote		
Parties	Candidates	2017	2019	+/-	Strength	Vote	%	Change
Democratic	97	54	52	▼2	62.50%	474,160	60.93%	▲2.85pp
Republican	82	26	28	▲2	37.50%	304,101	39.07%	▼2.28pp

== Summary of results by district ==
Legislative District	2016 Pres.	Incumbent	Party	Elected Assembly Member	Party
1st	R +8.92	R. Bruce Land	Democrat	Erik Simonsen	Republican
1st	R +8.92	Matthew W. Milam	Democrat	Antwan McClellan	Republican
2nd	D+11.44	Vince Mazzeo	Democrat	Vince Mazzeo	Democrat
2nd	D+11.44	John Armato	Democrat	John Armato	Democrat
3rd	R+3.49	John J. Burzichelli	Democrat	John J. Burzichelli	Democrat
3rd	R+3.49	Adam Taliaferro	Democrat	Adam Taliaferro	Democrat
4th	D+12.43	Paul D. Moriarty	Democrat	Paul D. Moriarty	Democrat
4th	D+12.43	Gabriela Mosquera	Democrat	Gabriela Mosquera	Democrat
5th	D+28.97	William Spearman	Democrat	William Spearman	Democrat
5th	D+28.97	Patricia Egan Jones	Democrat	William F. Moen Jr.	Democrat
6th	D+32.33	Louis Greenwald	Democrat	Louis Greenwald	Democrat
6th	D+32.33	Pamela Rosen Lampitt	Democrat	Pamela Rosen Lampitt	Democrat
7th	D+26.61	Herb Conaway	Democrat	Herb Conaway	Democrat
7th	D+26.61	Carol A. Murphy	Democrat	Carol A. Murphy	Democrat
8th	D+2.34	Ryan Peters	Republican	Ryan Peters	Republican
8th	D+2.34	Joe Howarth	Republican	Jean Stanfield	Republican
9th	R+28.54	Brian E. Rumpf	Republican	Brian E. Rumpf	Republican
9th	R+28.54	DiAnne Gove	Republican	DiAnne Gove	Republican
10th	R+31.21	Gregory P. McGuckin	Republican	Gregory P. McGuckin	Republican
10th	R+31.21	David W. Wolfe	Republican	John Catalano	Republican
11th	D+6.71	Eric Houghtaling	Democrat	Eric Houghtaling	Democrat
11th	D+6.71	Joann Downey	Democrat	Joann Downey	Democrat
12th	R+17.24	Ronald S. Dancer	Republican	Ronald S. Dancer	Republican
12th	R+17.24	Robert D. Clifton	Republican	Robert D. Clifton	Republican
13th	R+13.48	Serena DiMaso	Republican	Serena DiMaso	Republican
13th	R+13.48	Amy Handlin	Republican	Gerard Scharfenberger	Republican
14th	D+11.68	Wayne DeAngelo	Democrat	Wayne DeAngelo	Democrat
14th	D+11.68	Daniel R. Benson	Democrat	Daniel R. Benson	Democrat
15th	D+49.81	Verlina Reynolds-Jackson	Democrat	Verlina Reynolds-Jackson	Democrat
15th	D+49.81	Anthony Verrelli	Democrat	Anthony Verrelli	Democrat
16th	D+14.35	Andrew Zwicker	Democrat	Andrew Zwicker	Democrat
16th	D+14.35	Roy Freiman	Democrat	Roy Freiman	Democrat
17th	D+44.46	Joseph Danielsen	Democrat	Joseph Danielsen	Democrat
17th	D+44.46	Joseph V. Egan	Democrat	Joseph V. Egan	Democrat
18th	D+20.56	Nancy Pinkin	Democrat	Nancy Pinkin	Democrat
18th	D+20.56	Robert Karabinchak	Democrat	Robert Karabinchak	Democrat
19th	D+21.94	Craig Coughlin	Democrat	Craig Coughlin	Democrat
19th	D+21.94	Yvonne Lopez	Democrat	Yvonne Lopez	Democrat
20th	D+56.94	Annette Quijano	Democrat	Annette Quijano	Democrat
20th	D+56.94	Jamel Holley	Democrat	Jamel Holley	Democrat
21st	D+9.49	Jon Bramnick	Republican	Jon Bramnick	Republican
21st	D+9.49	Nancy Munoz	Republican	Nancy Munoz	Republican
22nd	D+32.11	James J. Kennedy	Democrat	James J. Kennedy	Democrat
22nd	D+32.11	Linda S. Carter	Democrat	Linda S. Carter	Democrat
23rd	R+11.95	Erik Peterson	Republican	Erik Peterson	Republican
23rd	R+11.95	John DiMaio	Republican	John DiMaio	Republican
24th	R+28.14	Parker Space	Republican	Parker Space	Republican
24th	R+28.14	Hal Wirths	Republican	Hal Wirths	Republican
25th	D+0.21	Tony Bucco	Republican	Tony Bucco (Note: State Senator since October 2019 and will be replaced in Assembly)	Republican
25th	D+0.21	Michael Patrick Carroll	Republican	Brian Bergen	Republican
26th	R+9.91	BettyLou DeCroce	Republican	BettyLou DeCroce	Republican
26th	R+9.91	Jay Webber	Republican	Jay Webber	Republican
27th	D+28.36	John F. McKeon	Democrat	John F. McKeon	Democrat
27th	D+28.36	Mila Jasey	Democrat	Mila Jasey	Democrat
28th	D+62.18	Cleopatra Tucker	Democrat	Cleopatra Tucker	Democrat
28th	D+62.18	Ralph R. Caputo	Democrat	Ralph R. Caputo	Democrat
29th	D+69	Eliana Pintor Marin	Democrat	Eliana Pintor Marin	Democrat
29th	D+69	Shanique Speight	Democrat	Shanique Speight	Democrat
30th	R+30.61	Sean T. Kean	Republican	Sean T. Kean	Republican
30th	R+30.61	Ned Thomson	Republican	Ned Thomson	Republican
31st	D+55.84	Angela V. McKnight	Democrat	Angela V. McKnight	Democrat
31st	D+55.84	Nicholas Chiaravalloti	Democrat	Nicholas Chiaravalloti	Democrat
32nd	D+41.08	Angelica M. Jimenez	Democrat	Angelica M. Jimenez	Democrat
32nd	D+41.08	Pedro Mejia	Democrat	Pedro Mejia	Democrat
33rd	D+57.65	Raj Mukherji	Democrat	Raj Mukherji	Democrat
33rd	D+57.65	Annette Chaparro	Democrat	Annette Chaparro	Democrat
34th	D+61.59	Thomas P. Giblin	Democrat	Thomas P. Giblin	Democrat
34th	D+61.59	Britnee Timberlake	Democrat	Britnee Timberlake	Democrat
35th	D+55.24	Shavonda E. Sumter	Democrat	Shavonda E. Sumter	Democrat
35th	D+55.24	Benjie E. Wimberly	Democrat	Benjie E. Wimberly	Democrat
36th	D+16.29	Gary Schaer	Democrat	Gary Schaer	Democrat
36th	D+16.29	Clinton Calabrese	Democrat	Clinton Calabrese	Democrat
37th	D+42.36	Gordon M. Johnson	Democrat	Gordon M. Johnson	Democrat
37th	D+42.36	Valerie Huttle	Democrat	Valerie Huttle	Democrat
38th	D+9.36	Lisa Swain	Democrat	Lisa Swain	Democrat
38th	D+9.36	P. Christopher Tully	Democrat	P. Christopher Tully	Democrat
39th	R+4.05	Holly Schepisi	Republican	Holly Schepisi	Republican
39th	R+4.05	Robert Auth	Republican	Robert Auth	Republican
40th	R+7.01	Kevin J. Rooney	Republican	Kevin J. Rooney	Republican
40th	R+7.01	Christopher DePhillips	Republican	Christopher DePhillips	Republican

=== Close races ===
Districts where the difference of total votes between the top-two parties was under 10%:

1. District 8, 1.34%
2. District 2, 3.80%
3. District 21, 5.98%
4. District 25, 6.12%
5. District 11, 6.16%
6. District 1, 6.65% gain
7. District 38, 8.02%
8. District 16, 8.86%
9. District 3, 9.90%

== List of races ==
Voters in each legislative district elect two members to the New Jersey General Assembly.

=== District 1 ===
1st Legislative District General Election, 2019
Party	Candidate	Votes	%
Republican	Erik Simonsen	26,544	27.16%
Republican	Antwan McClellan	25,521	26.12%
Democratic	R. Bruce Land (incumbent)	23,098	23.64%
Democratic	Matthew Milam (incumbent)	22,555	23.08%
Total votes		97,718	100%
Republican gain from Democratic			

==== Predictions ====
Source	Ranking	As of
New Jersey Globe	Tossup	November 1, 2019

=== District 2 ===
2nd Legislative District General Election, 2019
Party	Candidate	Votes	%
Democratic	Vincent Mazzeo (incumbent)	23,211	26.71%
Democratic	John Armato (incumbent)	21,892	25.19%
Republican	John Risley, Jr.	20,906	24.05%
Republican	Philip Guenther	20,905	24.05%
Total votes		86,914	100%
Democratic hold			

==== Predictions ====
Source	Ranking	As of
New Jersey Globe	Likely D	November 1, 2019

=== District 3 ===
3rd Legislative District General Election, 2019
Party	Candidate	Votes	%
Democratic	John Burzichelli (incumbent)	23,327	27.85%
Democratic	Adam Taliaferro (incumbent)	22,693	27.1%
Republican	Beth Sawyer	19,346	23.1%
Republican	Edward Durr	18,386	21.95%
Total votes		83,752	100%
Democratic hold			

==== Predictions ====
Source	Ranking	As of
New Jersey Globe	Safe D	November 1, 2019

=== District 4 ===
4th Legislative District General Election, 2019
Party	Candidate	Votes	%
Democratic	Paul Moriarty (incumbent)	22,347	29.87%
Democratic	Gabriela Mosquera (incumbent)	21,920	29.3%
Republican	Paul Dilks	15,748	21.05%
Republican	Stephen Pakradooni, Jr.	14,806	19.79%
Total votes		74,821	100%
Democratic hold			

==== Predictions ====
Source	Ranking	As of
New Jersey Globe	Safe D	November 1, 2019

=== District 5 ===
5th Legislative District General Election, 2019
Party	Candidate	Votes	%
Democratic	William Spearman (incumbent)	21,533	33.95%
Democratic	William Moen, Jr.	20,743	32.7%
Republican	Nicholas Kush	10,711	16.89%
Republican	Kevin Ehret	10,442	16.46%
Total votes		63,429	100%
Democratic hold			

==== Predictions ====
Source	Ranking	As of
New Jersey Globe	Safe D	November 1, 2019

=== District 6 ===
6th Legislative District General Election, 2019
Party	Candidate	Votes	%
Democratic	Louis Greenwald (incumbent)	30,166	34.7%
Democratic	Pamela Lampitt (incumbent)	29,354	33.77%
Republican	Cynthia Plucinski	13,801	15.88%
Republican	John Papeika	13,612	15.66%
Total votes		86,933	100%

==== Predictions ====
Source	Ranking	As of
New Jersey Globe	Safe D	November 1, 2019

=== District 7 ===
7th Legislative District General Election, 2019
Party	Candidate	Votes	%
Democratic	Carol Murphy (incumbent)	28,735	37.64%
Democratic	Herbert Conaway, Jr. (incumbent)	28,594	37.46%
Republican	Peter Miller	17,348	22.73%
True Blue Unbossed	Kathleen Cooley	1,656	2.17%
Total votes		76,333	100%
Democratic hold			

==== Predictions ====
Source	Ranking	As of
New Jersey Globe	Safe D	November 1, 2019

=== District 8 ===
8th Legislative District General Election, 2019
Party	Candidate	Votes	%
Republican	Jean Stanfield	24,310	25.41%
Republican	Ryan Peters (incumbent)	24,168	25.26%
Democratic	Gina LaPlaca	23,141	24.19%
Democratic	Mark Natale	22,364	23.37%
MAGA Conservative	Tom Giangiulio, Jr.	1,696	1.77%
Total votes		95,679	100%
Republican hold			

==== Predictions ====
Source	Ranking	As of
New Jersey Globe	Tossup	November 1, 2019

=== District 9 ===
9th Legislative District General Election, 2019
Party	Candidate	Votes	%
Republican	Brian Rumpf (incumbent)	35,190	34.8%
Republican	DiAnne Gove (incumbent)	34,462	34.08%
Democratic	Sarah Collins	16,246	16.07%
Democratic	Wayne Lewis	15,211	15.04%
Total votes		101,109	100%
Republican hold			

==== Predictions ====
Source	Ranking	As of
New Jersey Globe	Safe R	November 1, 2019

=== District 10 ===
10th Legislative District General Election, 2019
Party	Candidate	Votes	%
Republican	Gregory McGuckin (incumbent)	31,212	31.48%
Republican	John Catalano	30,345	30.6%
Democratic	Eileen Della Volle	18,224	18.38%
Democratic	Erin Wheeler	17,899	18.05%
Integrity Experience Leadership	Vincent Barrella	818	0.83%
Addressing Systemic Issues	Ian Holmes	653	0.66%
Total votes		99,151	100%
Republican hold			

==== Predictions ====
Source	Ranking	As of
New Jersey Globe	Safe R	November 1, 2019

=== District 11 ===
11th Legislative District General Election, 2019
Party	Candidate	Votes	%
Democratic	Joann Downey (incumbent)	22,482	26.58%
Democratic	Eric Houghtaling (incumbent)	22,415	26.5%
Republican	Michael Amoroso	20,171	23.84%
Republican	Matthew Woolley	19,525	23.08%
Total votes		84,593	100%
Democratic hold			

==== Predictions ====
Source	Ranking	As of
New Jersey Globe	Safe D	November 1, 2019

=== District 12 ===
12th Legislative District General Election, 2019
Party	Candidate	Votes	%
Republican	Ronald Dancer (incumbent)	23,866	32.19%
Republican	Robert Clifton (incumbent)	23,173	31.25%
Democratic	David Lande	13,909	18.76%
Democratic	Malini Guha	13,194	17.8%
Total votes		74,142	100%
Republican hold			

==== Predictions ====
Source	Ranking	As of
New Jersey Globe	Safe R	November 1, 2019

=== District 13 ===
13th Legislative District General Election, 2019
Party	Candidate	Votes	%
Republican	Gerard Scharfenberger	25,155	29.87%
Republican	Serena DiMaso (incumbent)	24,649	29.27%
Democratic	Barbara Singer	17,240	20.47%
Democratic	Allison Friedman	17,181	20.4%
Total votes		84,225	100%
Republican hold			

==== Predictions ====
Source	Ranking	As of
New Jersey Globe	Safe R	November 1, 2019

=== District 14 ===
14th Legislative District General Election, 2019
Party	Candidate	Votes	%
Democratic	Wayne DeAngelo (incumbent)	29,734	30.32%
Democratic	Daniel Benson (incumbent)	29,012	29.59%
Republican	Thomas Calabrese	19,791	20.18%
Republican	Bina Shah	18,024	18.38%
Integrity And Accountability	Michael Bollentin	1,500	1.53%
Total votes		98,061	100%
Democratic hold			

==== Predictions ====
Source	Ranking	As of
New Jersey Globe	Safe D	November 1, 2019

=== District 15 ===
15th Legislative District General Election, 2019
Party	Candidate	Votes	%
Democratic	Verlina Reynolds-Jackson (incumbent)	22,742	39.01%
Democratic	Anthony Verrelli (incumbent)	22,141	37.98%
Republican	Jennifer Williams	9,426	16.17%
Legalize Marijuana Party	Edward Forchion	2,447	4.2%
Legalize Marijuana Party	Dioh Williams	1,541	2.64%
Total votes		58,297	100%
Democratic hold			

==== Predictions ====
Source	Ranking	As of
New Jersey Globe	Safe D	November 1, 2019

=== District 16 ===
16th Legislative District General Election, 2019
Party	Candidate	Votes	%
Democratic	Andrew Zwicker (incumbent)	26,280	27.85%
Democratic	Roy Freiman (incumbent)	25,077	26.58%
Republican	Mark Caliguire	21,606	22.9%
Republican	Christine Madrid	21,387	22.67%
Total votes		94,350	100%
Democratic hold			

==== Predictions ====
Source	Ranking	As of
New Jersey Globe	Lean D	November 1, 2019

=== District 17 ===
17th Legislative District General Election, 2019
Party	Candidate	Votes	%
Democratic	Joseph Egan (incumbent)	20,272	36.47%
Democratic	Joseph Danielsen (incumbent)	20,108	36.18%
Republican	Patricia Badovinac	7,612	13.69%
Republican	Maria Conception Powell	7,592	13.66%
Total votes		55,584	100%
Democratic hold			

==== Predictions ====
Source	Ranking	As of
New Jersey Globe	Safe D	November 1, 2019

=== District 18 ===
18th Legislative District General Election, 2019
Party	Candidate	Votes	%
Democratic	Nancy Pinkin (incumbent)	19,431	30.6%
Democratic	Robert Karabinchak (incumbent)	18,727	29.49%
Republican	Robert Bengivenga	13,002	20.47%
Republican	Jeffrey Brown	12,349	19.44%
Total votes		63,509	100%
Democratic hold			

==== Predictions ====
Source	Ranking	As of
New Jersey Globe	Safe D	November 1, 2019

=== District 19 ===
19th Legislative District General Election, 2019
Party	Candidate	Votes	%
Democratic	Craig Coughlin (incumbent)	17,878	33.52%
Democratic	Yvonne Lopez (incumbent)	17,039	31.95%
Republican	Rocco Genova	9,046	16.96%
Republican	Christian Onuoha	8,705	16.32%
Independent	William Cruz	661	1.24%
Total votes		53,329	100%
Democratic hold			

==== Predictions ====
Source	Ranking	As of
New Jersey Globe	Safe D	November 1, 2019

=== District 20 ===
20th Legislative District General Election, 2019
Party	Candidate	Votes	%
Democratic	Annette Quijano (incumbent)	13,173	40.75%
Democratic	Jamel Holley (incumbent)	12,437	38.48%
Republican	Charles Donnelly	3,496	10.82%
Republican	Ashraf Hanna	3,218	9.96%
Total votes		32,324	100%
Democratic hold			

==== Predictions ====
Source	Ranking	As of
New Jersey Globe	Safe D	November 1, 2019

=== District 21 ===
21st Legislative District General Election, 2019
Party	Candidate	Votes	%
Republican	Jon Bramnick (incumbent)	28,787	26.31%
Republican	Nancy Munoz (incumbent)	28,079	25.66%
Democratic	Lisa Mandelblatt	25,452	23.26%
Democratic	Stacey Gunderman	24,865	22.73%
Conservative	Martin Marks	1,147	1.05%
Conservative	Harris Pappas	1,081	0.99%
Total votes		109,411	100%
Republican hold			

==== Predictions ====
Source	Ranking	As of
New Jersey Globe	Tossup	November 1, 2019

=== District 22 ===
22nd Legislative District General Election, 2019
Party	Candidate	Votes	%
Democratic	Linda Carter (incumbent)	18,703	40.25%
Democratic	James Kennedy (incumbent)	18,099	38.95%
Republican	Patricia Quattrocchi	9,665	20.8%
Total votes		46,467	100%
Democratic hold			

==== Predictions ====
Source	Ranking	As of
New Jersey Globe	Safe D	November 1, 2019

=== District 23 ===
23rd Legislative District General Election, 2019
Party	Candidate	Votes	%
Republican	John DiMaio (incumbent)	27,887	30.41%
Republican	Erik Peterson (incumbent)	27,758	30.27%
Democratic	Denise King	18,093	19.73%
Democratic	Marisa Trofimov	17,969	19.59%
Total votes		91,707	100%
Republican hold			

==== Predictions ====
Source	Ranking	As of
New Jersey Globe	Safe R	November 1, 2019

=== District 24 ===
24th Legislative District General Election, 2019
Party	Candidate	Votes	%
Republican	Parker Space (incumbent)	30,380	34.78%
Republican	Harold Wirths (incumbent)	28,953	33.15%
Democratic	Deana Lykins	14,704	16.83%
Democratic	Dan Soloman Smith	13,313	15.24%
Total votes		87,350	100%
Republican hold			

==== Predictions ====
Source	Ranking	As of
New Jersey Globe	Safe R	November 1, 2019

=== District 25 ===
25th Legislative District General Election, 2019
Party	Candidate	Votes	%
Republican	Anthony Bucco, Jr. (incumbent)	26,848	27.19%
Republican	Brian Bergen	25,552	25.87%
Democratic	Lisa Bhimani	23,505	23.8%
Democratic	Darcy Draeger	22,850	23.14%
Total votes		98,755	100%
Republican hold			

==== Predictions ====
Source	Ranking	As of
New Jersey Globe	Tossup	November 1, 2019

=== District 26 ===
26th Legislative District General Election, 2019
Party	Candidate	Votes	%
Republican	BettyLou DeCroce (incumbent)	24,706	28.5%
Republican	Jay Webber (incumbent)	24,451	28.21%
Democratic	Christine Clarke	18,813	21.7%
Democratic	Laura Fortgang	18,711	21.59%
Total votes		86,681	100%
Republican hold			

==== Predictions ====
Source	Ranking	As of
New Jersey Globe	Safe R	November 1, 2019

=== District 27 ===
27th Legislative District General Election, 2019
Party	Candidate	Votes	%
Democratic	John McKeon (incumbent)	26,062	32.6%
Democratic	Mila Jasey (incumbent)	25,282	31.63%
Republican	Michael Dailey	14,353	17.96%
Republican	Mauro Tucci	14,236	17.81%
Total votes		79,933	100%
Democratic hold			

==== Predictions ====
Source	Ranking	As of
New Jersey Globe	Safe D	November 1, 2019

=== District 28 ===
28th Legislative District General Election, 2019
Party	Candidate	Votes	%
Democratic	Ralph Caputo (incumbent)	15,396	41.29%
Democratic	Cleopatra Tucker (incumbent)	15,163	40.67%
Republican	Joy Bembry-Freeman	3,181	8.53%
Republican	Antonio Pires	2,946	7.9%
Independent	Derrick Ross	598	1.6%
Total votes		37,284	100%
Democratic hold			

==== Predictions ====
Source	Ranking	As of
New Jersey Globe	Safe D	November 1, 2019

=== District 29 ===
29th Legislative District General Election, 2019
Party	Candidate	Votes	%
Democratic	Eliana Pintor Marin (incumbent)	7,957	40.73%
Democratic	Shanique Speight (incumbent)	7,652	39.17%
Republican	John Anello	1,545	7.91%
Republican	Jeannette Veras	1,399	7.16%
Jobs, Equal Rights	Yolanda Johnson	529	2.71%
Jobs, Equal Rights	Nichelle Velazquez	455	2.33%
Total votes		19,537	100%
Democratic hold			

==== Predictions ====
Source	Ranking	As of
New Jersey Globe	Safe D	November 1, 2019

=== District 30 ===
30th Legislative District General Election, 2019
Party	Candidate	Votes	%
Republican	Sean Kean (incumbent)	24,810	36.35%
Republican	Edward Thomson (incumbent)	23,078	33.82%
Democratic	Steven Farkas	9,781	14.33%
Democratic	Jason Celik	9,391	13.76%
The Other Candidate	Hank Schroeder	1,186	1.74%
Total votes		68,246	100%
Republican hold			

==== Predictions ====
Source	Ranking	As of
New Jersey Globe	Safe R	November 1, 2019

=== District 31 ===
31st Legislative District General Election, 2019
Party	Candidate	Votes	%
Democratic	Angela McKnight (incumbent)	18,432	43.22%
Democratic	Nicholas Chiaravalloti (incumbent)	16,750	39.27%
Republican	Jason Mushnick	3,792	8.89%
Republican	Mary Kay Palange	3,674	8.61%
Total votes		33,893	100%
Democratic hold			

==== Predictions ====
Source	Ranking	As of
New Jersey Globe	Safe D	November 1, 2019

=== District 32 ===
32nd Legislative District General Election, 2019
Party	Candidate	Votes	%
Democratic	Angelica Jimenez (incumbent)	13,974	40.48%
Democratic	Pedro Mejia (incumbent)	13,485	39.06%
Republican	Ann Carletta	3,551	10.29%
Republican	Francesca Curreli	3,514	10.18%
Total votes		29,548	100%
Democratic hold			

==== Predictions ====
Source	Ranking	As of
New Jersey Globe	Safe D	November 1, 2019

=== District 33 ===
33rd Legislative District General Election, 2019
Party	Candidate	Votes	%
Democratic	Raj Mukherji (incumbent)	23,644	42.41%
Democratic	Annette Chaparro (incumbent)	23,572	42.28%
Republican	Holly Lucyk	4,462	8%
Republican	Fabian Rohena	4,075	7.31%
Total votes		49,855	100%
Democratic hold			

==== Predictions ====
Source	Ranking	As of
New Jersey Globe	Safe D	November 1, 2019

=== District 34 ===
34th Legislative District General Election, 2019
Party	Candidate	Votes	%
Democratic	Thomas Giblin (incumbent)	17,849	41.62%
Democratic	Britnee Timberlake (incumbent)	17,441	40.66%
Republican	Bharat Rana	3,527	8.22%
Republican	Irene DeVita	3,453	8.05%
Stop The Insanity!	Clenard Childress, Jr.	620	1.45%
Total votes		42,319	100%
Democratic hold			

==== Predictions ====
Source	Ranking	As of
New Jersey Globe	Safe D	November 1, 2019

=== District 35 ===
35th Legislative District General Election, 2019
Party	Candidate	Votes	%
Democratic	Benjie Wimberly (incumbent)	13,213	43.61%
Democratic	Shavonda Sumter (incumbent)	13,173	43.48%
Republican	Tamer Mamkej	3,909	12.9%
Total votes		30,295	100%

==== Predictions ====
Source	Ranking	As of
New Jersey Globe	Safe D	November 1, 2019

=== District 36 ===
36th Legislative District General Election, 2019
Party	Candidate	Votes	%
Democratic	Gary Schaer (incumbent)	14,990	30.86%
Democratic	Clinton Calabrese (incumbent)	14,901	30.68%
Republican	Foster Lowe	9,350	19.25%
Republican	Khaldoun Androwis	9,336	19.22%
Total votes		47,346	100%
Democratic hold			

==== Predictions ====
Source	Ranking	As of
New Jersey Globe	Safe D	November 1, 2019

=== District 37 ===
37th Legislative District General Election, 2019
Party	Candidate	Votes	%
Democratic	Gordon Johnson (incumbent)	19,602	36.05%
Democratic	Valerie Vainieri Huttle (incumbent)	19,475	35.81%
Republican	Angela Hendricks	7,484	13.76%
Republican	Gino Tessaro	7,333	13.48%
Libertarian	Claudio Belusic	485	0.89%
Total votes		54,090	100%
Democratic hold			

==== Predictions ====
Source	Ranking	As of
New Jersey Globe	Safe D	November 1, 2019

=== District 38 ===
38th Legislative District General Election, 2019
Party	Candidate	Votes	%
Democratic	Lisa Swain (incumbent)	19,887	27.22%
Democratic	P. Christopher Tully (incumbent)	19,571	26.79%
Republican	Christopher DiPiazza	16,872	23.1%
Republican	Michael Kazimir	16,724	22.89%
Total votes		72,851	100%
Democratic hold			

==== Predictions ====
Source	Ranking	As of
New Jersey Globe	Safe D	November 1, 2019

=== District 39 ===
39th Legislative District General Election, 2019
Party	Candidate	Votes	%
Republican	Holly Schepisi (incumbent)	27,125	28.54%
Republican	Robert Auth (incumbent)	25,494	26.82%
Democratic	John Birkner	21,434	22.55%
Democratic	Gerald Falotico	20,989	22.08%
Total votes		95,042	100%
Republican hold			

==== Predictions ====
Source	Ranking	As of
New Jersey Globe	Likely R	November 1, 2019

=== District 40 ===
40th Legislative District General Election, 2019
Party	Candidate	Votes	%
Republican	Kevin Rooney (incumbent)	21,117	28.82%
Republican	Christopher DePhillips (incumbent)	20,576	28.08%
Democratic	Julie O'Brien	15,872	21.66%
Democratic	Maria Martini Cordonnier	15,706	21.44%
Total votes		73,271	100%
Republican hold			

==== Predictions ====
Source	Ranking	As of
New Jersey Globe	Safe R	November 1, 2019

== See also ==
- 2019 United States elections
- 2019 New Jersey elections
