= Marilyn Piperno =

Member of the New Jersey General Assembly

Member of the New Jersey General Assembly from the 11th district
- In office January 11, 2022 – January 9, 2024 Serving with Kimberly Eulner
- Preceded by: Joann Downey; Eric Houghtaling
- Succeeded by: Margie Donlon

Personal details
- Born: December 9, 1965 (age 60)
- Party: Republican
- Education: Pace University
- Website: Legislative webpage

Marilyn Piperno (born December 9, 1965) is an American politician and member of the Republican Party. She represented the 11th Legislative District of New Jersey in the New Jersey General Assembly from January 11, 2022, to January 9, 2024. She and her running mate Kimberly Eulner lost in their bid for re-election in November 2023.

== Early life and education ==
Piperno graduated from Pace University and has been a resident of Colts Neck Township.

== Elective office ==
In the 2021 New Jersey General Assembly election, Piperno and her running mate Kimberly Eulner, defeated Democratic incumbents Joann Downey and Eric Houghtaling, both of whom had served three terms in office.

Piperno was one of a record seven new Republican Assemblywomen elected in the 2021 general election, joining seven Republican women incumbents who won re-election that year to the Assembly and Senate.

Led by Senator Vin Gopal, the Democratic Party slate of Margie Donlon and Luanne Peterpaul defeated Piperno and Eulner in their re-election bid in the 2023 New Jersey General Assembly election.

== District 11 ==
Each of the 40 districts in the New Jersey Legislature has one representative in the New Jersey Senate and two members in the New Jersey General Assembly. The other representatives from the 11th District for the 2022—2023 Legislative Session are:

- Senator Vin Gopal (D)
- Assemblywoman Kimberly Eulner (R)

== Electoral history ==
11th legislative district general election, 2021
Party	Candidate	Votes	%
Republican	Marilyn Piperno	35,336	25.05%
Republican	Kimberly Eulner	35,177	24.94%
Democratic	Joann Downey (incumbent)	34,830	24.69%
Democratic	Eric Houghtaling (incumbent)	34,555	24.50%
Green	Dominique Faison	1,152	0.82%
Total votes		141,050	100.0
Republican gain from Democratic			

11th Legislative District General Election, 2023
Party	Candidate	Votes	%
Democratic	Margie Donlon	32,005	28.6
Democratic	Luanne Peterpaul	31,636	28.3
Republican	Marilyn Piperno (incumbent)	24,230	21.7
Republican	Kimberly Eulner (incumbent)	24,025	21.5
Total votes		111,896	100.0
Democratic gain from Republican			
Democratic gain from Republican			
