= Margie Donlon =

American politician and lawyer

Member of the New Jersey General Assembly from the 11th district
- Incumbent
- Assumed office January 9, 2024 Serving with Luanne Peterpaul
- Preceded by: Marilyn Piperno; Kimberly Eulner

Personal details
- Party: Democratic
- Website: Legislative webpage

Margie Donlon is an American Democratic Party politician serving as a member of the New Jersey General Assembly for the 11th legislative district since taking office on January 9, 2024.

== Biography ==
Donlon is a physician, who attended Middlebury College (BA), Yale University (MPH) and earned her medical degree at the University of Rochester School of Medicine. She took office on the Township Council of Ocean Township, Monmouth County, New Jersey, in July 2019.

== Elective office ==
Led by running mate Vin Gopal in the New Jersey Senate, Democrats Donlon and Luanne Peterpaul defeated Republican incumbents Marilyn Piperno and Kimberly Eulner in the 2023 New Jersey General Assembly election to represent the 11th legislative district.

=== District 11 ===
Each of the 40 districts in the New Jersey Legislature has one representative in the New Jersey Senate and two members in the New Jersey General Assembly. The representatives from the 11th District for the 2024—2025 Legislative Session are:

- Senator Vin Gopal (D)
- Assemblywoman Margie Donlon (D)
- Assemblywoman Luanne Peterpaul (D)

== Electoral history ==
11th Legislative District General Election, 2023
Party	Candidate	Votes	%
Democratic	Margie Donlon	32,005	28.6
Democratic	Luanne Peterpaul	31,636	28.3
Republican	Marilyn Piperno (incumbent)	24,230	21.7
Republican	Kimberly Eulner (incumbent)	24,025	21.5
Total votes		111,896	100.0
Democratic gain from Republican			
Democratic gain from Republican			
