= Luanne Peterpaul =

American politician and lawyer

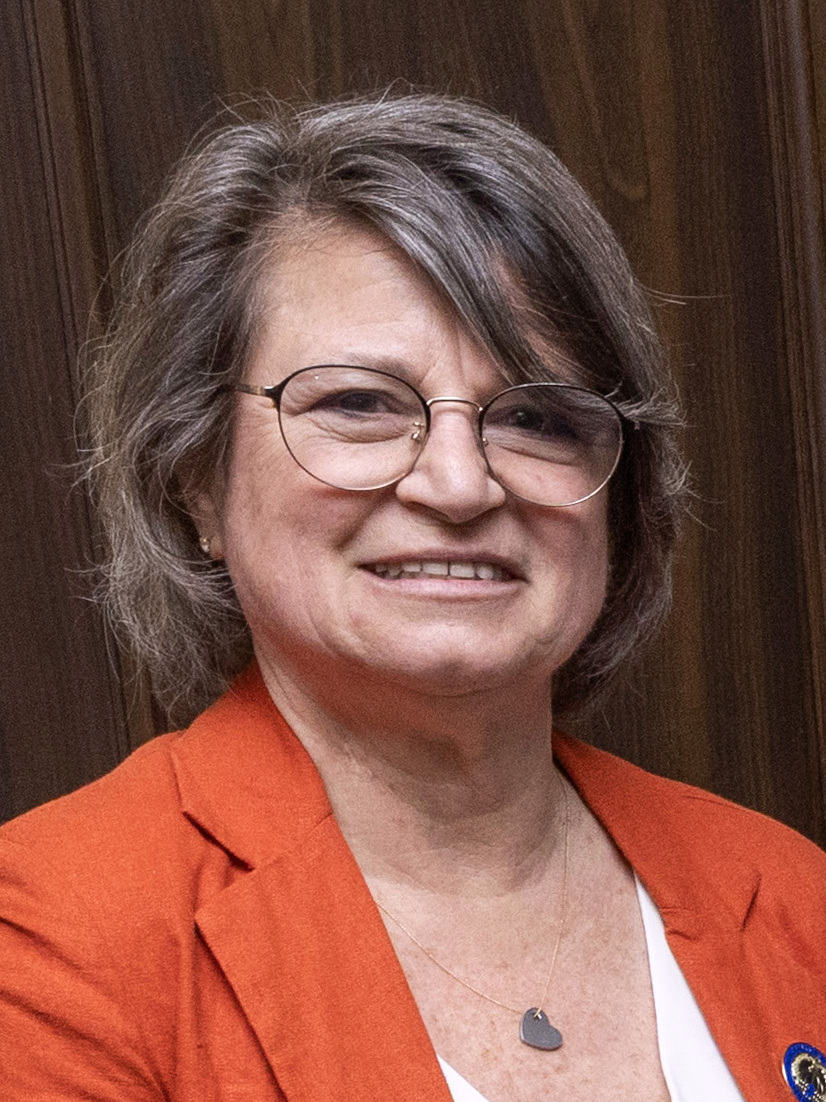
- Peterpaul in 2026

Member of the New Jersey General Assembly from the 11th district
- Incumbent
- Assumed office January 9, 2024 Serving with Margie Donlon
- Preceded by: Marilyn Piperno; Kimberly Eulner

Personal details
- Party: Democratic
- Website: Legislative webpage

Luanne M. Peterpaul is an American politician, lawyer, and former judge. A member of the Democratic Party, she has served as a member of the New Jersey General Assembly for the 11th legislative district, centered in Monmouth County, since January 9, 2024. She is the first out lesbian in the New Jersey legislature.

== Early life and career ==
Peterpaul served as a board chair of Garden State Equality for 12 years. She helped establish same-sex marriage in New Jersey. In 2011, she co-authored the New Jersey Anti-Bullying Bill of Rights that was signed into law by governor Chris Christie. Peterpaul was an assistant county prosecutor in Essex County and a conflict municipal judge in Asbury Park. In 2018, she was nominated by Mayor John Pallone to serve a three-year term as the municipal court judge of Long Branch.

== Elected office ==
Led by running mate Vin Gopal in the New Jersey Senate, Democrats Margie Donlon and Peterpaul defeated Republican incumbents Marilyn Piperno and Kimberly Eulner in the 2023 New Jersey General Assembly election to represent the 11th legislative district.

=== District 11 ===
Each of the 40 districts in the New Jersey Legislature has one representative in the New Jersey Senate and two members in the New Jersey General Assembly. The representatives from the 11th District for the 2024—2025 Legislative Session are:

- Senator Vin Gopal (D)
- Assemblywoman Margie Donlon (D)
- Assemblywoman Luanne Peterpaul (D)

== Electoral history ==
11th Legislative District General Election, 2023
Party	Candidate	Votes	%
Democratic	Margie Donlon	32,005	28.6
Democratic	Luanne Peterpaul	31,636	28.3
Republican	Marilyn Piperno (incumbent)	24,230	21.7
Republican	Kimberly Eulner (incumbent)	24,025	21.5
Total votes		111,896	100.0
Democratic gain from Republican			
Democratic gain from Republican			
