= Kimberly Eulner =

American politician (born 1966)

Mayor of Shrewsbury Borough
- Incumbent
- Assumed office January 9, 2024
- Preceded by: Erik Anderson

Member of the New Jersey General Assembly from the 11th district
- In office January 11, 2022 – January 9, 2024 Serving with Marilyn Piperno
- Preceded by: Joann Downey; Eric Houghtaling
- Succeeded by: Margie Donlon; Luanne Peterpaul

Personal details
- Born: April 15, 1966 (age 60)
- Party: Republican
- Education: Washington College
- Website: Legislative webpage

Kimberly Doran Eulner (born April 15, 1966) is an American Republican Party politician who represented the 11th Legislative district in the New Jersey General Assembly from January 11, 2022, to January 9, 2024. She is currently the mayor of Shrewsbury Borough.

== Early life and education ==
A longtime resident of Shrewsbury, she graduated from Red Bank Regional High School. She attended Washington College in Chestertown, Maryland, graduating in 1988 with a degree in sociology. She served on the Shrewsbury Borough Council.

== Elected office ==
In the 2021 New Jersey General Assembly election, Eulner and her running mate Marilyn Piperno knocked off Democratic incumbents Joann Downey and Eric Houghtaling, both of whom had served three terms in office. Eulner was one of a record seven new Republican Assemblywomen elected in the 2022 general election, joining seven Republican women incumbents who won re-election that year to the Assembly and Senate. In 2023, Eulner and Piperno lost re-election to Democratic challengers Margie Donlon and Luanne Peterpaul.

Shortly after losing re-election to the General Assembly, Eulner was selected to fill a vacancy for Mayor of Shrewsbury after the incumbent, Erik Anderson, resigned after being elected to the Monmouth County Board of County Commissioners. Eulner was sworn in as Mayor on January 9, 2024, the day her Assembly term expired.

== Electoral history ==
11th legislative district general election, 2021
Party	Candidate	Votes	%
Republican	Marilyn Piperno	35,336	25.05%
Republican	Kimberly Eulner	35,177	24.94%
Democratic	Joann Downey (incumbent)	34,830	24.69%
Democratic	Eric Houghtaling (incumbent)	34,555	24.50%
Green	Dominique Faison	1,152	0.82%
Total votes		141,050	100.0
Republican gain from Democratic			

11th Legislative District General Election, 2023
Party	Candidate	Votes	%
Democratic	Margie Donlon	32,005	28.6
Democratic	Luanne Peterpaul	31,636	28.3
Republican	Marilyn Piperno (incumbent)	24,230	21.7
Republican	Kimberly Eulner (incumbent)	24,025	21.5
Total votes		111,896	100.0
Democratic gain from Republican			
Democratic gain from Republican			
