= Mary Pat Angelini =

American Republican Party politician

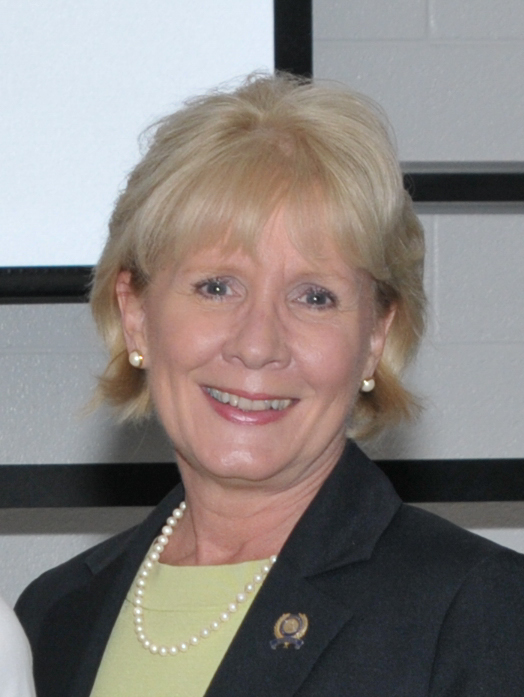
- Angelini in 2015

Member of the New Jersey General Assembly from the 11th district
- In office January 8, 2008 – January 12, 2016
- Preceded by: Steve Corodemus; Sean T. Kean
- Succeeded by: Joann Downey; Eric Houghtaling

Personal details
- Born: December 8, 1954 (age 71)
- Party: Republican
- Spouse: Robert Angelini
- Children: 2
- Education: East Tennessee State University (BSW); Fairleigh Dickinson University (MPA)

Mary Pat Angelini (born December 8, 1954) is an American Republican Party politician who served in the New Jersey General Assembly for the 11th legislative district from 2008 to 2016.

== Education ==
Angelini graduated with a Bachelor of Social Work degree from East Tennessee State University and an M.P.A. from Fairleigh Dickinson University.

== Career ==
Since 1992, she has served as executive director of Prevention First, which urged that educational programs and services to schools, businesses, and community organizations counter what she characterized as the negative effects of drug abuse and violence. Her work there led her to become an advocate against the legalization of recreational marijuana in the State.

Angelini sponsored legislation to establish an Anti-Bullying Bill of Rights in New Jersey. The bill was signed by New Jersey Governor Chris Christie early in 2011. The law encourages school districts to better investigate reports of bullying and was drafted in response to the suicide of Tyler Clementi.

Angelini and running mate Caroline Casagrande were defeated in their 2015 re-election bid to Democratic challengers Joann Downey and Eric Houghtaling.

In October 2022, Angelini was appointed to serve on the board of trustees of Brookdale Community College. She joined Mercury Public Affairs in January 2023 and was appointed by Governor Phil Murphy to the Council on Local Mandates in June 2023.

== Personal life ==
Angelini is a resident of [Wall Township, Monmouth County, New Jersey], Monmouth County.

New Jersey General Assembly
Preceded by Steve Corodemus; Sean T. Kean	Member of the New Jersey General Assembly for the 11th District; January 8, 2008 – January 12, 2016; With: Dave Rible, Caroline Casagrande	Succeeded by Joann Downey; Eric Houghtaling
