= Serena DiMaso =

American politician (born 1963)

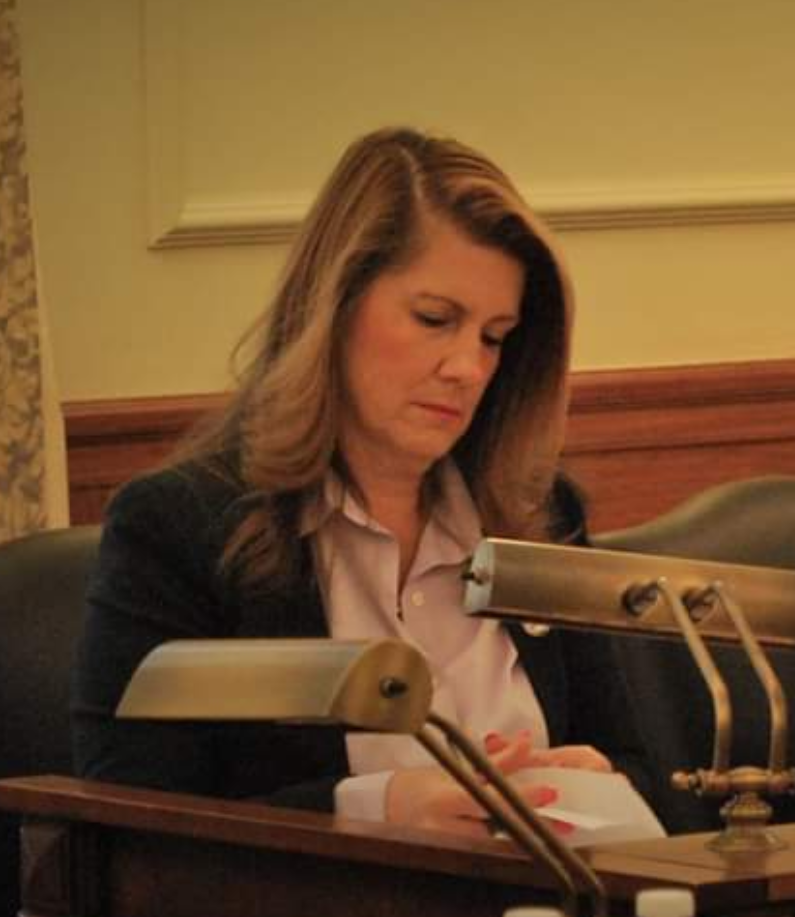

Member of the New Jersey General Assembly from the 13th district
- In office January 9, 2018 – January 11, 2022 Serving with Gerard Scharfenberger
- Preceded by: Declan O'Scanlon
- Succeeded by: Vicky Flynn

Member of the Monmouth County Board of Chosen Freeholders
- In office January 14, 2012 – January 9, 2018
- Preceded by: Robert D. Clifton
- Succeeded by: Gerard Scharfenberger

Personal details
- Born: May 17, 1963 (age 63)
- Party: Republican
- Spouse: Gerald DiMaso
- Children: 4
- Education: St. John's University (BA, JD)
- Website: www.njleg.state.nj.us/members/BIO.asp?Leg=399

Serena DiMaso (born May 17, 1963) is an American Republican Party politician who represented the 13th Legislative District in the New Jersey General Assembly from 2018 to 2022. She replaced Declan O'Scanlon, who ran successfully for a seat in the New Jersey Senate. DiMaso had previously served on the Monmouth County Board of Chosen Freeholders and as mayor of Holmdel Township. In June 2021, DiMaso lost the Republican Primary to Holmdel Board of Education President Vicky Flynn. DiMaso left office in January 2022.

== Early life ==
Raised in Staten Island as the oldest of three sisters, DiMaso graduated from St. John's University, earning a Bachelor of Science degree with a major in management, and was awarded a juris doctor degree from St. John's University School of Law in 1987. She moved to Holmdel with her family in 1993. DiMaso graduated in 2004 from the Christine Todd Whitman Excellence in Public Service Series, a program designed to foster public service by women. From 2002 to 2012, DiMaso served on the Holmdel Township Committee and was chosen by her peers to serve as the township's mayor from 2006 to 2010. She served on the Monmouth County Board of Chosen Freeholders from 2012 to 2018. On the Holmdel Township Committee, DiMaso was an advocate for open space preservation and shared services, serving as a representative on the township's planning board, as chair of the Public Safety and Administration committee and co-chair of the Public Works committee.

== Monmouth County Freeholder ==
DiMaso first took office as a Monmouth County Freeholder on January 14, 2012, when she was appointed to fill the seat vacated by Robert D. Clifton when he took office in the General Assembly. She was elected to full three-year terms in 2013 and 2016, and was chosen by her peers to serve as the board's deputy director for three one-year terms. As a freeholder through 2016, DiMaso received healthcare benefits from the county, paying $66,000 for four years of coverage, despite a policy that had been established by the county that prohibited officials from receiving coverage unless they were full-time employees; she was the only freeholder to have received health benefits from the county. She was elected to her first full term in 2013 together with Arnone (with nearly 31% and 32% of the vote, respectively), defeating Democrats Brian Froelich and Larry Luttell. In a tighter race in 2016, DiMaso (with 150,454 votes and 26.73% of all votes cast) and Arnone (156,154; 27.75%) were re-elected as part of the Republican sweep of countywide elected offices, defeating Democratic challengers Matt Doherty (128,445; 22.82%) and Sue Fulton (127,533; 22.66%); Democrats had focused on DiMaso's healthcare coverage and a 2015 tax increase, while Republicans pointed to corresponding tax cuts in 2016.

== New Jersey Assembly ==
With Declan O'Scanlon running for Senate to fill the seat vacated by fellow Republican Joseph Kyrillos, DiMaso was chosen to run for O'Scanlon's Assembly seat. In the November 2017 general election, DiMaso (with 34,214 votes; 27.5% of all ballots cast) and her running mate, incumbent Amy Handlin (with 35,990; 28.9%), defeated Democratic challengers Tom Giaimo (27,212; 21.9%) and Mariel DiDato (26,640; 21.4%) to win both Assembly seats from the district for the Republicans. DiMaso serves in the Assembly on the Education Committee; the Human Services Committee; and the Law and Public Safety Committee. In July 2018 fellow Assemblyman Eric Houghtaling and fellow Assemblywoman Joann Downey filed a complaint against DiMaso for violating the truth Truth-In-Caller ID act.

On March 18, 2021, DiMaso lost the support of the Monmouth County Republican Committee following a contested convention for her Assembly seat. Holmdel School Board President Vicky Flynn defeated DiMaso by a landslide 145 to 87 margin. Incumbent Assemblyman Gerard Scharfenberger came in first with 213 votes. Afterward, DiMaso sought election in the Republican primary race without the Monmouth County Republican Committee's support, but placed a distant third behind Scharfenberger and Flynn.

== Electoral history ==
=== Assembly ===
New Jersey general election, 2017
Party	Candidate	Votes	%	±%
Republican	Amy Handlin	35,990	28.9	▼1.5
Republican	Serena DiMaso	34,214	27.5	▼1.6
Democratic	Tom Giaimo	27,212	21.9	▲2.1
Democratic	Mariel DiDato	26,640	21.4	▲1.8
Libertarian	Eveline H. Brownstein	458	0.4	N/A
Total votes		'124,514'	'100.0'	

New Jersey General Assembly
Preceded by Declan O'Scanlon	Member of the New Jersey General Assembly for the 13th District; January 9, 2018–January 11, 2022; With: Amy Handlin	Succeeded by Vicky Flynn
