= Joann Downey =

American politician (born 1966)

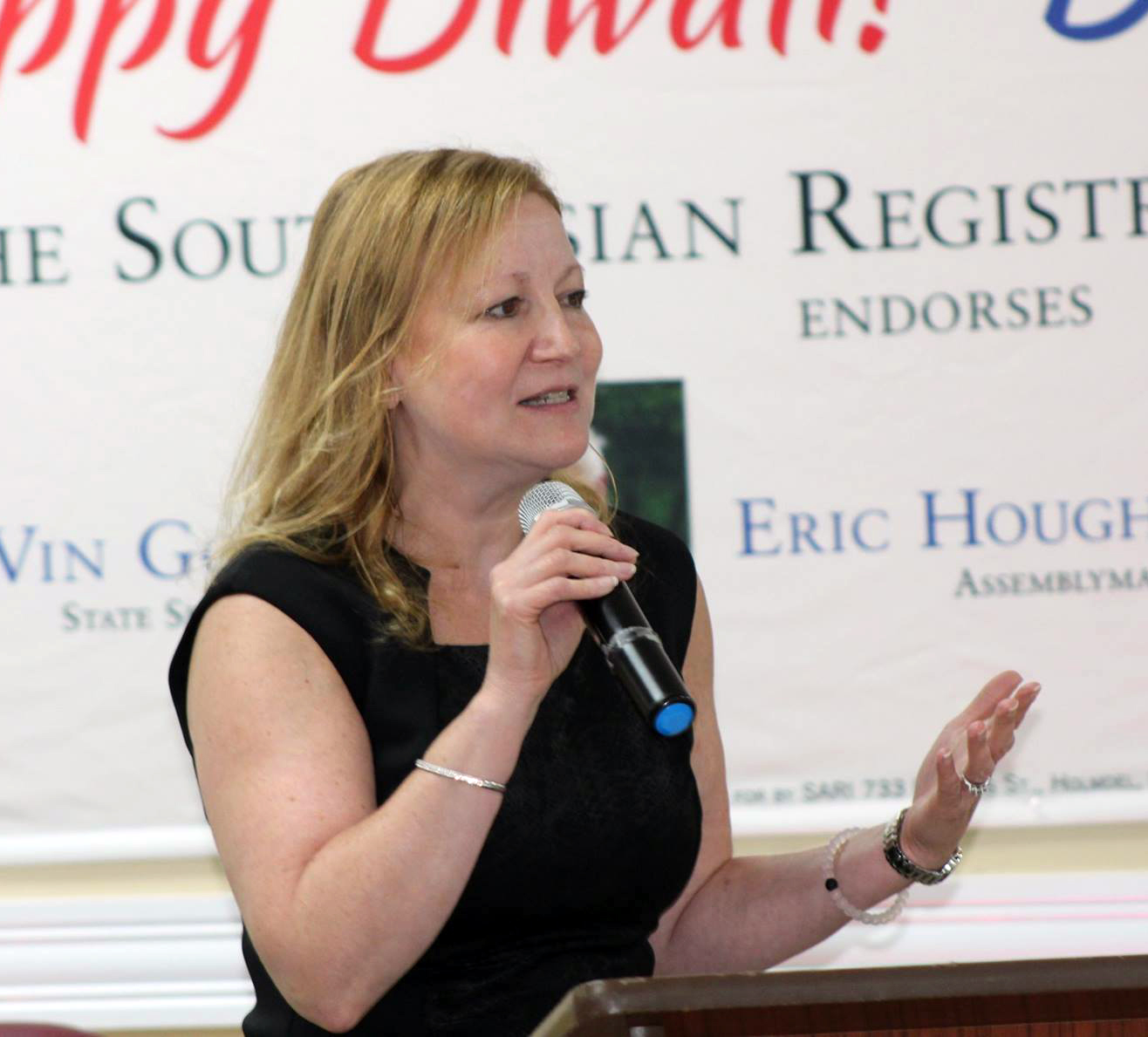

Member of the New Jersey General Assembly from the 11th district
- In office January 12, 2016 – January 11, 2022 Serving with Eric Houghtaling
- Preceded by: Mary Pat Angelini; Caroline Casagrande
- Succeeded by: Marilyn Piperno; Kimberly Eulner

Chair of the New Jersey General Assembly Committee on Human Services
- In office January 9, 2018 – January 11, 2022
- Preceded by: Valerie Vainieri Huttle

Personal details
- Born: Joann Lillian Kagan; October 31, 1966 (age 59) Jersey City, New Jersey, U.S.
- Political party: Democratic
- Spouse: Stephen Downey
- Education: Rutgers University, New Brunswick (BA); New York Law School (JD); Boston University (MSW)
- Website: www.njleg.state.nj.us/members/bio.asp?Leg=380

Joann Kagan Downey (born October 31, 1966) is an American lawyer and Democratic Party politician who represented the 11th Legislative District in the New Jersey General Assembly from 2016 to 2022. She later became a judge.

== Early life ==
Downey was born in Jersey City, New Jersey. She holds a Bachelor of Arts from Rutgers University in 1988, where she studied Political Science and English, a Juris Doctor from New York Law School in June 1991 and a Masters of Social Work from Boston University School of Social Work in 2005. After graduating from Freehold Township High School, Downey was accepted to the New Jersey State Police, inspired by her father, who was a New Jersey State Trooper. Downey ultimately decided to pursue law school and prosecutorial work instead. She went on to serve as Deputy State Attorney General, working in the Department of Children and Families. Downey cites this experience as the impetus that moved her to work toward her Masters in Social Work.

== New Jersey Assembly ==
Downey was elected to the General Assembly alongside running mate Eric Houghtaling in November 2015. Their narrow victory was considered by many to be an unexpected upset. In July 2018 Downey and fellow Assemblyman Eric Houghtaling accused fellow Assemblywoman Serena DiMaso of violating the Truth-In-Caller ID law while sending out robocalls.

In 2021, Downey and Houghtaling narrowly lost their reelection bids in an upset to Republican candidates Marilyn Piperno and Kim Eulner.

== Electoral history ==
=== Assembly ===
New Jersey general election, 2017
Party	Candidate	Votes	%	±%
Democratic	Joann Downey	31,347	27.7	▲2.5
Democratic	Eric Houghtaling	31,012	27.4	▲1.8
Republican	Robert Acerra	25,672	22.6	▼2.2
Republican	Michael Whelan	25,320	22.3	▼2.1
Total votes		'113,351'	'100.0'	

New Jersey general election, 2015
Party	Candidate	Votes	%	±%
Democratic	Eric Houghtaling	15,149	25.6	▲5.0
Democratic	Joann Downey	14,906	25.2	▲5.0
Republican	Mary Pat Angelini	14,653	24.8	▼5.3
Republican	Caroline Casagrande	14,418	24.4	▼4.7
Total votes		'59,126'	'100.0'	

New Jersey General Assembly
Preceded by Mary Pat Angelini; Caroline Casagrande	Member of the New Jersey General Assembly for the 11th District; January 12, 2016 – January 11, 2022; With: Eric Houghtaling	Succeeded by Marilyn Piperno; Kimberly Eulner
