= Eric Houghtaling =

American politician

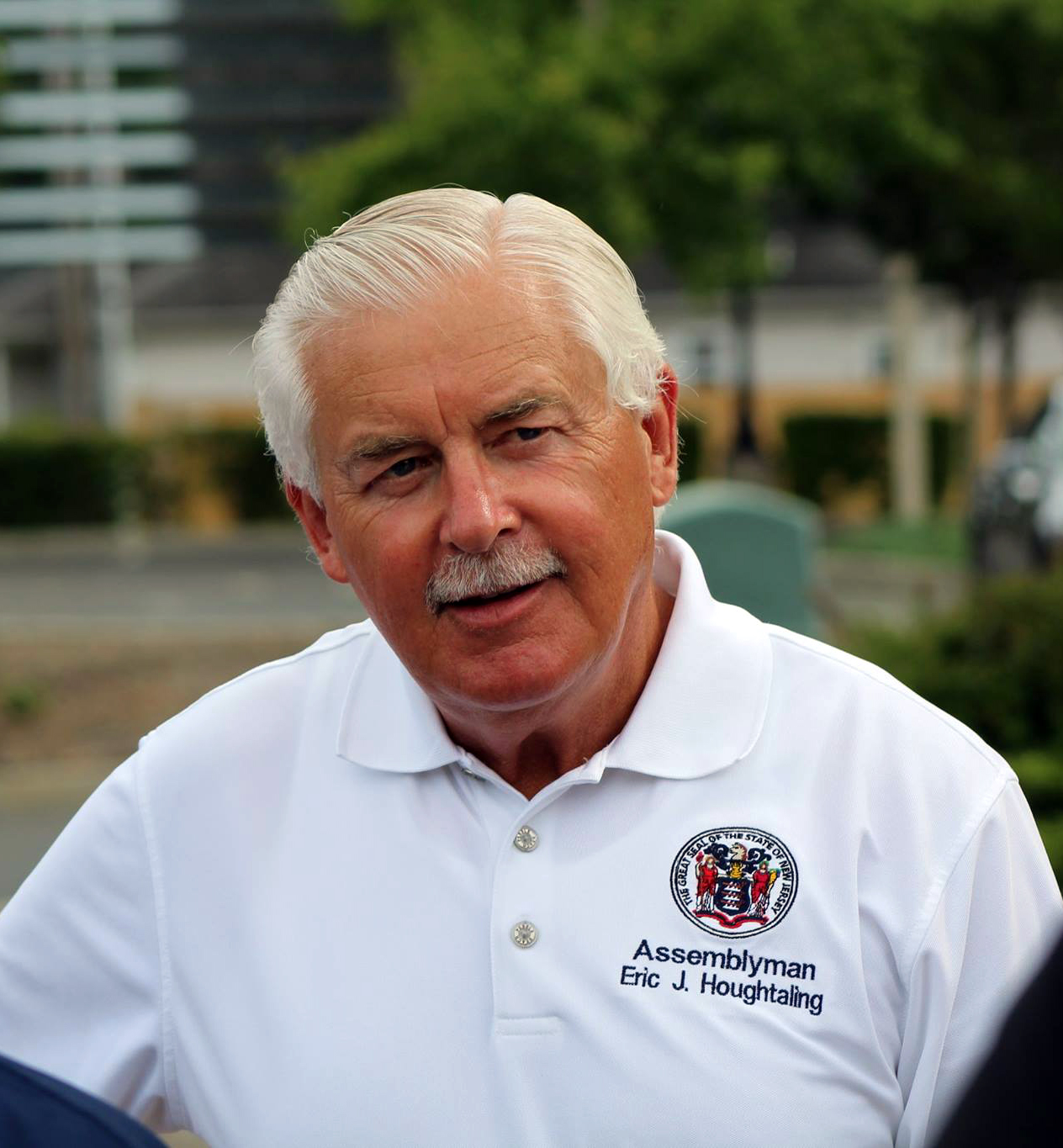

Member of the New Jersey General Assembly from the 11th District
- In office January 12, 2016 – January 11, 2022 Serving with Joann Downey
- Preceded by: Mary Pat Angelini; Caroline Casagrande
- Succeeded by: Marilyn Piperno; Kimberly Eulner

Deputy Majority Leader of the New Jersey General Assembly
- In office January 9, 2018 – January 11, 2022
- Leader: Louis Greenwald
- Preceded by: Angelica M. Jimenez

Chair of the New Jersey General Assembly Committee on Agriculture and Natural Resources
- In office January 14, 2019 – January 11, 2022
- Preceded by: Bob Andrzejczak

Personal details
- Born: September 5, 1954 (age 71) Neptune Township, New Jersey
- Party: Democratic
- Spouse: Linda Houghtaling
- Website: Legislative Website

Eric Houghtaling (born September 5, 1954) is an American Democratic politician who represented the 11th Legislative District in the New Jersey General Assembly from 2016 to 2022, which covers portions of Monmouth County. Prior to his election to the assembly, Houghtaling served as an elected official in Neptune Township, New Jersey.

== Early life ==
Houghtaling was born in Neptune Township, New Jersey. He is currently a resident of Neptune. Houghtaling works as an electrician and member of the International Brotherhood of Electrical Workers. Houghtaling and his wife, Linda, have three children and seven grandchildren. Houghtaling served on the Neptune Township Council from 2011 to 2015, and later became Mayor of Neptune Township in 2013.

== New Jersey Assembly ==
Houghtaling was elected to the General Assembly alongside running mate Joann Downey in November 2015, defeating Mary Pat Angelini and Caroline Casagrande. Houghtaling and Downey's victory was considered to be an unexpected upset. Houghtaling was sworn into office on January 12, 2016. Houghtaling has worked to increase public awareness of Pancreatic Cancer and introduced legislation, which was later signed into law, designating November as Pancreatic Cancer Awareness Month in New Jersey. In July 2018 Houghtaling and fellow Assemblywoman Joann Downey accused fellow Assemblywoman Serena DiMaso of violating the Truth-In-Caller ID while sending out robocalls.

In 2021, Houghtaling and Downey narrowly lost their reelection bids in an upset to Republican candidates Marilyn Piperno and Kim Eulner.

=== Committees ===
- Agriculture and Natural Resources
- Oversight, Reform and Federal Relations
- Labor
- Telecommunications and Utilities

== Electoral history ==
=== Assembly ===
New Jersey general election, 2017
| Party | Candidate | Votes | % | ±% |
|---|---|---|---|---|
| Democratic | Joann Downey | 31,347 | 27.7 | ▲2.5 |
| Democratic | Eric Houghtaling | 31,012 | 27.4 | ▲1.8 |
| Republican | Robert Acerra | 25,672 | 22.6 | ▼2.2 |
| Republican | Michael Whelan | 25,320 | 22.3 | ▼2.1 |
| Total votes | | '113,351' | '100.0' | |

New Jersey general election, 2015
| Party | Candidate | Votes | % | ±% |
|---|---|---|---|---|
| Democratic | Eric Houghtaling | 15,149 | 25.6 | ▲5.0 |
| Democratic | Joann Downey | 14,906 | 25.2 | ▲5.0 |
| Republican | Mary Pat Angelini | 14,653 | 24.8 | ▼5.3 |
| Republican | Caroline Casagrande | 14,418 | 24.4 | ▼4.7 |
| Total votes | | '59,126' | '100.0' | |

New Jersey General Assembly
| Preceded by Mary Pat Angelini; Caroline Casagrande | Member of the New Jersey General Assembly for the 11th District; January 12, 2016 – January 11, 2022; With: Joann Downey | Succeeded by Marilyn Piperno; Kimberly Eulner |
