= Winters House =

Winters House may refer to:

in the United States (by state then town)

- Winters House (Sacramento, California), listed on the National Register of Historic Places (NRHP)
- Old Winters Ranch/Winters Mansion, Carson City, Nevada, listed on the NRHP in Washoe County
- Van Koert–Winters House, Franklin Lakes, New Jersey, listed on the NRHP in Bergen County
- Aaron Winters House, Franklin Lakes, New Jersey, listed on the NRHP in Bergen County
- Winters–Courter House, Franklin Lakes, New Jersey, listed on the NRHP in Bergen County
- Winters–Wimberley House, Wimberley, Texas, listed on the NRHP
- Frederick W. Winters House, Bellevue, Washington, listed on the NRHP in King County
