= Van Blarcom =

Van Blarcom is a surname. Notable people with the surname include:

- Benjamin Van Blarcom (1823–c.1901) Canadian politician
- Carolyn Conant Van Blarcom (1879–1960), American nurse
- Mary Van Blarcom (1913–1953), American artist

== See also ==
- Van Blarcom House
