= Winter House =

Winter House may refer to:

== Places ==
=== United States ===
- Amos G. Winter House, Kingfield, Maine, listed on the National Register of Historic Places (NRHP)
- Plimpton-Winter House, Wrentham, Massachusetts, NRHP-listed
- Winter House (Goodrich, North Dakota), NRHP-listed
- William Winter Stone House, Mt. Olive, Ohio, NRHP-listed

=== Canada ===
- Winterhouse Brook in Woody Point, Newfoundland and Labrador

== Television ==
- Winter House (TV series), a 2021 American reality series

== See also ==
- Winters House (disambiguation)
