= Van Blarcom House =

Van Blarcom House may refer to:

- Van Blarcom House (Franklin Lakes, New Jersey), listed on the National Register of Historic Places in Bergen County, New Jersey
- Van Blarcom House (Wyckoff, New Jersey), listed on the NRHP in Bergen County
- Albert Van Blarcom House, Wyckoff, New Jersey, listed on the NRHP in Bergen County
- Van Blarcom–Jardine House, Wyckoff, New Jersey, listed on the NRHP in Bergen County
