= National Register of Historic Places listings in Franklin Lakes, New Jersey =

Map of Bergen County, New Jersey, highlighting Franklin Lakes

List of the National Register of Historic Places listings in the borough of Franklin Lakes in Bergen County, New Jersey

Contents: Counties and communities in New Jersey
Atlantic – Bergen (Closter, Franklin Lakes, Ridgewood, Saddle River, Wyckoff) – Burlington – Camden – Cape May – Cumberland – Essex – Gloucester – Hudson – Hunterdon – Mercer – Middlesex – Monmouth – Morris – Ocean – Passaic – Salem – Somerset – Sussex – Union – Warren

The table below includes 14 sites listed on the National Register of Historic Places in the borough of Franklin Lakes in Bergen County, New Jersey. Latitude and longitude coordinates of the sites listed on this page may be displayed in an online map.

This National Park Service list is complete through NPS recent listings posted November 6, 2026.

== Current listings ==
	Name on the Register	Image	Date listed	Location	Description
1	Ackerman–Boyd House	Ackerman–Boyd House	January 9, 1983 (#83001452)	1095 Franklin Lake Road; 40°59′59″N 74°14′14″W	Part of the Early Stone Houses of Bergen County Multiple Property Submission (MPS)
2	Blauvelt House	Blauvelt House	August 8, 1985 (#85002590)	205 Woodside Avenue; 41°01′48″N 74°10′49″W	Part of the Early Stone Houses of Bergen County MPS
3	De Gray House	De Gray House	January 9, 1983 (#83001489)	650 Ewing Avenue; 41°00′07″N 74°11′51″W	Part of the Early Stone Houses of Bergen County MPS
4	Packer House	Packer House	January 9, 1983 (#83001540)	600 Ewing Avenue; 41°00′17″N 74°11′43″W	Part of the Early Stone Houses of Bergen County MPS
5	Albert Pulis House	Albert Pulis House	January 9, 1983 (#83001544)	322 Pulis Avenue; 41°01′49″N 74°11′44″W	Part of the Early Stone Houses of Bergen County MPS
6	Reaction Motors Rocket Test Facility	Reaction Motors Rocket Test Facility	June 6, 1979 (#79001472)	936 Dogwood Trail; 40°59′53″N 74°13′41″W	Razed 2002–2007
7	Storms House	Storms House	July 24, 1984 (#84002586)	1069 Franklin Lake Road; 40°59′56″N 74°14′06″W	Part of the Early Stone Houses of Bergen County MPS
8	Van Blarcom House	Van Blarcom House	July 24, 1984 (#84002588)	834 Franklin Lake Road; 40°59′33″N 74°12′55″W	Part of the Early Stone Houses of Bergen County MPS
9	Van Houten House	Van Houten House	January 9, 1983 (#83001576)	778 Vee Drive; 40°59′33″N 74°11′40″W	Part of the Early Stone Houses of Bergen County MPS. Demolished
10	Van Houten–Ackerman House	Van Houten–Ackerman House	January 9, 1983 (#83001573)	1150 Franklin Lake Road; 40°59′57″N 74°14′33″W	Part of the Early Stone Houses of Bergen County MPS
11	Van Koert–Winters House	Van Koert–Winters House	July 24, 1984 (#84002593)	615 Franklin Avenue; 41°00′48″N 74°11′45″W	Part of the Early Stone Houses of Bergen County MPS
12	Van Winkle House	Van Winkle House	July 24, 1984 (#84002595)	798 Franklin Lake Road; 40°59′35″N 74°12′44″W	Part of the Early Stone Houses of Bergen County MPS
13	Aaron Winters House	Aaron Winters House	July 24, 1984 (#84002599)	312 Hobar Court; 41°01′26″N 74°11′19″W	Part of the Early Stone Houses of Bergen County MPS
14	Winters–Courter House	Winters–Courter House	January 9, 1983 (#83001589)	831 Circle Avenue; 41°01′40″N 74°12′25″W	Part of the Early Stone Houses of Bergen County MPS
