= Ackerman–Boyd House =

United States historic place

- U.S. National Register of Historic Places
- New Jersey Register of Historic Places
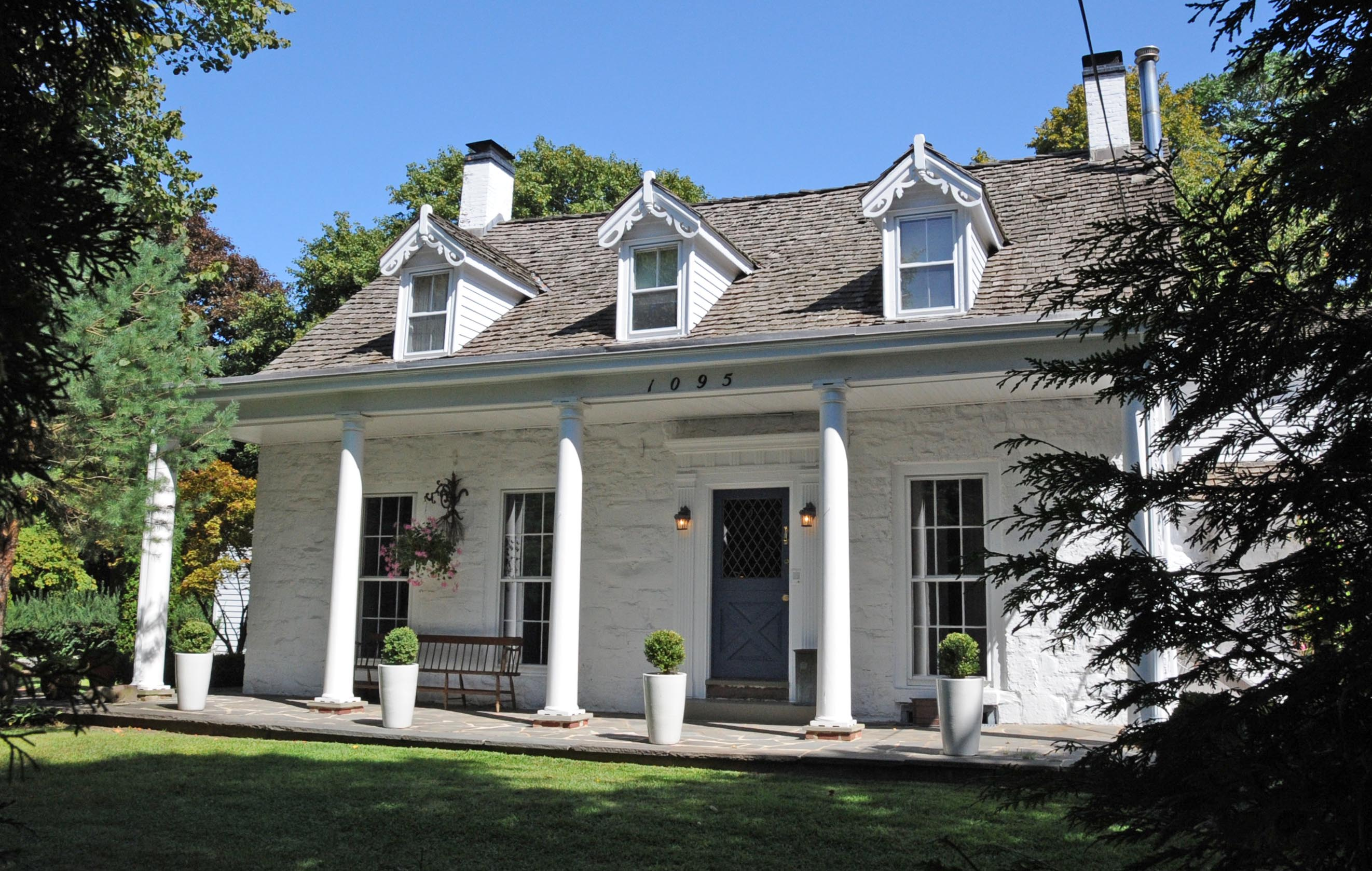

- Location within Bergen County, New Jersey Location within New Jersey Location within the United States
- Location: 1095 Franklin Lake Road, Franklin Lakes, New Jersey
- Coordinates: 40°59′59″N 74°14′14″W
- Area: 3 acres (1.2 ha)
- Built: c. 1785–1800
- MPS: Stone Houses of Bergen County TR
- NRHP reference No.: 83001452
- NJRHP No.: 493

Significant dates
- Added to NRHP: January 9, 1983
- Designated NJRHP: October 3, 1980

The Ackerman–Boyd House is a historic stone house located at 1095 Franklin Lake Road in the borough of Franklin Lakes in Bergen County, New Jersey, United States. The house was built around 1785 to 1800 and was added to the National Register of Historic Places on January 9, 1983, for its significance in architecture. It was listed as part of the Early Stone Houses of Bergen County Multiple Property Submission (MPS).

Johannes Louwrence Ackerman and his brother, Jacobus Louwrence Ackerman, purchased property here in 1727. James A. Ackerman built the house in the late 18th century. Adam Boyd purchased it in 1841 and likely expanded it.

== See also ==
- National Register of Historic Places listings in Franklin Lakes, New Jersey
- National Register of Historic Places listings in Bergen County, New Jersey
