= Albert Pulis House =

- U.S. National Register of Historic Places
- New Jersey Register of Historic Places
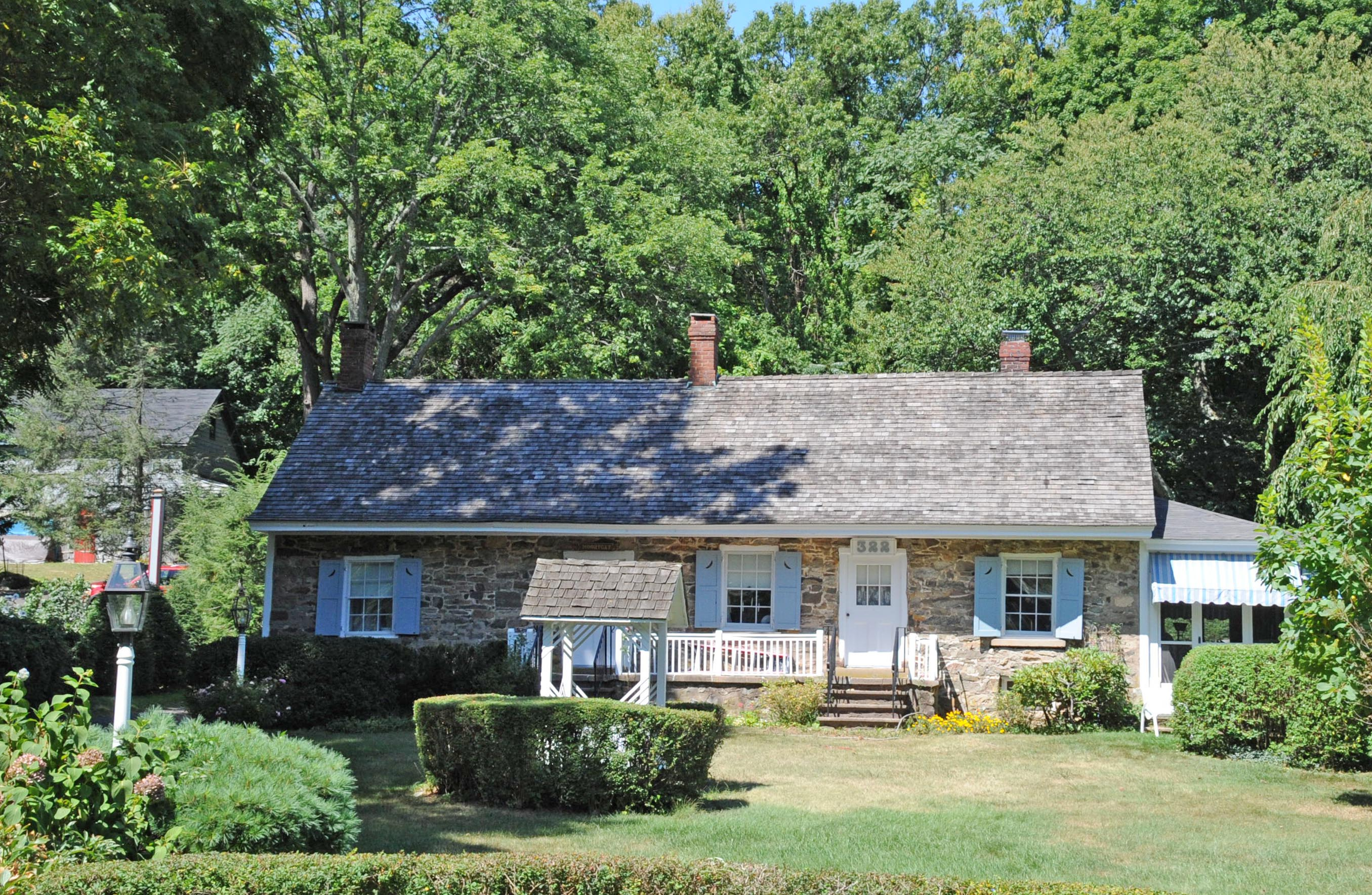

- Location within Bergen County, New Jersey Location within New Jersey Location within the United States
- Location: 322 Pulis Avenue, Franklin Lakes, New Jersey
- Coordinates: 41°01′49″N 74°11′44″W
- Built: c. 1805
- MPS: Stone Houses of Bergen County TR
- NRHP reference No.: 83001544
- NJRHP No.: 501

Significant dates
- Added to NRHP: January 9, 1983
- Designated NJRHP: October 3, 1980

The Albert Pulis House is located at 322 Pulis Avenue in the borough of Franklin Lakes in Bergen County, New Jersey, United States. The historic stone house was built around 1805, according to architectural evidence. It was added to the National Register of Historic Places on January 9, 1983, for its significance in architecture. It was listed as part of the Early Stone Houses of Bergen County Multiple Property Submission (MPS).

According to the nomination form, it has not been determined if Albert Pulis built the house, but he was living here in 1861. The property was sold to John H. Abram and Christian Carlough in 1881. The one and one-half story house has two entrance doors.

== See also ==
- National Register of Historic Places listings in Franklin Lakes, New Jersey
- National Register of Historic Places listings in Bergen County, New Jersey
