= Blauvelt House (Franklin Lakes, New Jersey) =

- U.S. National Register of Historic Places
- New Jersey Register of Historic Places
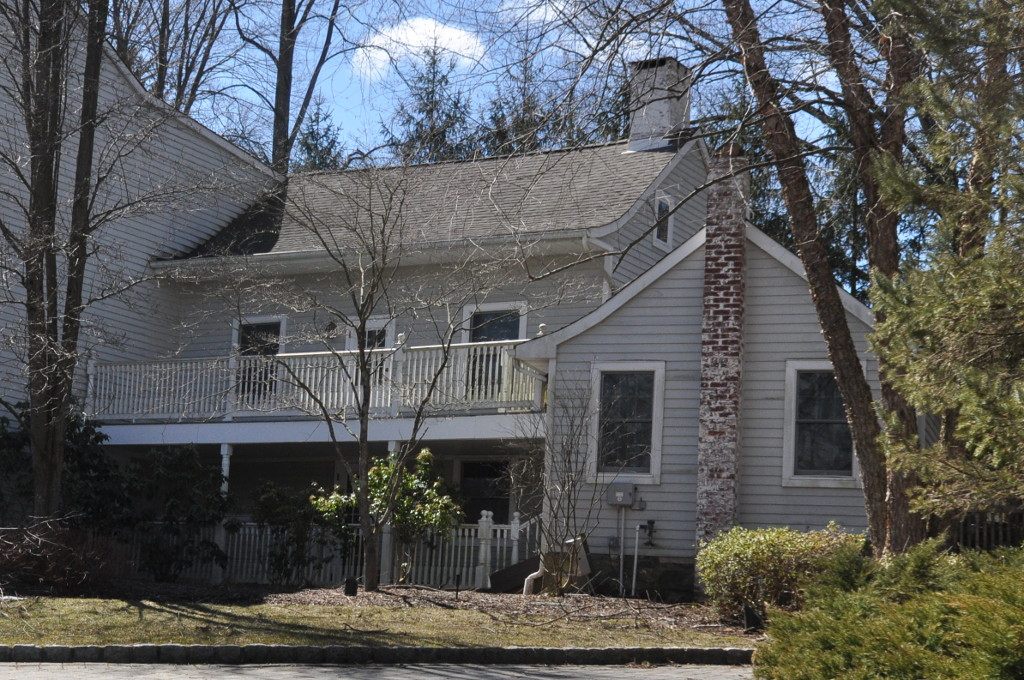

- Location within Bergen County, New Jersey Location within New Jersey Location within the United States
- Location: 205 Woodside Avenue, Franklin Lakes, New Jersey
- Coordinates: 41°01′48″N 74°10′49″W
- MPS: Stone Houses of Bergen County TR
- NRHP reference No.: 85002590
- NJRHP No.: 495

Significant dates
- Added to NRHP: August 8, 1985
- Designated NJRHP: June 7, 1985

The Blauvelt House is located at 205 Woodside Avenue in the borough of Franklin Lakes in Bergen County, New Jersey, United States. The historic stone house was added to the National Register of Historic Places on August 8, 1985, for its significance in architecture and exploration/settlement. It was listed as part of the Early Stone Houses of Bergen County Multiple Property Submission (MPS).

According to the nomination form, the house was likely built by a member of the Blauvelt family in last quarter of the 18th century, based on historical evidence. It was owned by John Blauvelt by 1876.

== See also ==
- National Register of Historic Places listings in Franklin Lakes, New Jersey
- National Register of Historic Places listings in Bergen County, New Jersey
