= Noelle Bassi =

American swimmer (born 1983)

Personal information
- Born: December 1, 1983 (age 42)
Medal record
Women's swimming
Representing the United States
Pan American Games
Silver medal – second place	2003 Santo Domingo	200m Butterfly

Noelle Bassi (married name: Noelle Bassi Smith; born December 1, 1983) is a butterfly swimmer from the United States, who won the silver medal in the women's 200m butterfly event at the 2003 Pan American Games. She is best known for her 2004 National Champion title in the 200m butterfly, and her placement on the top 25 world/top 10 U.S. rankings lists for six consecutive years. Bassi is a three-time Olympic Trial Qualifier (2000, 2004, 2008), and a 2004 Olympic Trial Finalist for the U.S. team.

During her tenure at Harvard University, she served as captain of the Varsity Swimming and Diving team and broke three school records. In 2006, she was the Ivy League Championship Swimmer of the Meet and in 2007 broke the Ivy League record in the 200yard butterfly. She is a multiple time NCAA Division I All-American and Academic All-American. She helped the Harvard Women's Swimming and Diving team to win dual meets against top-ranked teams.

She is a native of Franklin Lakes, New Jersey. She lives in Connecticut with her husband Justin Smith, a former swimming teammate, at the end of 2008.

Noelle graduated cum laude from Harvard University in 2007 with a B.A. in psychology. She is a graduate student in the Clinical Psychology PhD Program at Southern Methodist University (SMU).

== Publications ==
- Smith, N.B., Steele, A.M., Weitzman, M., Trueba, A.F., & Meuret, A.E. (in press). Investigating the role of self-disgust in nonsuicidal self-injury. Archives of Suicide Research.
- Smith, N.B., Kouros, C., & Meuret, A.E. (2013). The role of trauma symptoms in nonsuicidal self-injury. Trauma, Violence, & Abuse.
- Trueba, A.F., Smith, N.B., Auchus, R.J., & Ritz, T. (2013). Academic exam stress and depressive symptoms are associated with reductions in exhaled nitric oxide in healthy individuals. Biological Psychology, 93, 206-212. doi: 10.1016/j.biopsycho.2013.01.017
- Smith, N.B. & Meuret, A.E. (2012). The role of painful events and pain perception in Blood-Injection, Injury fears. Journal of Behavior Therapy and Experimental Psychiatry, 43, 1045-1048.
- Smith, N.B. & Calvert, J.D. (2011). Low dose doxepin for insomnia: Silenor or generic? The Tablet, 12, 10-17.
- Smith, N.B., Trueba, A.F., Jeter, A.M., Stevens, V.R., & Meuret, A.E. (November 2012). Nonsuicidal Self-injury as a Unique Predictor of Alcohol, Illicit Drug, and Prescription Drug Use. Poster accepted for presentation at Suicide and Self-Injury Special Interest Group Exhibition at the Association for Behavioral and Cognitive Therapies (ABCT) Annual Convention, National Harbor, MD.
- Smith, N.B., Baldwin, A., Jeter, A.M., Trueba, A.F., & Meuret, A.E. (November 2012). Differences in Attitudes and Perceptions Among Self-injuring Versus Non-injuring College Students. Poster accepted for presentation at Suicide and Self-Injury Special Interest Group Exhibition at the Association for Behavioral and Cognitive Therapies (ABCT) Annual Convention, National Harbor, MD.
- Trueba, A.F., Smith, N.B., Jeter, A.M., & Ritz, T. (November 2012). Increased Risk of Inflammatory Conditions and Childhood Illness among Self-injurers. Poster submitted for presentation at Suicide and Self-Injury Special Interest Group Exhibition at the Association for Behavioral and Cognitive Therapies (ABCT) Annual Convention, National Harbor, MD.
- Smith. N.B., Jeter, A.M., Weitzman, M.L., & Meuret, A.E. (November 2012). Association of Temporal Proximity of Self-harm and Clinical Characteristics in Nonsuicidal Self-Injury. Talk accepted for symposium entitled "Nonsuicidal Self-Injury: Who and When?" at the Association for Behavioral and Cognitive Therapies (ABCT) Annual Convention, National Harbor, MD.
- Smith. N.B., Weitzman, M.L., Jeter, A.M., Trueba, A.F., & Meuret, A.E. (November 2012). The Relationship between Nonsuicidal Self-injury, Trauma History, Depression and Pain Tolerance. Poster accepted for presentation at the Association for Behavioral and Cognitive Therapies (ABCT) Annual Convention, National Harbor, MD.
- Weitzman, M.L., Smith. N.B., & Meuret, A.E. (November 2012). Synchrony of Emotional Response in Blood-Injection-Injury Phobia. Poster accepted for presentation at the Association for Behavioral and Cognitive Therapies (ABCT) Annual Convention, National Harbor, MD.
- Jeter, A.M., Smith, N.B., & Meuret, A.E. (November 2012). Examining the Mediating Role of Experiential Avoidance in the Relationship between Abuse and Self-injury Status. Poster accepted for presentation at the Association for Behavioral and Cognitive Therapies (ABCT) Annual Convention, National Harbor, MD.
- Smith, N.B., Weitzman, M.L., Jeter, A.M., Trueba, A.F., & Meuret, A.E. (June 2012). The Moderating Role of Nonsuicidal Self-Injury and Trauma History in the Relation Between Depression and Pain Tolerance. Poster presented at the International Society for the Study of Self-Injury Annual Meeting, Chapel Hill, NC.
- Smith, N.B., Trueba, A.F., Jeter, A.M., Weitzman, M.L., & Meuret, A.E. (June 2012). Physiological and Experiential Arousal to Emotional-Stimuli in Nonsuicidal Self-injury. Poster presented at the International Society for the Study of Self-Injury Annual Meeting, Chapel Hill, NC.
- Jeter, A.M., Smith, N.B., & Meuret, A.E. (June 2012). Experiential Avoidance Mediates the Relationship Between Abuse and Nonsuicidal Self-Injury. Poster presented at the International Society for the Study of Self-Injury Annual Meeting, Chapel Hill, NC.
- Smith, N.B., Jeter, A.M., Weitzman, M., & Meuret, A.E. (February 2012). Current Self-injurers, Former Self-injurers, and Non-injurers: Do they differ? Poster presented at Southern Methodist University Research Day, Dallas, TX.
- Stevens, V.R., Smith, N.B., Weitzman, M., Jeter, A.M., & Meuret, A.E. (February 2012). Tattoos and Piercings Among Nonsuicidal Self-injurers. Poster presented at Southern Methodist University Research Day, Dallas, TX. *Served as graduate student mentor.
- Jeter, A.M., Smith, N.B., & Meuret, A.E. (February 2012). Does Experiential Avoidance Increase the Likelihood of Nonsuicidal Self-injury? Poster presented at Southern Methodist University Research Day, Dallas, TX. *Received research award for presentation.
- Meuret, A.E., Smith, N.B., Ritz, T., & Weitzman, M.L. (February 2012). For Better or for Worse – Non-suicidal Self-injury an Antithesis of Blood Phobia? Invited paper presented at the Psychiatric Research Society Annual Meeting, Park City, UT.
- Jeter, A.M., Smith, N.B., & Meuret, A.E. (November 2011). Investigating the Role of Experiential Avoidance and Deliberate Self-harm. Poster presented at Suicide and Self-Injury Special Interest Group Exhibition at the Association for Behavioral and Cognitive Therapies (ABCT) Annual Convention, Toronto, Canada. *Received research award for presentation.
- Smith, N.B. & Meuret (November, 2011). The Role of Pain Perception and Painful Experiences in Blood-Injection-Injury Fears. Poster presented at the Association for Behavioral and Cognitive Therapies (ABCT) Annual Convention, Toronto, Canada.
- Weitzman, M., Smith, N.B., & Meuret, A.E. (November 2011). Psychological Correlates of Self-Injury. Poster presented at the Association for Behavioral and Cognitive Therapies (ABCT) Annual Convention, Toronto, Canada.
