= John A. Spizziri =

American politician (born 1934)

Member of the New Jersey General Assembly from the 40th Legislative District
- In office January 8, 1974 – January 10, 1978
- Preceded by: District created
- Succeeded by: W. Cary Edwards and Walter M. D. Kern

Member of the New Jersey General Assembly from District 13C
- In office January 11, 1972 – January 8, 1974 Serving with C. Gus Rys
- Preceded by: William M. Crane and Richard Vander Plaat
- Succeeded by: District abolished

Personal details
- Born: September 2, 1934 (age 90); Paterson, New Jersey
- Political party: Republican

John Anthony Spizziri (born September 2, 1934) is an American attorney and Republican Party politician who served in the New Jersey General Assembly from 1972 to 1978, representing District 13C for a single two-year term from 1972 to 1974 and then representing the 40th Legislative District for two terms, from 1974 to 1978, following the creation of the 40-district structure for the New Jersey Legislature in 1973. In addition to his private law practice, Spizziri served as attorney to the Planning Board for the Borough of Franklin Lakes, New Jersey for 43 years.

== Early life and education ==
Spizziri earned degrees from Georgetown University's College of Arts and Sciences and from the Georgetown University Law Center. Born in Paterson, New Jersey and a resident of Franklin Lakes when he served in the Assembly, Spizziri was elected to the Wyckoff Township Committee in 1966. In 1972 he was appointed as attorney to the Planning Board for the Borough of Franklin Lakes, serving in that capacity until his retirement in 2015.

== Legislative career ==
In the 1971 general election, the last in which districts were allocated by county, Spizziri (with 29,416 votes) and his Republican running mate C. Gus Rys (with 30,714) defeated Democrats Anthony Spataro (22,850) and Marjorie A. Wyngaarden (22,670) to win the two seats in District 13C, covering portions of Bergen County. With the creation of the 40-district New Jersey Legislature and the first election under this format held in 1973, Spizziri (who received 28,156 ballots cast) and Rys (29,386) were elected to office representing the 40th Legislative District, defeating Democrats Vincent A. Girardy (27,793) and Paul S. Konstadt (26,957). In the 1975 general election, Spizziri (topping the balloting with 31,614 votes) and Rys (with 31,470), were re-elected, defeating Democratic challengers Rose Brunetto (21,170) and Paul Lewis (20,851).

In 1977, Spizziri sponsored legislation that would require leasing agents to be licensed and to return any fees charged in excess of $10 if the agent was unable to find an appropriate apartment unit for the prospective renter.

In May 1977, a New York City resident was arrested for having several prescription tranquilizer pills in an unmarked vial, after a jacket holding the vial was dragged away by a dog and was found by someone who turned it into the police; the individual who owned the jacket—and the pills that had been inside it—had removed the pills from a labeled prescription bottle and placed it in an unmarked pillbox in order to take the medication over the course of the day, but was arrested by the local police and the Bergen County Prosecutors Office was considering indicting the individual under a provision of state law that prohibited individuals from transporting certain prescription tranquilizers in anything other than the marked medicine bottle in which the medication had been dispensed by a pharmacy. Spizziri proposed legislation in the General Assembly that would allow people to carry two days worth of medication in an unmarked vial, as long as the individual could demonstrate a medical need for carrying the pills and had documentation demonstrating the nature of the prescription along with details of the prescribing physician and pharmacist. He noted that many of his colleagues in the legislature would often carry prescription medication in unmarked vials.

After his two-term Assembly partner and former running mate C. Gus Rys announced in March 1977 that he would not run for re-election, Spizziri faced a primary battle fought between competing groups within the Republican Party in Bergen County and came in third with 6,670 votes, behind W. Cary Edwards (7,656) and Walter M. D. Kern (6,952). Among the 120 primary contests being held that year statewide for the entire New Jersey Legislature, Spizziri was one of four incumbents, and the only Republican, to lose their bid for renomination in the primaries.

== Personal life ==
Spizziri married Alexandra Vitale, with whom he has two children. Upon his retirement in 2015, the couple moved to Ryegate, Montana.
