= Storms House (Franklin Lakes, New Jersey) =

Historic house in New Jersey, United States

- U.S. National Register of Historic Places
- New Jersey Register of Historic Places
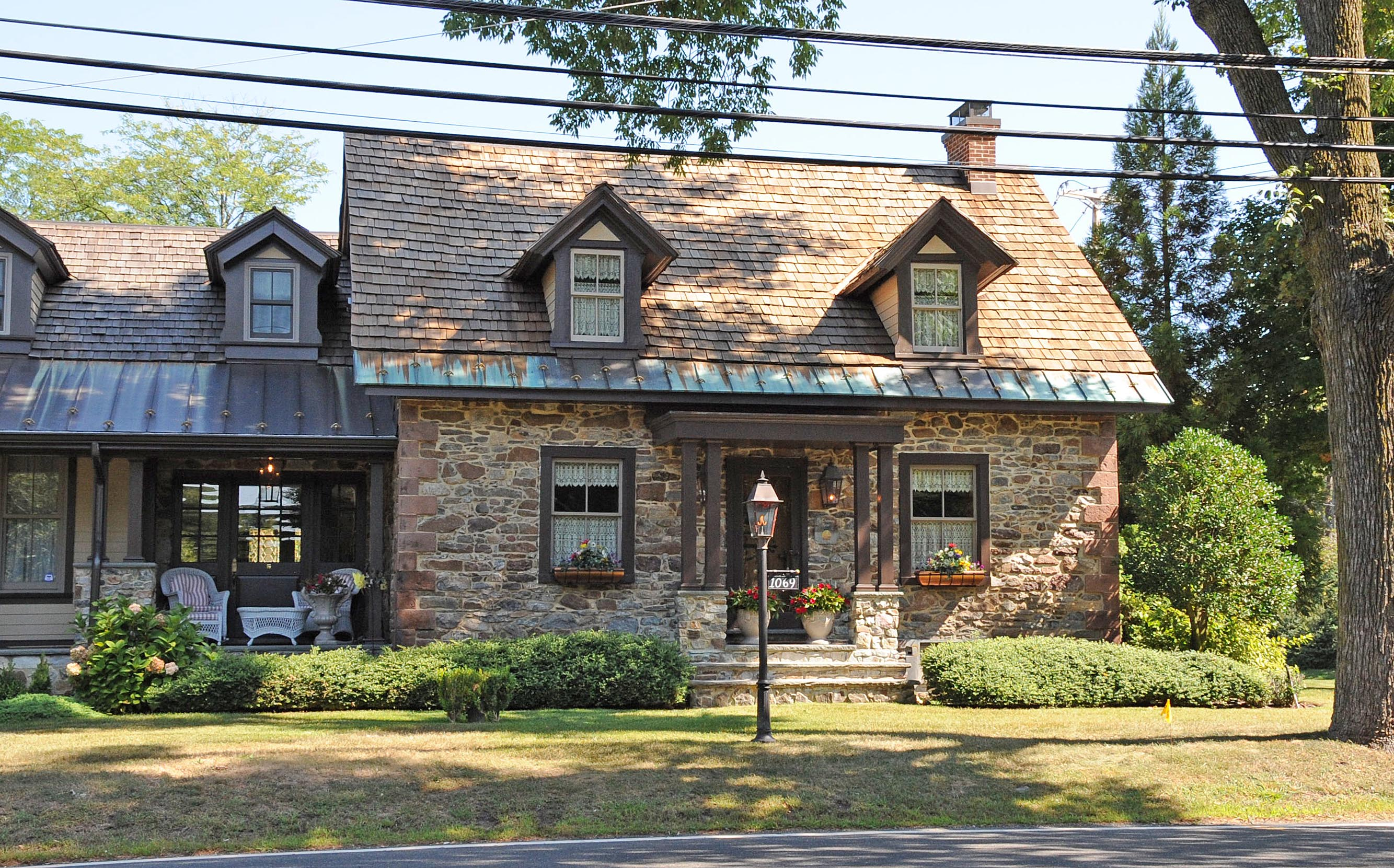

- Location within Bergen County, New Jersey Location within New Jersey Location within the United States
- Location: 1069 Franklin Lake Road, Franklin Lakes, New Jersey
- Coordinates: 40.9987°N 74.2345°W
- Built: c. 1750–1770
- MPS: Stone Houses of Bergen County TR
- NRHP reference No.: 84002586
- NJRHP No.: 504

Significant dates
- Added to NRHP: July 24, 1984
- Designated NJRHP: October 3, 1980

The Storms House is located at 1069 Franklin Lake Road in the borough of Franklin Lakes in Bergen County, New Jersey, United States. The historic stone house was built around 1750–1770 and was added to the National Register of Historic Places on July 24, 1984, for its significance in architecture and exploration/settlement. It was listed as part of the Early Stone Houses of Bergen County Multiple Property Submission (MPS).

The one and one-half story house features a gable roof. William Storms owned it in 1861.

== See also ==
- National Register of Historic Places listings in Franklin Lakes, New Jersey
- National Register of Historic Places listings in Bergen County, New Jersey
