= Reaction Motors Rocket Test Facility =

- U.S. National Register of Historic Places
- New Jersey Register of Historic Places
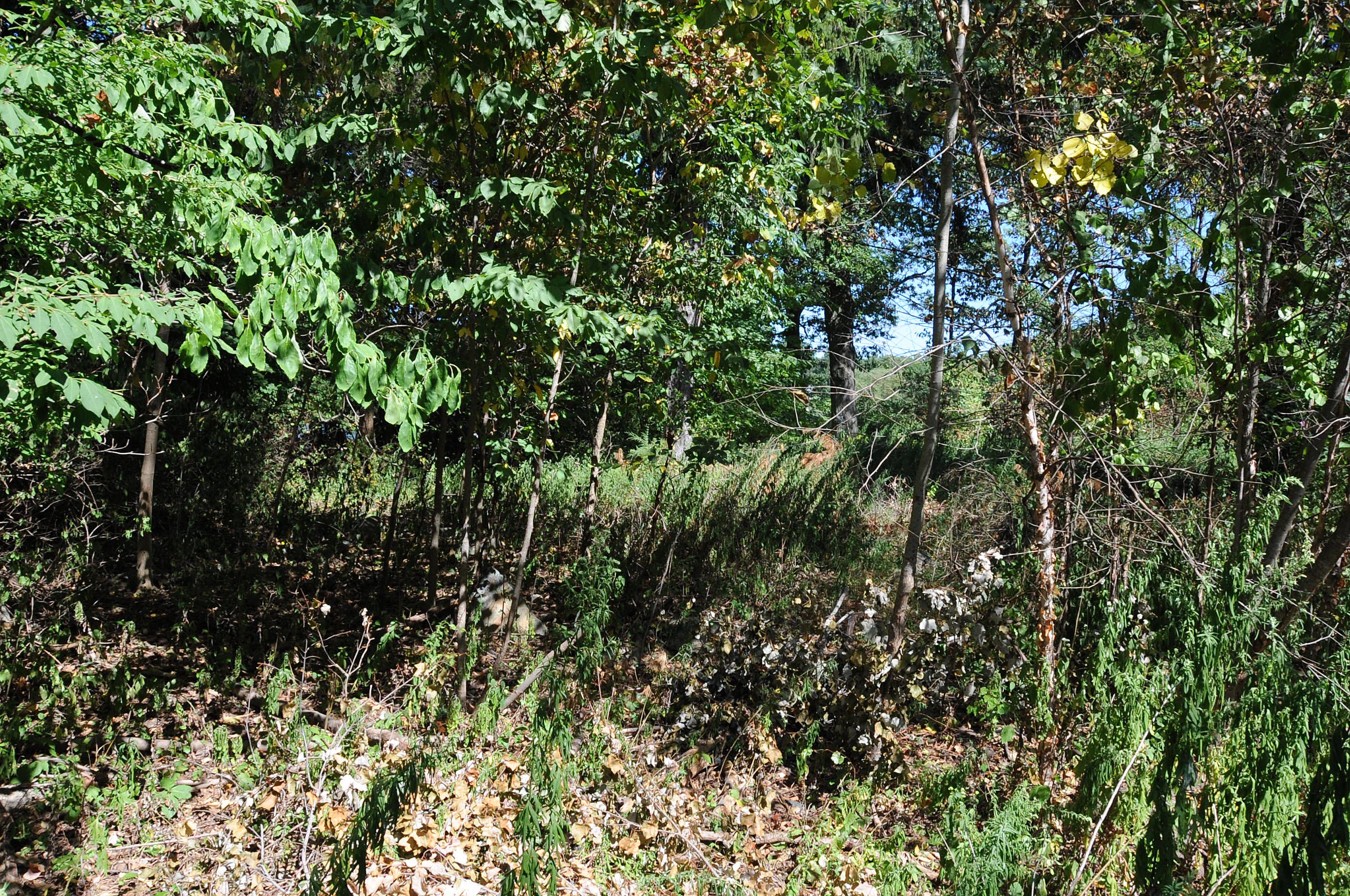
- Little remains of the site

- Location within Bergen County, New Jersey Location within New Jersey Location within the United States
- Location: 936 Dogwood Trail, Franklin Lakes, New Jersey
- Coordinates: 40°59′53″N 74°13′41″W
- Built: 1942
- NRHP reference No.: 79001472
- NJRHP No.: 503

Significant dates
- Added to NRHP: June 6, 1979
- Designated NJRHP: November 28, 1978

The Reaction Motors Rocket Test Facility was located at 936 Dogwood Trail in the borough of Franklin Lakes in Bergen County, New Jersey, United States. The facility was built in 1942 and was added to the National Register of Historic Places on June 6, 1979, for its significance in engineering, industry, invention, and science. A prototype of a jet assisted takeoff rocket was tested here. According to the New Jersey Historic Preservation Office online system, the site was razed between 2002 and 2007.

== See also ==
- National Register of Historic Places listings in Franklin Lakes, New Jersey
- National Register of Historic Places listings in Bergen County, New Jersey
