= Franklin Lakes Public Schools =

School district in Bergen County, New Jersey, US

Address
- 490 Pulis Avenue Franklin Lakes, Bergen County, New Jersey, 07417; United States

District information
- Grades: Pre-K–8
- Superintendent: Gregorio Maceri
- Business administrator: Dina Messery
- Schools: 4

Students and staff
- Enrollment: 1,200 (as of 2023–24)
- Faculty: 144.1 FTEs
- Student–teacher ratio: 8.3:1

Other information
- District Factor Group: I
- Website: district.franklinlakes.k12.nj.us
Ind.	Per pupil	District spending	Rank (*)	K-8 average	%± vs. average
1A	Total Spending	$23,294	84	$18,891	23.3%
1	Budgetary Cost	20,190	84	14,159	42.6%
2	Classroom Instruction	13,165	84	8,659	52.0%
6	Support Services	3,047	80	2,167	40.6%
8	Administrative Cost	1,948	78	1,547	25.9%
10	Operations & Maintenance	1,923	72	1,612	19.3%
13	Extracurricular Activities	104	50	104	0.0%
16	Median Teacher Salary	64,071	61	61,136
Data from NJDoE 2014 Taxpayers' Guide to Education Spending. *Of K-8 districts with more than 750 students. Lowest spending=1; Highest=84

The Franklin Lakes Public Schools are a community public school district serving students in pre-kindergarten through eighth grade from Franklin Lakes, in Bergen County, in the U.S. state of New Jersey.

As of the 2023–24 school year, the district, comprised of four schools, had an enrollment of 1,200 students and 144.1 classroom teachers (on an FTE basis), for a student–teacher ratio of 8.3:1.

Students in public school for ninth through twelfth grades attend the schools of the Ramapo Indian Hills Regional High School District, a regional district consisting of two four-year public high schools serving students from Franklin Lakes, Oakland and Wyckoff. Before enrolling, students have the option to choose to attend either of the district's high schools. Schools in the high school district (with 2023–24 enrollment data from the National Center for Education Statistics) are Indian Hills High School, located in Oakland (694 students) and Ramapo High School, located in Franklin Lakes (1,188 students).

== History ==
Prior to the formation of the regional high school district, students from Franklin Lakes had attended Ramsey High School as part of a sending/receiving relationship, until the Ramsey Public School District informed officials from both Franklin Lakes and Wyckoff that the Ramsey school would no longer have space to accommodate out-of-district students after the 1956–57 school year; Oakland, which had sent its students to Pompton Lakes High School, joined Franklin Lakes and Wyckoff in considering a regional school district. The creation of a regional high school was approved in 1954 by all three communities by a margin of 1,060 to 51.

The district had been classified by the New Jersey Department of Education as being in District Factor Group "I", the second-highest of eight groupings. District Factor Groups organize districts statewide to allow comparison by common socioeconomic characteristics of the local districts. From lowest socioeconomic status to highest, the categories are A, B, CD, DE, FG, GH, I and J.

== Awards and recognition ==
For the 2005-06 school year, the district was recognized with the "Best Practices Award" by the New Jersey Department of Education for its "Artist Historians" Social Studies program at Franklin Avenue Middle School.

== Schools ==
Schools in the district (with 2023–24 enrollment data from the National Center for Education Statistics) are:

Elementary schools

- Colonial Road School with 246 students in grades PreK–5
  - Christine Gagliardo, principal
- High Mountain Road School with 297 students in grades PreK–5
  - Jaclyn Bajzath, principal
- Woodside Avenue School with 281 students in grades K–5
  - Ann Jameson, principal

Middle school

- Franklin Avenue Middle School with 377 students in grades 6–8
  - Joseph Keiser, principal

== Administration ==
Core members of the district's administration are:

- Gregorio Maceri, superintendent
- Dina Messery, business administrator and board secretary

== Board of education ==
The district's board of education, comprised of nine members, sets policy and oversees the fiscal and educational operation of the district through its administration. As a Type II school district, the board's trustees are elected directly by voters to serve three-year terms of office on a staggered basis, with three seats up for election each year held (since 2012) as part of the November general election. The board appoints a superintendent to oversee the district's day-to-day operations and a business administrator to supervise the business functions of the district.
