= John Culligan =

American business executive

John W. Culligan (November 22, 1916 in Newark, New Jersey – December 11, 2004 in Franklin Lakes, New Jersey) was an American business executive at American Home Products (now owned by Wyeth), the makers of Advil, Anacin and Preparation H. With a break for service in World War II, Culligan started in AHP's mailroom in 1937, and stayed there through his service as the company's chairman and chief executive from 1981 to 1986.

He was president and CEO of Whitehall Laboratories during the 1960s. As the company's president from 1973 to 1981, Culligan was responsible for the conversion of Advil to an over-the-counter drug. As CEO, he sold off product lines unrelated to medicine and pharmaceuticals, and acquired Ives Laboratories and Sherwood Medical to bolster the core business lines. Culligan stepped down as CEO and was succeeded by John R. Stafford in December 1986, with Culligan remaining as chairman of AHP's executive committee.

== Early life and education ==
He served in the United States Army during World War II.

== Later life ==
Culligan died in his home in Franklin Lakes, New Jersey om December 11, 2004.
