= Gerald L. Storch =

American businessman

Gerald L. Storch is a business executive who has led several large retailers. He is the Founder and CEO of Storch Advisors, a global business and management advisory firm. He is frequently on television as discussing retail and consumer news, including appearing on CNBC, Bloomberg, and Fox Business. Prior to Storch Advisors, he was CEO of HBC, the parent of Saks Fifth Avenue and Hudson's Bay Company. Prior to HBC, Storch was Chairman and CEO of Toys "R" Us, Inc. He also served as Vice Chairman of Target Corporation. He began his career at McKinsey & Company, where he was a partner with specialties in consumer goods and financial services. Storch, a graduate of Harvard College, Harvard Law School, and Harvard Business School, is a member of the Board of Directors of Bristol Myers Squibb and Fanatics, the leading retailer of officially licensed sports merchandise.

He has been a resident of Vero Beach, Florida, Wayzata, Minnesota, and Franklin Lakes, New Jersey.

== Recognition ==
In 2013, AdvisoryCloud ranked Storch as the #1 CEO on their Top Chief Executive List.
