= Van Winkle House (Franklin Lakes, New Jersey) =

Historic house in New Jersey, United States

- U.S. National Register of Historic Places
- New Jersey Register of Historic Places
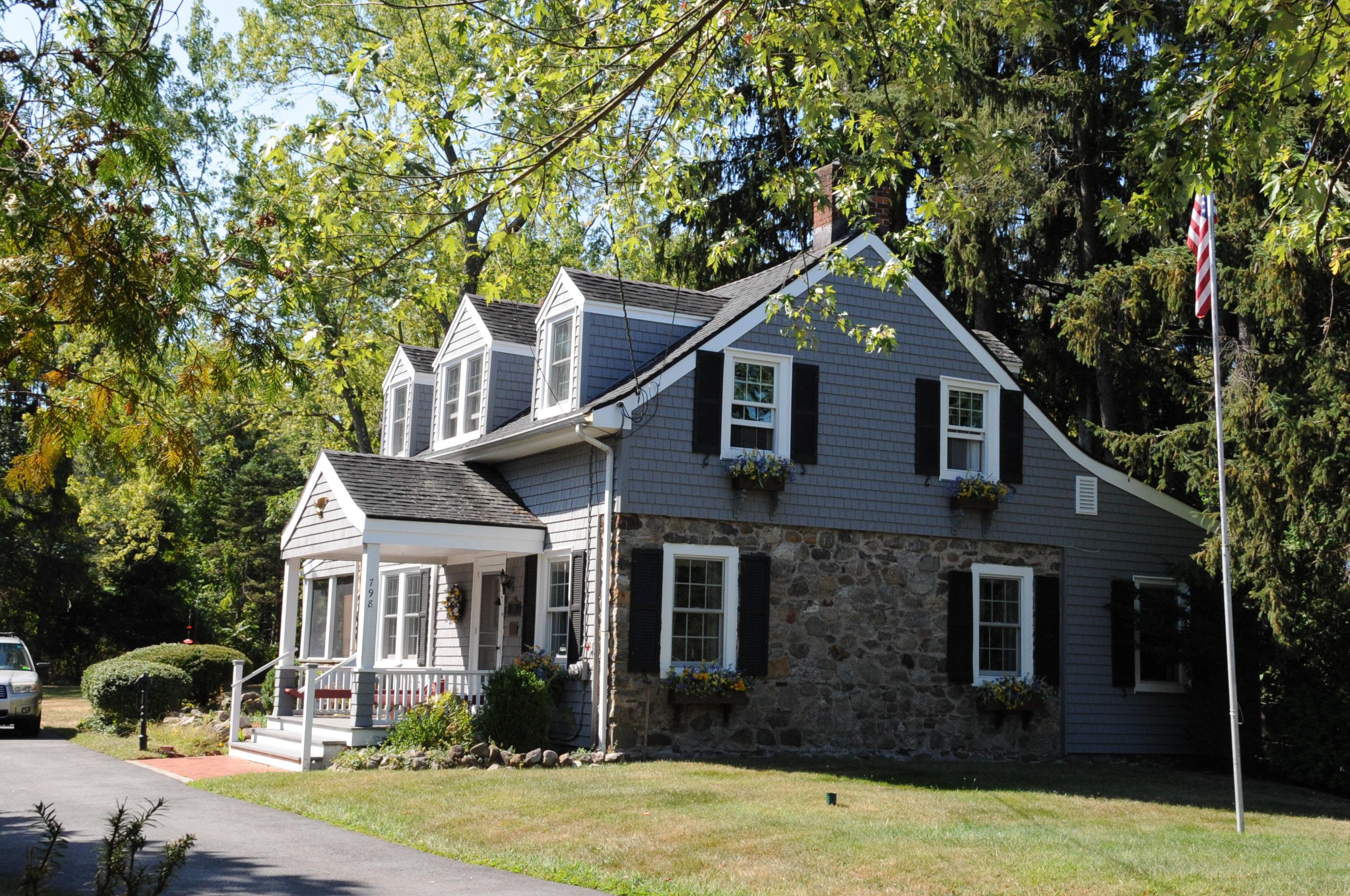

- Location within Bergen County, New Jersey Location within New Jersey Location within the United States
- Location: 798 Franklin Lake Road, Franklin Lakes, New Jersey
- Coordinates: 40°59′35″N 74°12′44″W
- MPS: Stone Houses of Bergen County TR
- NRHP reference No.: 84002595
- NJRHP No.: 509

Significant dates
- Added to NRHP: July 24, 1984
- Designated NJRHP: October 3, 1980

The Van Winkle House is located at 798 Franklin Lake Road in the borough of Franklin Lakes in Bergen County, New Jersey, United States. The historic stone house was added to the National Register of Historic Places on July 24, 1984, for its significance in architecture. It was listed as part of the Early Stone Houses of Bergen County Multiple Property Submission (MPS).

According to the nomination form, the house was likely built by Simeon Van Winkle, a carpenter, sometime before 1761. The 1861 Hopkins–Corey map lists Uriah Riper Van Winkle living here. The house was expanded by a rear addition in 1919.

== See also ==
- National Register of Historic Places listings in Franklin Lakes, New Jersey
- National Register of Historic Places listings in Bergen County, New Jersey
