= Van Houten House (Franklin Lakes, New Jersey) =

United States historic house in New Jersey

- U.S. National Register of Historic Places
- New Jersey Register of Historic Places
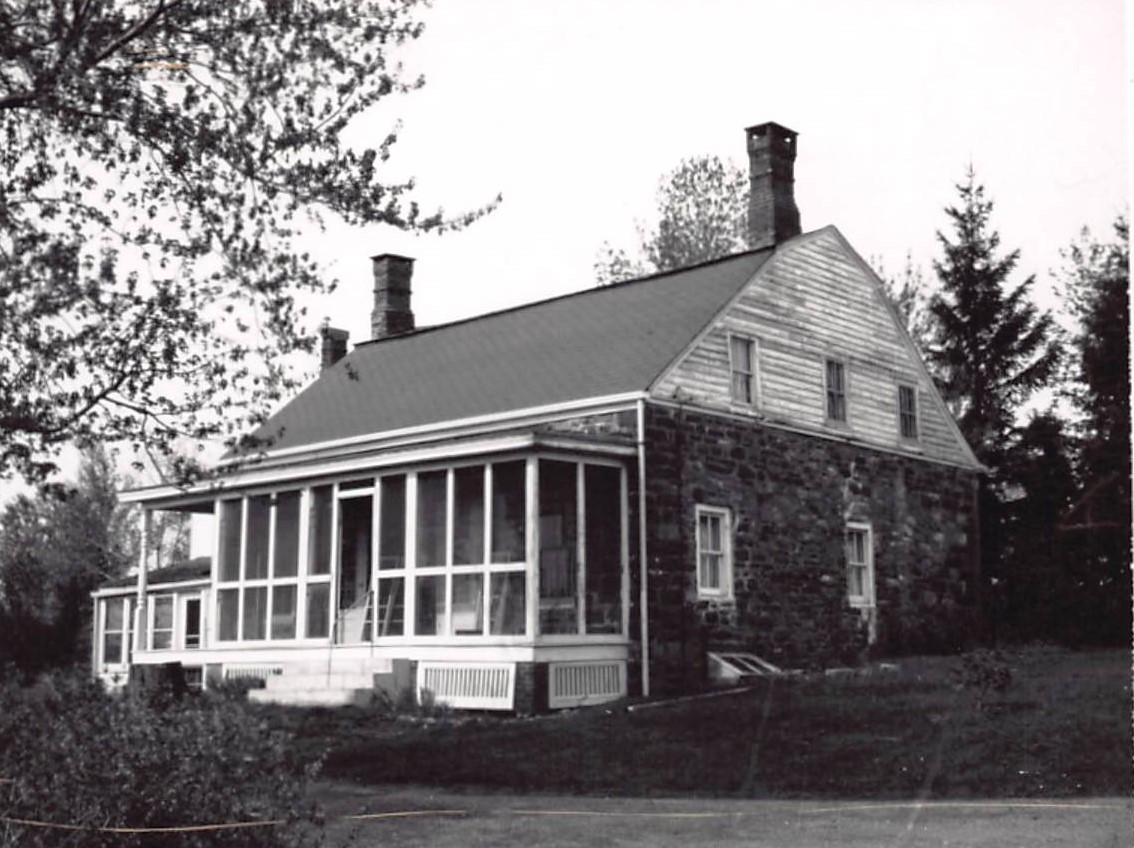

- Location within Bergen County, New Jersey Location within New Jersey Location within the United States
- Location: 778 Vee Drive, Franklin Lakes, New Jersey
- Coordinates: 40°59′33″N 74°11′40″W
- Area: 3.9 acres (1.6 ha)
- MPS: Stone Houses of Bergen County TR
- NRHP reference No.: 83001576
- NJRHP No.: 506

Significant dates
- Added to NRHP: January 9, 1983
- Designated NJRHP: October 3, 1980

The Van Houten House was located at 778 Vee Drive in the borough of Franklin Lakes in Bergen County, New Jersey, United States. The historic stone house was added to the National Register of Historic Places on January 9, 1983, for its significance in architecture and exploration/settlement. It was listed as part of the Early Stone Houses of Bergen County Multiple Property Submission (MPS). The house was built in 1738 by tradition, but around 1779 to 1800 based on architectural evidence. It was demolished January 3, 2001.

== See also ==
- National Register of Historic Places listings in Franklin Lakes, New Jersey
- National Register of Historic Places listings in Bergen County, New Jersey
