= C. Gus Rys =

American politician

Member of the New Jersey General Assembly from the 40th district
- In office January 8, 1974 – January 10, 1978
- Preceded by: District created
- Succeeded by: W. Cary Edwards; Walter M. D. Kern

Member of the New Jersey General Assembly from the 13-C district
- In office January 11, 1972 – January 8, 1974
- Preceded by: William M. Crane; Richard Vander Plaat
- Succeeded by: District eliminated

Personal details
- Born: c. 1912 (Note: The Manual of the State Legislature of New Jersey lists his birthday as June 24, 1913, his gravestone and newspaper obituaries place birth year as 1912, the Social Security Death Index indicates a birthday of June 19, 1911.) Passaic, New Jersey
- Died: August 25, 1980 (aged 68) Hackensack, New Jersey
- Party: Republican
- Spouse: Joyce Yaros
- Children: 3
- Education: New Jersey Law School

C. Gus Rys (c. June 1912 – August 25, 1980) was an American Republican Party politician who served as mayor of Fair Lawn, New Jersey and served in the New Jersey General Assembly.

== Biography ==
Rys was born in Passaic and attended private Catholic schools there. He graduated from East Rutherford High School before attending New Jersey Law School (now part of Rutgers School of Law–Newark). He served on various Republican municipal and Bergen County-wide committees and campaigns prior to and during his time in elected office.

He served in municipal offices, first as a councilman in Fair Lawn for 13 years, as deputy mayor for six years, and mayor for two years. In 1971, he and fellow Republican John A. Spizziri were elected to the New Jersey General Assembly from District 13-C consisting of a snake-like district from Garfield to Wyckoff along the western border of Bergen County, then east to Westwood. For the next election, a new districting scheme was implemented and Rys and Spizziri were reelected to the Assembly from the new 40th district consisting of western Bergen County and subsequently reelected in 1975. While in the Assembly, Rys was known for his opposition to the new income tax implemented in the state that decade. He chose not to seek reelection the Assembly in 1977 and was succeeded by newcomers W. Cary Edwards and Walter M. D. Kern (Spizziri was defeated in the Republican primary that year).

Rys was married to the former Joyce Yaros. They had three children. He died at Hackensack Hospital on August 25, 1980. He is buried at Fair Lawn Memorial Cemetery.
