= Tom Murro =

American journalist

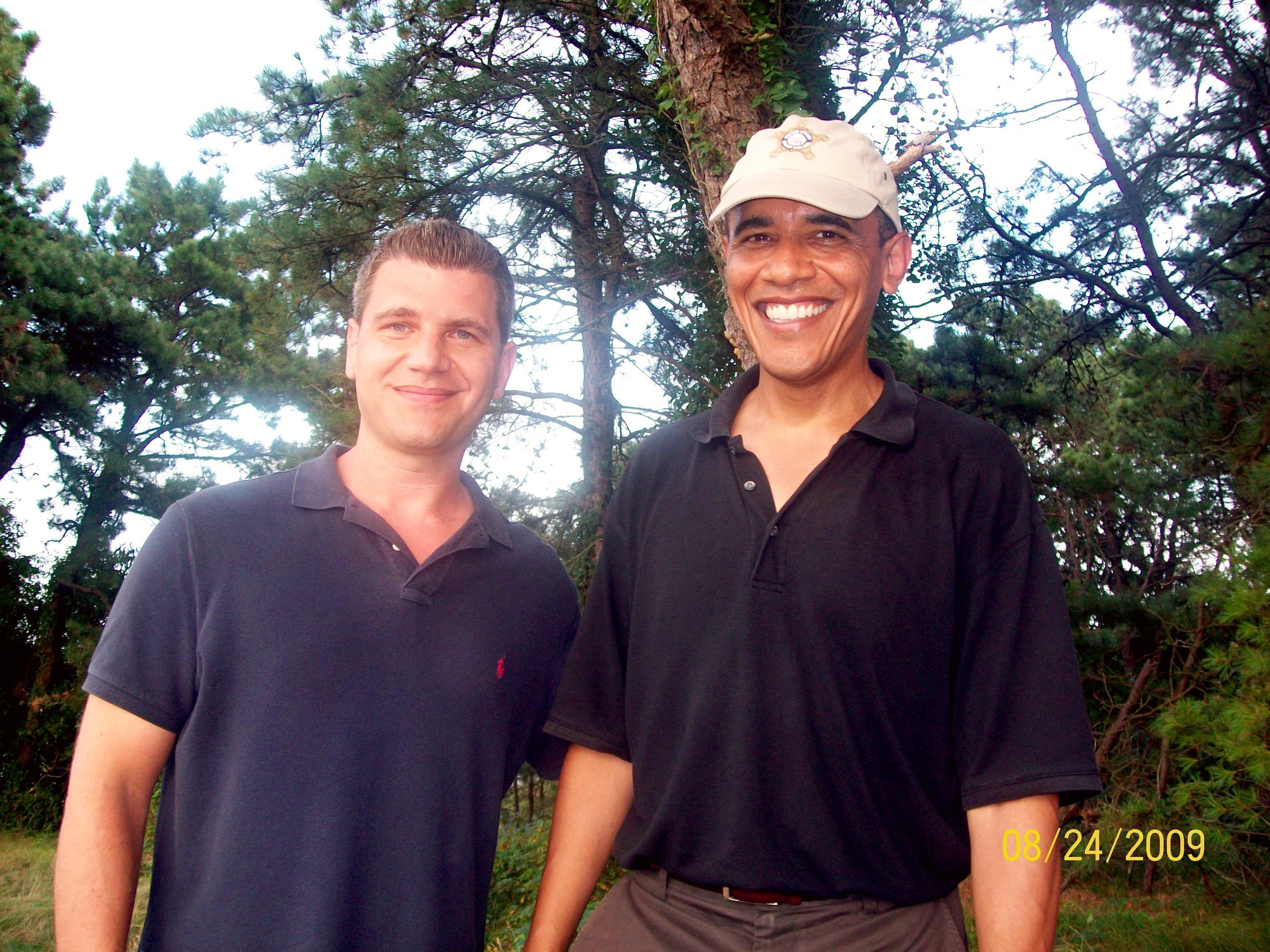
Murro (left), posing with President Barack Obama on Martha's Vineyard, August 2009

Tom Murro is an American journalist and television personality.

== Biography ==
Tom Murro a retired New Jersey banker, is an entertainment reporter for Fox Broadcasting's The Fox Morning Extra and has appeared on the station WTNH-TV and on The Wendy Williams Show. He is also a columnist for The Huffington Post, Chicago Now, the Raleigh Telegram, and Us Weekly, and a contributor to websites including Socialitelife.com, RadarOnline.com and TMZ.com.

Murro and reality-television star Jacqueline Laurita organized a benefit for The Emmanuel Cancer Foundation in Midland Park, New Jersey, for which Pro Football Hall of Famer Harry Carson donated items.

Murro was emcee of the 2011 Mrs. New Jersey United States pageant on May 21, 2011, and co-hosted 2011 New Jersey Fashion Week on October 13, 2011.

Murro acted as guest ringmaster for the Big Apple Circus 36th Holiday Season Benefit Gala in 2014, and again in 2015 with Miss New York 2014 Jillian Tapper.

Murro is a resident of Franklin Lakes, New Jersey.
