= Packer House (Franklin Lakes, New Jersey) =

Historic house in New Jersey, United States

- U.S. National Register of Historic Places
- New Jersey Register of Historic Places
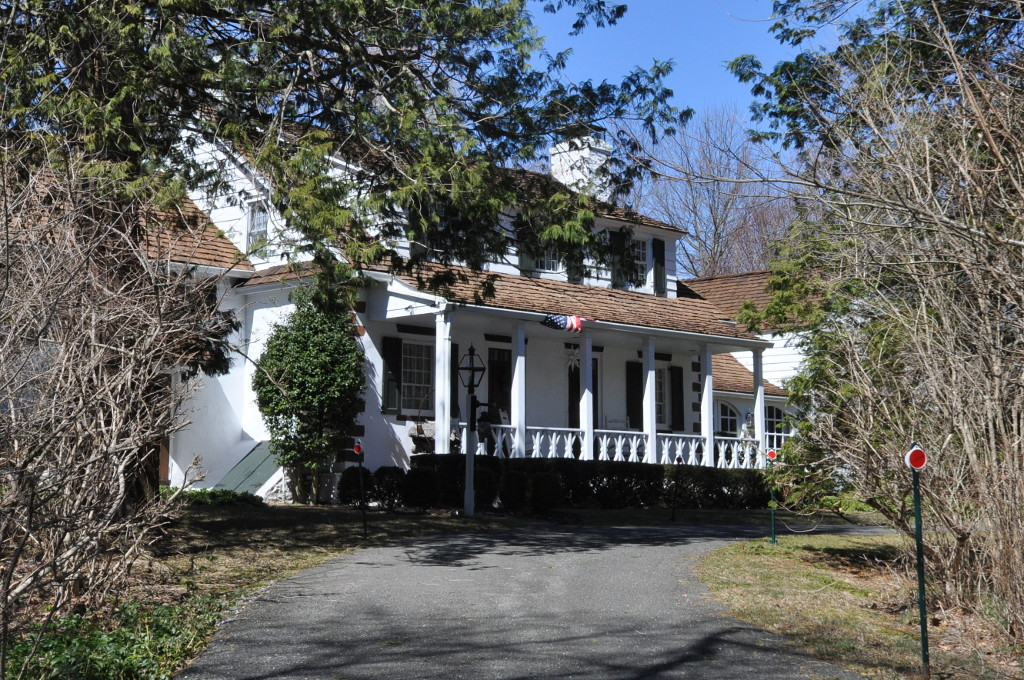
- The Packer House in 2019

- Location within Bergen County, New Jersey Location within New Jersey Location within the United States
- Location: 600 Ewing Avenue, Franklin Lakes, New Jersey
- Coordinates: 41°0′17″N 74°11′43″W
- Area: 4.1 acres (1.7 ha)
- Built: c. 1795
- MPS: Stone Houses of Bergen County TR
- NRHP reference No.: 83001540
- NJRHP No.: 500

Significant dates
- Added to NRHP: January 9, 1983
- Designated NJRHP: October 3, 1980

The William Packer House is located at 600 Ewing Avenue in the borough of Franklin Lakes in Bergen County, New Jersey, United States. The historic stone house was documented by the Historic American Buildings Survey (HABS) in 1939. It was added to the National Register of Historic Places on January 9, 1983, for its significance in architecture. It was listed as part of the Early Stone Houses of Bergen County Multiple Property Submission (MPS). The house is dated to 1789 by tradition, but around 1795 based on architectural evidence.

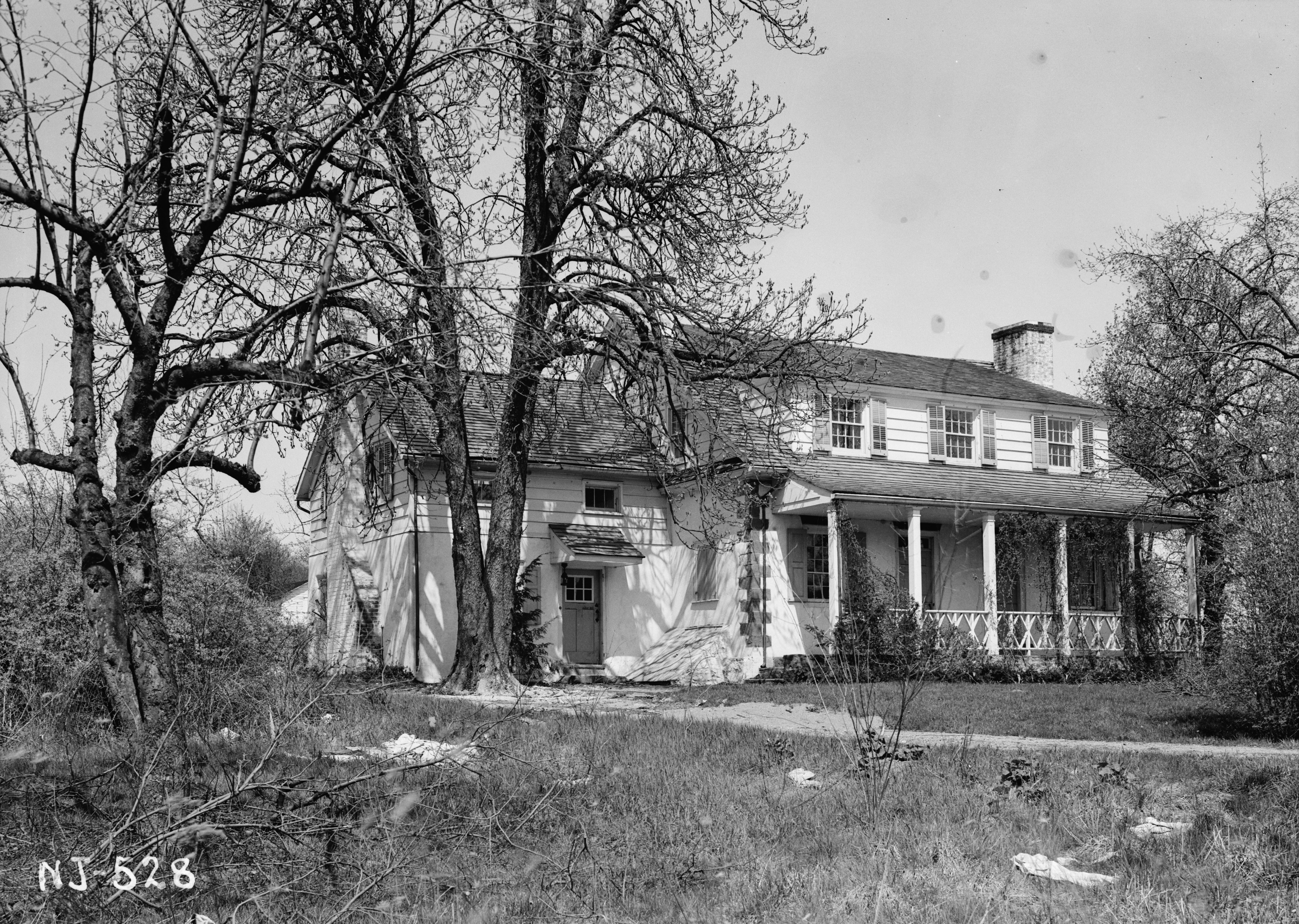
HABS photo from 1939

== See also ==
- National Register of Historic Places listings in Franklin Lakes, New Jersey
- National Register of Historic Places listings in Bergen County, New Jersey
