= Van Houten–Ackerman House (Franklin Lakes, New Jersey) =

United States historic house in New Jersey

- U.S. National Register of Historic Places
- New Jersey Register of Historic Places
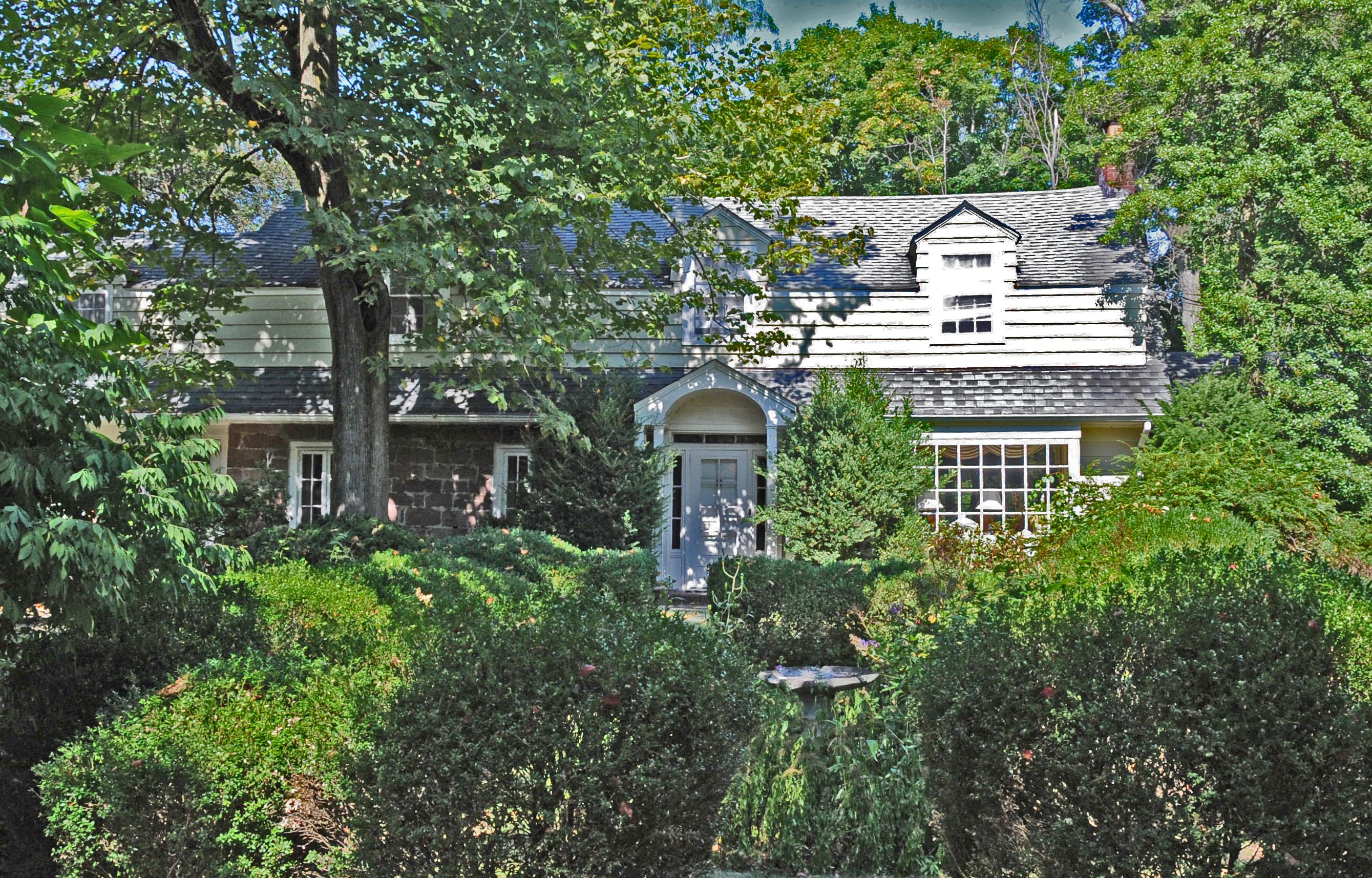

- Location within Bergen County, New Jersey Location within New Jersey Location within the United States
- Location: 1150 Franklin Lake Road, Franklin Lakes, New Jersey
- Coordinates: 40°59′57″N 74°14′33″W
- Area: 2.7 acres (1.1 ha)
- Built: 1768
- MPS: Stone Houses of Bergen County TR
- NRHP reference No.: 83001573
- NJRHP No.: 507

Significant dates
- Added to NRHP: January 9, 1983
- Designated NJRHP: October 3, 1980

The Van Houten–Ackerman House is a historic stone house located at 1150 Franklin Lake Road in the borough of Franklin Lakes in Bergen County, New Jersey, United States. The house was built in 1768 and was added to the National Register of Historic Places on January 9, 1983, for its significance in architecture. It was listed as part of the Early Stone Houses of Bergen County Multiple Property Submission (MPS).

In 1737 Roelef Van Houten purchased 200 acres (81 ha) and deeded it to Jacob Van Houten Jr. in 1761. The house was purchased by John Ackerman in 1854.

== See also ==
- National Register of Historic Places listings in Franklin Lakes, New Jersey
- National Register of Historic Places listings in Bergen County, New Jersey
