= De Gray House =

Historic house in New Jersey, United States

- U.S. National Register of Historic Places
- New Jersey Register of Historic Places
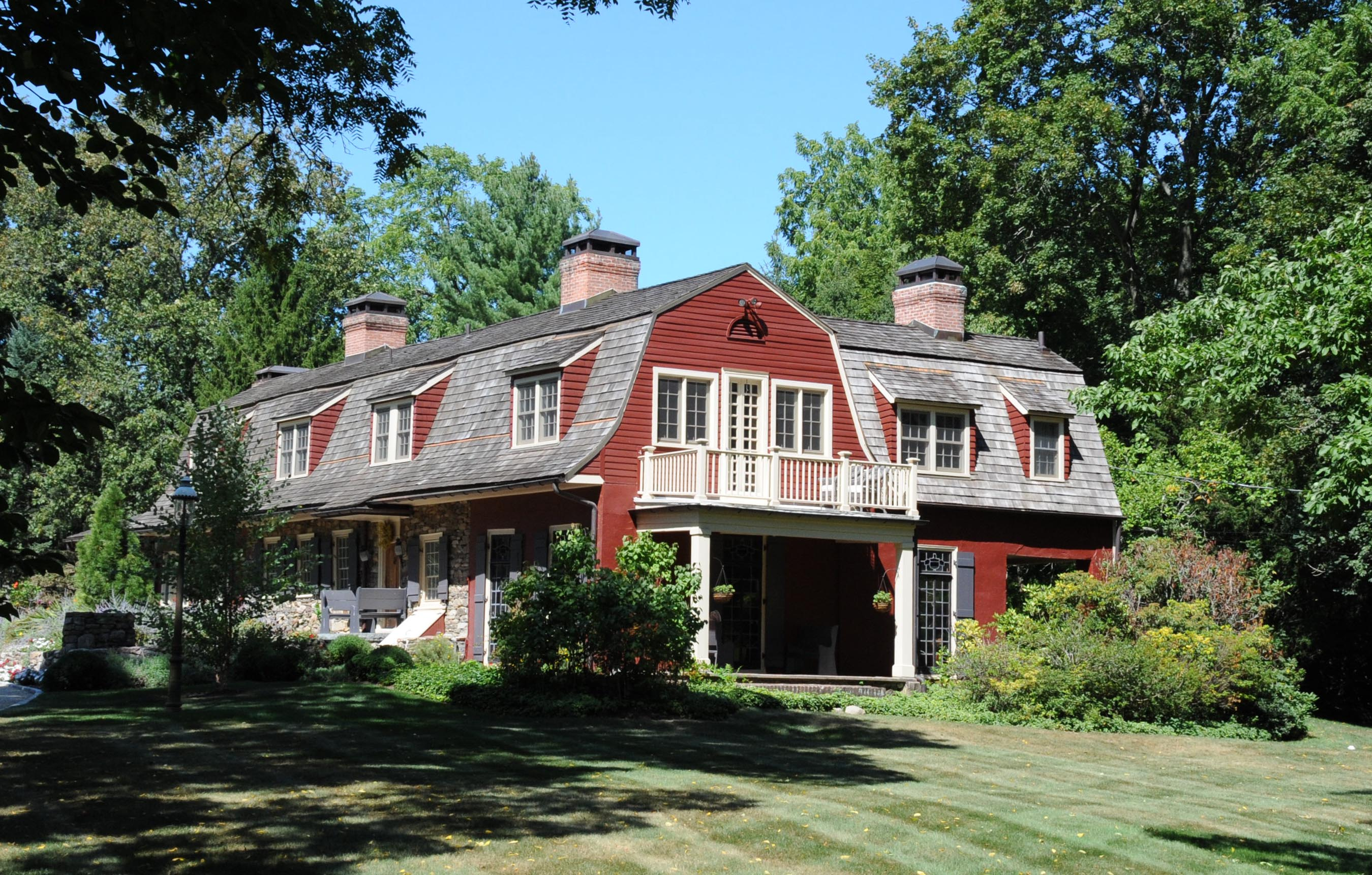

- Location within Bergen County, New Jersey Location within New Jersey Location within the United States
- Location: 650 Ewing Avenue, Franklin Lakes, New Jersey
- Coordinates: 41°0′7″N 74°11′51″W
- Area: 2.7 acres (1.1 ha)
- Built: 1785
- MPS: Stone Houses of Bergen County TR
- NRHP reference No.: 83001489
- NJRHP No.: 497

Significant dates
- Added to NRHP: January 9, 1983
- Designated NJRHP: October 3, 1980

The De Gray House is located at 650 Ewing Avenue in the borough of Franklin Lakes in Bergen County, New Jersey, United States. The historic stone house was built in 1785 and was added to the National Register of Historic Places on January 9, 1983, for its significance in architecture. It was listed as part of the Early Stone Houses of Bergen County Multiple Property Submission (MPS).

According to the nomination form, the house was built by a member of the De Gray or related Geroe families. Daniel De Gray was born here in 1789. His daughter married John Snyder. Their son, William J. Snyder, was born in 1834, and lived here until his death in 1904. The house was then sold to a Philadelphia architect, Charles Merric Gay, in 1906. He enlarged the house and developed the property into the Juglans Farm.

== See also ==
- National Register of Historic Places listings in Franklin Lakes, New Jersey
- National Register of Historic Places listings in Bergen County, New Jersey
