= Franklin Lakes, New Jersey =

Borough in Bergen County, New Jersey, US

- Borough
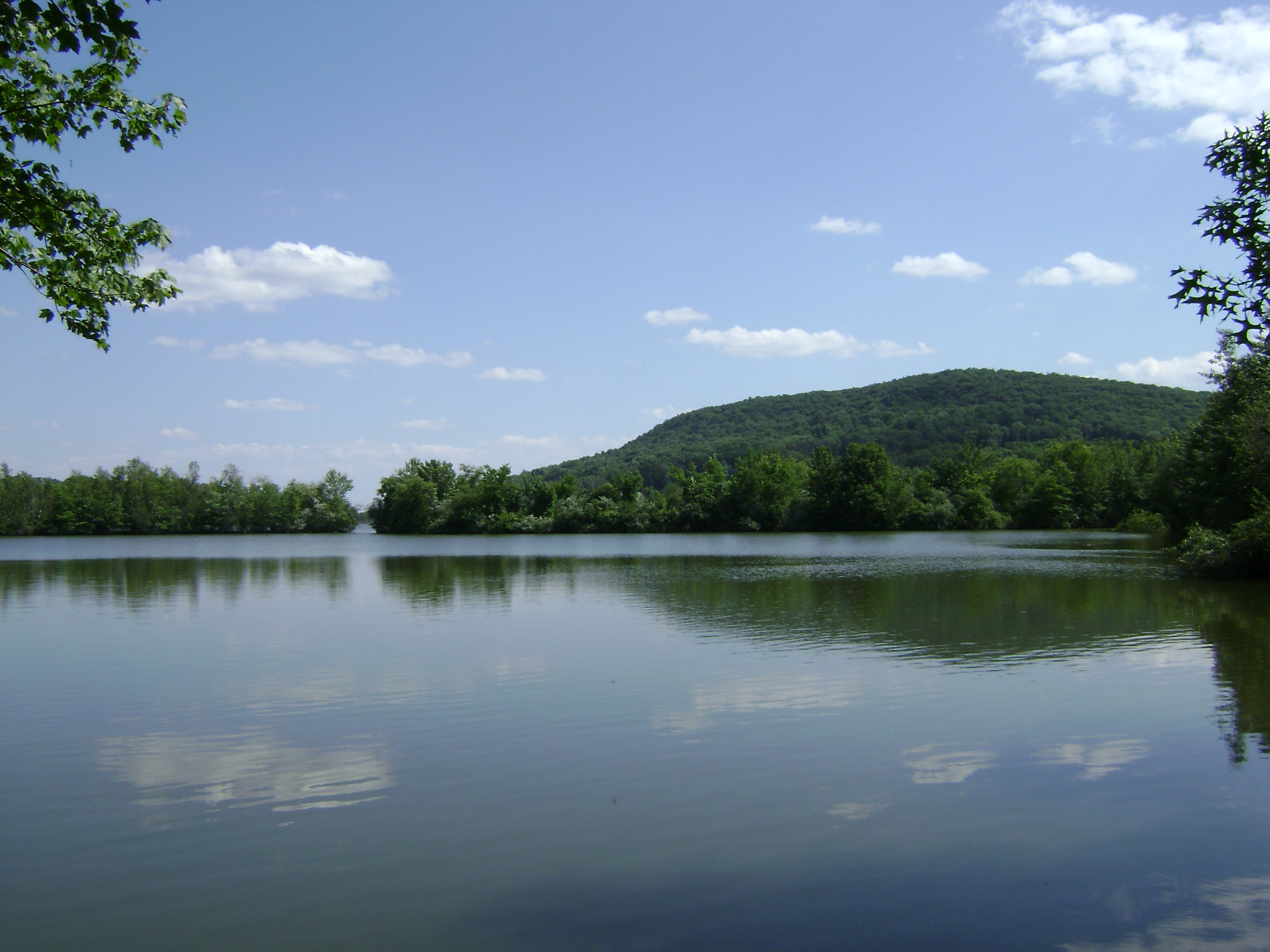
- Franklin Lakes Nature Preserve

- Seal

- Location of Franklin Lakes in Bergen County highlighted in red (left). Inset map: Location of Bergen County in New Jersey highlighted in orange (right).

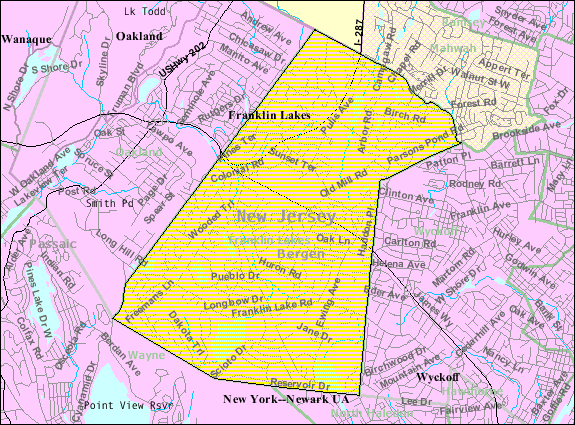
- Census Bureau map of Franklin Lakes, New Jersey

- Location in Bergen County Location in New Jersey Location in the United States
- Coordinates: 41.007526°N 74.205653°W
- Country: United States
- State: New Jersey
- County: Bergen
- Incorporated: March 11, 1922
- Named for: William Franklin

Government
  - Type: Borough
  - Body: Borough Council
  - Mayor: Charles Kahwaty (R, term ends December 31, 2026)
  - Administrator: Gregory C. Hart
  - Municipal clerk: Gail M. Rulli

Area
  - Total: 9.88 sq mi (25.60 km^{2})
  - Land: 9.41 sq mi (24.38 km^{2})
  - Water: 0.47 sq mi (1.21 km^{2}) 4.75%
  - Rank: 212th of 565 in state 3rd of 70 in county
- Elevation: 522 ft (159 m)

Population (2020)
  - Total: 11,079
  - Estimate (2023): 11,021
  - Rank: 225th of 565 in state 34th of 70 in county
  - Density: 1,176.9/sq mi (454.4/km^{2})
  - Rank: 364th of 565 in state 65th of 70 in county
- Time zone: UTC−05:00 (Eastern (EST))
  - Summer (DST): UTC−04:00 (Eastern (EDT))
- ZIP Code: 07417
- Area code: 201
- FIPS code: 3400524990
- GNIS feature ID: 0885225
- Website: www.franklinlakes.org

Franklin Lakes is a borough in Bergen County, in the U.S. state of New Jersey. As of the 2020 United States census, the borough's population was 11,079, an increase of 489 (+4.6%) from the 2010 census count of 10,590, which in turn reflected an increase of 168 (+1.6%) from the 10,422 counted in the 2000 census. Becton Dickinson, a Fortune 500 company, is headquartered in Franklin Lakes.

Franklin Lakes was formed by an act of the New Jersey Legislature on March 11, 1922, from portions of Franklin Township, based on the results of a referendum held on April 11, 1922. The borough was named for William Franklin, the illegitimate son of Benjamin Franklin, a steadfast Loyalist who served as the last colonial governor of New Jersey.

The borough is one of the state's highest-income communities. Based on data from the American Community Survey for 2014–2018, Franklin Lakes residents had a median household income of $159,883, more than double the statewide median. In 2010, Forbes ranked Franklin Lakes at 146th in its listing of "America's Most Expensive ZIP Codes," with a median home price of $1,306,546.

== Geography ==
According to the United States Census Bureau, the borough had a total area of 9.88 square miles (25.60 km^{2}), including 9.41 square miles (24.38 km^{2}) of land and 0.47 square miles (1.21 km^{2}) of water (4.75%).

Unincorporated communities, localities and place names located partially or wholly within the borough include Bakers Pond, Blauvelt Lakes, Campgaw, Crystal Lakes, Ferdinands Mills, Hopper Lake, Pulis Mills and Shadow Lake.

The borough borders the municipalities of Mahwah, Oakland and Wyckoff in Bergen County; and both North Haledon and Wayne in Passaic County.

As of 2026, the borough is a member of Local Leaders for Responsible Planning in order to address the borough's Mount Laurel doctrine-based housing obligations.

== Demographics ==
Historical population
Census	Pop.	Note	%±
1900	375		—
1910	445		18.7%
1920	383		−13.9%
1930	893		133.2%
1940	1,203		34.7%
1950	2,021		68.0%
1960	3,316		64.1%
1970	7,550		127.7%
1980	8,769		16.1%
1990	9,873		12.6%
2000	10,422		5.6%
2010	10,590		1.6%
2020	11,079		4.6%
2023 (est.)	11,021	▼	−0.5%
Population sources: 1930 1900–2020; 2000 2010 2020

=== Racial and ethnic composition ===
Franklin Lakes borough, Bergen County, New Jersey – Racial and ethnic composition Note: the US Census treats Hispanic/Latino as an ethnic category. This table excludes Latinos from the racial categories and assigns them to a separate category. Hispanics/Latinos may be of any race.
Race / Ethnicity (NH = Non-Hispanic)	Pop 2000	Pop 2010	Pop 2020	% 2000	% 2010	% 2020
White alone (NH)	9,285	9,017	8,755	89.09%	85.15%	79.02%
Black or African American alone (NH)	96	136	172	0.92%	1.28%	1.55%
Native American or Alaska Native alone (NH)	10	3	2	0.10%	0.03%	0.02%
Asian alone (NH)	655	777	1,051	6.28%	7.34%	9.49%
Native Hawaiian or Pacific Islander alone (NH)	0	0	3	0.00%	0.00%	0.03%
Other race alone (NH)	12	12	48	0.12%	0.11%	0.43%
Mixed race or Multiracial (NH)	78	120	262	0.75%	1.13%	2.36%
Hispanic or Latino (any race)	286	525	786	2.74%	4.96%	7.09%
Total	10,422	10,590	11,079	100.00%	100.00%	100.00%

=== 2020 census ===
As of the 2020 census, Franklin Lakes had a population of 11,079. The median age was 46.3 years. 22.7% of residents were under the age of 18 and 20.6% were 65 years of age or older. For every 100 females, there were 98.2 males, and for every 100 females age 18 and older, there were 95.8 males.

99.8% of residents lived in urban areas, while 0.2% lived in rural areas.

There were 3,722 households in Franklin Lakes, of which 35.1% had children under the age of 18 living in them. Of all households, 71.5% were married-couple households, 9.8% were households with a male householder and no spouse or partner present, and 16.4% were households with a female householder and no spouse or partner present. About 15.3% of all households were made up of individuals and 9.0% had someone living alone who was 65 years of age or older.

There were 4,051 housing units, of which 8.1% were vacant. The homeowner vacancy rate was 2.4% and the rental vacancy rate was 14.4%.

=== 2010 census ===
The 2010 United States census counted 10,590 people, 3,527 households, and 3,012 families in the borough. The population density was 1,129.1 per square mile (435.9/km^{2}). There were 3,692 housing units at an average density of 393.6 per square mile (152.0/km^{2}). The racial makeup was 88.92% (9,417) White, 1.41% (149) Black or African American, 0.04% (4) Native American, 7.34% (777) Asian, 0.00% (0) Pacific Islander, 0.83% (88) from other races, and 1.46% (155) from two or more races. Hispanic or Latino of any race were 4.96% (525) of the population.

Of the 3,527 households, 40.2% had children under the age of 18; 76.4% were married couples living together; 6.5% had a female householder with no husband present and 14.6% were non-families. Of all households, 12.6% were made up of individuals and 6.8% had someone living alone who was 65 years of age or older. The average household size was 3.00 and the average family size was 3.29.

27.4% of the population were under the age of 18, 6.0% from 18 to 24, 16.7% from 25 to 44, 33.4% from 45 to 64, and 16.4% who were 65 years of age or older. The median age was 44.9 years. For every 100 females, the population had 97.0 males. For every 100 females ages 18 and older there were 93.8 males.

The Census Bureau's 2006–2010 American Community Survey showed that (in 2010 inflation-adjusted dollars) median household income was $151,224 (with a margin of error of +/− $16,426) and the median family income was $155,156 (+/− $33,998). Males had a median income of $125,586 (+/− $20,759) versus $63,170 (+/− $13,069) for females. The per capita income for the borough was $74,219 (+/− $9,917). About 0.7% of families and 1.5% of the population were below the poverty line, including 0.7% of those under age 18 and 1.8% of those age 65 or over.

Same-sex couples headed 28 households in 2010, double the 14 counted in 2000.

=== 2000 census ===
As of the 2000 United States census, there were 10,422 people, 3,322 households, and 2,959 families residing in the borough. The population density was 1,102.5 inhabitants per square mile (425.7/km^{2}). There were 3,395 housing units at an average density of 359.2 per square mile (138.7/km^{2}). The racial makeup of the borough was 91.35% White, 0.92% African American, 0.11% Native American, 6.33% Asian, 0.01% Pacific Islander, 0.41% from other races, and 0.86% from two or more races. Hispanic or Latino people of any race were 2.74% of the population. 29.8% of residents reported being of Italian ancestry in the 2000 Census, the highest percentage recorded as a percentage of borough population.

There were 3,322 households, out of which 43.9% had children under the age of 18 living with them, 82.0% were married couples living together, 4.8% had a female householder with no husband present, and 10.9% were non-families. 8.6% of all households were made up of individuals, and 4.1% had someone living alone who was 65 years of age or older. The average household size was 3.13 and the average family size was 3.34.

In the borough the population was spread out, with 28.7% under the age of 18, 4.9% from 18 to 24, 24.1% from 25 to 44, 31.1% from 45 to 64, and 11.2% who were 65 years of age or older. The median age was 41 years. For every 100 females, there were 97.5 males. For every 100 females age 18 and over, there were 95.7 males.

The median income for a household in the borough was $132,373, and the median income for a family was $142,930. Males had a median income of $97,233 versus $45,588 for females. The per capita income for the borough was $59,763. About 2.6% of families and 3.2% of the population were below the poverty line, including 3.1% of those under age 18 and 6.8% of those age 65 or over.

== Economy ==
Franklin Lakes hosts the corporate headquarters of Becton Dickinson, the medical technology firm founded in 1897. Medco Health Solutions, a leading pharmacy benefit manager (PBM), was based here until it was acquired by Express Scripts, another PBM, in 2012.

== Popular culture ==
Franklin Lakes has been the setting of several reality television shows, including: Bravo network's series The Real Housewives of New Jersey, MTV's My Super Sweet 16, and VH1's My Big Fat Fabulous Wedding. Franklin Lakes was also used for filming the fictional upstate New York town of Dargerville in the Law & Order episode "Knock-Off".

== Government ==
=== Local government ===
Franklin Lakes is governed under the borough form of New Jersey municipal government, which is used in 218 municipalities (of the 564) statewide, making it the most common form of government in New Jersey. The governing body is comprised of a mayor and a borough council, with all positions elected at-large on a partisan basis as part of the November general election. A mayor is elected directly by the voters to a four-year term of office. The borough council includes six members elected to serve three-year terms on a staggered basis, with two seats coming up for election each year in a three-year cycle. The borough form of government used by Franklin Lakes is a "weak mayor / strong council" government in which council members act as the legislative body with the mayor presiding at meetings and voting only in the event of a tie. The mayor can veto ordinances subject to an override by a two-thirds majority vote of the council. The mayor makes committee and liaison assignments for council members, and most appointments are made by the mayor with the advice and consent of the council. All council meetings are held at the Borough Hall located on DeKorte Drive, formerly Municipal Drive.

As of 2024, the mayor of Franklin Lakes is Republican Charles J. X. Kahwaty, whose term of office ends on December 31, 2026. Members of the Franklin Lakes Borough Council are Council President Gary H. Sheppard (R, 2026), Joel Ansh (R, 2025), Ardith Cardenas (R, 2025), Michelle M. DeLuccia (R, 2024; elected to serve an unexpired term), Gail A. Kelly (R, 2026) and Thomas G. Lambrix (R, 2024).

In July 2021, the borough council chose Susan McGowan to fill the seat expiring in December 2022 that had been held by Dennis Bonagura until resigned from office after the council implemented a nepotism policy that would impact the possibility that his son could have been hired by the borough as a police officer. Bonagura ran for office again in November 2021 and was elected to serve the balance of his own unexpired term.

The borough administrator is Gregory C. Hart.

==== Emergency services ====
The Franklin Lakes Police Department is headed by Chief Mark McCombs.

The Franklin Lakes Fire Department is an all-volunteer fire department, founded in 1924. The FLFD has two locations, one known as "Headquarters" which is located off of Franklin Avenue, and the other is the "Southside" Firehouse, located on Franklin Lakes Road. The current chief of the FLFD is Chuck Bohny.

The Franklin Lakes Office of Emergency Management is located at 745 Franklin Avenue. The current Emergency Management Coordinator is Joe Barcelo.

=== Federal, state, and county representation ===
Franklin Lakes is located in the 9th congressional district and is part of New Jersey's 40th legislative district.

For the 119th United States Congress, New Jersey's 9th congressional district is represented by Nellie Pou (D, North Haledon) New Jersey is represented in the United States Senate by Democrats Cory Booker (Newark, term ends 2027) and Andy Kim (Moorestown, term ends 2031).

For the 2026–2027 session, the 40th legislative district of the New Jersey Legislature is represented in the State Senate by Kristin Corrado (R, Totowa) and in the General Assembly by Al Barlas (R, Cedar Grove) and Christopher DePhillips (R, Wyckoff).

Bergen County is governed by a directly elected County Executive, with legislative functions performed by a Board of County Commissioners comprised of seven members who are elected at-large to three-year terms in partisan elections on a staggered basis, with either two or three seats coming up for election each November; a Chairman and Vice Chairman are selected from among its seven members at a reorganization meeting held every January. As of 2025, the county executive is James J. Tedesco III (D, Paramus), whose four-year term of office ends December 31, 2026.

Bergen County's Commissioners are Chair Mary J. Amoroso (D, Mahwah, 2025), Vice Chair Steven A. Tanelli (D, North Arlington, 2027), Chair Pro Tem Joan Voss (D, Fort Lee, 2026), Rafael Marte (D, Bergenfield, 2026), Germaine M. Ortiz (D, Emerson, 2025), Thomas J. Sullivan Jr. (D, Montvale, 2025) and Tracy Silna Zur (D, Franklin Lakes, 2027).

Bergen County's elected constitutional officials are Clerk John S. Hogan (D, Northvale, 2026), Sheriff Anthony Cureton (D, Englewood, 2027) and Surrogate Michael R. Dressler (D, Cresskill, 2026).

=== Politics ===
As of March 2011, there was a total of 7,446 registered voters in Franklin Lakes, of whom 1,141 (15.3% vs. 31.7% countywide) were registered as Democrats, 3,307 (44.4% vs. 21.1%) were registered as Republicans, and 2,986 (40.1% vs. 47.1%) were registered as unaffiliated. There were 12 voters registered as Libertarians or Greens. Among the borough's 2010 Census population, 70.3% (vs. 57.1% in Bergen County) were registered to vote, including 96.8% of those ages 18 and over (vs. 73.7% countywide).

Gubernatorial election results for Franklin Lakes
Year	Republican		Democratic		Third party(ies)	
Year	No.	%	No.	%	No.	%
2025	3,553	65.72%	1,846	34.15%	7	0.13%
2021	3,108	69.13%	1,377	30.63%	11	0.24%
2017	1,908	66.41%	937	32.61%	28	0.97%
2013	2,697	81.63%	587	17.77%	20	0.61%
2009	2,739	70.43%	1,023	26.30%	127	3.27%
2005	2,307	66.29%	1,121	32.21%	52	1.49%

In the 2016 presidential election, Republican Donald Trump received 3,721 votes (61.2% vs. 41.1% countywide), ahead of Democrat Hillary Clinton with 2,153 votes (35.4% vs. 54.2%) and other candidates with 202 votes (3.3% vs. 4.6%), among the 6,131 ballots cast by the borough's 8,367 registered voters, for a turnout of 73.3% (vs. 72.5% in Bergen County). In the 2012 presidential election, Republican Mitt Romney received 3,910 votes (69.6% vs. 43.5% countywide), ahead of Democrat Barack Obama with 1,601 votes (28.5% vs. 54.8%) and other candidates with 44 votes (0.8% vs. 0.9%), among the 5,614 ballots cast by the borough's 7,881 registered voters, for a turnout of 71.2% (vs. 70.4% in Bergen County). In the 2008 presidential election, Republican John McCain received 3,818 votes (62.6% vs. 44.5% countywide), ahead of Democrat Barack Obama with 2,206 votes (36.2% vs. 53.9%) and other candidates with 29 votes (0.5% vs. 0.8%), among the 6,095 ballots cast by the borough's 7,698 registered voters, for a turnout of 79.2% (vs. 76.8% in Bergen County). In the 2004 presidential election, Republican George W. Bush received 3,819 votes (65.9% vs. 47.2% countywide), ahead of Democrat John Kerry with 1,923 votes (33.2% vs. 51.7%) and other candidates with 32 votes (0.6% vs. 0.7%), among the 5,792 ballots cast by the borough's 7,251 registered voters, for a turnout of 79.9% (vs. 76.9% in the whole county).

Presidential elections results
Year	Republican	Democratic
2024	62.2% 4,341	34.3% 2,395
2020	57.9% 4,375	40.7% 3,073
2016	61.2% 3,721	35.4% 2,153
2012	69.6% 3,910	28.5% 1,601
2008	62.6% 3,818	36.2% 2,206
2004	65.9% 3,819	33.2% 1,923

In the 2013 gubernatorial election, Republican Chris Christie received 81.6% of the vote (2,697 cast), ahead of Democrat Barbara Buono with 17.8% (587 votes), and other candidates with 0.6% (20 votes), among the 3,360 ballots cast by the borough's 7,580 registered voters (56 ballots were spoiled), for a turnout of 44.3%. In the 2009 gubernatorial election, Republican Chris Christie received 2,739 votes (69.9% vs. 45.8% countywide), ahead of Democrat Jon Corzine with 1,023 votes (26.1% vs. 48.0%), Independent Chris Daggett with 110 votes (2.8% vs. 4.7%) and other candidates with 17 votes (0.4% vs. 0.5%), among the 3,918 ballots cast by the borough's 7,564 registered voters, yielding a 51.8% turnout (vs. 50.0% in the county).

United States Senate election results for Franklin Lakes1
Year	Republican		Democratic		Third party(ies)	
Year	No.	%	No.	%	No.	%
2024	4,289	63.92%	2,261	33.70%	160	2.38%
2018	2,877	66.72%	1,354	31.40%	81	1.88%
2012	3,489	68.63%	1,541	30.31%	54	1.06%
2006	2,595	67.09%	1,250	32.32%	23	0.59%

United States Senate election results for Franklin Lakes2
Year	Republican		Democratic		Third party(ies)	
Year	No.	%	No.	%	No.	%
2020	4,492	60.79%	2,836	38.38%	61	0.83%
2014	2,172	67.66%	1,014	31.59%	24	0.75%
2013	1,491	68.87%	669	30.90%	5	0.23%
2008	3,657	65.29%	1,906	34.03%	38	0.68%

== Education ==
Students in pre-kindergarten through eighth grade attend the Franklin Lakes Public Schools. As of the 2023–24 school year, the district, comprised of four schools, had an enrollment of 1,200 students and 144.1 classroom teachers (on an FTE basis), for a student–teacher ratio of 8.3:1. Schools in the district (with 2023–24 enrollment data from the National Center for Education Statistics) are Colonial Road School with 246 students in grades PreK–5, High Mountain Road School with 297 students in grades PreK–5, Woodside Avenue School with 281 students in grades K–5 and Franklin Avenue Middle School with 377 students in grades 6–8.

Students in public school for ninth through twelfth grades attend the schools of the Ramapo Indian Hills Regional High School District, a regional district consisting of two four-year public high schools serving students from Franklin Lakes, Oakland and Wyckoff. Before enrolling, students have the option to choose to attend either of the district's high schools. Schools in the high school district (with 2023–24 enrollment data from the National Center for Education Statistics) are Indian Hills High School, located in Oakland (694 students) and Ramapo High School, located in Franklin Lakes (1,188 students). The district's nine-member board of education oversees the operation of the district; seats on the board are allocated based on population, with two of the nine seats allocated to Franklin Lakes.

Prior to the formation of the regional high school district, students from Franklin Lakes and Wyckoff had attended Ramsey High School as part of a sending/receiving relationship, until the Ramsey Public School District informed officials from the two communities that the Ramsey school would no longer have space to accommodate out-of-district students after the 1956–1957 school year. Franklin Lakes, Oakland and Wyckoff (FLOW district) approved the creation of a regional high school in 1954 by a vote of 1,060 to 51, with Ramapo High School (in Franklin Lakes) opening in 1957 and Indian Hills High School in 1960.

Public school students from the borough, and all of Bergen County, are eligible to attend the secondary education programs offered by the Bergen County Technical Schools, which include the Bergen County Academies in Hackensack, and the Bergen Tech campus in Teterboro or Paramus. The district offers programs on a shared-time or full-time basis, with admission based on a selective application process and tuition covered by the student's home school district.

Academy of the Most Blessed Sacrament is a K–8 elementary school that operates under the auspices of the Roman Catholic Diocese of Newark. In 2016, the school was one of ten schools in New Jersey, and one of four non-public school in the state, recognized as a National Blue Ribbon School by the United States Department of Education.

== Transportation ==
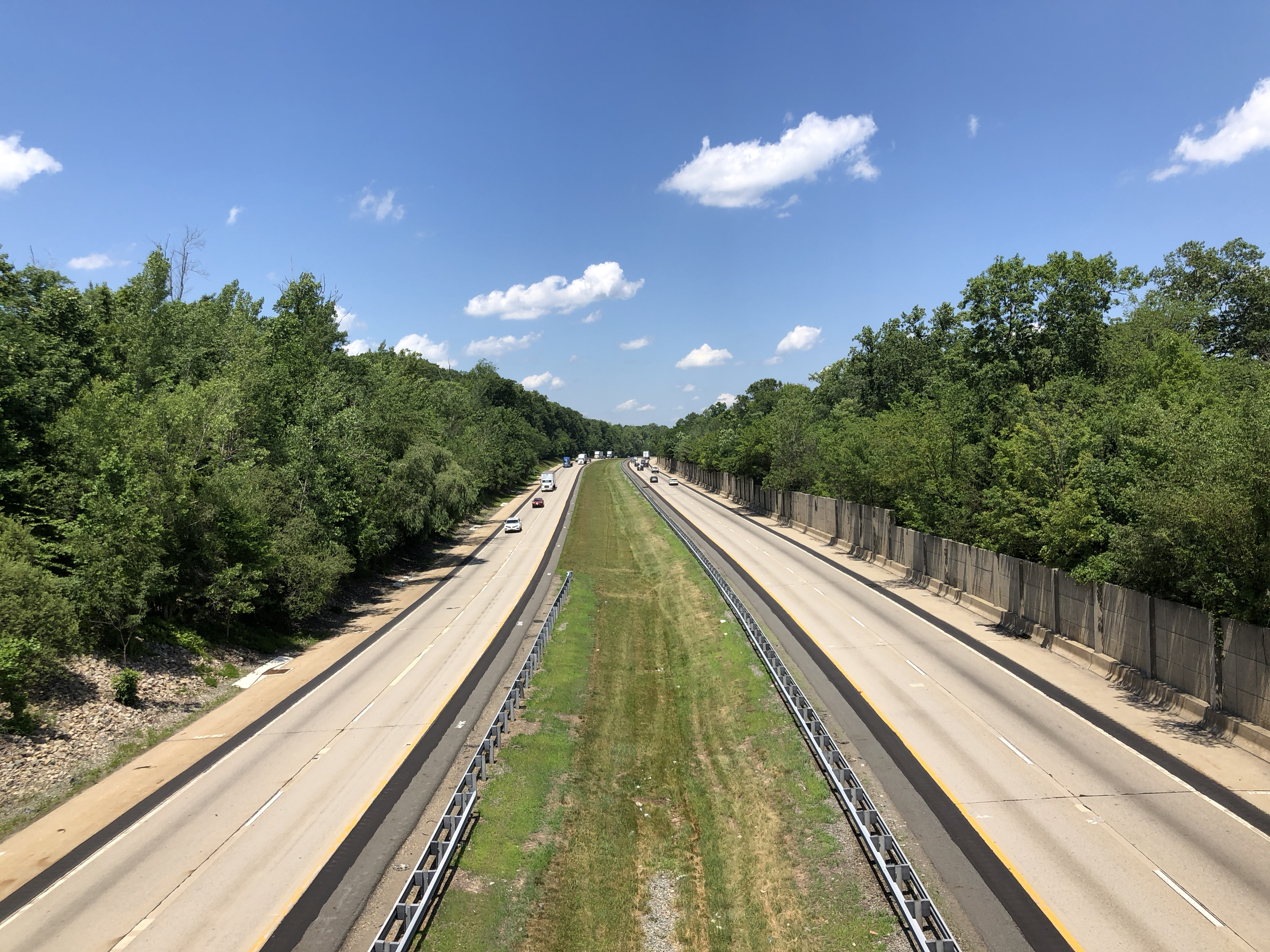
Interstate 287 northbound in Franklin Lakes

=== Roads and highways ===
As of May 2010, the borough had a total of 92.97 miles (149.62 km) of roadways, of which 71.64 miles (115.29 km) were maintained by the municipality, 16.75 miles (26.96 km) by Bergen County, and 4.58 miles (7.37 km) by the New Jersey Department of Transportation.

Route 208 runs for 2.2 miles (3.5 km) across the borough's midsection, from Wyckoff to its western terminus at its intersection with Interstate 287 in Oakland. Interstate 287 enters on the borough's western border with Oakland and heads north towards Mahwah, with the highway's exit 59 in the borough. County Route 502 (Breakneck Road / Franklin Lakes Road) enters from Wayne Township in Passaic County at the borough's southwest corner, runs along the border with Oakland and re-enters Franklin Lakes, heading north towards Wyckoff.

=== Public transportation ===
NJ Transit bus route 752 serves Franklin Lakes, providing local service.

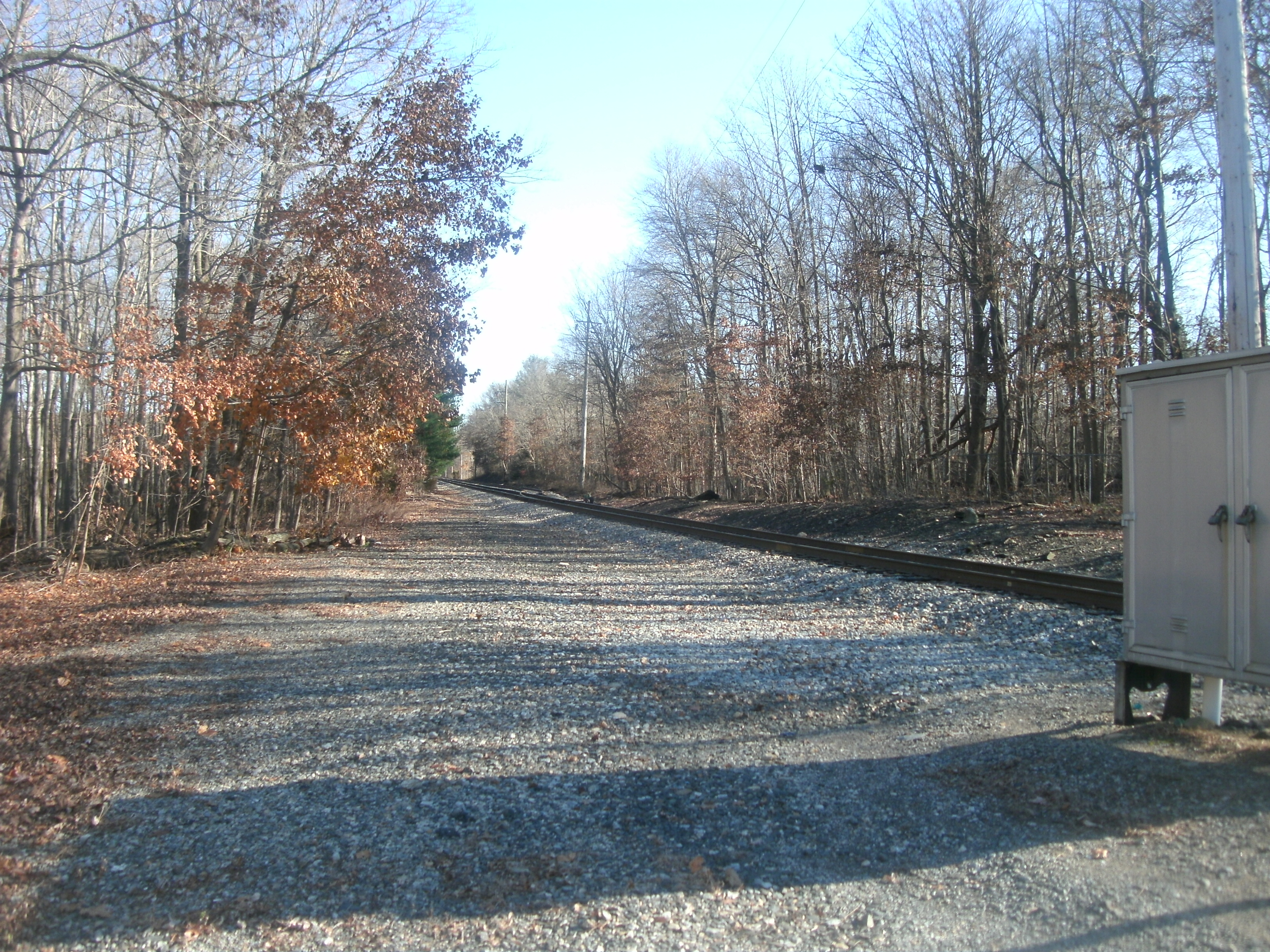
The former Campgaw Station site for the New York, Susquehanna and Western Railway as seen in November 2011. There is nothing left of the station platform or depot.

From the late 1800s until 1966, Franklin Lakes had passenger train service at the Crystal Lakes and Campgaw stations on the New York, Susquehanna and Western Railway.

== Notable people ==
People who were born in, residents of, or otherwise closely associated with Franklin Lakes include:

- Noelle Bassi (born 1983), butterfly swimmer who won the silver medal in the women's 200m butterfly event at the 2003 Pan American Games
- John Calipari (born 1959), NBA and college basketball coach
- Cindy Callaghan (born c. 1976), author of children's books whose first book, Just Add Magic, was adapted into an Amazon television series by the same name
- Dina Cantin (born 1972), cast member on the reality television series The Real Housewives of New Jersey
- Harry Carson (born 1953), Pro Football Hall of Fame linebacker who played for the New York Giants; co-host of Fox's Giants Game Plan
- Derrick Coleman (born 1967), former NBA player who played for the New Jersey Nets
- Blake Costanzo (born 1984), football player
- John Culligan (1916–2004), former CEO of American Home Products (later Wyeth, now Pfizer)
- Richard W. DeKorte (1936–1975), former mayor of Franklin Lakes who served as a member of the New Jersey General Assembly
- Kirk DeMicco (born 1969), screenwriter, director and producer, best known for writing and directing Space Chimps and The Croods
- William W. Evans Jr. (1921–1999), politician who served in the New Jersey General Assembly from 1960 to 1962 and was a candidate for the Republican nomination for president in 1968
- Dwight Gooden (born 1964), former MLB pitcher for the New York Mets
- Melissa Gorga (born 1979), reality television personality and singer; featured as one of The Real Housewives of New Jersey
- Dan Grunfeld (born 1984), professional basketball player
- Ernie Grunfeld (born 1955), former NBA player and general manager
- Dylan Harper (born 2006), basketball player selected second overall in the 2025 NBA draft by the San Antonio Spurs after playing for the Rutgers Scarlet Knights
- Ron Harper Jr. (born 2000), college basketball player for the Rutgers Scarlet Knights
- Morgan Hoffmann (born 1989), professional golfer
- Sam Huff (1934–2021), former linebacker and game day radio color commentator for the Washington Redskins, inducted into the Pro Football Hall of Fame
- Michael Jackson (1958–2009), singer, lived in Franklin Lakes during 2007
- Janet Jacobs (1928–2017), shortstop and center fielder who played in the All-American Girls Professional Baseball League
- Tommy John (born 1943), All-Star pitcher who lived in Franklin Lakes while with the New York Yankees
- Carolyn Kaelin (1961–2015), cancer surgeon at the Dana–Farber Cancer Institute who founded the Comprehensive Breast Health Center at Brigham and Women's Hospital in 1995
- Tanya Kalyvas (born 1979), former footballer who played as a midfielder for the Greece women's national team
- Bernard Kerik (born 1955), former New York City Police Commissioner
- Grace Kim (born 1968), former professional tennis player
- Bernard King (born 1956), former player for the New Jersey Nets
- Ross Krautman (born 1991), placekicker for the Syracuse Orange football team
- Jacqueline Laurita (born 1970), cast member on the reality television series The Real Housewives of New Jersey
- Matt LoVecchio (born 1982), starting quarterback for the University of Notre Dame football team 2000–2001, and for Indiana University 2003–2004
- Caroline Manzo (born 1961), cast member on the reality television series The Real Housewives of New Jersey
- Billy McLaughlin (born 1995), served as Director of Digital Content for the White House during the second administration of President Donald J. Trump
- Gheorghe Mureșan (born 1971), former professional basketball player; at 7'7" (2.31 m), arguably the tallest man to ever play in the NBA
- Tom Murro (born 1966), journalist, columnist, television personality
- Willie Randolph (born 1954), former MLB player and manager for the New York Mets
- Kelly Ripa (born 1970), actress and talk show host
- Chris Simms (born 1980), former NFL quarterback
- Matt Simms (born 1988), NFL quarterback who plays for the New York Jets
- Phil Simms (born 1954), former New York Giants quarterback, football commentator
- John A. Spizziri (born 1934), politician, served in the New Jersey General Assembly 1972–1978
- Gerald L. Storch (born 1956), former CEO of Toys "R" Us
- James "J.T." Taylor (born 1953), singer-songwriter/producer of Kool & the Gang
- Justin Trattou (born 1988), defensive end who has played in the NFL for the New York Giants and Minnesota Vikings
- Keith Van Horn (born 1975), former NBA player who lived in Franklin Lakes during his time with the New Jersey Nets
- Stuart Varney (born 1949), economics journalist
- Kaavya Viswanathan (born 1987), novelist noted for highly publicized plagiarism scandal
- Jack Wallace (born 1998), ice sled hockey player who was a member of the gold medal-winning US team in Para ice hockey at the 2018 Winter Paralympics
- Jane Wyatt (1910–2006), actress known for her role in Father Knows Best; born in Campgaw but raised in New York City
- Jeremy Zucker (born 1996), singer-songwriter best known for his song "Comethru", which has accumulated over 200 million streams on Spotify

== Historic sites ==
Franklin Lakes is home to the following locations on the National Register of Historic Places:

- Ackerman–Boyd House – 1095 Franklin Lake Road (added 1983)
- Blauvelt House – 205 Woodside Avenue (added 1985)
- De Gray House – 650 Ewing Avenue (added 1983)
- Packer House – 600 Ewing Avenue (added 1983)
- Albert Pulis House – 322 Pulis Avenue (added 1983)
- Reaction Motors Rocket Test Facility – 936 Dogwood Trail (added 1979)
- Storms House – 1069 Franklin Lake Road (added 1984)
- Van Blarcom House – 834 Franklin Lake Road (added 1984)
- Van Houten House – 778 Vee Drive (added 1983)
- Van Houten–Ackerman House – 1150 Franklin Lake Road (added 1983)
- Van Koert–Winters House – 615 Franklin Avenue (added 1984)
- Van Winkle House – 798 Franklin Lake Road (added 1984)
- Aaron Winters House – 358 Woodside Avenue (added 1984)
- Winters–Courter House – 831 Circle Avenue (added 1983)

== Sources ==
- Municipal Incorporations of the State of New Jersey (according to Counties) prepared by the Division of Local Government, Department of the Treasury (New Jersey); December 1, 1958.
- Clayton, W. Woodford; and Nelson, Nelson. History of Bergen and Passaic Counties, New Jersey, with Biographical Sketches of Many of its Pioneers and Prominent Men. Philadelphia: Everts and Peck, 1882.
- Harvey, Cornelius Burnham (ed.), Genealogical History of Hudson and Bergen Counties, New Jersey. New York: New Jersey Genealogical Publishing Co., 1900.
- Van Valen, James M. History of Bergen County, New Jersey. New York: New Jersey Publishing and Engraving Co., 1900.
- Westervelt, Frances A. (Frances Augusta), 1858–1942, History of Bergen County, New Jersey, 1630–1923, Lewis Historical Publishing Company, 1923.
