= Van Koert–Winters House =

Historic house in New Jersey, United States

- U.S. National Register of Historic Places
- New Jersey Register of Historic Places
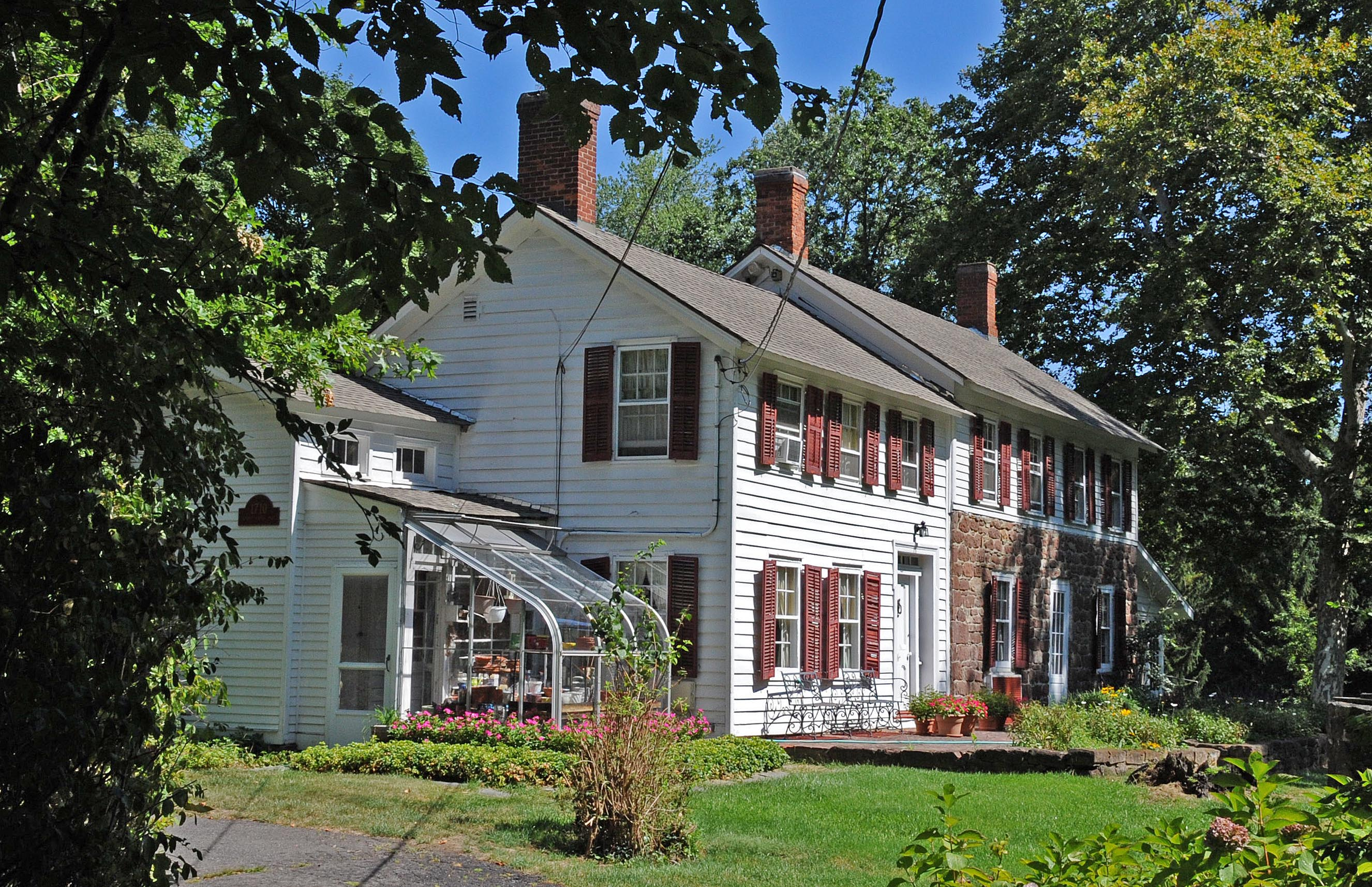

- Location within Bergen County, New Jersey Location within New Jersey Location within the United States
- Location: 615 Franklin Avenue, Franklin Lakes, New Jersey
- Coordinates: 41°0′48″N 74°11′45″W
- Area: 23.7 acres (9.6 ha)
- MPS: Stone Houses of Bergen County TR
- NRHP reference No.: 84002593
- NJRHP No.: 508

Significant dates
- Added to NRHP: July 24, 1984
- Designated NJRHP: October 3, 1980

The Van Koert–Winters House is located at 615 Franklin Avenue in the borough of Franklin Lakes in Bergen County, New Jersey, United States. The historic stone house was added to the National Register of Historic Places on July 24, 1984, for its significance in architecture and exploration/settlement. It was listed as part of the Early Stone Houses of Bergen County Multiple Property Submission (MPS).

The stone part of the house was probably built by Arie Van Koert family sometime before the American Revolutionary War. It was owned by Daniel C. Winters by 1861.

== See also ==
- National Register of Historic Places listings in Franklin Lakes, New Jersey
- National Register of Historic Places listings in Bergen County, New Jersey
