= Van Blarcom–Jardine House =

Historic house in New Jersey, United States

- U.S. National Register of Historic Places
- New Jersey Register of Historic Places
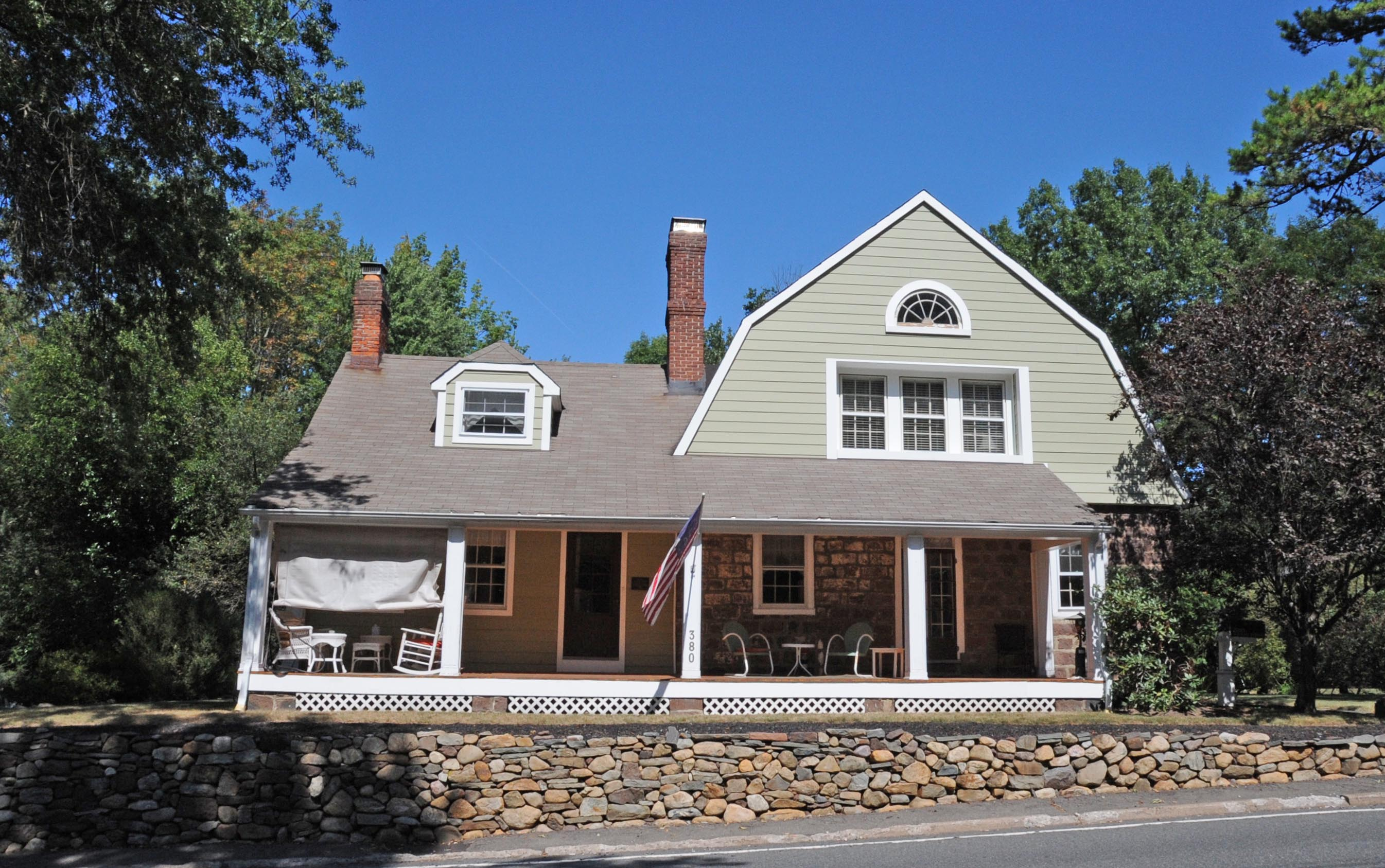

- Location within Bergen County, New Jersey Location within New Jersey Location within the United States
- Location: 380 Wyckoff Avenue, Wyckoff, New Jersey
- Coordinates: 41°0′7″N 74°9′29″W
- MPS: Stone Houses of Bergen County TR
- NRHP reference No.: 83001557
- NJRHP No.: 729

Significant dates
- Added to NRHP: January 10, 1983
- Designated NJRHP: October 3, 1980

The Van Blarcom–Jardine House is located at 380 Wyckoff Avenue in the township of Wyckoff in Bergen County, United States. The historic stone house was added to the National Register of Historic Places on January 10, 1983, for its significance in architecture. It was listed as part of the Early Stone Houses of Bergen County Multiple Property Submission (MPS).

According to the nomination form, the house was built in the 18th century, based on architectural evidence, possibly before the American Revolutionary War, by a member of the Van Blarcom family. It was owned by J. Van Blarcom in 1861 and by Japhet Jardine in 1876.

== See also ==
- National Register of Historic Places listings in Bergen County, New Jersey
