= Winters–Courter House =

- U.S. National Register of Historic Places
- New Jersey Register of Historic Places
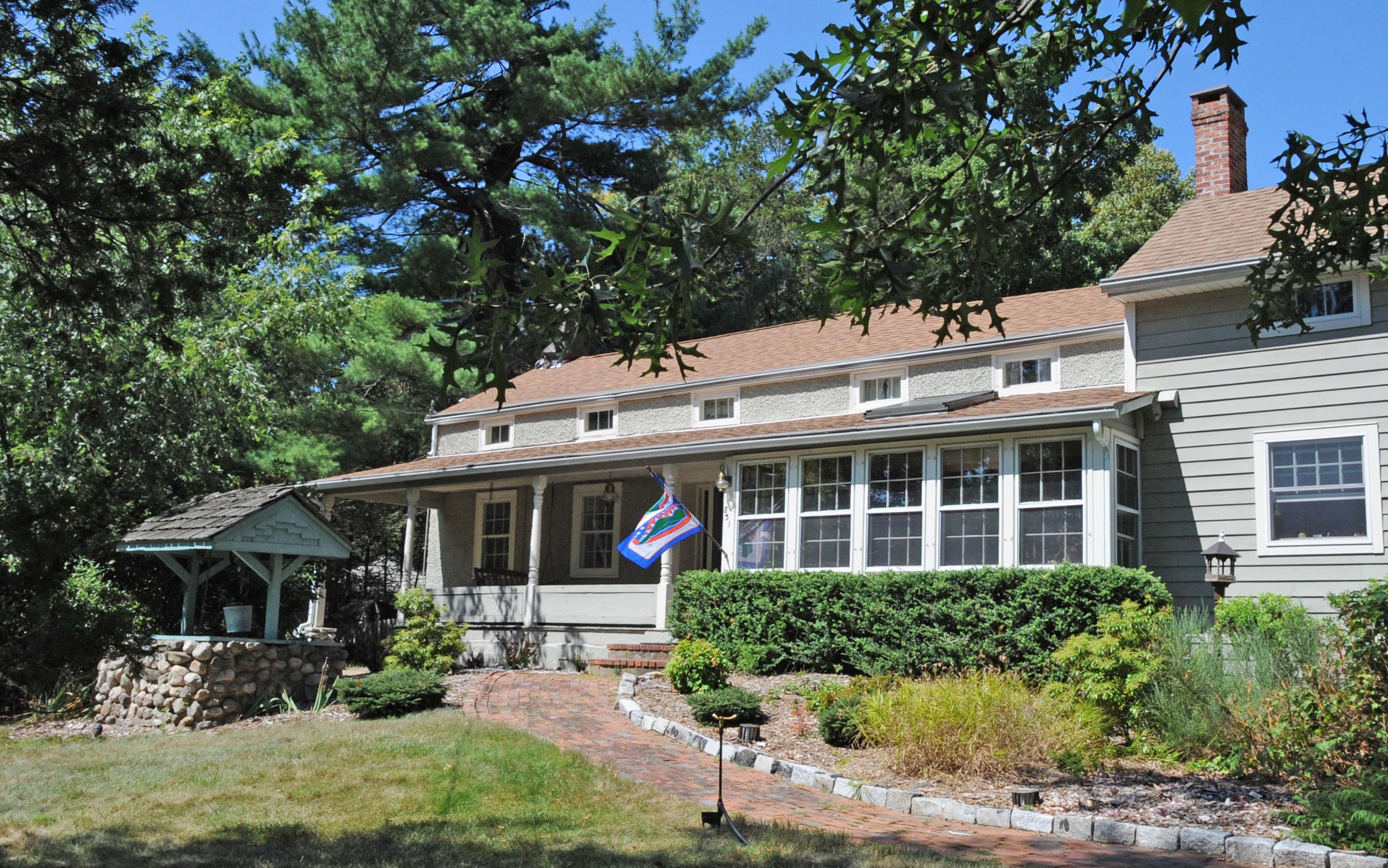

- Location within Bergen County, New Jersey Location within New Jersey Location within the United States
- Location: 831 Circle Avenue, Franklin Lakes, New Jersey
- Coordinates: 41°01′40″N 74°12′25″W
- MPS: Stone Houses of Bergen County TR
- NRHP reference No.: 83001589
- NJRHP No.: 511

Significant dates
- Added to NRHP: January 9, 1983
- Designated NJRHP: October 3, 1980

The Winters–Courter House is located at 831 Circle Avenue in the borough of Franklin Lakes in Bergen County, New Jersey, United States. The historic stone house was added to the National Register of Historic Places on January 9, 1983, for its significance in architecture. It was listed as part of the Early Stone Houses of Bergen County Multiple Property Submission (MPS).

According to the nomination form, Peter and Margaret Pulis Winters owned the house in 1833. It was later owned by William M. Courter, an American Civil War veteran, in 1876.

== See also ==
- National Register of Historic Places listings in Franklin Lakes, New Jersey
- National Register of Historic Places listings in Bergen County, New Jersey
