= Carolyn Conant Van Blarcom =

American nurse and midwife (1879-1960)

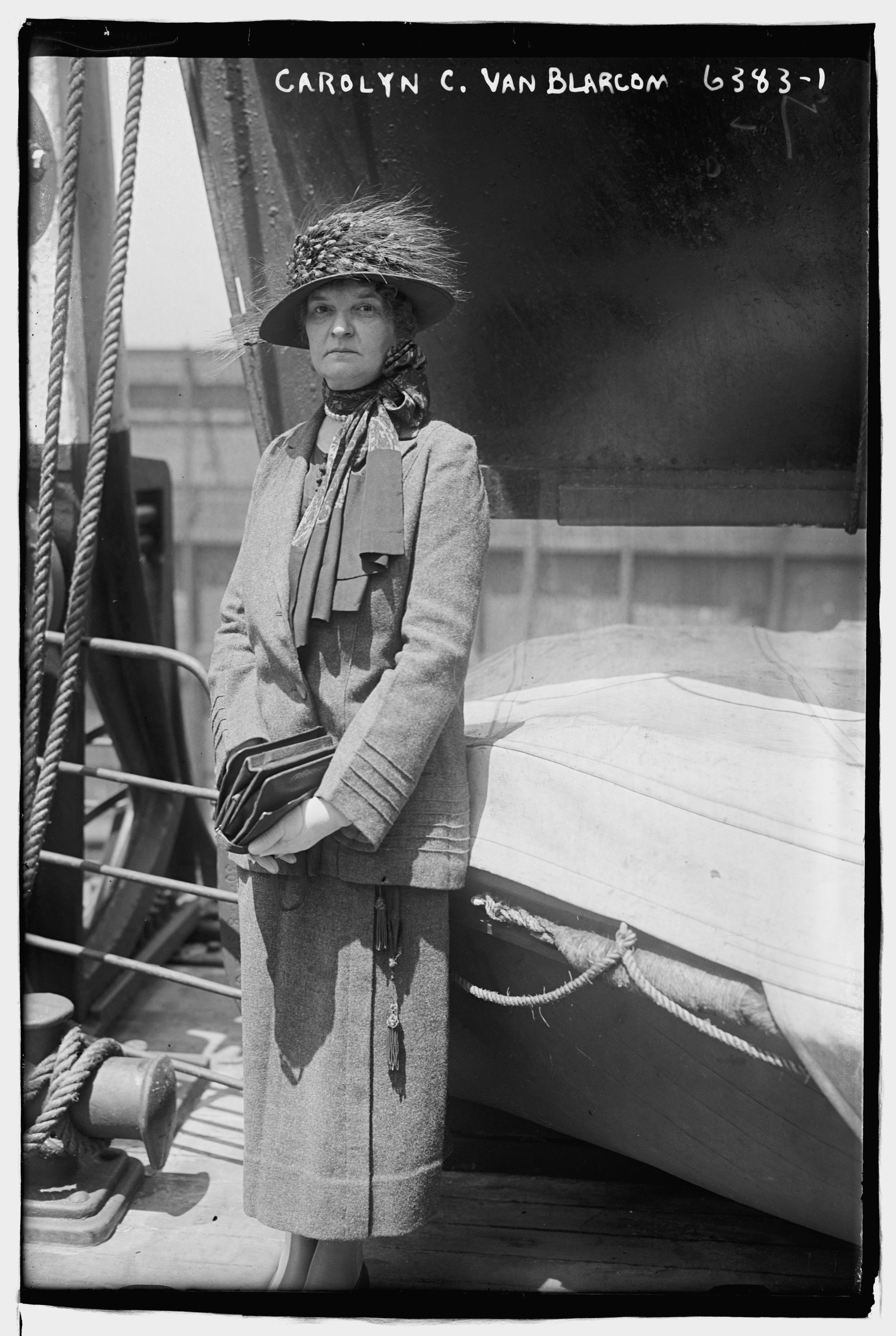
- Born: June 12, 1879; Alton, Illinois, U.S.
- Died: March 20, 1960 (aged 80); Arcadia, California, U.S.
- Education: Johns Hopkins School of Nursing
- Occupations: Nurse; midwife reformer
- Known for: First American nurse to become a licensed midwife

Carolyn Conant Van Blarcom (June 12, 1879 – March 20, 1960) was an American nurse and midwife reformer. In 1913, she became the first American nurse to become a licensed midwife. She made pioneering contributions in preventing childhood blindness. Van Blarcom also played instrumental role in establishing a school for midwives, and extensively contributed in reforming some of the important health institutions in America including the Maryland State Sanatorium for Tuberculosis.

She wrote the first obstetric nursing textbook, and prepared the curriculum for the midwives school. She also served as the health editor of the Delineator, a women's magazine, in which she published a series of articles on pregnancy and infant care.

== Biography ==
Born on June 12, 1879, in Alton, Illinois, Carolyn Conant Van Blarcom was the daughter of William Dixon Van Blarcom and Fanny Conant. In 1898 she enrolled as a pupil nurse at Johns Hopkins Hospital Training School for Nurses. After her graduation in 1901, she stayed at the Johns Hopkins Hospital Training School for Nurses, for four years, and served as instructor in obstetrics, and assistant superintendent of nurses. Her work experiences here made her as an authority on obstetrical nursing.

In 1905, she moved to St. Louis, where she reorganized a training school for nurses. Briefly in 1908, she was the director of the Maryland Tuberculosis Sanitarium at Sibillisville. She later moved to New Bedford, Massachusetts, where she became a director in a private sanitarium for tuberculosis patients.

In recognizing her organizational skills, in 1909, she was appointed as secretary of the New York State Committee for the Prevention of Blindness. This new assignment provided her opportunities to study the leading cause of preventable blindness in newborns. In association with Russell Sage Foundation, she undertook a survey of midwifery practices, and its related laws across several countries including the United States and England. In 1913, the result of this study was published as The Midwife in England.

Van Blarcom was one of the pioneers in making nursing as the educational base for midwifery. Equally she advocated the need for professional training for the nurses, particularly public health nurses in midwifery.

She extensively wrote on midwifery, and her textbook "instructed nurses how to hold back the baby's head". She was also associated with the American Red Cross.

She died of bronchopneumonia on March 20, 1960, in Arcadia, California.

== Publication ==
Van Blarcom’s publications include

- Obstetrical Nursing (1922), first obstetric nursing textbook,
- Getting Ready to be a Mother (1922)
- Building the Baby (1929)
