= Van Blarcom House (Franklin Lakes, New Jersey) =

Historic house in New Jersey, United States

- U.S. National Register of Historic Places
- New Jersey Register of Historic Places
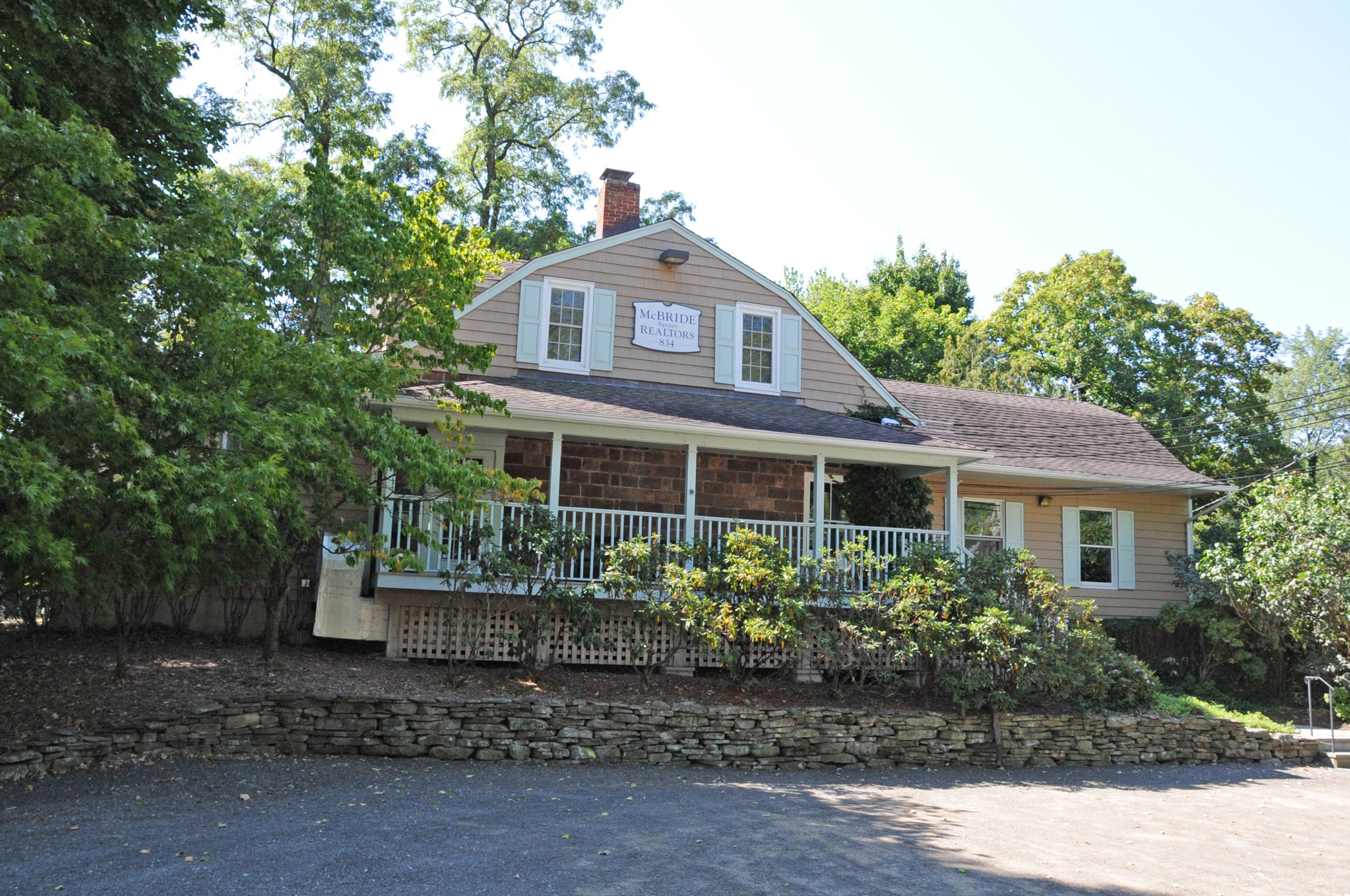

- Location within Bergen County, New Jersey Location within New Jersey Location within the United States
- Location: 834 Franklin Lake Road, Franklin Lakes, New Jersey
- Coordinates: 40°59′33″N 74°12′55″W
- Area: 8.6 acres (3.5 ha)
- Built: c. 1770–1790
- MPS: Stone Houses of Bergen County TR
- NRHP reference No.: 84002588
- NJRHP No.: 505

Significant dates
- Added to NRHP: July 24, 1984
- Designated NJRHP: October 3, 1980

The Van Blarcom House is a historic stone house located at 834 Franklin Lake Road in the borough of Franklin Lakes in Bergen County, New Jersey, United States. The house was built around 1770–1790 and was added to the National Register of Historic Places on July 24, 1984, for its significance in architecture and exploration/settlement. It was listed as part of the Early Stone Houses of Bergen County Multiple Property Submission (MPS).

The one and one-half story house features a gambrel roof. Peter Van Blarcom owned it in 1861. A fire destroyed it around 1900 and D. E. McKenzie likely rebuilt it.

== See also ==
- National Register of Historic Places listings in Franklin Lakes, New Jersey
- National Register of Historic Places listings in Bergen County, New Jersey
