= Aaron Winters House =

- U.S. National Register of Historic Places
- New Jersey Register of Historic Places
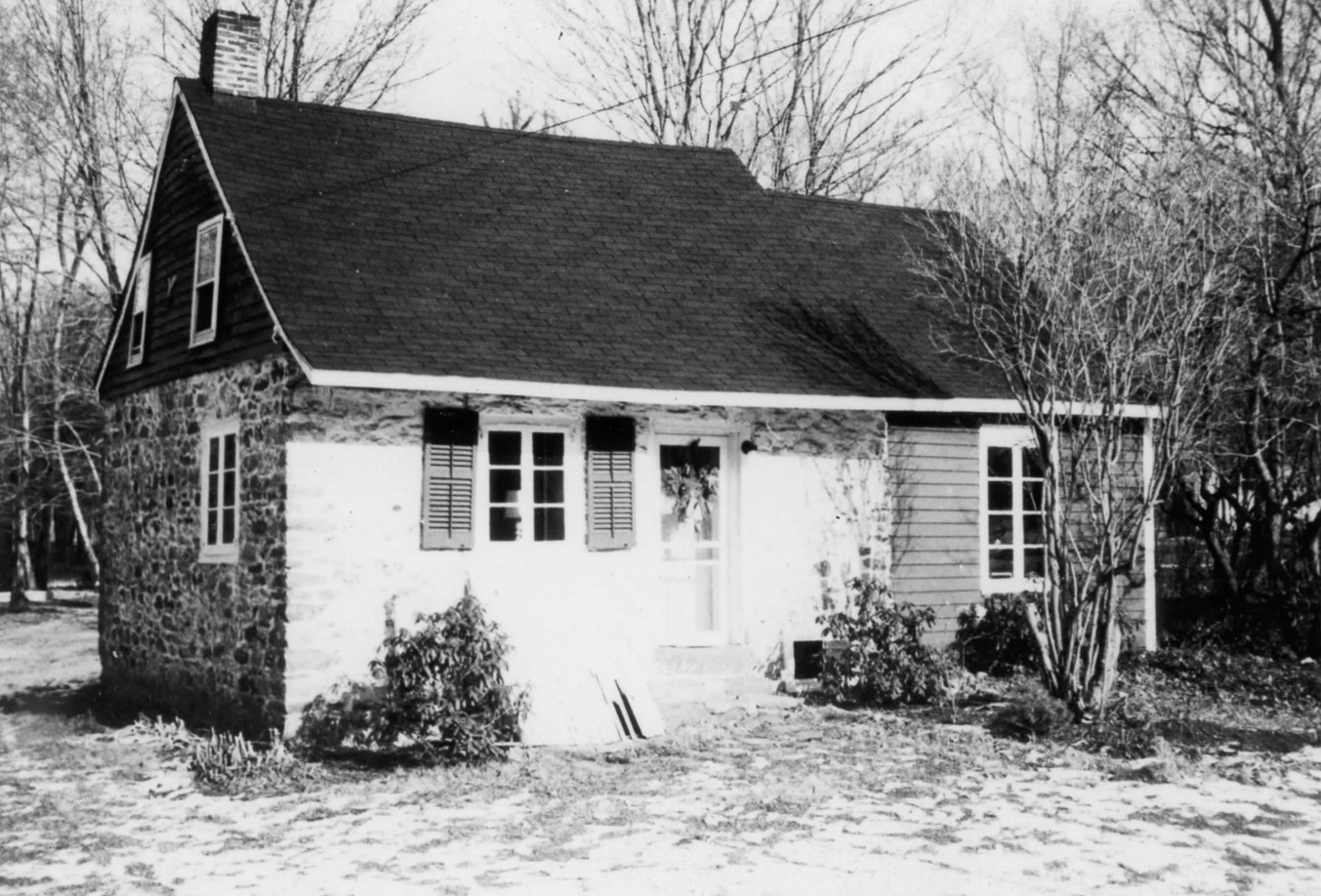

- Location within Bergen County, New Jersey Location within New Jersey Location within the United States
- Location: 312 Hobar Court, Franklin Lakes, New Jersey
- Coordinates: 41°01′26″N 74°11′19″W
- Area: 3.3 acres (1.3 ha)
- Built: 1725
- MPS: Stone Houses of Bergen County TR
- NRHP reference No.: 84002599
- NJRHP No.: 510

Significant dates
- Added to NRHP: July 24, 1984
- Designated NJRHP: October 3, 1980

The Aaron Winters House is located at 312 Hobar Court, formerly listed as 358 Woodside Avenue, in the borough of Franklin Lakes in Bergen County, New Jersey, United States. The historic stone house was built in 1725 and was added to the National Register of Historic Places on July 24, 1984, for its significance in architecture and exploration/settlement. It was listed as part of the Early Stone Houses of Bergen County Multiple Property Submission (MPS).

According to the nomination form, the stone cottage was built by a member of the Winters family in 1725, by tradition. A. Winters was living here in 1876. It is next to a larger, more modern home, which is not part of the listing.

== See also ==
- National Register of Historic Places listings in Franklin Lakes, New Jersey
- National Register of Historic Places listings in Bergen County, New Jersey
