= National Register of Historic Places listings in Wyckoff, New Jersey =

Map of Bergen County, New Jersey, highlighting Wyckoff

List of the National Register of Historic Places listings in the township of Wyckoff in Bergen County, New Jersey

Contents: Counties and communities in New Jersey
Atlantic – Bergen (Closter, Franklin Lakes, Ridgewood, Saddle River, Wyckoff) – Burlington – Camden – Cape May – Cumberland – Essex – Gloucester – Hudson – Hunterdon – Mercer – Middlesex – Monmouth – Morris – Ocean – Passaic – Salem – Somerset – Sussex – Union – Warren

The table below includes 15 sites listed on the National Register of Historic Places in the township of Wyckoff in Bergen County, New Jersey. Latitude and longitude coordinates of the sites listed on this page may be displayed in an online map.

This National Park Service list is complete through NPS recent listings posted November 6, 2026.

== Current listings ==
	Name on the Register	Image	Date listed	Location	Description
1	Cairns–Whitten–Blauvelt House	Cairns–Whitten–Blauvelt House	January 10, 1983 (#83001480)	160 Ravine Avenue; 40°58′56″N 74°09′25″W	Part of the Early Stone Houses of Bergen County Multiple Property Submission (MPS)
2	Cruse–Hossington House	Cruse–Hossington House	January 10, 1983 (#83004100)	301 Newtown Road; 40°59′43″N 74°09′22″W	Part of the Early Stone Houses of Bergen County MPS
3	Folly House	Folly House	January 10, 1983 (#83001506)	310 Crescent Avenue; 41°01′06″N 74°09′37″W	Part of the Early Stone Houses of Bergen County MPS
4	Masker House	Masker House	January 10, 1983 (#83001531)	470 Wyckoff Avenue; 41°00′00″N 74°10′27″W	Part of the Early Stone Houses of Bergen County MPS
5	Reformed Dutch Church of Wyckoff	Reformed Dutch Church of Wyckoff	April 17, 2003 (#03000250)	580 Wyckoff Avenue; 41°00′24″N 74°10′24″W	
6	John C. Stagg House	John C. Stagg House	January 10, 1983 (#83001550)	308 Sicomac Avenue; 40°59′05″N 74°10′19″W	Part of the Early Stone Houses of Bergen County MPS
7	Terhune House	Terhune House	January 10, 1983 (#83001552)	161 Godwin Avenue; 41°00′15″N 74°09′35″W	Part of the Early Stone Houses of Bergen County MPS
8	Van Blarcom–Jardine House	Van Blarcom–Jardine House	January 10, 1983 (#83001557)	380 Wyckoff Avenue; 40°59′47″N 74°10′03″W	Part of the Early Stone Houses of Bergen County MPS
9	Van Blarcom House	Van Blarcom House	January 10, 1983 (#83001556)	131 Godwin Avenue; 41°00′08″N 74°09′27″W	Part of the Early Stone Houses of Bergen County MPS
10	Albert Van Blarcom House	Albert Van Blarcom House	January 10, 1983 (#83001558)	250 Crescent Avenue; 41°00′55″N 74°09′27″W	Part of the Early Stone Houses of Bergen County MPS
11	Van Gelder House	Van Gelder House	January 10, 1983 (#83001568)	347 Godwin Avenue; 41°00′54″N 74°10′03″W	Part of the Early Stone Houses of Bergen County MPS. Demolished.
12	Van Horn–Ackerman House	Van Horn–Ackerman House	January 10, 1983 (#83001571)	101 Wyckoff Avenue; 40°59′02″N 74°09′03″W	Part of the Early Stone Houses of Bergen County MPS
13	Van Houten–Ackerman House	Van Houten–Ackerman House	January 10, 1983 (#83001574)	480 Sicomac Avenue; 40°59′24″N 74°11′08″W	Part of the Early Stone Houses of Bergen County MPS
14	Van Voorhees–Quackenbush House	Van Voorhees–Quackenbush House	January 10, 1983 (#83001577)	421 Franklin Avenue; 41°00′37″N 74°10′36″W	Part of the Early Stone Houses of Bergen County MPS
15	Van Voorhis–Quackenbush House	Van Voorhis–Quackenbush House	July 24, 1984 (#84002578)	625 Wyckoff Avenue; 41°00′35″N 74°10′25″W	Part of the Early Stone Houses of Bergen County MPS
