= Van Voorhis–Quackenbush House =

Historic house in New Jersey, United States

- U.S. National Register of Historic Places
- New Jersey Register of Historic Places
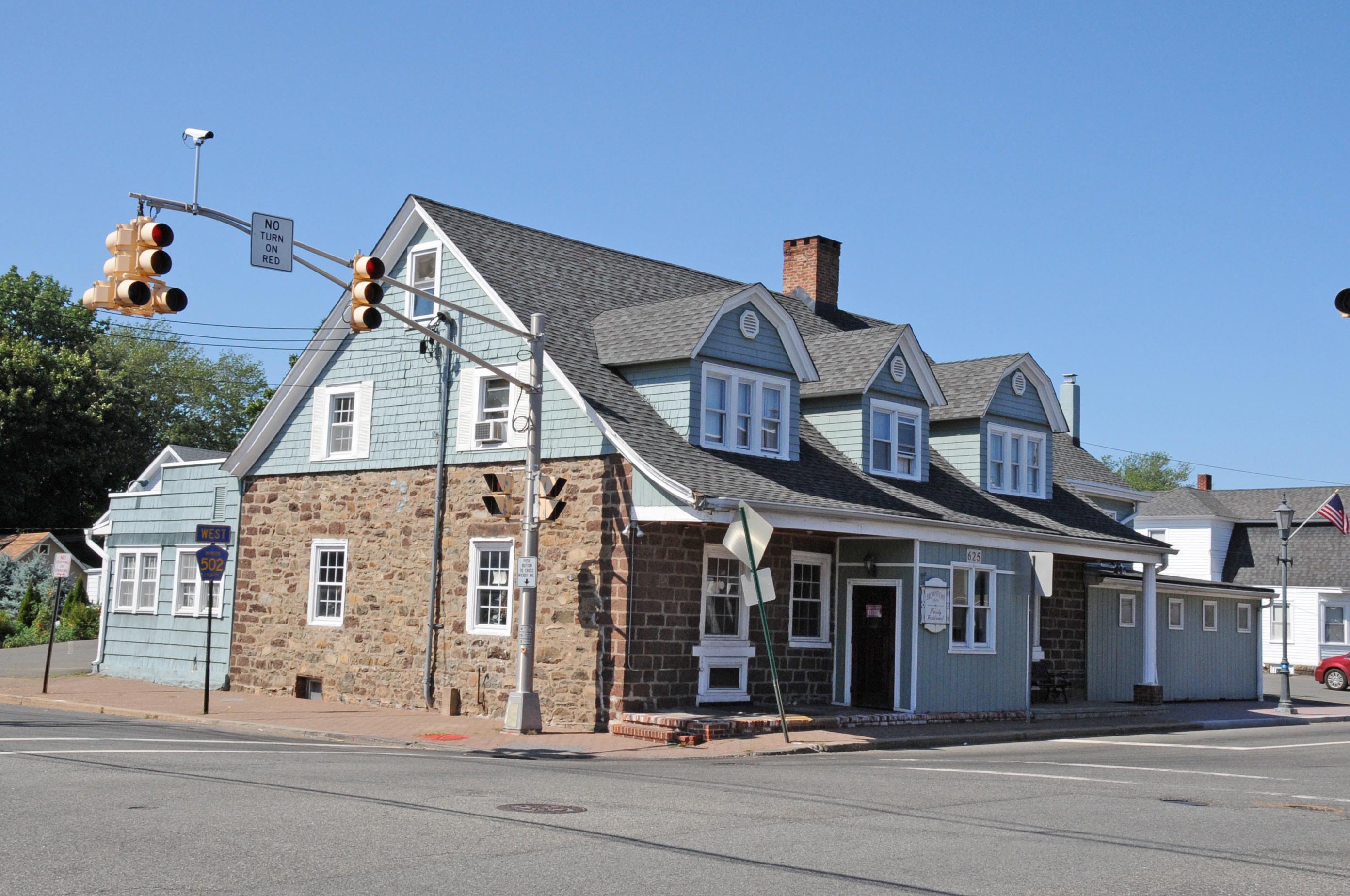

- Location within Bergen County, New Jersey Location within New Jersey Location within the United States
- Location: 625 Wyckoff Avenue, Wyckoff, New Jersey
- Coordinates: 41°0′35″N 74°10′25″W
- Built: 1784
- Built by: John A. Van Voorhis
- MPS: Stone Houses of Bergen County TR
- NRHP reference No.: 84002578
- NJRHP No.: 734

Significant dates
- Added to NRHP: July 24, 1984
- Designated NJRHP: October 3, 1980

The Van Voorhis–Quackenbush House is a historic stone house located at 625 Wyckoff Avenue in the township of Wyckoff in Bergen County, New Jersey, United States. The house was built in 1784 by John A. Van Voorhis. It was documented as the Corines Quackenbush House by the Historic American Buildings Survey (HABS) in 1941. The house was added to the National Register of Historic Places on July 24, 1984, for its significance in architecture and exploration/settlement. It was listed as part of the Early Stone Houses of Bergen County Multiple Property Submission (MPS).

The house passed from John A. Van Voorhis to his son John Van Voorhis Jr. in 1831. Corines Quackenbush bought the property in 1840. It remained in the Quackenbush family until 1920. It was sold to the M. M. Freeman & Company in 1933 and used as a tavern, the Brownstone Inn.

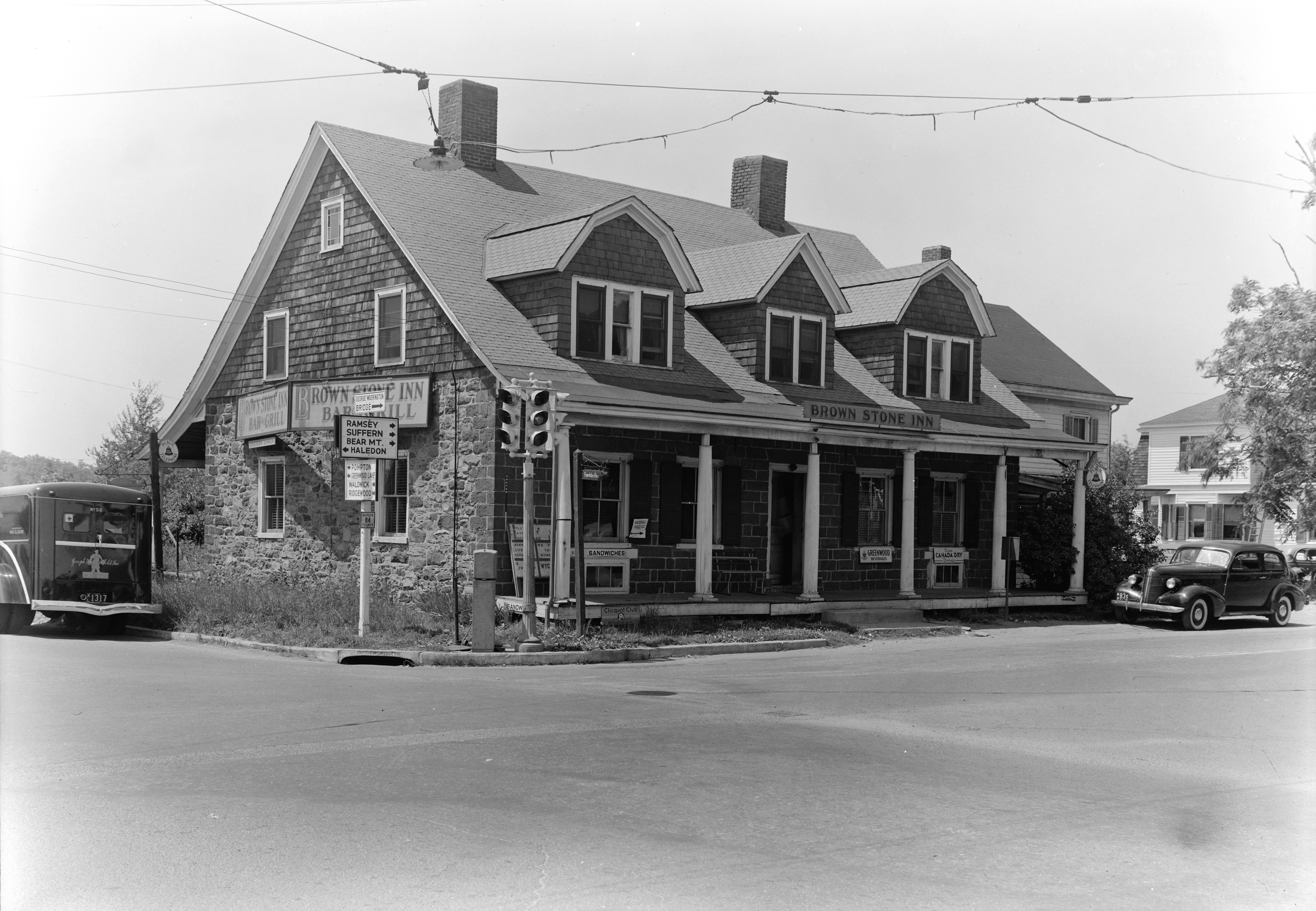
HABS photo from 1941

== See also ==
- National Register of Historic Places listings in Wyckoff, New Jersey
- National Register of Historic Places listings in Bergen County, New Jersey
