= Cairns–Whitten–Blauvelt House =

Historic house in New Jersey, United States

- U.S. National Register of Historic Places
- New Jersey Register of Historic Places
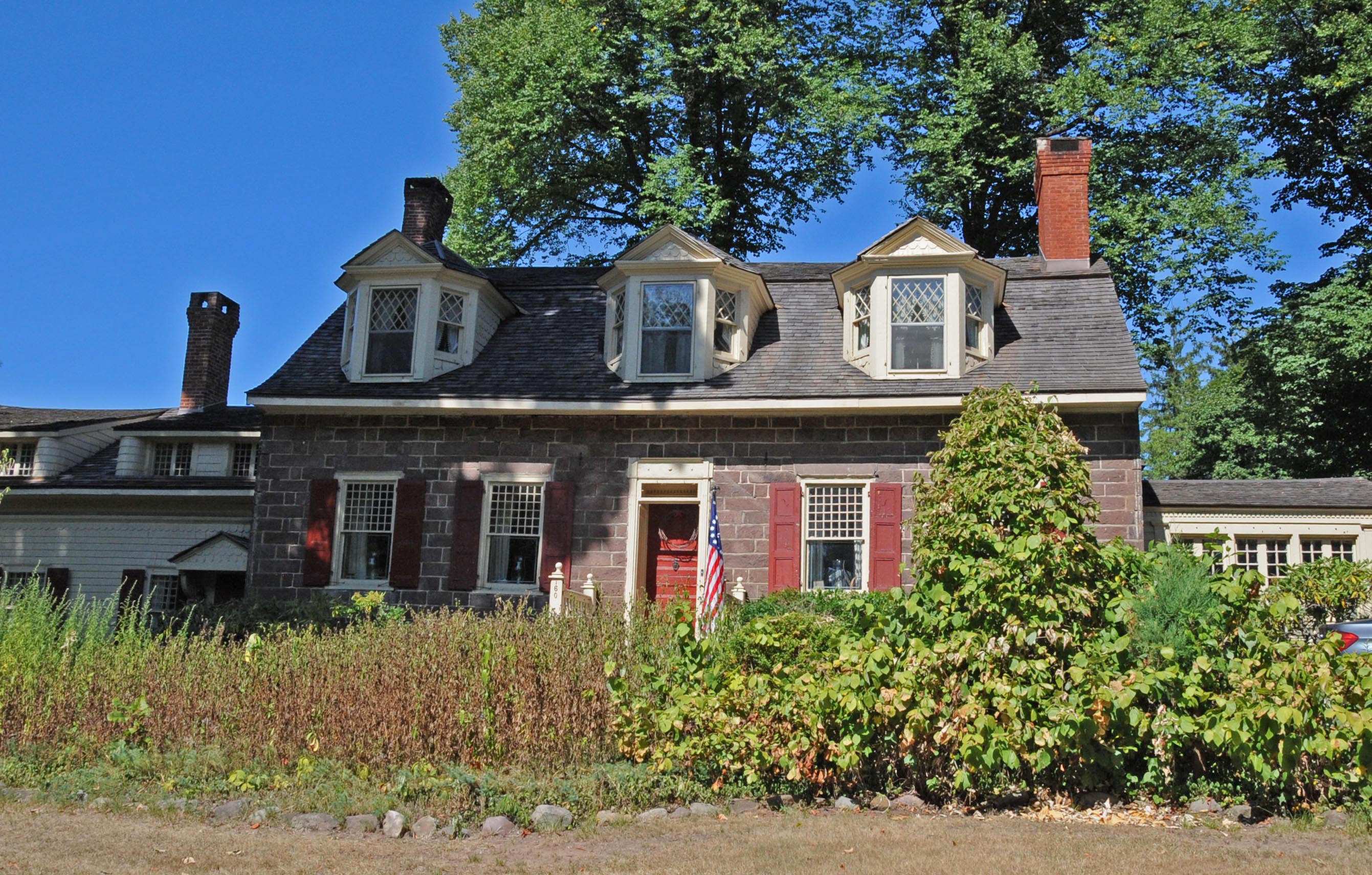

- Location within Bergen County, New Jersey Location within New Jersey Location within the United States
- Location: 160 Ravine Avenue, Wyckoff, New Jersey
- Coordinates: 40°58′56.5″N 74°9′24″W
- Area: 1.4 acres (0.57 ha)
- Built: c. 1770–1810
- Built by: Douglas Cairns
- MPS: Stone Houses of Bergen County TR
- NRHP reference No.: 83001480
- NJRHP No.: 730

Significant dates
- Added to NRHP: January 10, 1983
- Designated NJRHP: October 3, 1980

The Cairns–Whitten–Blauvelt House is a historic stone house located at 160 Ravine Avenue in the township of Wyckoff in Bergen County, United States. Built around 1770–1810 by Douglas Cairns, it was added to the National Register of Historic Places on January 10, 1983, for its significance in architecture. It was listed as part of the Early Stone Houses of Bergen County Multiple Property Submission (MPS).

Joseph Whitten bought the property in 1784. James Blauvelt bought it in 1799. It stayed in the Blauvelt family until 1854, when Adam Van Orden bought it.

== See also ==
- National Register of Historic Places listings in Wyckoff, New Jersey
- National Register of Historic Places listings in Bergen County, New Jersey
