= Van Gelder House =

Historic house in New Jersey, United States

- U.S. National Register of Historic Places
- New Jersey Register of Historic Places
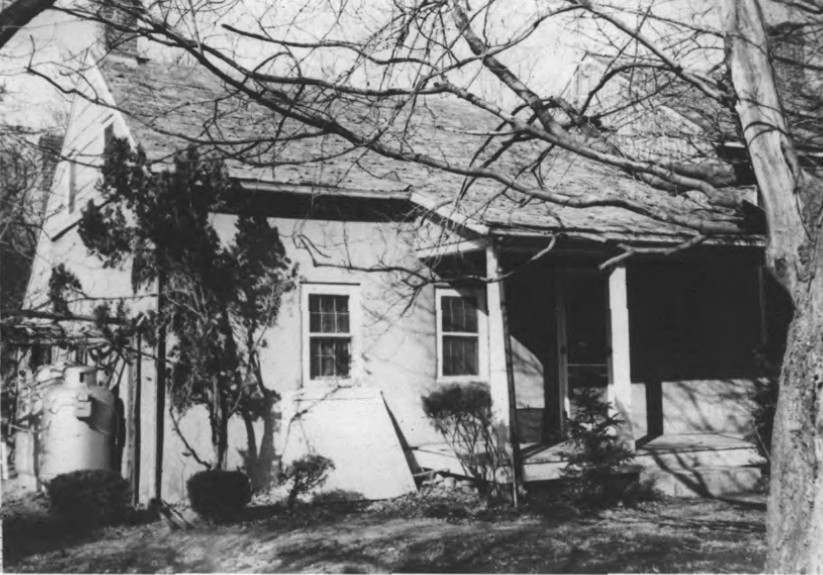
- c. 1983 photo

- Location within Bergen County, New Jersey Location within New Jersey Location within the United States
- Location: 347 Godwin Avenue, Wyckoff, New Jersey
- Coordinates: 41°0′54″N 74°10′3″W
- Built: c. 1730
- MPS: Stone Houses of Bergen County TR
- NRHP reference No.: 83001568
- NJRHP No.: 739

Significant dates
- Added to NRHP: January 10, 1983
- Designated NJRHP: October 3, 1980

The Van Gelder House was a historic house at 347 Godwin Avenue in the township of Wyckoff in Bergen County, New Jersey, United States. The historic stone house was built around 1730 by a member of the Van Gelder family. It was added to the National Register of Historic Places on January 10, 1983, for its significance in architecture and exploration/settlement. It was listed as part of the Early Stone Houses of Bergen County Multiple Property Submission (MPS). It has apparently been demolished.

== See also ==
- National Register of Historic Places listings in Wyckoff, New Jersey
- National Register of Historic Places listings in Bergen County, New Jersey
