= John C. Stagg House =

Historic house in New Jersey, United States

- U.S. National Register of Historic Places
- New Jersey Register of Historic Places
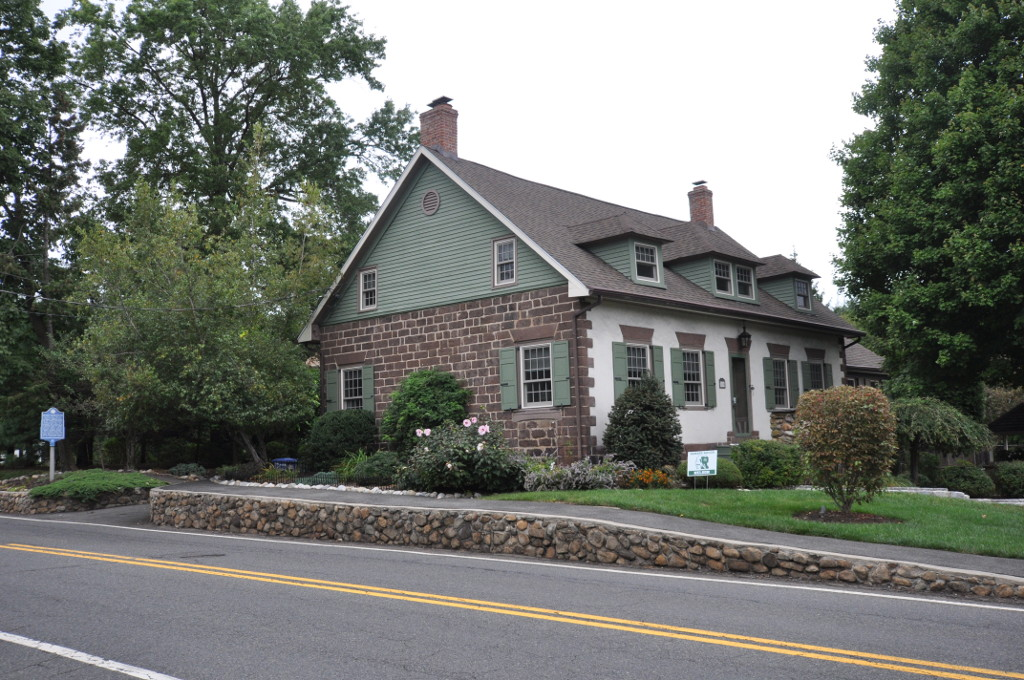
- John C. Stagg House in 2019

- Location within Bergen County, New Jersey Location within New Jersey Location within the United States
- Location: 308 Sicomac Avenue, Wyckoff, New Jersey
- Coordinates: 40°59′5″N 74°10′19″W
- Built: c. 1812
- Built by: John C. Stagg
- MPS: Stone Houses of Bergen County TR
- NRHP reference No.: 83001550
- NJRHP No.: 735

Significant dates
- Added to NRHP: January 10, 1983
- Designated NJRHP: October 10, 1980

The John C. Stagg House is a historic stone house located at 308 Sicomac Avenue in the township of Wyckoff in Bergen County, New Jersey, United States. The home was built around 1812 by John C. Stagg on the foundation of a former house that was built by his father, Cornelius Stagg. John Stagg operated a grocery store out of the basement of the house. It was documented by the Historic American Buildings Survey (HABS) in 1941. The house was added to the National Register of Historic Places on January 10, 1983, for its significance in architecture and exploration/settlement. It was listed as part of the Early Stone Houses of Bergen County Multiple Property Submission (MPS).

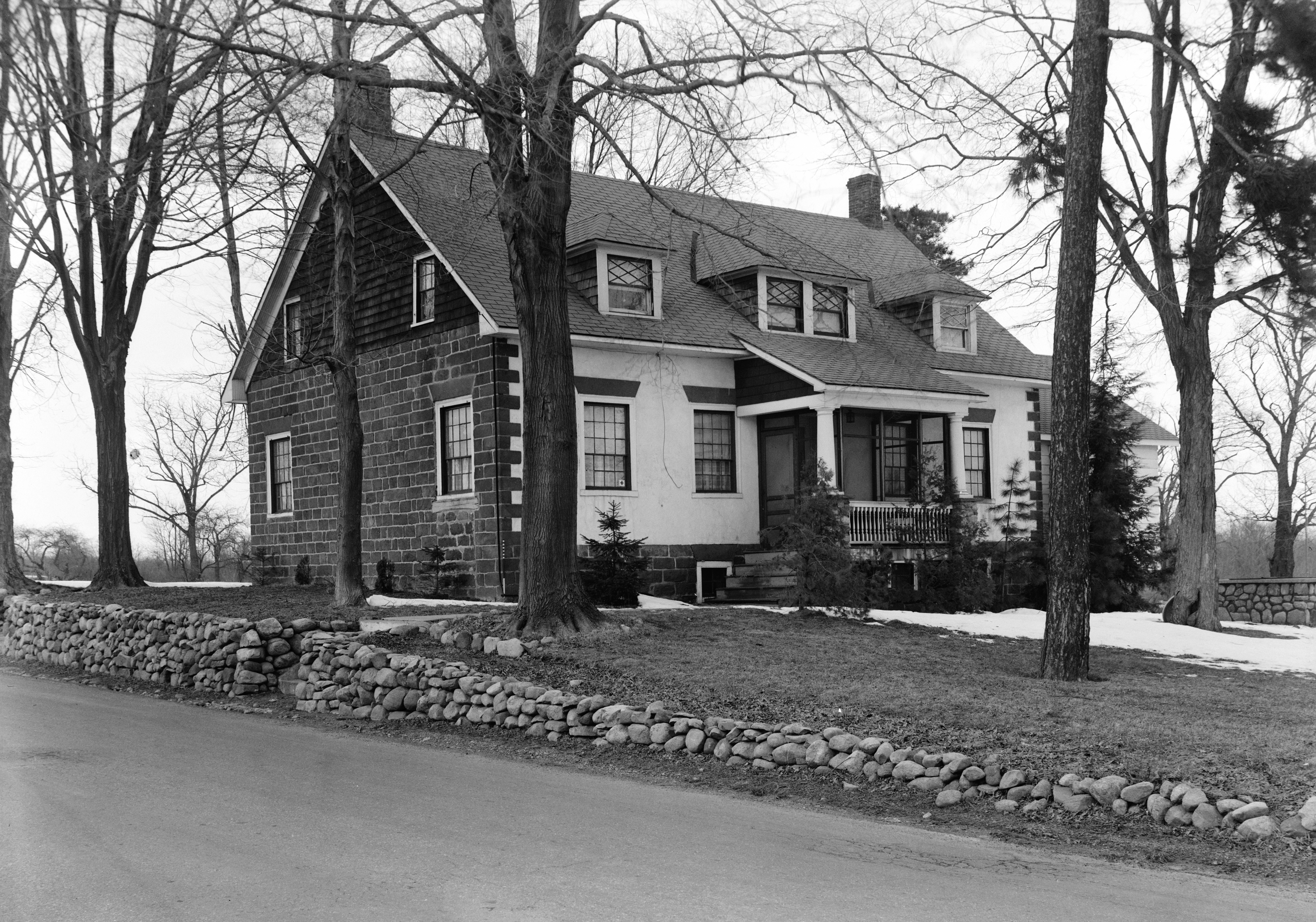
HABS photo from 1941

== See also ==
- National Register of Historic Places listings in Wyckoff, New Jersey
- National Register of Historic Places listings in Bergen County, New Jersey
