= Van Voorhees–Quackenbush House =

Historic house in New Jersey, United States

- U.S. National Register of Historic Places
- New Jersey Register of Historic Places
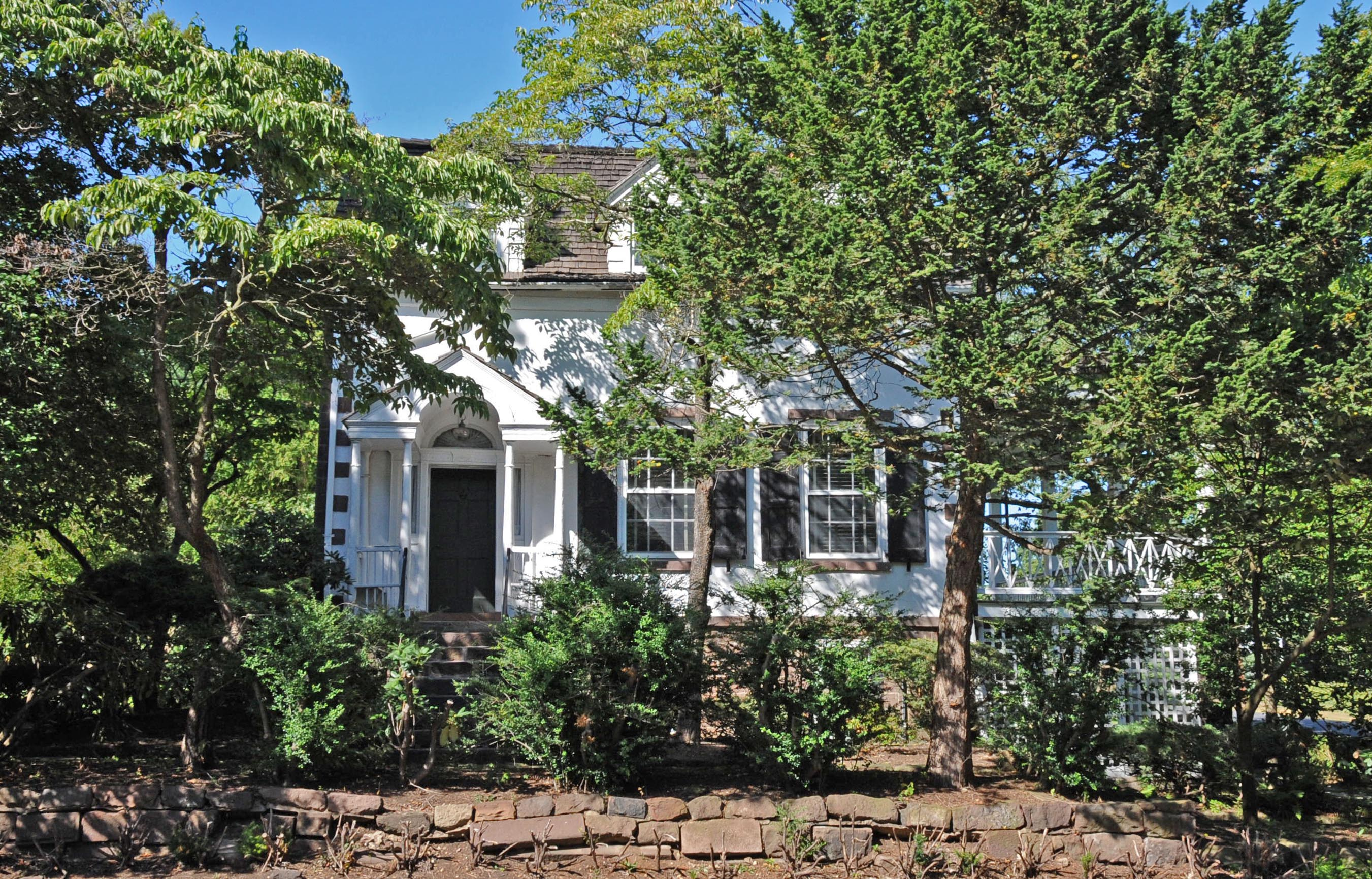

- Location within Bergen County, New Jersey Location within New Jersey Location within the United States
- Location: 421 Franklin Avenue, Wyckoff, New Jersey
- Coordinates: 41°0′37″N 74°10′36″W
- Built: c. 1740
- Built by: William Van Voorhees; Albert Van Voorhees
- MPS: Stone Houses of Bergen County TR
- NRHP reference No.: 83001577
- NJRHP No.: 742

Significant dates
- Added to NRHP: January 10, 1983
- Designated NJRHP: October 3, 1980

The Van Voorhees–Quackenbush House, also known as the Zabriskie House, is a historic stone house located at 421 Franklin Avenue in the township of Wyckoff in Bergen County, New Jersey, United States. The oldest section was built around 1740 by William Van Voorhees and enlarged in 1824 by Albert Van Voorhees. The original section of the house is now the dining room and part of the kitchen. The home was purchased in 1867 by Uriah Quackenbush. His granddaughter Grace Quackenbush Zabriskie bequeathed the home to the township in 1973. It was documented as the Albert Van Voorhis House by the Historic American Buildings Survey (HABS) in 1937. The house was added to the National Register of Historic Places on January 10, 1983, for its significance in architecture. It was listed as part of the Early Stone Houses of Bergen County Multiple Property Submission (MPS).

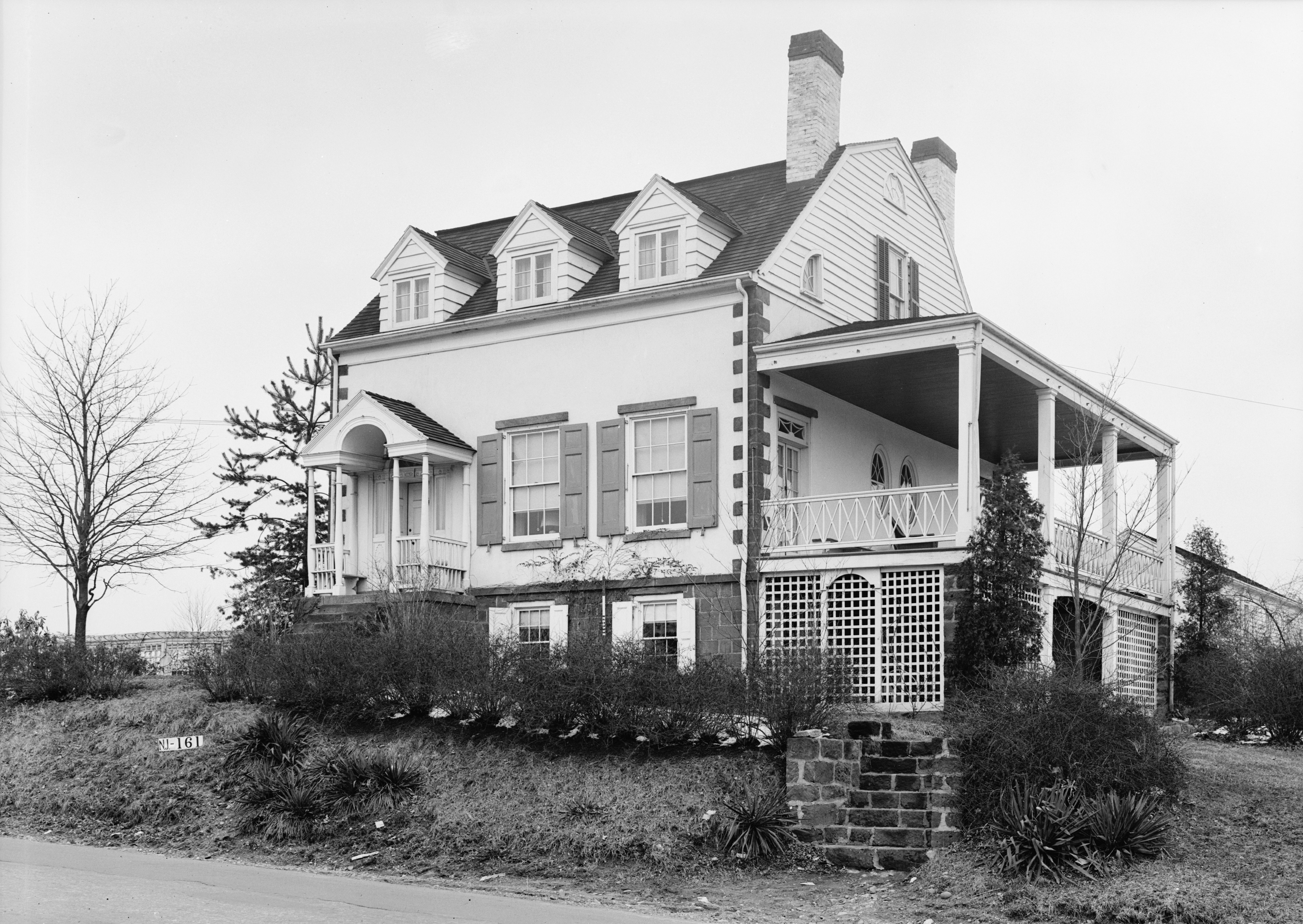
HABS photo from 1937

== See also ==
- National Register of Historic Places listings in Wyckoff, New Jersey
- National Register of Historic Places listings in Bergen County, New Jersey
