= Folly House =

Historic house in New Jersey, United States

- U.S. National Register of Historic Places
- New Jersey Register of Historic Places
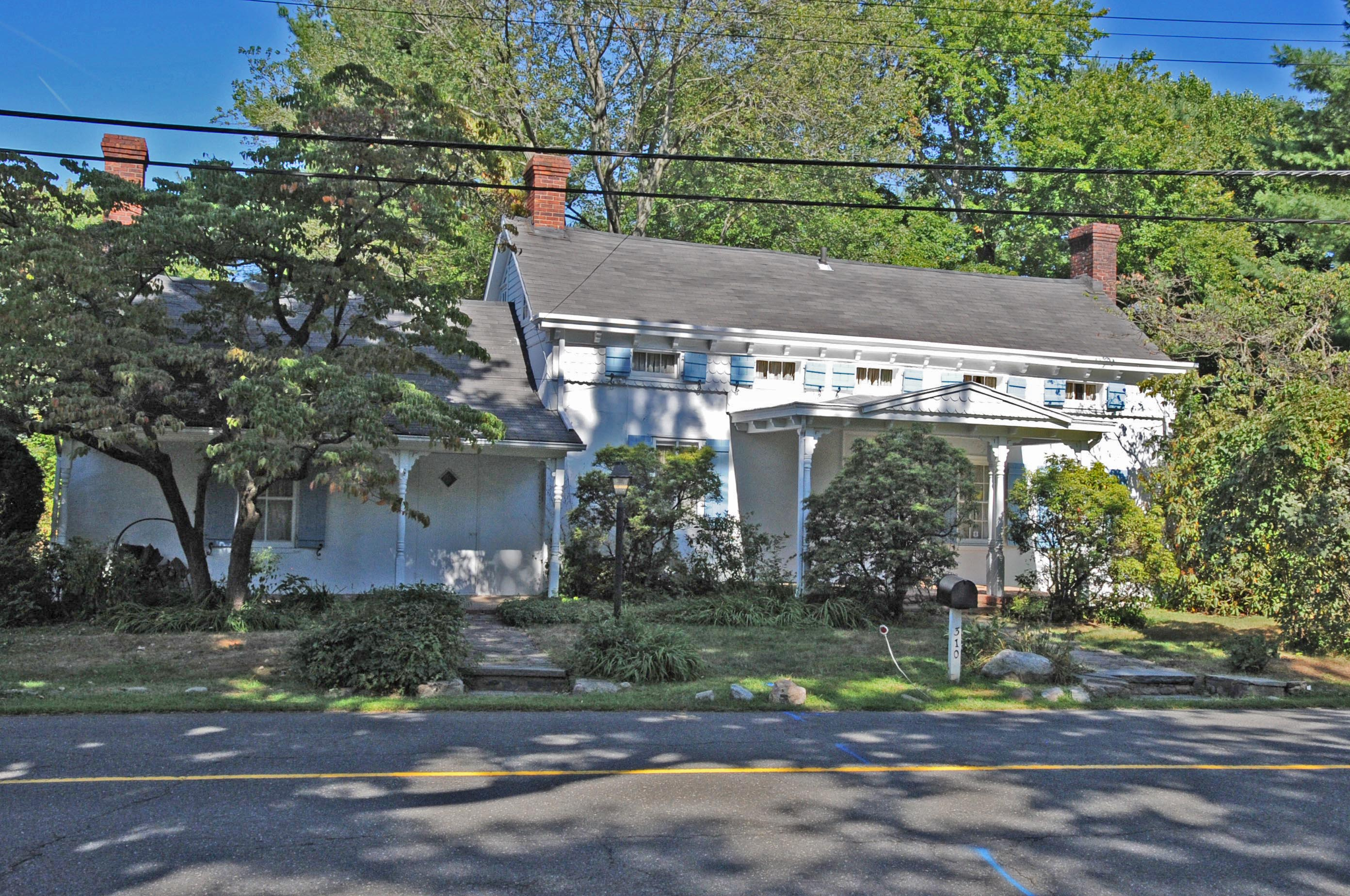

- Location within Bergen County, New Jersey Location within New Jersey Location within the United States
- Location: 310 Crescent Avenue, Wyckoff, New Jersey
- Coordinates: 41°1′6″N 74°9′37″W
- Built: c. 1770–1800
- MPS: Stone Houses of Bergen County TR
- NRHP reference No.: 83001506
- NJRHP No.: 732

Significant dates
- Added to NRHP: January 10, 1983
- Designated NJRHP: October 3, 1980

The Folly House, also known as the Folley–Bush House, is a historic stone house located at 310 Crescent Avenue in the township of Wyckoff in Bergen County, New Jersey, United States. Based on architectural evidence, the house was built around 1770–1800. It was added to the National Register of Historic Places on January 10, 1983, for its significance in architecture and exploration/settlement. It was listed as part of the Early Stone Houses of Bergen County Multiple Property Submission (MPS).

The land was purchased in 1787 by Abraham Blauvelt. The first recorded owner of the house was Folly, also spelled Folley. It was purchased by the Bush family in 1973.

== See also ==
- National Register of Historic Places listings in Wyckoff, New Jersey
- National Register of Historic Places listings in Bergen County, New Jersey
