= Masker House =

Historic house in New Jersey, United States

- U.S. National Register of Historic Places
- New Jersey Register of Historic Places
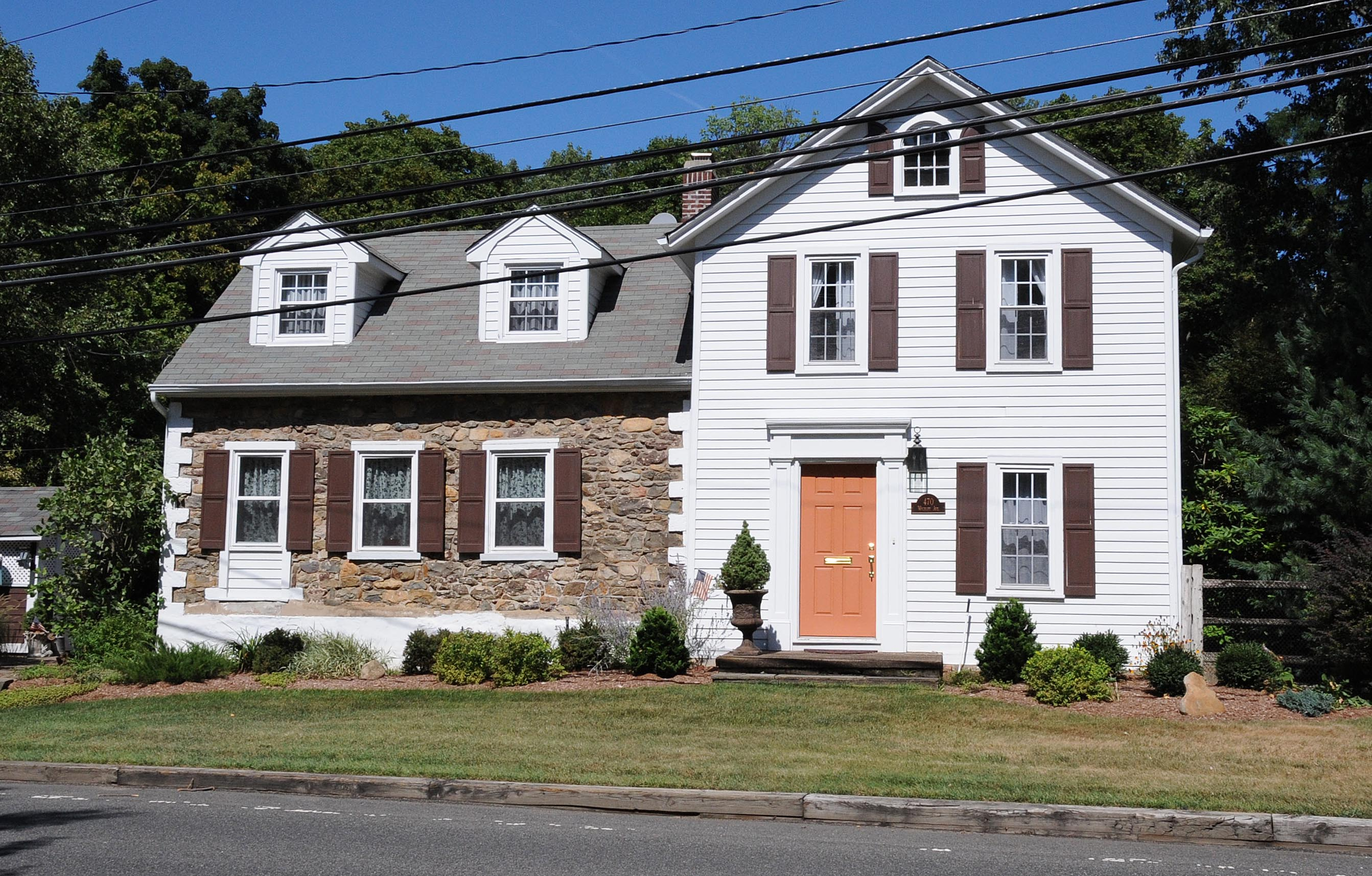

- Location within Bergen County, New Jersey Location within New Jersey Location within the United States
- Location: 470 Wyckoff Avenue, Wyckoff, New Jersey
- Coordinates: 41°0′0″N 74°10′24.5″W
- Built: c. 1780
- MPS: Stone Houses of Bergen County TR
- NRHP reference No.: 83001531
- NJRHP No.: 733

Significant dates
- Added to NRHP: January 10, 1983
- Designated NJRHP: October 3, 1980

The Masker House is a historic stone house located at 470 Wyckoff Avenue in the township of Wyckoff in Bergen County, New Jersey, United States. Based on architectural evidence, the house was built around 1780. It was added to the National Register of Historic Places on January 10, 1983, for its significance in architecture and exploration/settlement. It was listed as part of the Early Stone Houses of Bergen County Multiple Property Submission (MPS).

The land was purchased by John Rattan Jr. in 1787. The house was likely built by Conrad Pulis. In 1861, A. Masker was listed as the owner. The original house was a three-bay, 1 1/2-story house built of sandstone. A 2-story frame addition was added to the right (east) of the original section.

== See also ==
- National Register of Historic Places listings in Wyckoff, New Jersey
- National Register of Historic Places listings in Bergen County, New Jersey
