= Cruse–Hossington House =

Historic house in New Jersey, United States

- U.S. National Register of Historic Places
- New Jersey Register of Historic Places
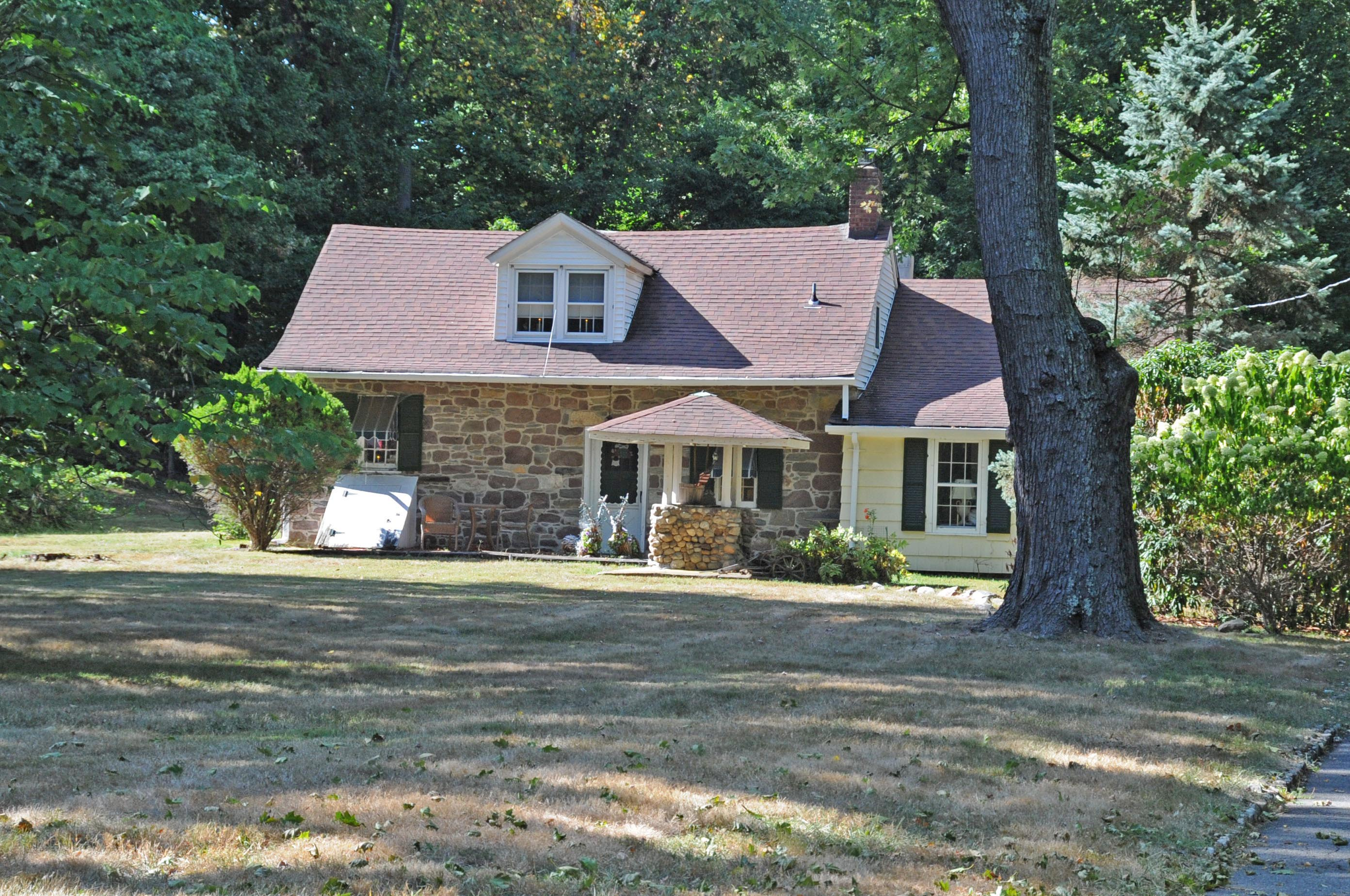

- Location within Bergen County, New Jersey Location within New Jersey Location within the United States
- Location: 301 Newtown Road, Wyckoff, New Jersey
- Coordinates: 40°59′43″N 74°9′22″W
- Area: 1.2 acres (0.49 ha)
- Built: 1798
- MPS: Stone Houses of Bergen County TR
- NRHP reference No.: 83004100
- NJRHP No.: 731

Significant dates
- Added to NRHP: January 10, 1983
- Designated NJRHP: October 3, 1980

The Cruse–Hossington House is located at 301 Newtown Road in the township of Wyckoff in Bergen County, United States. The historic stone house was built in 1798 and was added to the National Register of Historic Places on January 10, 1983, for its significance in architecture. It was listed as part of the Early Stone Houses of Bergen County Multiple Property Submission (MPS). The one and one-half story farmhouse was owned by F. C. Cruse in 1861 and by Richard Hossington in 1876 according to the nomination form.

== See also ==
- National Register of Historic Places listings in Wyckoff, New Jersey
- National Register of Historic Places listings in Bergen County, New Jersey
