= Van Horn–Ackerman House =

Historic house in New Jersey, United States

- U.S. National Register of Historic Places
- New Jersey Register of Historic Places
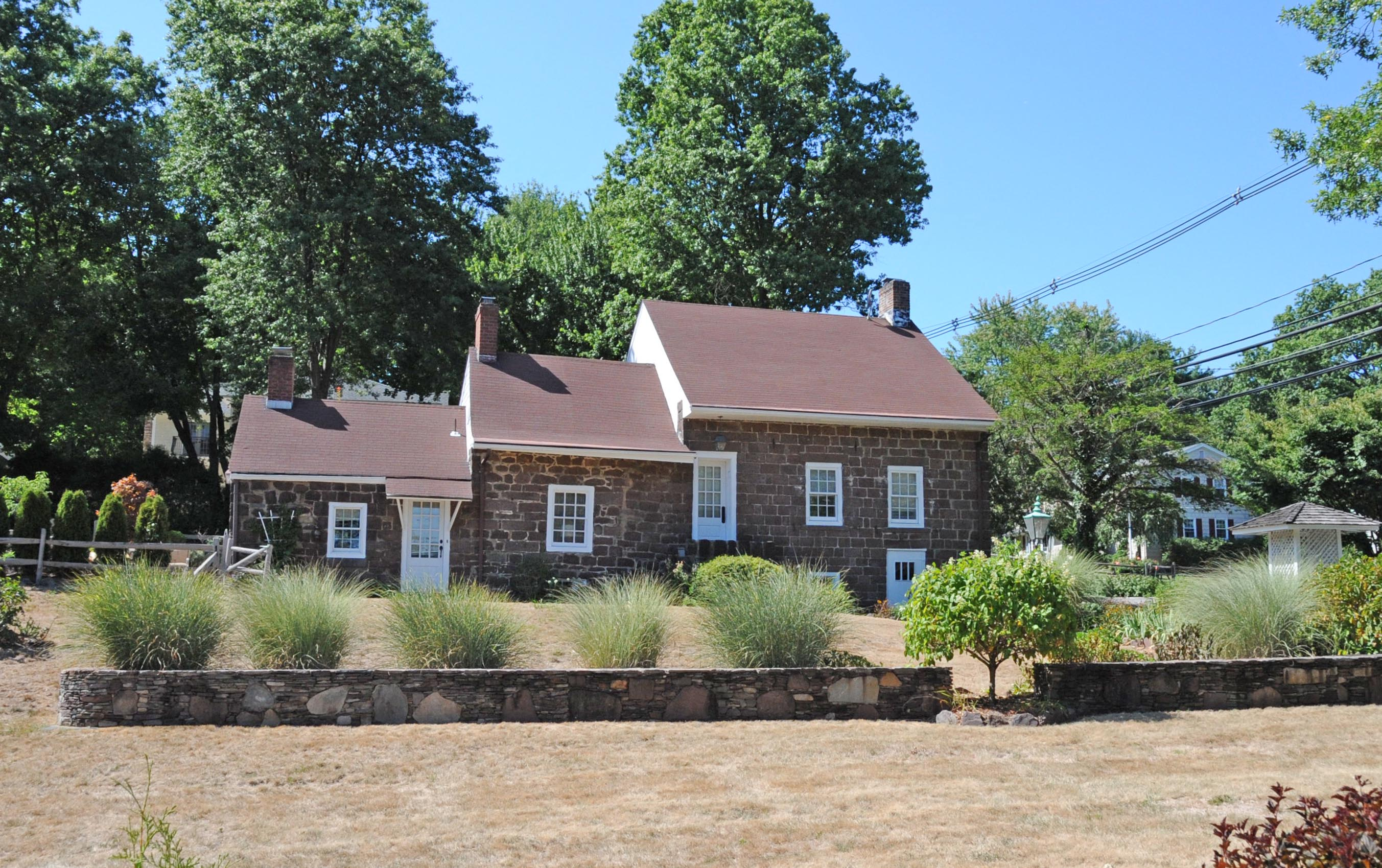

- Location within Bergen County, New Jersey Location within New Jersey Location within the United States
- Location: 101 Wyckoff Avenue, Wyckoff, New Jersey
- Coordinates: 40.9841°N 74.1502°W
- Built: 1745
- Built by: Barent Van Horn
- MPS: Stone Houses of Bergen County TR
- NRHP reference No.: 83001571
- NJRHP No.: 740

Significant dates
- Added to NRHP: January 10, 1983
- Designated NJRHP: October 3, 1980

The Van Horn–Ackerman House is a historic stone house located at 101 Wyckoff Avenue in the township of Wyckoff in Bergen County, New Jersey, United States. The oldest section of the house was built in 1745 by Barent Van Horn and is referred to as a telescope house because of the way it starts as a small house and larger additions were built later. It was documented as the John Branford House by the Historic American Buildings Survey (HABS) in 1937. The house was added to the National Register of Historic Places on January 10, 1983, for its significance in architecture and exploration/settlement. It was listed as part of the Early Stone Houses of Bergen County Multiple Property Submission (MPS).

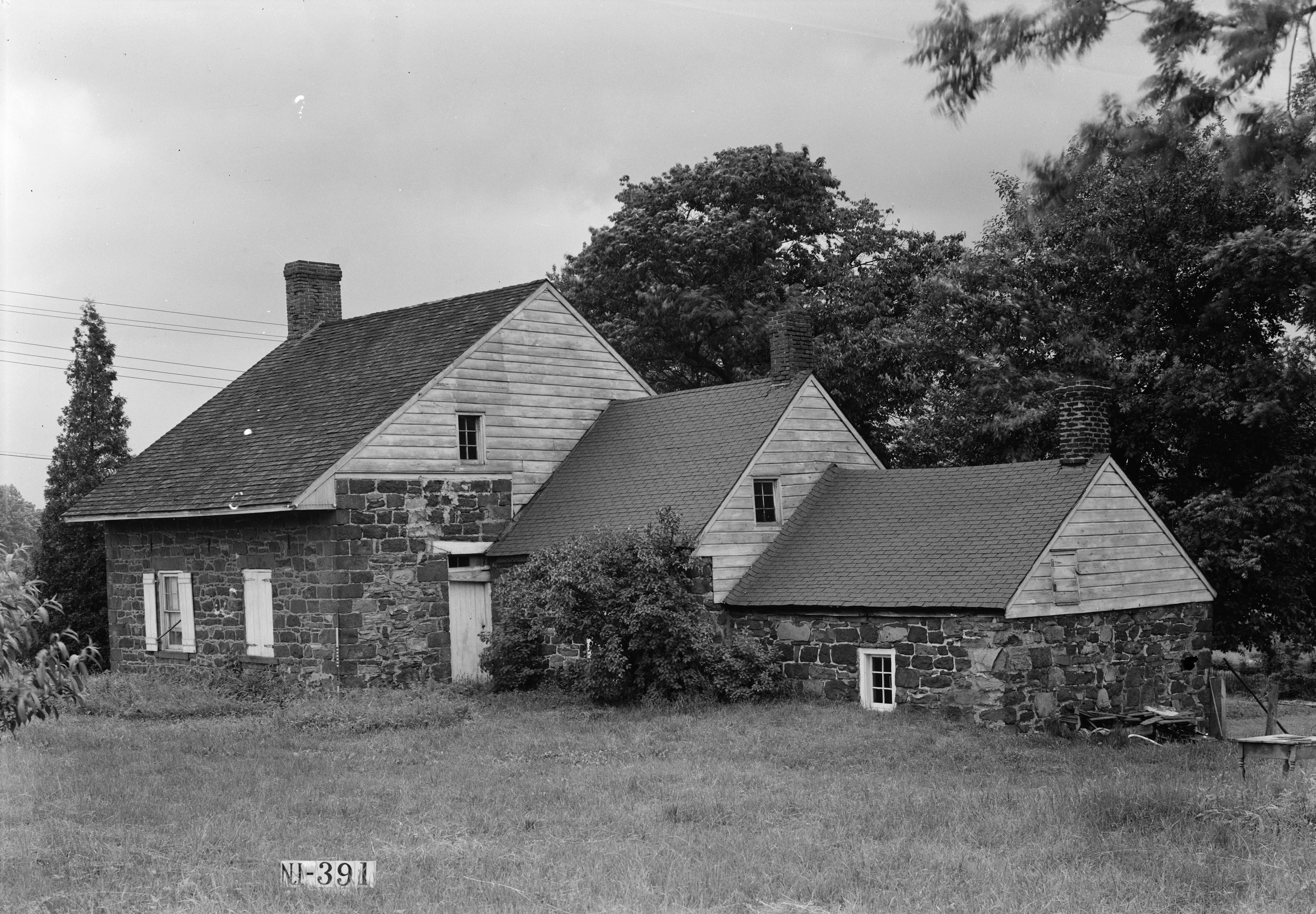
HABS photo from 1937

== See also ==
- National Register of Historic Places listings in Wyckoff, New Jersey
- National Register of Historic Places listings in Bergen County, New Jersey
