= Albert Van Blarcom House =

Historic house in New Jersey, United States

- U.S. National Register of Historic Places
- New Jersey Register of Historic Places
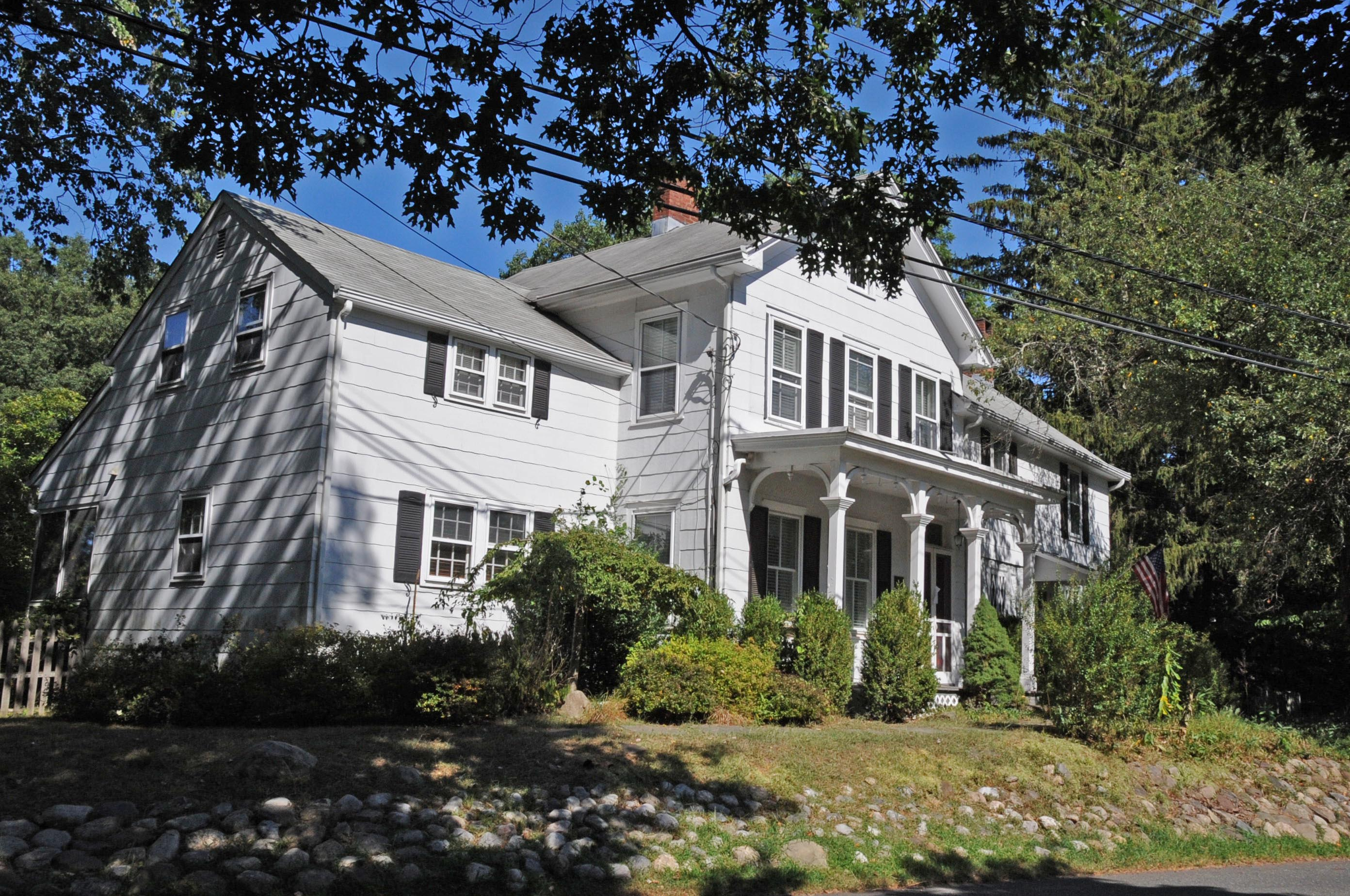

- Location within Bergen County, New Jersey Location within New Jersey Location within the United States
- Location: 250 Crescent Avenue, Wyckoff, New Jersey
- Coordinates: 41°0′55″N 74°9′27″W
- Built: 1830
- Built by: Albert Van Blarcom
- MPS: Stone Houses of Bergen County TR
- NRHP reference No.: 83001558
- NJRHP No.: 738

Significant dates
- Added to NRHP: January 10, 1983
- Designated NJRHP: October 3, 1980

The Albert Van Blarcom House is located at 250 Crescent Avenue in the township of Wyckoff in Bergen County, New Jersey, United States. The historic stone house was built in 1830 by Albert Van Blarcom and was added to the National Register of Historic Places on January 10, 1983, for its significance in architecture. It was listed as part of the Early Stone Houses of Bergen County Multiple Property Submission (MPS). It was bought by Adam Folley in 1851. James M. B. Frost bought it in 1906 and probably added a second story to the stone section in 1926.

== See also ==
- National Register of Historic Places listings in Wyckoff, New Jersey
- National Register of Historic Places listings in Bergen County, New Jersey
