= Wyckoff, New Jersey =

Township in Bergen County, New Jersey, US

- Township
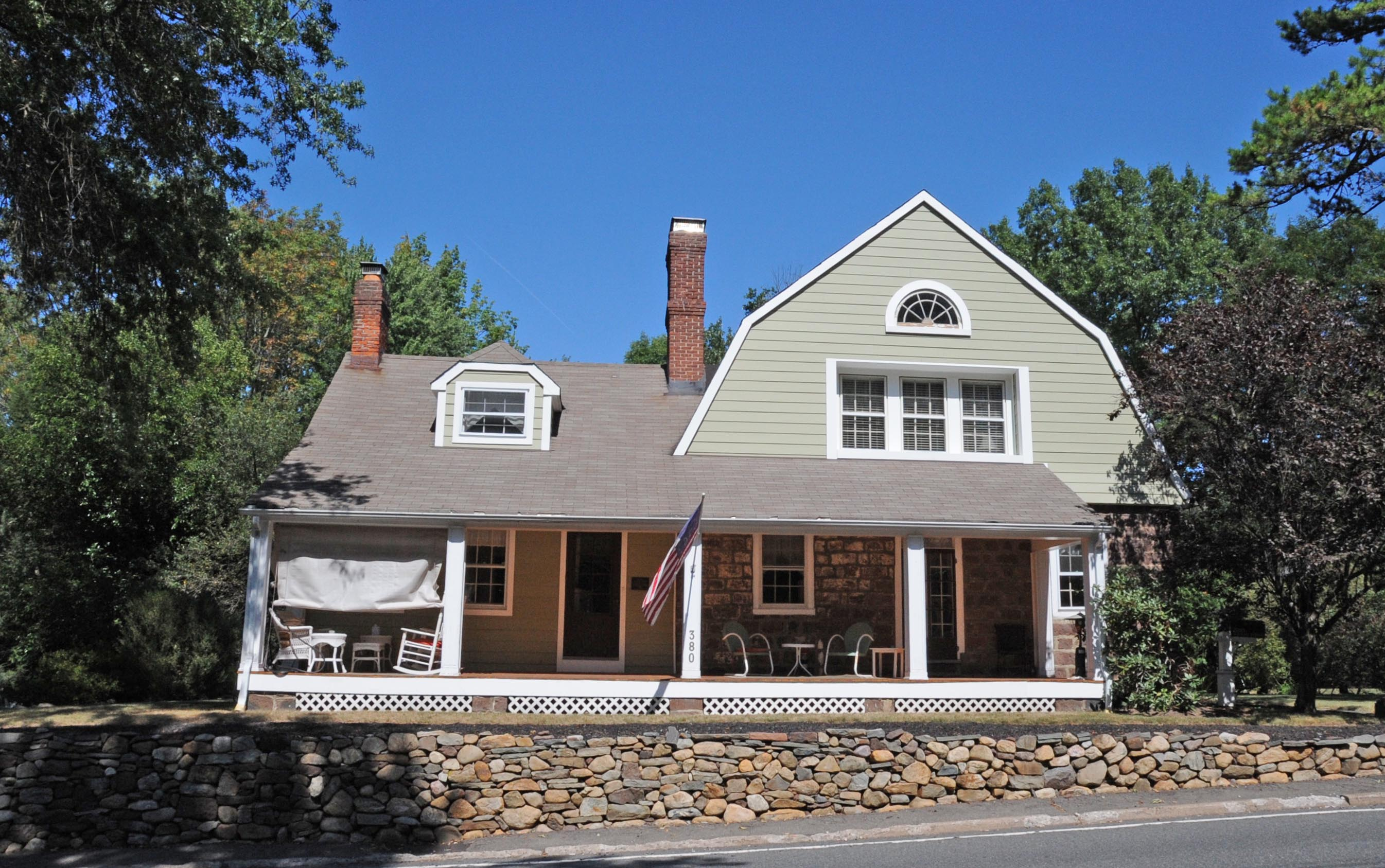
- Van Blarcom – Jardine House

- Seal
- Nickname: "Garden Town in the Garden State"
- Location of Wyckoff in Bergen County highlighted in red (left). Inset map: Location of Bergen County in New Jersey highlighted in orange (right).

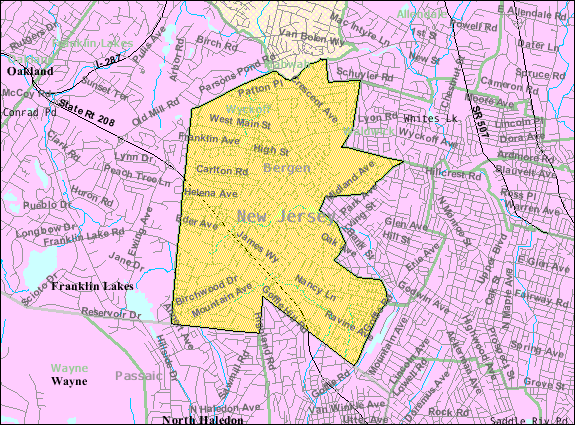
- Census Bureau map of Wyckoff, New Jersey

- Location in Bergen County Location in New Jersey Location in the United States
- Coordinates: 40.999093°N 74.168849°W
- Country: United States
- State: New Jersey
- County: Bergen
- Incorporated: November 2, 1926 (renamed from Franklin Township)

Government
  - Type: Township
  - Body: Township Committee
  - Mayor: Rudolf E. Boonstra (R, term ends December 31, 2025)
  - Administrator: Matthew A. Cavallo
  - Municipal clerk: Nancy A. Brown

Area
  - Total: 6.65 sq mi (17.22 km^{2})
  - Land: 6.59 sq mi (17.07 km^{2})
  - Water: 0.058 sq mi (0.15 km^{2}) 0.89%
  - Rank: 247th of 565 in state 6th of 70 in county
- Elevation: 331 ft (101 m)

Population (2020)
  - Total: 16,585
  - Estimate (2023): 17,047
  - Rank: 160th of 565 in state 19th of 70 in county
  - Density: 2,516.3/sq mi (971.5/km^{2})
  - Rank: 249th of 565 in state 50th of 70 in county
- Time zone: UTC−05:00 (Eastern (EST))
  - Summer (DST): UTC−04:00 (Eastern (EDT))
- ZIP Code: 07481
- Area codes: 201, 551
- FIPS code: 3400383050
- GNIS feature ID: 0882309
- Website: wyckoffnj.gov

Wyckoff /ˈwaɪkɔːf/ is a township in Bergen County, in the U.S. state of New Jersey. As of the 2020 United States census, the township's population was 16,585, a decrease of 111 (−0.7%) from the 2010 census count of 16,696, which in turn reflected an increase of 188 (+1.1%) from the 16,508 counted in the 2000 census.

As of the 2010 census, Wyckoff ranked 55th in highest-household income places in the United States with a population of at least 10,000 at $103,614. Statewide, Wyckoff ranked 41st among New Jersey locations by per capita income, with a per capita money income of $49,375 as of 1999, an increase of 49.1% from the $33,124 recorded in 1989.

From the mid-18th century, what is now Wyckoff was a community within Franklin Township, formed on June 1, 1797, when Saddle River Township (now Saddle Brook) was split, which consisted of most of northern Bergen County west of the Saddle River. Starting in the 1840s, several new municipalities were created from portions of Franklin Township (Pompton Township on April 10, 1797, Hohokus Township (now Mahwah) on April 9, 1849, and Ridgewood Township on March 30, 1876; remaining now the Village of Ridgewood), so that today what is now Wyckoff borders eight different communities. Wyckoff was formed as a township by an act of the New Jersey Legislature on November 2, 1926, replacing Franklin Township, based on the results of a referendum held that day. Portions of Wyckoff were ceded to Midland Park based on the results of a referendum held on June 9, 1931.

Though there is no solid historical evidence for any of the various theories, the most commonly given origin for the name Wyckoff, which was the origin accepted by the township committee when the municipality was established, is that the name is from the Lenape word wickoff, meaning "high ground", or that it is from wickok, meaning "water". However, similarly named Wyckoff Heights in New York City is named after the Wyckoff family, who settled in the New York/New Jersey area when both states were part of the Dutch colony of New Netherlands. Other sources ascribe the name to Wicaugh in Malpas, England.

== History ==
The first known human inhabitants of the area were the Lenni Lenape Native Americans who lived north of the Raritan River and spoke a Munsee dialect of Algonquian. Sicomac, said to mean "resting place for the departed" or "happy hunting ground", is an area of Wyckoff that, according to tradition, was the burial place of many Native Americans, including Chief Oratam of the Ackingshacys, and many stores and buildings in the community have been named after the area's name, including Sicomac Elementary School. Most Native Americans had left by the 19th century, although a small group lived near Clinton Avenue until 1939.

What is Wyckoff today was originally part of Saddle River Township, which included all of Bergen County west of the Saddle River. Saddle River Township was split in 1771, with the area containing Wyckoff becoming Franklin Township. By 1755, about 100 families lived in the Franklin Township area, of which no more than 20 were in what is now Wyckoff. Franklin Township (1771) consisted of what is today Ho-Ho-Kus (seceded 1849), Ridgewood (seceded 1876), Midland Park (seceded 1894), Oakland (seceded 1902), Franklin Lakes (seceded 1922), and Wyckoff. The size of Franklin Township decreased as areas seceded and were incorporated into their own municipalities. After Franklin Lakes was established in 1922, Franklin Township consisted of only the area known locally as Wyckoff. On November 2, 1926, residents voted (243 positive votes out of 337) to change the name from Franklin Township to the Township of Wyckoff.

The first recorded permanent settlers were John and William Van Voor Haze (Anglicized as Voorhees), who bought 550 acres (220 ha) of land in the area in 1720. Other early settlers, primarily Dutch, included the Van Horns, Terhunes, Ackermans, Quackenbushes, Pulises and Vanderhoffs. In 1940, the population was just under 4,000, with 30% of the land devoted to farming. By 1969, the number of farms had decreased to 13. By 2012, only two farms remained: Abma's Farm and Goffle Road Poultry Farm, which is Bergen County's only remaining live market. Rail service by the New Jersey Midland Railway began in 1870. That service was purchased by the New York, Susquehanna and Western Railway, which abruptly ended passenger service in 1966.

The Terhune House is an historic home listed on the National Register of Historic Places, located at 161 Godwin Avenue, that was initially constructed in 1737.

In 1994, the Vander Plaat funeral home prepared the body of Richard Nixon for burial.

== Geography ==
According to the U.S. Census Bureau, the township had a total area of 6.65 square miles (17.22 km^{2}), including 6.59 square miles (17.07 km^{2}) of land and 0.06 square miles (0.15 km^{2}) of water (0.89%).

Unincorporated communities, localities and place names located partially or completely within the township include Sicomac.

The township borders the municipalities of Allendale, Franklin Lakes, Mahwah, Midland Park, Ridgewood and Waldwick in Bergen County; and both Hawthorne and North Haledon in Passaic County.

As of 2026, the township is a member of Local Leaders for Responsible Planning in order to address the township's Mount Laurel doctrine-based housing obligations.

== Climate ==
The climate in this area is characterized by hot, mild summers and generally cold winters. According to the Köppen Climate Classification system, Wyckoff has a humid subtropical climate, abbreviated "Cfa" on climate maps.

== Demographics ==
Historical population
Census	Pop.	Note	%±
1900	1,285		—
1910	1,509		17.4%
1920	1,288		−14.6%
1930	3,001	*	133.0%
1940	3,847	*	28.2%
1950	5,590		45.3%
1960	11,205		100.4%
1970	16,039		43.1%
1980	15,500		−3.4%
1990	15,372		−0.8%
2000	16,508		7.4%
2010	16,696		1.1%
2020	16,585		−0.7%
2023 (est.)	17,047		2.8%
Population sources: 1910–1930 1900–2020; 2000 2010 2020 * Lost territory in previous decade.

Wyckoff township, Bergen County, New Jersey – Racial and ethnic composition Note: the US Census treats Hispanic/Latino as an ethnic category. This table excludes Latinos from the racial categories and assigns them to a separate category. Hispanics/Latinos may be of any race.
Race / Ethnicity (NH = Non-Hispanic)	Pop 2000	Pop 2010	Pop 2020	% 2000	% 2010	% 2020
White alone (NH)	15,312	15,005	13,767	92.76%	89.87%	83.01%
Black or African American alone (NH)	73	81	93	0.44%	0.49%	0.56%
Native American or Alaska Native alone (NH)	19	5	4	0.12%	0.03%	0.02%
Asian alone (NH)	611	705	872	3.70%	4.22%	5.26%
Native Hawaiian or Pacific Islander alone (NH)	2	0	3	0.01%	0.00%	0.02%
Other race alone (NH)	13	12	23	0.08%	0.07%	0.14%
Mixed race or Multiracial (NH)	102	151	508	0.62%	0.90%	3.06%
Hispanic or Latino (any race)	376	737	1,315	2.28%	4.41%	7.93%
Total	16,508	16,696	16,585	100.00%	100.00%	100.00%

=== 2020 census ===
The 2020 United States census counted 16,589 people and 5,749 households in the township, and the population density was 2532.6 people per square mile. The racial makeup was 90.1% White (14,946), 87.7% non-Hispanic White (14,549), 1.0% Black (166), 0.1% Native American (17), 5.2% Asian (863), 0.0% Pacific Islander (0), 5.4% Latino (896), and 3.3% from two or more races (547).

Of the 16,589 inhabitants, 24.7% were under the age of 18; 4.4% were under the age of 5; 20.6% were 65 or older; 12.8% spoke a language other than English at home; 10.7% were foreign-born; 4.0% were veterans; and 51.4% were female. The average household size was 2.86. 90.0% of homes were owner-occupied and the median value of such homes was $803,500; the median gross rent, meanwhile, was $2,127.

The median yearly household income was $167,368 and the per-capita yearly income was $82,422; 62.1% of residents older than 16 had a job and the mean commute time was 30.6 minutes. 96.3% of inhabitants older than 25 had a high-school diploma and 65.1% had a bachelor's degree or higher. 1.6% of Wyckoff's population was living in poverty, 1.5% of those younger than 65 did not have health insurance, and 2.9% of the same group was disabled.

=== 2010 census ===
The 2010 United States census counted 16,696 people, 5,646 households, and 4,641 families in the township. The population density was 2,550.1 per square mile (984.6/km^{2}). There were 5,827 housing units at an average density of 890.0 per square mile (343.6/km^{2}). The racial makeup was 93.53% (15,616) White, 0.56% (94) Black or African American, 0.04% (7) Native American, 4.23% (706) Asian, 0.00% (0) Pacific Islander, 0.47% (79) from other races, and 1.2% (194) from two or more races. Hispanic or Latino of any race were 4.41% (737) of the population.

Of the 5,646 households, 40.6% had children under the age of 18; 73.2% were married couples living together; 6.8% had a female householder with no husband present and 17.8% were non-families. Of all households, 16.1% were made up of individuals and 10.3% had someone living alone who was 65 years of age or older. The average household size was 2.89 and the average family size was 3.26.

27.6% of the population were under the age of 18, 5.7% from 18 to 24, 17.9% from 25 to 44, 32.1% from 45 to 64, and 16.6% who were 65 years of age or older. The median age was 44.3 years. For every 100 females, the population had 92.2 males. For every 100 females ages 18 and older there were 88.0 males.

The Census Bureau's 2006–2010 American Community Survey showed that (in 2010 inflation-adjusted dollars) median household income was $145,366 (with a margin of error of +/− $11,501) and the median family income was $163,034 (+/− $10,963). Males had a median income of $111,950 (+/− $12,210) versus $64,148 (+/− $10,102) for females. The per capita income for the township was $64,476 (+/− $5,019). About 0.6% of families and 2.1% of the population were below the poverty line, including 0.9% of those under age 18 and 2.4% of those age 65 or over.

In 2010, the median income for a household in the township was $138,373, and the median income for a family was $154,420. In 2000, males had a median income of $87,850 versus $51,929 for females. The per capita income for the township was $49,375. About 1.1% of families and 1.8% of the population were below the poverty line, including 1.3% of those under age 18 and 1.9% of those age 65 or over.

Same-sex couples headed 24 households in 2010, an increase from the 17 counted in 2000.

=== 2000 census ===
As of the 2000 U.S. census, there were 16,508 people, 5,541 households, and 4,632 families residing in the township. The population density was 2,521.6 inhabitants per square mile (973.6/km^{2}). There were 5,638 housing units at an average density of 861.2 per square mile (332.5/km^{2}). The racial makeup of the township was 94.54% White, 0.47% African American, 0.15% Native American, 3.70% Asian, 0.01% Pacific Islander, 0.45% from other races, and 0.68% from two or more races. Hispanic or Latino of any race were 2.28% of the population.

There were 5,541 households, out of which 42.4% had children under the age of 18 living with them, 75.7% were married couples living together, 5.8% had a female householder with no husband present, and 16.4% were non-families. 14.8% of all households were made up of individuals, and 8.9% had someone living alone who was 65 years of age or older. The average household size was 2.89 and the average family size was 3.22.

In the township, the population was spread out, with 28.3% under the age of 18, 4.3% from 18 to 24, 25.4% from 25 to 44, 26.2% from 45 to 64, and 15.8% who were 65 years of age or older. The median age was 41 years. For every 100 females, there were 91.3 males. For every 100 females age 18 and over, there were 87.5 males.

== Government ==
=== Local government ===
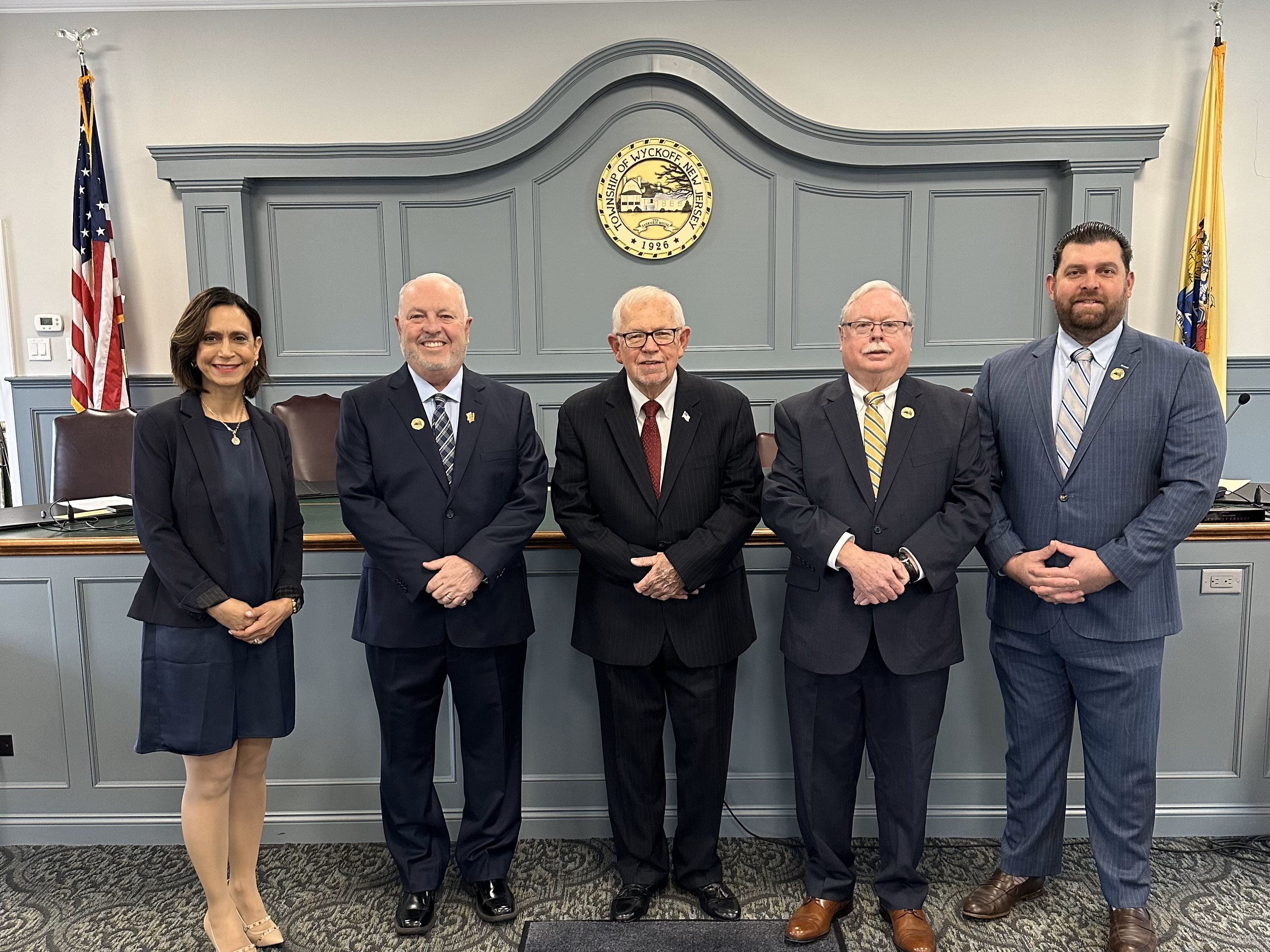
Wyckoff's Township Committee circa 2025. From left to right: Mae Bogdansky, Roger Lane, Rudy Boonstra, Tom Madigan and Peter Melchionne.

Wyckoff is governed under the Township form of New Jersey municipal government, one of 141 municipalities (of the 564) statewide that use this form, the second-most commonly used form of government in the state. The Township Committee is comprised of five members, who are elected on a partisan basis as part of the November general election, with either one or two seats up for vote each year in a three-year cycle. At an annual reorganization meeting, the Township Committee selects a chairperson from among its members who serves as mayor, and another member to serve as deputy mayor. The committee serves as Wyckoff's legislative and executive body, with the mayor responsible for chairing meetings and signing documents on behalf of the township.

As of 2025, the members of the Wyckoff Township Committee are Mayor Rudolf E. Boonstra Jr. (R, term ends 2025; one year term as mayor ends 2025), Mae Y. Bogdansky (R, 2027), Roger Lane (R, 2026; elected November 2024 to complete an unexpired term) and Peter J. Melchionne (R, 2026), with one seat expiring in 2027 remaining vacant.

The seat expiring in December 2027 held by Thomas J. Madigan, who had served on the committee since 2010 and had been mayor for two one-year terms, became vacant following hos death in October 2025.

=== Township politics ===
==== 2006 ====
In November 2006, voters approved a ballot measure establishing the Municipal Open Space Tax to support a Municipal Open Space Fund. Authorized for five years, the tax is an annual levy of a half cent per every $100 assessed valuation. The Municipal Open Space Fund is used to "...[acquire] lands for recreation, and conservation purposes," develop and maintain these lands, "...[acquire] farmland for...preservation purposes," and preserve and acquire, "...historic properties, structures, facilities, sites, [etc.]". In 2011, 2016, and 2021, Wyckoff voters reauthorized the tax and fund. The Russell Farms property was acquired by the township in 2012 for $3.1 million, using $1.2 million from the Municipal Open Space Fund and $1.85 million from a county grant awarded through the Bergen County Open Space Program; Republican mayor Chris DePhillips said the purchase was "...an historic moment for the township".

==== 2007 ====
In the June 2007 Republican primary, committeeman Henry J. McNamara (with 917 votes) defeated challenger Diane Sobin (who earned 713 votes). 17.35% of Wyckoff Republicans turned out for the primary. Afterwards, Sobin launched a write-in campaign against McNamara. In September 2007, McNamara announced that he would not run for re-election due to work commitments, prompting the Bergen County Republican Party's committee on Wyckoff to nominate Rudy Boonstra as their general election candidate. At the time of nomination, Boonstra was chairman of the township's Board of Adjustment (a position he had served in since 1997) as well as chairman of the Bergen County Republican Party that had selected him; Boonstra had lived in Wyckoff his entire life, and had served on the township's Board of Education for 13 years as well as the Ramapo Indian Hills Board of Education for nine.

Sobin continued her write-in campaign on the basis that, "...the township is run by a small circle of friends and relatives, [including] Boonstra," which, according to Sobin's husband, was evidenced by Boonstra's cousin, Harold Galenkamp, being a township committeeman at the time as well as the fact that, "...[Boonstra's extended] family are likely the largest developers of real estate in Wyckoff," owning, "about 60 acres". Meanwhile, the Democratic candidate, Christopher Hillmann, campaigned on Wyckoff purchasing open space and Boonstra advocated for an ordinance that would limit the size of buildings allowed on a given lot. In the November race for one three-year term on the township committee, Boonstra (with 1,866 votes) overcame 1,032 write-in votes cast in opposition and also defeated Hillmann (who earned 754 votes). 35.98% of Wyckoff voters turned out for the election.

==== 2008 ====
In the November 2008 election, Brian Scanlan became the first Democrat to win a seat on Wyckoff's township committee in 75 years, edging out planning board member Republican Kathleen Scarpelli in a race that was close enough to require that provisional ballots be counted: Republican committeeman David Connolly (with 4,670 votes) and Scanlan (with 4,506) defeated Kathleen Scarpelli (who earned 4,486 votes) and Democrat Brian Hubert (who earned 4,402) in the race for two terms on the committee, which 81.59% of Wyckoff voters turned out for.

Scanlan had first become active in Wyckoff politics in 2005 when he organized a public protest against the proposed development of 99 units on eight acres of the Deep Voll Ravine property; Scanlan fought for a public park on the site, though the Township compromised by approving an alternative plan of nine homes on 13 acres. According to Marsha Stoltz (writing for The Record), Scanlan, "...won public approval for his advocacy and stunned the Republican stronghold when he was elected".

During the 2008 campaign, the Democrats criticized Wyckoff's one-party rule, with Scanlan stating, "We think that the township would be better off if there were alternate points of view," and suggesting that the committee had ignored dissenting voices — leading to local decisions such as a new Wyckoff Stop & Shop being approved that the pair claimed was, "too large and ugly"; committeeman Connolly countered that, "...governing on the local level is about knowing the community," and, "On the local level it is not true [that one-party rule is bad]," as, "Politics is personal".

==== 2009 ====
In the November 2009 election, the Republican slate of Chris DePhillips (with 3,696 votes) and zoning board chairman Kevin Rooney (with 3,548) defeated Democrat Brian Hubert (who earned 2,597 votes) and independent Diane Sobin (who earned 2,131) in a race for two three-year terms opened by mayor Joseph Fiorenzo and committeeman Richard Alnor deciding not to run for re-election. 56.61% of Wyckoff voters turned out for the election.

Both teams campaigned on improving committee openness, Smart Growth, fiscal conservatism (with DePhillips and Rooney emphasizing shared services), and open-space preservation (though the Republicans qualified their support as for "economically prudent" preservation). Hubert and Sobin argued that their opponents were "late" to some of these issues (as Sobin, "...[while] point[ing] to her track record regarding open space...question[ed] her opponents' sincerity...saying that neither signed [the] petition to put a municipal open space tax on the ballot"), characterized them as part of the township's "entrenched" Republican establishment (saying they were "handpicked" by Republicans on the Township Committee), suggested there was a need for differing views on the committee, and specifically advocated for televised committee meetings. DePhillips and Rooney, meanwhile, contended that they brought fresh perspectives, were especially focused on responding to voters' concerns (as evidenced by their estimation that they "...knocked on 80 to 90 percent of doors in the township"), sought to "preserve the character" of Wyckoff, hoped to work closely with township schools, and stated that, "The suggestion is out there that we are...an extension of entrenched incumbents...[but] the incumbents had nothing to do with our running".

==== 2010 ====
In the June 2010 Republican primary, committeeman Rudy Boonstra, serving for the year as mayor, was challenged by Rev. Jeffrey Boucher, a pastor at Wyckoff's Powerhouse Christian Church, for nomination as the party's committee candidate in the general election. Boonstra touted his long history of volunteering and serving on committees in Wyckoff as well as his role in ongoing land-use agreements whereas Boucher pointed to his work growing Powerhouse and the "vision" a non-profit leader can bring to government. In April 2010, Boonstra formally protested Boucher's nominating petition with the county superintendent of elections, pointing out that not every signature had been individually witnessed and that the certifier had not been a Wyckoff resident at the time of validating the petition; Boucher characterized the legal challenge as "beneath him" and an attempt to, "...take the choice away from the people". Boonstra (with 1,020 votes) fended off Boucher (who earned 520 votes) in a primary that 34.77% of Wyckoff Republicans turned out for.

In October 2010, Republican Tom Madigan, a prolific local volunteer and 12-year Ramapo Indian Hills Board of Education member, was appointed to serve for the remaining one year of what had been Republican committeeman Dave Connolly's term until his resignation. Connolly, appointed to the committee in 2004, was the longest serving member currently on the committee at the time of his departure. Connolly's tenure included time as chairman of the finance committee and as the Environmental Commission liaison; he cited family priorities as his reason for resigning.

In the November 2010 election, Republican committeeman Rudy Boonstra (with 3,691 votes) won re-election to a second term over Democratic challenger Henry Velez (who earned 2,086 votes). 34.77% of Wyckoff voters turned out for the election. During the campaign, Boonstra stressed his experience, touted his fiscal conservatism (including having successfully refunded $300,000 in surplus library funds to taxpayers), supported open-space preservation (specifically pointing to Russell Farms and Maple Lake), opposed high-density COAH housing, pledged to align future projects like the Christian Health Care Center and ShopRite with Wyckoff's "small town charm", and advocated for pursuing grants to be used for township parks and recreation improvements; Velez promoted the proposed Christian Health Care Center as a "win-win" that provided open space as well as high-density senior housing, promised to address traffic and road safety issues, and expressed concern over Wyckoff's affordability — especially for seniors and individuals on a fixed income.

==== 2011 ====
In the November 2011 election, Democratic committeeman Brian Scanlan and a Republican ticket of committeeman Tom Madigan and Zoning Board chairman Doug Christie competed for two seats on the committee. Scanlan (with 2,589 votes) won re-election to his second term and Christie (with 2,179) won his first, denying Tom Madigan (who earned 1,921 votes) re-election. 37.61% of Wyckoff voters turned out for the election.

During the campaign, Scanlan promoted his efforts to limit the municipal tax increase to 1.2% annually, supported shared services, touted his initiatives that included having Wyckoff participate in state sustainability programs and passing an ordinance allowing outdoor dining, and "strongly" endorsed the renewal of the Open Space Trust Fund via ballot measure. The Republicans stressed their fiscal conservatism as well as advocated for shared services; supported the Fair School Funding Plan (in opposition to New Jersey's equity-focused school funding formula), which they claimed would have, "...increas[ed] Wyckoff's state education aid from 2 percent to over 15 percent"; and criticized how, "New Jersey Democrats forced Council on Affordable Housing mandates," which they pledged to, "...vigorously oppose...[to] fight to maintain Wyckoff's small-town charm". Madigan had appeared in court in October 2011 over allegations that he slapped a 17-year-old at a Ramapo High School football game in 2010; in November 2011 (after the election) Madigan was found guilty of simple assault, but a state superior court judge overturned this ruling in April 2012.

==== 2012 ====
In May 2012, former committeeman Tom Madigan was appointed to a one-year position on the township's zoning board. Committeeman Brian Scanlan, the lone Democrat serving at the time, was left out of appointment discussions despite being the liaison to the zoning board. Scanlan criticized "the absence of process" in the decision and suggested (while praising Madigan's record of volunteerism), "I would have liked to have cast a wider net in terms of filling this appointment," such as considering interested candidates who held post-graduate degrees in city planning; committeemen Doug Christie and Kevin Rooney defended Madigan by pointing to his "diligence" and how he, "understands the community...what we try to achieve here".

In June 2012, Wyckoff received bids for its annual tree and leaf removal services that, in light of a busy season for tree companies, were (at the lowest) more than double the cost of the previous year. Afterwards, Republican committeeman Kevin Rooney (alongside Scott Fisher, head of the Wyckoff Department of Public Works) spearheaded a successful effort for the township to purchase its own tree-service machinery and, thereafter, run the operation internally via the DPW. Democratic committeeman Brian Scanlan, who helped arrange funding for the deal as a member of the finance committee, estimated that the initial investment would pay for itself over two years; Rooney speculated that with further investment in the program Wyckoff taxpayers could collectively save $100,000.

In October 2012, the Township Committee passed an ordinance penalizing "objectionable public displays of behavior" with a $500 fine and up to 90-days imprisonment in an effort to preserve Wyckoff's "small-town charm". Some residents criticized the ordinance as vague, an overstep, and/or apt for litigation; township attorney Robert Landel, meanwhile, defended it, noting that most, "...undesirable behavior is handled as a disorderly persons offense," and the ordinance, "...is one more vehicle to write a summons".

In the November 2012 election, Republican committeeman Kevin Rooney and political newcomer Haakon Jepsen, an analyst at Deutsche Bank, ran as a ticket against Democratic challenger and Wyckoff public school teacher Eileen Avia for two seats on the committee; Republican mayor Chris DePhillips decided not to run for re-election. When asked by the Wyckoff Suburban News what the "single most important issue facing residents" was, the Republicans replied that keeping taxes low was their main concern, saying, "Wyckoff has a winning fiscal record thanks to its long legacy of Republican leadership," and claiming they had the "vision" and "experience" necessary to maintain Wyckoff's history of, "...some of the lowest taxes and highest property values in Bergen County"; Avia also raised property taxes as the most important issue in the election, though she went on to caution against, "...attempting to reign in property taxes with overdevelopment," as she argued it could endanger Wyckoff's "small town feel", natural environment, and traffic safety as well as intensify trends she viewed as encapsulated in, "Overbuilding...[having] transformed our town center into a vast, paved lanscape with no aesthetic merit". Jepsen additionally ran on "tapping into" Wyckoff's culture through programs and events and enhancing communication between Wykoffians and the committee, while Avia broached affordability issues for senior citizens, emphasized shared services and trimming the school budget, and supported increased police funding as well as, specifically, televised committee meetings. Rooney (with 5,129 votes) and Jepsen (with 4,721) defeated Avia (who earned 3,578 votes). 73.76% of Wyckoff voters turned out for the election.

==== 2013 ====
In June 2013, the Committee tabled an ordinance proposed by Democratic committeeman Brian Scanlan that would have banned smoking in public areas (such as parks, outside municipal buildings like firehouses and the library, and in municipal outdoor recreation areas) and also would have codified Board of Education policies prohibiting smoking outside schools. Some residents argued that the proposed ordinance was an overreach, both legally and in principle; the Committee decided the proposal would create an "unjustified burden" for adults while Republican committeeman Haakon Jepsen led criticism of the proposal amongst officials, saying, "The more I looked at it, the less I liked it," and Republican committeeman Kevin Rooney added, "Who are we trying to protect?". In July 2013, a slightly different ordinance was reintroduced and, in August, passed — with its changes being the exclusion of parking lots and roadways into parks from the ban's purview as well as the addition of the newly-public Russell Farms Community Park and Larkin House properties.

In the November 2013 election, Republican Committeeman Rudy Boonstra ran unopposed for re-election to his third term. He received 3,498 votes, with 44.61% of Wyckoff voters turning out for the election.

Committeeman Kevin J. Rooney won the 2013 version of the Food Network series Chopped, donating his $10,000 winnings to Oasis—A Haven for Women and Children based in Paterson.

==== 2014 ====
In the November 2014 election, Democratic committeeman Brian Scanlan (with 3,204 votes) and Republican mayor Doug Christie (with 2,808) won re-election (to their third and second terms, respectively) over Republican challenger — a member of the zoning board and owner of a Wyckoff small business, Yudin's Appliances — Susan Yudin (who earned 2,394 votes). 46.55% of Wyckoff voters turned out for the election.

Scanlan campaigned on many of the same issues that he had raised in the 2011 race, but in 2014 he additionally touted how he was the first committee member to refuse the position's stipend, declined entry into the offered state pension plan, and turned down PBA cards. Yudin advocated for including a woman's perspective on the all-male committee and, after being defeated, vowed to, "'throw my hat in the ring' again".

==== 2015 ====
In June 2015, Wyckoff Board of Education and Zoning Board member John Carolan was appointed to the Township Committee following Republican committeeman Doug Christie's May 2015 resignation due to moving out of town.

In June 2015, The Pulis Field Recreation Complex, an outdoor artificial turf field located behind the Wyckoff YMCA, was opened; its funding came from donations and fundraisers but mostly from the Wyckoff YMCA itself. Recently resigned committeeman Doug Christie declared that the committee's work to construct the field was his proudest accomplishment, saying, "...when I became mayor in 2013, I brought everyone together and it started to happen". In September 2015, the township committee unanimously approved allocating $300,000 from the Municipal Open Space Fund to light the complex. Given these upgrades, residents of the nearby 55-plus community, Spring Meadow, voiced concerns about noise and light pollution as well as traffic congestion; the president of the Wyckoff Environmental Commission, Harriet Shugarman, suggested that while, "...open space funds can be used on recreation, she hoped it would be used in the future to preserve open space". In March 2018, the township committee renamed one field in the complex (previously called Pulis Field 3) to Ben Landel Memorial Field in honor of a Wyckoff 18 year old (and son of Robert Landel, the township attorney) who died in January following a nine-month battle with an aggressive cancer, NUT midline carcinoma.

In the June 2015 Republican primaries, mayor Kevin Rooney and 2014 candidate Susan Yudin ran unopposed for nomination as the party's general election Township Committee ticket; Republican committeeman Haakon Jepsen decided not to run for a second term. Former Republican committeeman Tom Madigan, meanwhile, gathered signatures for a petition to run as an independent in the November competition. Yudin launched a failed effort to invalidate this petition (and thereby remove Madigan from the general election ballot), alleging, in a number of suits that eventually reached state superior court, that Madigan had not personally witnessed each signature. Upon Yudin's motion being denied, Madigan characterized her actions as amounting to a, "...baseless claim that she should be permitted to run unopposed," and stated that because, "...Yudin had a high-priced Bergen County Republican Organization lawyer while I was my own counsel," the suit's failure was, "...a win for the little guy".

In the November 2015 general election, Susan Yudin and mayor Kevin Rooney as Republicans and Tom Madigan as an independent competed for two three-year terms while Republican committeeman John Carolan ran unopposed for election to the remaining two years of the term he been appointed to in June. Rooney (with 1,996 votes) and Madigan (with 1,735) won re-election and election over Yudin (who earned 1,295 votes); John Carolan also won election, earning 1,792 votes, while 26.99% of Wyckoff voters turned out for the election.

When asked by the media what the most important issue facing Wyckoff was, Carolan responded that maintaining fiscally-conservative local government and using his position to nurture a positive community through "...programs that advocate outstanding schools, wellness, acceptance, and recreation," were most critical; Madigan brought up taming property taxes (the increase in which he blamed, partially, on the township receiving little state aid) through shared services and relying on local volunteers; Rooney cited an impetus to face "increasing challenges from...unfunded state and county mandates, COAH housing obligations, increased traffic...and [decaying] infrastructure," while championing Wyckoff's sense of community; and Yudin raised keeping taxes low as her primary objective, which she believed could be achieved through, "...more transparency in [local] government," such as, "Televising meetings of the Township Committee and land use boards, advertising for open positions in township jobs and vacancies on boards...[banning] nepotism in township jobs, and rotating the position of mayor among all Township Committee members".

==== 2016 ====
In the November 2016 election, Republican committeeman Rudy Boonstra ran unopposed for his fourth term and earned 5,665 votes. 76.43% of Wyckoff voters turned out for the election.

==== 2017 ====
At the January 2017 reorganization meeting, the Committee selected Republican Rudy Boonstra to act as mayor for the year, passing over Democrat Brian Scanlan despite his never having been selected (though he was entering his ninth year on the body) and the fact that he had served as deputy mayor in 2016 (a role which, in seven of the prior 10 years, resulted in the serving member being chosen as mayor the following year). According to local media, skipping over Scanlan for the position was part of continued efforts by, "The committee's four Republican members...to relegate Scanlan to minor committees and subordinate roles," and resulted in a year of residential protests, including Wyckoffians submitting letters-to-the-editor to patch.com and The Record.

Eventually, in July 2017, Wyckoff resident Steve Joern submitted a petition (with over 900 Wyckoffians' signatures) to the township committee that proposed a ballot question be added to the November election which would have asked residents if a nonpartisan subcommittee should be established to explore alternative methods for selecting the mayor, "...including a direct election...by the voters of Wyckoff". In August, the committee voted to deny the ballot question's addition but, in response, immediately created a subcommittee of Scanlan and independent committeeman Tom Madigan to investigate Wyckoff's electoral options. After one of the three scheduled subcommittee meetings transpired and the mayor-selection process had become a local election issue, Scanlan stated, "It's clear to me that [the Republicans] don't want to consider any alternatives to the current system," while Madigan retorted, "Brian Scanlan obviously is not putting his partisanship aside".

In January 2018, the Madigan-Scanlan subcommittee released its report, making three recommendations — the most crucial of which proposed eliminating the deputy mayor position and the expectations it sets. The subcommittee agreed that fundamentally changing the township-government structure to a different one appropriate for Wyckoff's size would grant too much power to the mayor and/or town manager; Scanlan, however, included his hopes for non-partisan elections in the report and suggested passing an ordinance to have the mayoral selection tied to which committee member had received the most votes in the previous election, whereas Madigan praised the current form of government, suggesting it incubated sufficiently bipartisan elections.

Also at the January 2017 reorganization meeting, the Committee appointed Republican Timothy Shanley to fill the seat expiring in December 2018 that had been held by committeeman Kevin Rooney until he resigned from office to fill the vacant Assembly seat that had been held by Scott Rumana.

In the November 2017 election, four candidates — Republican candidate Hayley Rooney (the wife of former-committeeman and then-assemblyman Kevin Rooney) and committeeman John Carolan as well as Democratic newcomer Melissa Rubenstein and committeeman Brian Scanlan — ran for two three-year terms on the committee, whereas Republican committeeman Tim Shanley and Democratic challenger Carla Pappalardo competed for the remaining one year of the term Shanley had been appointed to in January; the three Democrats ran under the slogan "One Wyckoff". Scanlan (with 3,340 votes) was elected to his fourth term while Rubenstein (with 2,893) defeated Carolan (who earned 2,809 votes) and Rooney (who earned 2,788); provisional ballots had to be counted because of how close Rubenstein and Carolan's vote totals were. Meanwhile, Shanley (with 2,983 votes) defeated Pappalardo (who earned 2,894). 49.72% of Wyckoff voters turned out for the election.

The township's election procedures emerged as campaign issues in 2017, as Scanlan (despite sitting on a subcommittee responsible for delivering a report on the subject in December) and Pappalardo called for Wyckoff to change its government from partisan to non-partisan as well as for having residents directly elect the mayor; the opposing ticket and other local Republicans criticized changing the township government in any way, arguing that Bergen County towns with non-partisan governments (such as Ridgewood and Hackensack) are "dysfunctional", have a high tax rate, and are "some of the worst run towns in New Jersey". The Democrats additionally supported videotaping committee meetings while Rubenstein individually advocated for full-day kindergarten throughout the township. The Record characterized the competition for the partisan balance of power on the committee as "a noisy contest" while mayor Rudy Boonstra said, "...passions [were] running...high". Democrats saw wins throughout the state in 2017, but Rubenstein and Pappalardo claimed the party's success in Wyckoff had "more to do with" Scanlan and his legacy; Rubenstein called her win a "Brian victory" while Pappalardo said that Wyckoff is, "...still a Republican stronghold. Brian was the engine, and I was the caboose"; Scanlan, instead, believed Democrats' local gains were a backlash against, "...partisanship at the national level".

==== 2018 ====
At the January 2018 reorganization meeting, committeeman Brian Scanlan was unanimously chosen as Wyckoff's first Democratic mayor and no deputy mayor was selected. Rubenstein, Scanlan's running mate, was also sworn in, becoming the second Democrat in over 80 years, second woman, and first Jewish person to serve on the committee.

In August 2018, Republican committeeman Tom Madigan proposed a resolution formally opposing Gov. Phil Murphy's campaign pledge to make New Jersey a sanctuary state. During the committee meeting, Madigan cited the murder of Mollie Tibbetts while Democratic committeewoman Melissa Rubenstein criticized his use of statistics from the Federation for American Immigration Reform. Politico wrote an article describing the situation in Wyckoff as a case study for how "the national debate over legal and illegal immigration [was] playing out at the local level, where governments have little role in enforcing federal immigration policy."

During the 2018 election cycle, three candidates — incumbent Republican Tim Shanley and incumbent Tom Madigan (who, after running as an independent in 2015, now filed as a Republican) as well as Democratic challenger Carla Pappalardo — ran for two seats on the township committee. In November, Shanley (with 5,107 votes) was elected to his first full term and Madigan (with 4,667) was re-elected to his second consecutive term, defeating Pappalardo (who earned 3,705 votes). 68.61% of Wyckoff voters turned out for the election.

Pappalardo was endorsed by Congressman and Wyckoff-resident Josh Gottheimer, mayor Brian Scanlan, and Wyckoff-resident Steve Joern, who launched a petition to rethink the township's electoral processes in 2017; in his endorsement, Joern wrote that, "...if Carla Pappalardo is elected...she will help move [the petition's goals] forward...she will respond to the many voices in Wyckoff asking to be heard, including on the mayoral vote issue".

In a letter-to-the-editor submitted to patch.com, Pappalardo stated that her platform consisted of efficient spending, improved water quality, and increased committee transparency through televised meetings — which she claimed her opponents opposed — as well as through ending "political board appointments" and "nepotism"; in the letter Pappalardo also said, "If elected, I look forward to working closely with Rudy Boonstra, Tim Shanley, Melissa Rubenstein, and Brian Scanlan and creating a high functioning team". This prompted Republican committeeman Rudy Boonstra to compose his own letter-to-the-editor where he responded, "I feel her statement...is a bit presumptuous as we do not know each other...[and] she has not attended one Township Committee meeting this year," going further to allege that, "...at a recent Ramapo Indian Hills Board Of Education meeting...she referred to Wyckoff as, 'a cheap-a** Dutch town'," which he interpreted, "...as an ethnic slur aimed at me and members of my family who have served Wyckoff well for decades in numerous capacities".

==== 2019 ====
In April 2019 the Township Committee approved the 2019 municipal budget, which included $307,150 in funding that was partially dedicated to establishing the technology necessary to record future meetings and make them available online.

In May 2019, Committeewoman Melissa Rubenstein, who had been elected in 2017 as a Democrat, switched her party affiliation to Republican.

In June 2019, a controversy emerged over whether Wyckoff should fly the gay pride flag at town hall. Republican Mayor Tom Madigan denied calls from residents and local activists, including a petition with over 1000 signatures and a 100-person rally, citing concerns that flying the flag could create a public forum where the town could be forced to recognize any cause. A year later, in June 2020, Republican Mayor Tim Shanley led the township committee in flying the pride flag on a pole near the library on the same municipal lot as town hall; Republican committeeman Rudy Boonstra abstained from the flag-raising ceremony, and Shanley accused Madigan, now a committeeman, of saying he "wanted no ceremony," and "to strike 'proudly' from the resolution supporting the cause when we passed it this year".

In the November 2019 election, Republican committeeman Rudy Boonstra (with 2,530 votes) won re-election to his fifth term over Democratic challenger David Mangot (who earned 1,415 votes). 30.71% of Wyckoff voters turned out for the election.

Democratic committeeman Brian Scanlan resigned on election day in November 2019 with a year remaining in his fourth term; he cited a desire to work on a national climate change agenda, reflecting the environmental causes he had championed during his tenure. Mayor Tom Madigan said of the resignation that he was "surprised" and "disappointed" because he believed Scanlan announced on election day "to upstage both local candidates".

In December 2019, Beth Fischer was chosen to fill Scanlan's seat for the remaining one year of what had been his term; this was the first time two women served simultaneously on Wyckoff's township committee (the other being Melissa Rubenstein), and Fischer (who was, at the time, commissioner of the Wyckoff Environmental Commission) pledged to carry on Scanlan's legacy of environmental activism.

==== 2020 ====
In November 2020, Republican Peter Melchionne won election to his first term and Republican committeewoman Melissa Rubenstein won re-election to her second term (with 6,269 and 6,342 votes, respectively) over the Democratic slate — Lisa Eidel and committeewoman Beth Fischer (who earned 4,548 and 4,717 votes).

When campaigning, Fischer touted her history of volunteerism, commitment to environmental issues, and an effective first year on the committee; Eidel asserted a need for differing perspectives on the committee (especially in light of Rubenstein's party switch) and to focus on urban planning; Melchionne claimed, "Our opponents want to change Wyckoff the town we call home" and promised, instead, to improve and maintain fundamental aspects of the township like local businesses, recreation, and safety; and Rubenstein similarly stated that, "Our opponents believe that Wyckoff needs to change" and she named utilities quality and reliability as her chief concern. Additionally, Eidel received attention for her social advocacy, including playing a leading role in pushing Wyckoff to fly the gay pride flag and speaking at a June 2020 "rally for equality" that was organized after a local Chinese restaurant was vandalized with racially-charged graffiti; at the rally, Eidel stated, "I'm a gay woman with two Black sons in a white community...if I don't stand up to the fact that there's racism in this town, who is going to?". Fischer was the only committee member to attend the rally, and Eidel alleged that Republican mayor Tim Shanley had been asked twice by organizers to speak at the event — but that he failed to answer.

Upon Melchionne's taking office in January 2021, Wyckoff had an all-Republican township committee for the first time since 2009.

==== 2021 ====
In August 2021 the township committee voted to move Wyckoff Board of Education elections from November to April, claiming that, in part because April elections would allow residents a direct vote on the school budget, the move would increase Board of Education transparency and accountability. The Board President criticized the committee's vote as a "highly political" decision that would "adversely affect the quality of education in Wyckoff", and others cited concerns about lower voter turnout in April elections. In September 2021, the Wyckoff Board of Education voted to move the election back to November.

In September 2021, former chairman of the Bergen County Republican Organization Committee Bob Yudin launched a write-in campaign against Republican township committeeman Tom Madigan. Yudin argued that Madigan's role in moving the Wyckoff Board of Education elections from November to April was "a blatant attempt to reduce the voter turnout so Madigan and his minions will have a better chance to put their people into office", and he also attacked Madigan's character by citing a dismissed 2010 complaint that charged him with slapping a 17-year-old.

In November 2021, Madigan (with 4,130 votes) was re-elected to his third consecutive term and Republican committeeman Tim Shanley (with 5,292) won re-election to his second while 1,291 write-in votes were cast in opposition. 51.91% of Wyckoff voters turned out for the election and no Democrats ran.

==== 2022 ====
In the November 2022 election, Republican committeeman Rudy Boonstra ran unopposed for his sixth term and earned 4,867 votes. 55.64% of Wyckoff voters turned out for the election.

==== 2023 ====
In January 2023, Scott Fisher, the former manager of the township's public works department, was appointed to fill the seat expiring in December 2023 that had been held by Melissa Rubenstein until she resigned from office the previous month.

At the 2023 Ramapo Indian Hills Board of Education reorganization meeting, Republican committeeman Tom Madigan was called upon by board president Judith Sullivan; he stated that the newly constituted parents' rights majority on the Board was, "a breath of fresh air" and that, "...voters will be 'well served'".

In the November 2023 election, Republican committeeman Scott Fisher (with 3,094 votes) was elected to his first full term on Wyckoff's township committee while fellow Republican committeeman Peter Melchionne (with 3,039) was re-elected to his second. 34.81% of Wyckoff turned out for the election and both candidates ran unopposed.

==== 2024 ====
In January 2024, Roger Lane was unanimously approved to replace Scott Fisher on the township committee (through the November 2024 election) following Fisher's resignation "due to recent family matters" earlier in the month. Lane had previously served on the Ramapo Indian Hills Board of Education from 1999 to 2002 and was a New Milford councilman, and later mayor, throughout the 1980s.

Throughout spring 2024, Wyckoff Republicans campaigned in the lead up to a competitive June primary determining who would represent the party in the November township committee races — one race for two new three-year terms on the township committee and another to decide who would serve out the remaining two years of what had been Scott Fisher's term. In the two-seat contest, incumbent committeeman and former mayor Tim Shanley ran as a slate with Drita McNamara (head of the District 40 Republican committee and chairwoman of Wyckoff's delegation within the Bergen County Republican Organization) against the team of incumbent committeeman and former mayor Tom Madigan and Wyckoff Republican Club vice president Mae Bogdansky, whose husband was a member of the Ramapo Indian Hills Board of Education at the time. In the latter race, Christopher Joachim, a longtime Wyckoff volunteer firefighter, joined Shanley and McNamara's ticket to run against Roger Lane, who had served on the committee since his appointment in January, as Lane campaigned alongside Madigan and Bogdansky.

The Shanley, McNamara, and Joachim team was endorsed by the Bergen County Republican Organization and appeared on ballots' first column (the "party line" that tends to boost candidates) whereas Madigan, Bogdansky, and Lane organized alternatively as "Republicans for Wyckoff" and appeared on the second column, having been endorsed by Wyckoff mayor Pete Melchionne and committeeman Rudy Boonstra. The Record speculated that the local party split, especially between Madigan and Shanley who previously ran together in 2018 and 2021, was connected to cultural divides and potential "Concern about officials blurring the line that traditionally separates education and municipal government" — pointing to how Madigan and Bogdansky actively supported parents' rights board of education members, frequently speaking at meetings, and how Madigan campaigned, in his words, as a "believer in family values." During an interview with radio station New Jersey 101.5, Bogdansky said of divisions amongst Wyckoff Republicans that their opponents and local allies were, "...running under the platform of bringing the community together, yet they're not doing it...we have this little swamp growing...but we're gonna drain it really quick." Shanley's slate advocated for more-fiscally-conservative municipal borrowing and debt management plus increased communication between the committee and Wyckoff residents, ultimately framing their message as, "...keep[ing] the traditions of Wyckoff that have united us, and...bring[ing] us back to our roots and toward a better more unified tomorrow," while Madigan's ticket focused on increased school and pedestrian safety as well as support for first responders, replying to their opponent's statement that: "To say Wyckoff needs change or has lost it's [sic] values is insulting. The spirit of Wyckoff is strong...Our slate stands proud of Wyckoff's rich history."

In the June 2024 primary, Madigan (with 1,171 votes) and Bogdansky (with 1,167) defeated Shanley (who earned 950 votes) and McNamara (who earned 894), while Lane (with 1,140 votes) bested Joachim (who earned 934 votes).

In the November 2024 election, Mae Bogdansky, the Republican who defeated incumbent committeeman Tim Shanley to be the party's nominee, was elected (with 6,464 votes) to her first term on Wyckoff's township committee, while Republican committeeman Tom Madigan was elected (with 6,162) to his fourth consecutive term; they faced no Democratic opponents, but were challenged by independent candidate Sabaudin Skenderi (who earned 1,272 votes). Meanwhile, Republican committeeman Roger Lane was elected (with 6,570 votes) to serve the remaining two years of what had been Scott Fisher's term; he had no opponents on the ballot.

==== 2025 ====
In December 2024, the Township Committee assembled for a special meeting and voted 3-1-1 to suspend Pamela Steele, who had been Wyckoff's tax assessor since 1994. Committeeman Tom Madigan introduced and approved the motion, Rudy Boonstra and Roger Lane joined Madigan in approving, Pete Melchionne (who was mayor at the time) was absent due to pending personal tax negotiations with the township, and committeeman Tim Shanley was the lone vote against firing Steele — citing a legal memo the committee reviewed, which led Shanley to believe the action was illegal. Initially there was no explanation given for suspending Steele's position as Wyckoff's tax assessor. A week later, Wyckoff's labor attorney filed a petition with the county and state divisions of taxation to officially remove Steele from her role. This petition revealed that Steele was being suspended for working remotely following a lung cancer diagnosis, which the township alleged resulted in Steele being unable to meet with residents about tax issues "for an extended period of years," delaying property assessments for up to six years, and, overall, falling "woefully short of what is required for her position," thus causing "the loss of significant tax revenue to the Township." Following her suspension, Steele called the decision "an illegal, unlawful action," saying: "The allegations are unsupported and baseless" and "I will respond to their allegations through the appropriate channels." In January 2025, the New Jersey Division of Taxation and the Association of Municipal Tax Assessors (a labor union) filed complaints against Wyckoff over Steele's firing. The Division of Taxation then ordered the township to rescind the resolution passed on December 10, 2024, that first suspended Steele, declaring that their division, under the New Jersey Treasury Department, had sole jurisdiction over firing municipal assessors in New Jersey and that the resolution was "an attempt to circumvent" this process. Over the following two weeks, the Township Committee did not respond publicly, having formally refused to rescind the same resolution on December 31. On February 6, 2025, Steele filed a whistleblower lawsuit against Wyckoff and its mayor, Rudy Boonstra. In this lawsuit, Steele claimed she was allowed to work from home following her diagnosis in December 2021 through August 2024, at which point she was told to return to working in-person; she then appealed for more time working remotely and, over her tenure, had asked for raises in-line "with what other employees in her position had gotten." Ultimately the lawsuit claimed that the township had "subjected [her] to clear retaliation" by firing her after these requests.

In the November 2025 election, Republican committeeman Rudy Boonstra ran unopposed for his seventh term and earned 5,409 votes. 61.67% of Wyckoff voters turned out for the election.

=== Federal, state and county representation ===
Wyckoff is in the 5th Congressional District and is part of New Jersey's 40th state legislative district.

For the 119th United States Congress, New Jersey's 5th congressional district is represented by Josh Gottheimer (D, Wyckoff). New Jersey is represented in the United States Senate by Democrats Cory Booker (Newark, term ends 2027) and Andy Kim (Moorestown, term ends 2031).

For the 2026–2027 session, the 40th legislative district of the New Jersey Legislature is represented in the State Senate by Kristin Corrado (R, Totowa) and in the General Assembly by Al Barlas (R, Cedar Grove) and Christopher DePhillips (R, Wyckoff).

Bergen County is governed by a directly elected County Executive, with legislative functions performed by a Board of County Commissioners comprised of seven members who are elected at-large to three-year terms in partisan elections on a staggered basis, with either two or three seats coming up for election each November; a Chairman and Vice Chairman are selected from among its seven members at a reorganization meeting held every January. As of 2025, the county executive is James J. Tedesco III (D, Paramus), whose four-year term of office ends December 31, 2026.

Bergen County's Commissioners are Chair Mary J. Amoroso (D, Mahwah, 2025), Vice Chair Steven A. Tanelli (D, North Arlington, 2027), Chair Pro Tem Joan Voss (D, Fort Lee, 2026), Rafael Marte (D, Bergenfield, 2026), Germaine M. Ortiz (D, Emerson, 2025), Thomas J. Sullivan Jr. (D, Montvale, 2025) and Tracy Silna Zur (D, Franklin Lakes, 2027).

Bergen County's elected constitutional officials are Clerk John S. Hogan (D, Northvale, 2026), Sheriff Anthony Cureton (D, Englewood, 2027) and Surrogate Michael R. Dressler (D, Cresskill, 2026).

=== Politics ===
United States presidential election results for Wyckoff
Year	Republican		Democratic		Third party(ies)	
Year	No.	%	No.	%	No.	%
2024	5,628	53.71%	4,661	44.48%	189	1.80%
2020	5,814	50.69%	5,458	47.59%	198	1.73%
2016	5,257	53.79%	4,078	41.73%	438	4.48%
2012	5,867	64.34%	3,178	34.85%	74	0.81%
2008	5,851	59.56%	3,903	39.73%	69	0.70%
2004	5,990	62.97%	3,459	36.36%	63	0.66%

As of March 2011, there were a total of 11,809 registered voters in Wyckoff Township, of which 2,203 (18.7% vs. 31.7% countywide) were registered as Democrats, 4,504 (38.1% vs. 21.1%) were registered as Republicans and 5,099 (43.2% vs. 47.1%) were registered as Unaffiliated. There were 3 voters registered as Libertarians or Greens. Among the township's 2010 Census population, 70.7% (vs. 57.1% in Bergen County) were registered to vote, including 97.7% of those ages 18 and over (vs. 73.7% countywide).

In the 2020 presidential election, Republican Donald Trump received 5,814 votes (50.7% vs. 41.2% countywide), ahead of Democrat Joe Biden with 5,458 votes (47.6% vs. 57.7% countywide) and other candidates with 198 votes (1.7% vs. 1.1% countywide), among the 11,470 ballots cast by the township's 14,075 registered voters, for a turnout of 81.5% (vs. 75.1% in Bergen County). In the 2016 presidential election, Republican Donald Trump received 5,257 votes (53.8% vs. 41.1% countywide), ahead of Democrat Hillary Clinton with 4,078 votes (41.7% vs. 54.2%) and other candidates with 442 votes (4.5% vs. 4.6%), among the 9,888 ballots cast by the township's 12,937 registered voters, for a turnout of 76.4% (vs. 72.5% in Bergen County). In the 2012 presidential election, Republican Mitt Romney received 5,871 votes (64.0% vs. 43.5% countywide), ahead of Democrat Barack Obama with 3,183 votes (34.7% vs. 54.8%) and other candidates with 68 votes (0.7% vs. 0.9%), among the 9,168 ballots cast by the township's 12,430 registered voters, for a turnout of 73.8% (vs. 70.4% in Bergen County).

Gubernatorial election results for Wyckoff
Year	Republican		Democratic		Third party(ies)	
Year	No.	%	No.	%	No.	%
2025	4,911	57.28%	3,643	42.49%	20	0.23%
2021	4,403	59.63%	2,942	39.84%	39	0.53%
2017	3,282	58.78%	2,243	40.17%	59	1.06%
2013	3,958	75.00%	1,267	24.01%	52	0.99%
2009	4,288	63.34%	2,104	31.08%	378	5.58%
2005	3,723	62.30%	2,149	35.96%	104	1.74%

In the 2013 gubernatorial election, Republican Chris Christie received 75.0% of the vote (3,958 cast), ahead of Democrat Barbara Buono with 24.0% (1,267 votes), and other candidates with 1.0% (52 votes), among the 5,342 ballots cast by the township's 11,974 registered voters (65 ballots were spoiled), for a turnout of 44.6%.

United States Senate election results for Wyckoff1
Year	Republican		Democratic		Third party(ies)	
Year	No.	%	No.	%	No.	%
2024	5,732	55.85%	4,397	42.84%	134	1.31%
2018	4,239	60.94%	2,555	36.73%	162	2.33%
2012	5,152	61.73%	3,090	37.02%	104	1.25%
2006	4,296	64.18%	2,331	34.82%	67	1.00%

United States Senate election results for Wyckoff2
Year	Republican		Democratic		Third party(ies)	
Year	No.	%	No.	%	No.	%
2020	6,005	53.50%	5,104	45.47%	116	1.03%
2014	3,105	59.55%	2,053	39.37%	56	1.07%
2013	2,153	59.15%	1,463	40.19%	24	0.66%
2008	5,569	61.70%	3,368	37.31%	89	0.99%

== Education ==
The Wyckoff School District serves public students in pre-kindergarten through eighth grade. As of the 2020–21 school year, the district, comprised of five schools, had an enrollment of 1,932 students and 179.2 classroom teachers (on an FTE basis), for a student–teacher ratio of 10.8:1. Schools in the district (with 2020–21 enrollment data from the National Center for Education Statistics) are Calvin Coolidge Elementary School, with 289 students in grades K-5, Abraham Lincoln Elementary School, with 304 students in grades K-5, Sicomac Elementary School, with 297 students in grades PreK-5, George Washington Elementary School with 346 students in grades K-5 and Dwight D. Eisenhower Middle School, with 672 students in grades 6–8. Calvin Coolidge School, located at 420 Grandview Avenue, is an elementary school which opened in 1932 as a six-room K–6 school and has been expanded several times over the years. Eisenhower Middle School was approved in 1960 and dedicated 1963. Since 1993, Eisenhower has served grades 6 to 8. Abraham Lincoln School was dedicated in 1953 on land purchased in 1950. Sicomac School was completed in 1967. George Washington School was constructed as an 11-room brick building on the site where the previous school had burned down.

In the 2003–2004 school year, Eisenhower Middle School was recognized with the National Blue Ribbon School of Excellence Award from the United States Department of Education, the highest honor that an American school can achieve.

Public high school students from Wyckoff in ninth through twelfth grades attend the schools of the Ramapo Indian Hills Regional High School District, which also serves students from Franklin Lakes and Oakland. Students entering the district as freshmen have the option to attend either of the district's high schools, subject to a choice made during eighth grade. Schools in the district (with 2020–21 enrollment data from the National Center for Education Statistics) are Indian Hills High School, located in Oakland (919 students) and Ramapo High School, located in Franklin Lakes (1,285 students). The high school district's nine-member board of education oversees the operation of the district; seats on the board are allocated based on population, with four of the nine seats allocated to Wyckoff.

The first public school building in the township was a one-room schoolhouse constructed on Wyckoff Avenue in 1869 and used until 1906. Prior to 1929, high school students attended Paterson Central High School in Paterson, before the Board of Education voted to send students to Ramsey High School in Ramsey instead. Franklin Lakes, Oakland and Wyckoff (FLOW district) approved the creation of a regional high school in 1954 by a vote of 1,060 to 51, with Ramapo High School (in Franklin Lakes) opened in 1957 and Indian Hills High School in 1960.

Public school students from the township, and all of Bergen County, are eligible to attend the secondary education programs offered by the Bergen County Technical Schools, which include the Bergen County Academies in Hackensack, and the Bergen Tech campus in Teterboro or Paramus. The district offers programs on a shared-time or full-time basis, with admission based on a selective application process and tuition covered by the student's home school district.

Eastern Christian Middle School (ECMS) is a private Christian school with about 200 students in grades 6–8 that is a part of the Eastern Christian School Association.

Saint Elizabeth School serves children grades Pre-K–8, with an average of 30 kids in each grade and operates under the supervision of the Roman Catholic Archdiocese of Newark. The school was recognized in 2011 with the National Blue Ribbon Award of Excellence by the United States Department of Education.

== Emergency services ==
=== Fire department ===
Wyckoff has a fire department that was founded in 1907 and consists of three companies.

Company	Address	Apparatus
Wyckoff Fire Department Company #1	1 Scott Plaza	Battalion 1, R242, E234, E235, TL241, Rescue Boats
Wyckoff Community Engine Company #2	178 Wyckoff Avenue	Battalion 2, E231, E232,
Sicomac Engine Company #3	428 Sicomac Avenue	Battalion 3, E233, E236

=== Ambulance and police departments ===
Wyckoff has its own volunteer ambulance corps. It was established in 1926 and responded to over 1,000 calls in 2014. Wyckoff Police Department was established in 1922 and operates on a 24-hour basis.

In 2016, Wyckoff Chief of Police, Benjamin Fox, was suspended in August after emails condoning racial profiling of black people were publicized. Fox later resigned from the department and retired on December 1, in accordance with an agreement amongst township officials.

== Transportation ==
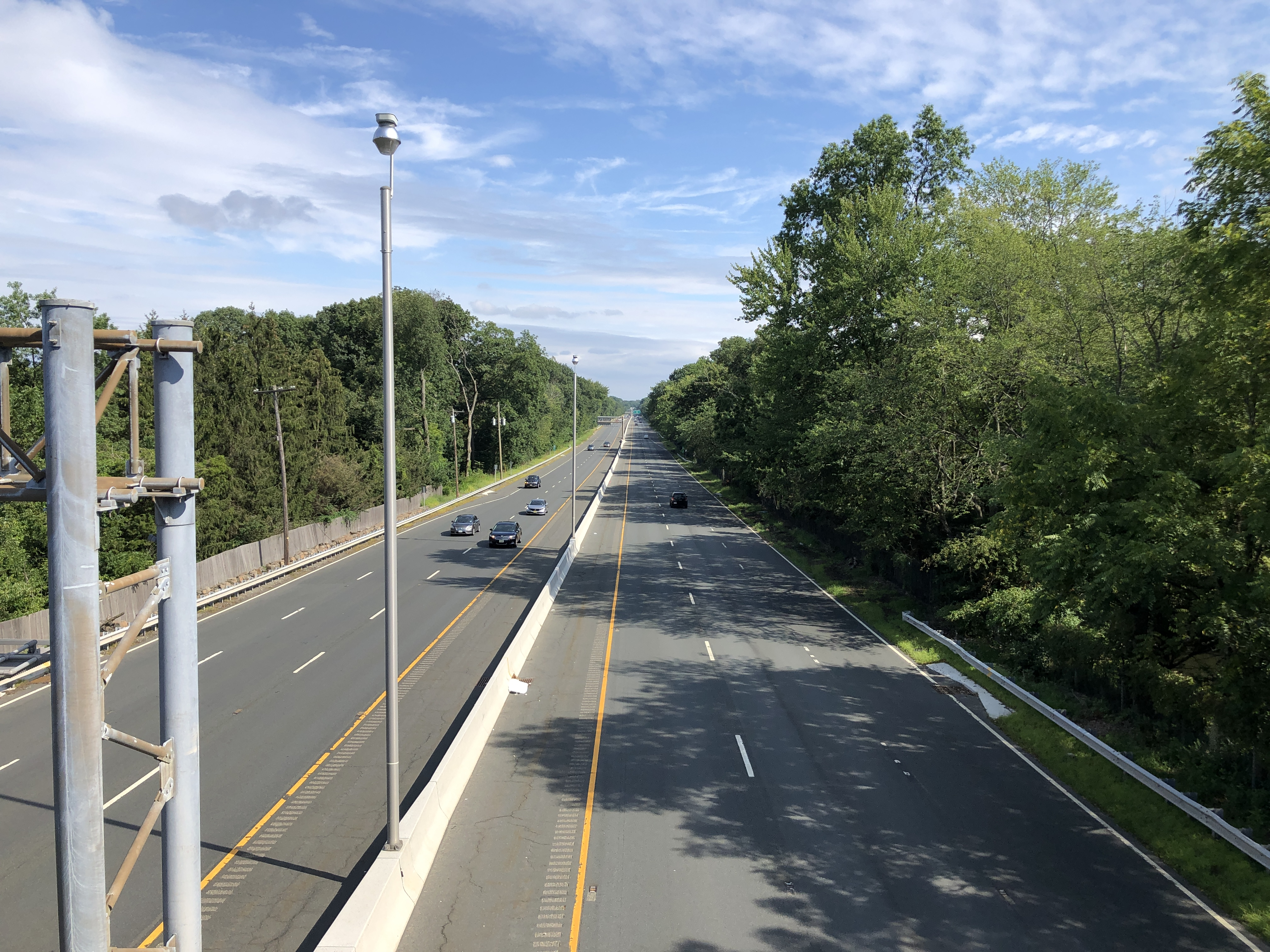
Route 208 southbound in Wyckoff

=== Roads and highways ===
As of May 2010, the township had a total of 92.04 miles (148.12 km) of roadways, of which 77.02 miles (123.95 km) were maintained by the municipality, 12.60 miles (20.28 km) by Bergen County and 2.42 miles (3.89 km) by the New Jersey Department of Transportation.

Route 208 heads northwest through the township, entering from Hawthorne in Passaic County and continuing 2.5 miles (4.0 km) before entering Franklin Lakes. County Route 502 (Franklin Avenue) enters from Franklin Lakes and runs east–west through the northern portion of the township for 2.0 miles (3.2 km) before entering Waldwick.

=== Public transportation ===
NJ Transit provides service on the 148 route to the Port Authority Bus Terminal in Midtown Manhattan and local bus service on the 722 route and on the 752 route, which operates between Oakland and Hackensack.

Bus service is also provided by Short Line Bus to the Port Authority Bus Terminal in Midtown Manhattan, with some buses providing service across 42nd Street to Second Avenue.

=== Historic rail service ===
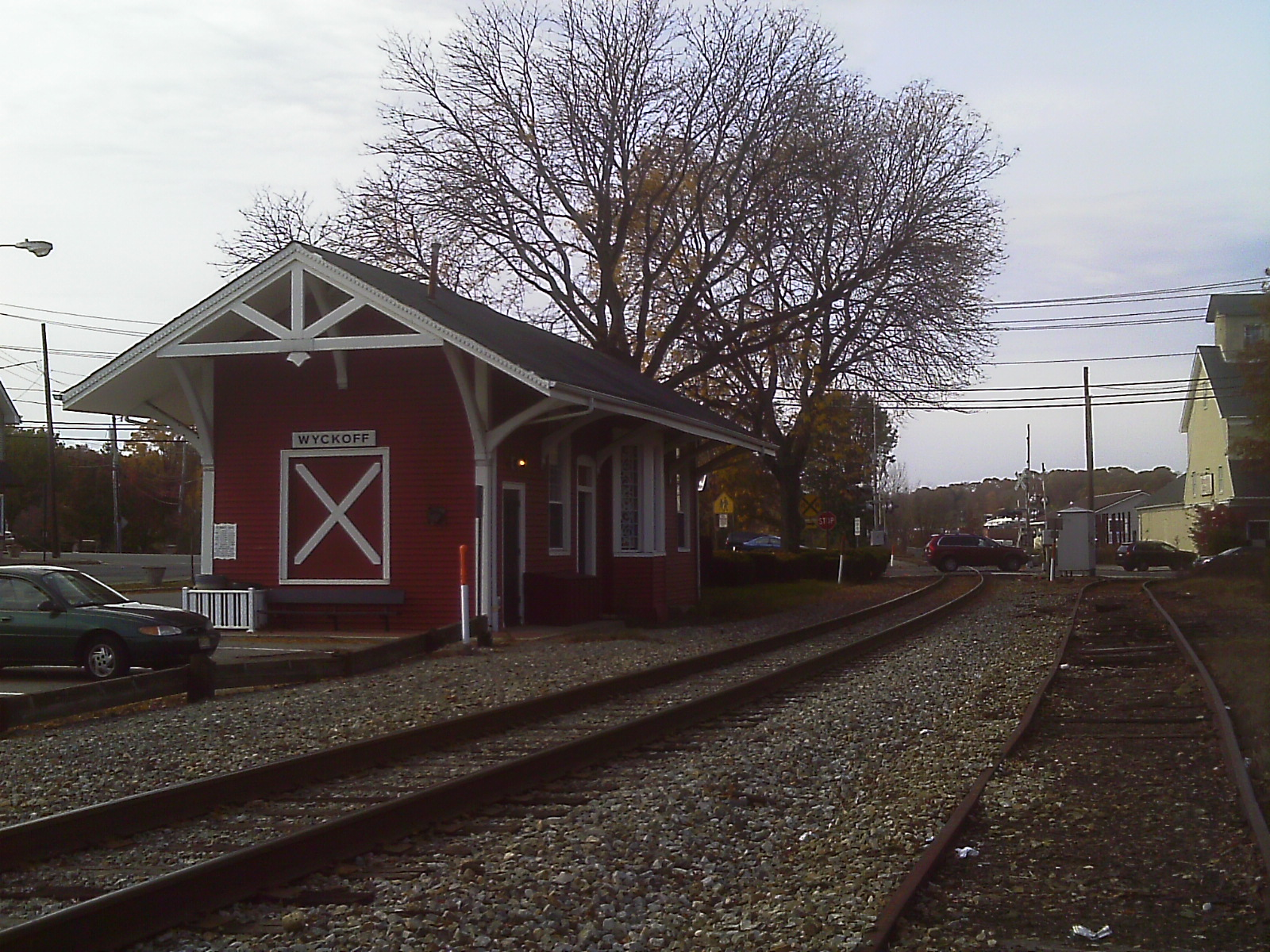
The former station at Wyckoff

The historic Wyckoff railroad station was built by the New Jersey Midland Railway around 1870 and later served passengers on the New York, Susquehanna and Western Railroad (NYS&W). until service was abruptly curtailed in 1966. Plans to restore service have not materialized. The township is a stop on the annual Toys for Tots train.

== Local media ==
Wyckoff is served by the Wyckoff Suburban News, a weekly community newspaper published by the North Jersey Media Group. The daily newspaper for the region is The Record which is also published by North Jersey Media Group.

== Houses of worship ==
Houses of worship in the township include:

- Abundant Life Reformed Church
- Advent Lutheran Church (Evangelical Lutheran Church in America)
- Bergen Christian Testimony Church
- Bethany Church (Assemblies of God)
- Cedar Hill Christian Reformed Church (Christian Reformed Church in North America), founded in 1990
- Cornerstone Christian Church
- Faith Community Christian (Christian Reformed Church in North America)
- Grace United Methodist Church (United Methodist Church) was established in Paterson in 1868 and relocated to Wyckoff in 1964.
- St. Barsawmo Syriac Orthodox Church (Syriac Orthodox Church) was founded in Mahwah in 1998 and relocated to Wyckoff in 2008.
- St. Elizabeth of Hungary Roman Catholic Church (Roman Catholic Church)
- St. Nicholas Greek Orthodox Church (Greek Orthodox Metropolis of New Jersey) was established in 1970 and opened at its current site in 1973.
- Temple Beth Rishon (an "independent, liberal, egalitarian Jewish congregation")
- Wyckoff Assembly of God
- Wyckoff Reformed Church (Reformed Church in America)

== Notable people ==
People who were born in, residents of, or otherwise closely associated with Wyckoff include: ((B) denotes that the person was born in Wyckoff).

- Tom Acker (1930–2021), former Major League Baseball pitcher who played for the Cincinnati Reds
- Paul Apostol (born 1945), fencer who competed in the individual and team sabre events at the 1972 and 1976 Summer Olympics
- Jillian Armenante (born 1968), actress who played the role of Donna Kozlowski on the TV show Judging Amy
- Theodore J. Bauer (1909–2005), former Assistant Surgeon General of the United States and head of the Centers for Disease Control and Prevention
- Marco Benevento (born 1977), jazz keyboardist and member of Benevento/Russo Duo
- Katrina Bowden (born 1988), actress on 30 Rock(B)
- Kirk DeMicco, screenwriter, director and producer, best known for writing and directing Space Chimps and The Croods
- Bucky Dent (born 1951), New York Yankees player, best known for home run that beat the Boston Red Sox on October 2, 1978, in a one-game tiebreaker to get to the playoffs
- Christopher DePhillips (born 1965), politician who has represented the 40th Legislative District in the New Jersey General Assembly since 2018
- Steve Doocy (born 1956), Fox News anchor on Fox & Friends
- Mary P. Easley, attorney, academic, and former university administrator who, as the wife of Governor Mike Easley, served as First Lady of North Carolina from 2001 to 2009
- Gertrude Ederle (1905–2003), first woman to swim the English Channel
- William W. Evans Jr. (1921–1999), politician who served as Mayor of Wyckoff and in the New Jersey General Assembly, who was a candidate for the Republican nomination for president in 1968
- Liam Fornadel (born 1999), guard who plays for the New England Patriots
- Marcel Gleyre (1910–1996), gymnast who competed in the men's vault event at the 1932 Summer Olympics
- Josh Gottheimer (born 1975), U.S. Representative for New Jersey's 5th congressional district, serving since 2017
- Vernon Greene (1908–1965), prolific cartoonist and illustrator who worked on several comic strips and was best known for his artwork on Bringing Up Father
- Amy Grossberg (born 1978), served nearly 37 months in jail for killing her baby with her boyfriend, Brian Peterson
- Morgan Hoffmann (born 1989), professional golfer
- Chris Hogan (born 1988), wide receiver who has played in the NFL for the New England Patriots
- Nancy Hower (born 1966), actress, director, screenwriter and producer, who had a recurring role as Ensign Samantha Wildman on the sci-fi series Star Trek: Voyager(B)
- Frankie Jonas (born 2000), actor, younger brother of the Jonas Brothers(B)
- Joe Jonas (born 1989), musician and member of the band Jonas Brothers
- Kevin Jonas (born 1987), musician and member of the band Jonas Brothers
- Nick Jonas (born 1992), musician and member of the band Jonas Brothers
- Dan Karaty (born 1976), television personality, producer, dancer and choreographer who has been a judge on So You Think You Can Dance
- Peter Kreeft (born 1937), philosopher and author of numerous popular books of Christian philosophy, theology, and apologetics(B)
- Artie Lewicki (born 1992), MLB pitcher for the Detroit Tigers
- Bruce Lundvall (1935–2015), record company executive, best known for his period as the president and CEO of the Blue Note Label Group, reporting directly to Eric Nicoli, the chief executive officer of EMI Group
- Tor Lundvall (born 1968), painter and musician
- Martha MacCallum (born 1964), news anchor on Fox News Channel(B)
- Constantine Maroulis (born 1975), singer/actor who was a finalist on American Idol season 4 in 2005
- Henry McNamara (1934–2018), member of the New Jersey Senate from 1985 to 2008 who served as Mayor of Wyckoff in 1979
- Sunny Mehta (born 1978), Assistant General Manager of the Florida Panthers, former professional poker player, trader, author, and musician
- Max Middendorf (born 1967), ice hockey center who played in the NHL for the Quebec Nordiques and Edmonton Oilers
- Rob Milanese (born 1980), professional football wide receiver / cornerback who played for the Philadelphia Soul in the Arena Football League
- Ezra Miller (born 1992), actor(B)
- John J. Mooney (1930–2020), chemical engineer who was co-inventor of the three-way catalytic converter
- Tim Pernetti (born 1970), Chief Business Officer of the Major League Soccer expansion club New York City FC who had been Director of Intercollegiate Athletics at Rutgers University between 2009 and 2013
- Brian Peterson, served two years in jail for killing his baby with his girlfriend, Amy Grossberg
- John R. Ramsey (1862–1933), represented New Jersey's 6th congressional district from 1917 to 1921(B)
- Tara Reid (born 1975), actress(B)
- Kevin J. Rooney (born 1960), politician who has represented the 40th Legislative District in the New Jersey General Assembly since 2016
- Greg Schiano (born 1966), former head coach of the Tampa Bay Buccaneers, former and current head coach of the Rutgers Scarlet Knights football team(B)
- John A. Spizziri (born 1934), politician who served in the New Jersey General Assembly from 1972 to 1978
- Robert B. Sturges, Florida businessman and former New Jersey government official.
- Melissa Sweet (born 1956), children's book writer and illustrator who is a Sibert Medal winner and two-time Caldecott Medal winner(B)
- Danny Tamberelli (born 1982), actor(B)
- Brian Toal (born 1985), professional football player(B)
- Al Vandeweghe (1920–2014), professional football player for the All-America Football Conference's Buffalo Bisons in 1946(B)
- Stuart Varney (born 1949), economics journalist who has appeared on the Fox News Channel and the Fox Business Network
- George Verwer (born 1938), founder of Operation Mobilisation, a Christian missions organization
- Chris Wragge (born 1970), news anchor on WCBS-TV
- Don Zimmer (1931–2014), New York Yankees bench coach and former Boston Red Sox Manager

== Historic sites ==
Wyckoff is home to the following locations on the National Register of Historic Places:

- Cairns–Whitten–Blauvelt House – 160 Ravine Avenue (added 1983), was constructed c. 1770.
- Cruse–Hossington House – 301 Newtown Road (added 1983), is a Dutch farmhouse that dates back to 1798.
- Folly House – 310 Crescent Avenue (added 1983), is a 1 1/2-story home constructed sometime before 1860.
- Masker House – 470 Wyckoff Avenue (added 1983), was constructed in 1780, with an addition built on to the original structure.
- Reformed Dutch Church of Wyckoff – 580 Wyckoff Avenue (added 2003)
- John C. Stagg House – 308 Sicomac Avenue (added 1983), was built in the second half of the 18th century on a foundation dating to 1747.
- Terhune House – 161 Godwin Avenue (added 1983), dates to the 1700s.
- Van Blarcom–Jardine House – 380 Wyckoff Avenue (added 1983)
- Van Blarcom House (Wyckoff, New Jersey) – 131 Godwin Avenue (added 1983).
- Albert Van Blarcom House – 250 Crescent Avenue (added 1983) dates back to the 1700s, with the main portion of the current house constructed around 1830.
- Van Gelder House – 347 Godwin Avenue (added 1983)
- Van Horn–Ackerman House – 101 Wyckoff Avenue (added 1983), consists of an original structure dating back to 1750, with successively larger additions tacked on to the house over the years.
- Van Houten–Ackerman House (Wyckoff, New Jersey) – 480 Sicomac Avenue (added 1983), known by the name "Wellsweep", the original portion of the home dates back to the 1700s.
- Van Voorhees–Quackenbush House – 421 Franklin Avenue (added 1983). Dating to an original structure built c. 1740, the house is believed to be the oldest in the township and was contributed to the township in 1973 following the death of Grace Quackenbush Zabriskie.
- Van Voorhis-Quackenbush House – 625 Wyckoff Avenue (added 1984)

== Sources ==
- Municipal Incorporations of the State of New Jersey (according to Counties) prepared by the Division of Local Government, Department of the Treasury (New Jersey); December 1, 1958.
- Brown, David R.; and the Wyckoff Historical Society Images of America: Wyckoff, Arcadia Publishing, 2002. ISBN 9780738511412.
- Clayton, W. Woodford; and Nelson, William. History of Bergen and Passaic Counties, New Jersey, with Biographical Sketches of Many of its Pioneers and Prominent Men., Philadelphia: Everts and Peck, 1882.
- Harvey, Cornelius Burnham (ed.), Genealogical History of Hudson and Bergen Counties, New Jersey. New York: New Jersey Genealogical Publishing Co., 1900.
- Van Dusen, Matthew. "Losing the Space Race", The Record, September 14, 2006.
- Van Valen, James M. History of Bergen County, New Jersey. New York: New Jersey Publishing and Engraving Co., 1900.
- Westervelt, Frances A. (Frances Augusta), 1858–1942, History of Bergen County, New Jersey, 1630–1923, Lewis Historical Publishing Company, 1923.
- On High Ground: A History of the Township of Wyckoff, New Jersey, Donning Company Publishers, 2000. ISBN 9781578641215.
